= Warren Street station (MBTA) =

Light rail station in Boston, Massachusetts, US

Warren Street
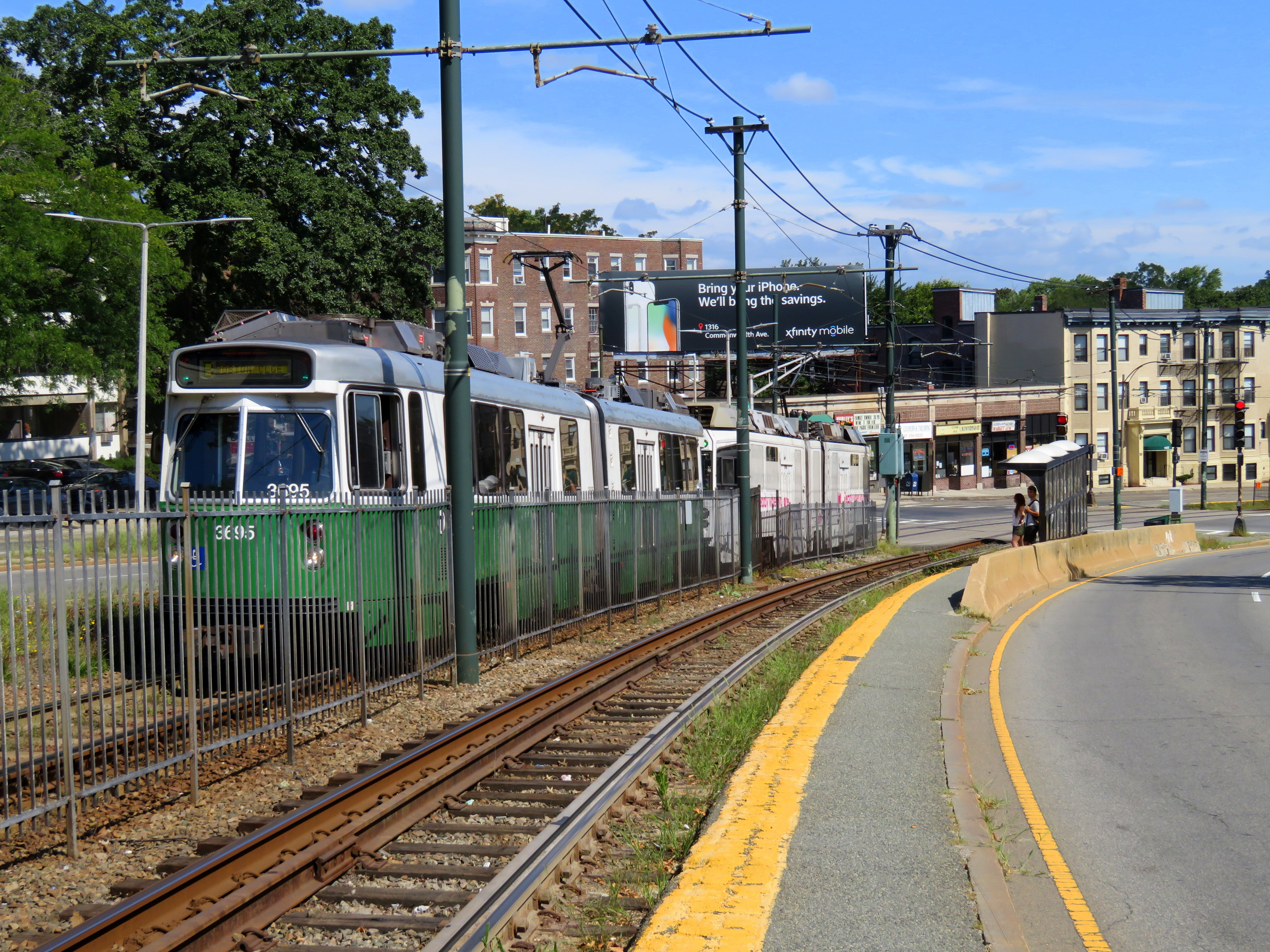
- An outbound train passing the inbound platform in 2018

General information
- Location: Commonwealth Avenue at Warren Street; Brighton, Boston, Massachusetts
- Coordinates: 42.3486°N 71.1403°W
- Platforms: 2 side platforms
- Tracks: 2

Construction
- Accessible: No

History
- Opened: May 26, 1900
- Closed: 2027 or 2028 (planned)
- Rebuilt: 1983

Passengers
- 2011: 2,047 daily boardings

Services
Preceding station	MBTA	Following station
Washington Street toward Boston College	Green Line B branch	Allston Street toward Government Center
Location

Warren Street station is a light rail station on the MBTA Green Line B branch, located on Commonwealth Avenue at Warren Street in Allston, Boston, Massachusetts. The station is not accessible. It has two side platforms, located on the near sides of the Warren Street grade crossing, to serve the line's two tracks. Warren Street is not accessible. The MBTA plans to consolidate the station with nearby Allston Street station in 2027–2028.

== History ==
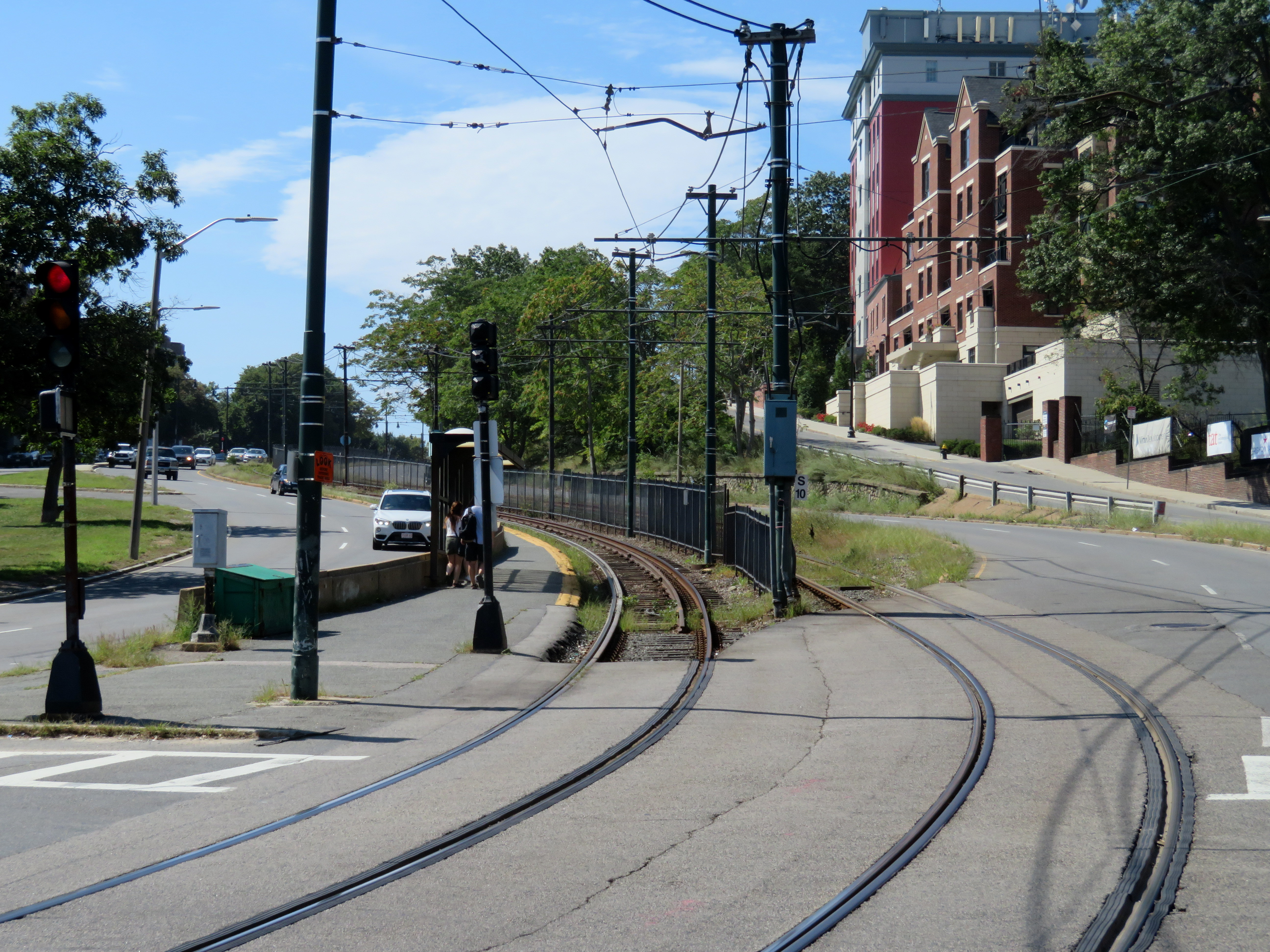
Southbound travel lanes crossing the tracks at Warren Street

Streetcar service began when the section from Packards Corner to Chestnut Hill Avenue opened on May 26, 1900, connecting previously opened trackage to the east and west. The trackage was not in a center median (as were the earlier sections), but in a reservation between the southbound travel lane and southbound carriage lane. Between Warren Street and Wallingford Road to the southwest, the reservation was significantly wider than the tracks. In 1960, new southbound travel lanes were built along that section; southbound traffic now crosses the B branch tracks at Warren Street.

Until 1983, the inbound platform had only a curb to separate passengers from the southbound travel lanes. While the line was shut down for track replacement from July 30 to September 10, 1983, the station was rebuilt with a low wall on the inbound platform to separate passengers from traffic, as well as a small shelter.

Track work in 2018–19, which included replacement of platform edges at several stops (not including Warren Street), triggered requirements for accessibility modifications at those stops. Planning for modifications to five B Branch stops began in 2021. In 2024, Warren Street and the other remaining non-accessible B Branch stops were added to the project. By late 2024, Warren Street and nearby Allston Street were to be consolidated into a single station due to their proximity and the grade south of Warren Street, which is too steep for an accessible platform.

By July 2026, the MBTA expected to issue a $73 million design-build contract in August 2026, with construction lasting from mid-2027 to late 2028. The new platforms for the consolidated station will be located at Allston Street. Bids received were higher than expected. In October 2026, the MBTA indicated the project was being rescoped; the contract would be rebid and awarded in 2027, with construction lasting through 2028.
