= Washington Street station (MBTA) =

Light rail station in Boston, Massachusetts, US

Washington Street
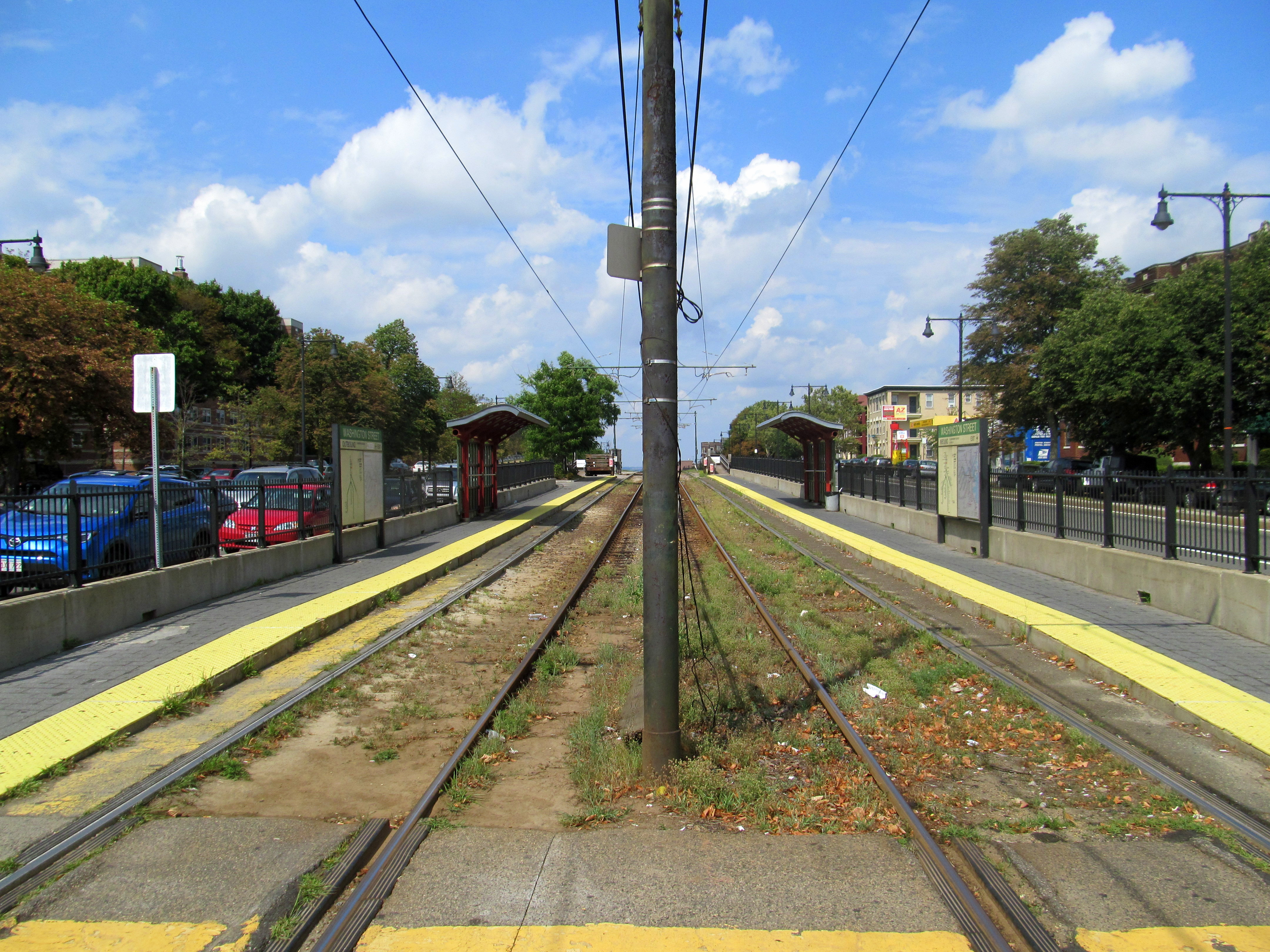
- Facing inbound at Washington Street station in 2016

General information
- Location: Commonwealth Avenue and Washington Street; Brighton, Boston, Massachusetts
- Coordinates: 42.34389°N 71.14259°W
- Platforms: 2 side platforms
- Tracks: 2
- Connections: MBTA bus: 65

Construction
- Accessible: Yes

History
- Opened: May 26, 1900
- Rebuilt: November 2001–March 2002

Passengers
- 2011: 1,885 (weekday average boardings)

Services
Preceding station	MBTA	Following station
Sutherland Road toward Boston College	Green Line B branch	Warren Street toward Government Center
Location

Washington Street station is a surface stop on the Massachusetts Bay Transportation Authority (MBTA)'s Green Line B branch, located in Brighton, Boston. The station is located in the median of Commonwealth Avenue northeast of Washington Street. Washington Street station consists of two side platforms, which serve the B branch's two tracks. The station is fully accessible.

== History ==
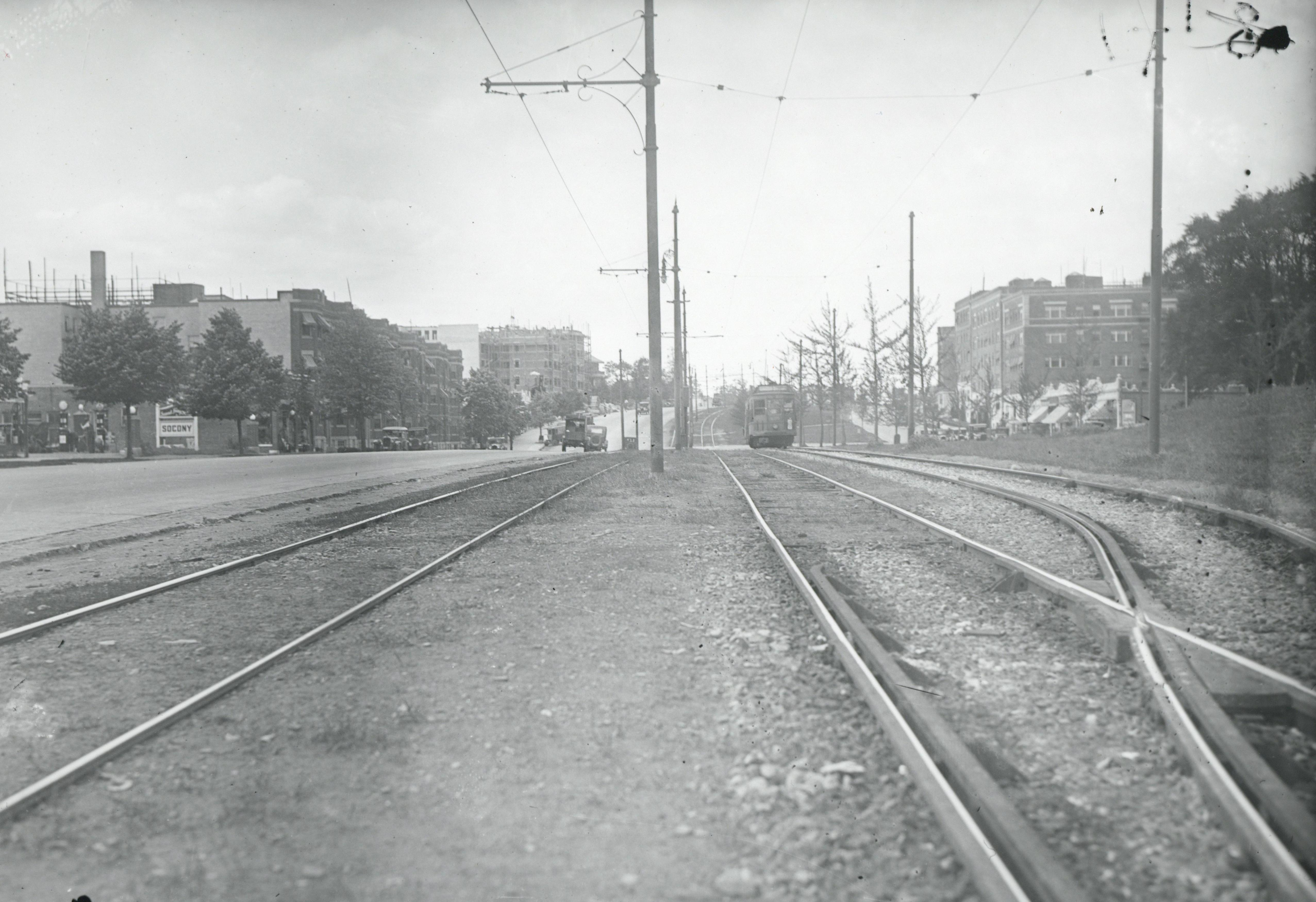
The pocket track at Washington Street around the time of its completion

Streetcar service on Commonwealth Avenue between Brighton Avenue and Chestnut Hill Avenue began on May 26, 1900. From October 27, 1926, to January 23, 1953, a passing siding was in place just east of Washington Street. It was occasionally used to short turn trains.

In the early 2000s, the MBTA modified key surface stops with raised platforms for accessibility. The renovation of Washington Street - part of a $32 million modification of thirteen B, C, and E branch stations - began in November 2001. The renovation was completed in October 2002; delays in construction caused cascading delays to similar renovations at Boston University East and Boston University Central. During construction, temporary platforms south of Washington Street were used.

Around 2006, the MBTA added wooden mini-high platforms on the inbound end of both platforms, allowing level boarding on older Type 7 LRVs. These platforms were installed at eight Green Line stations in 2006–07 as part of the settlement of Joanne Daniels-Finegold, et al. v. MBTA. The mini-high platforms were removed in 2020 during a trackwork project.
