= Allston Street station =

Light rail station in Boston, Massachusetts, US

Allston Street
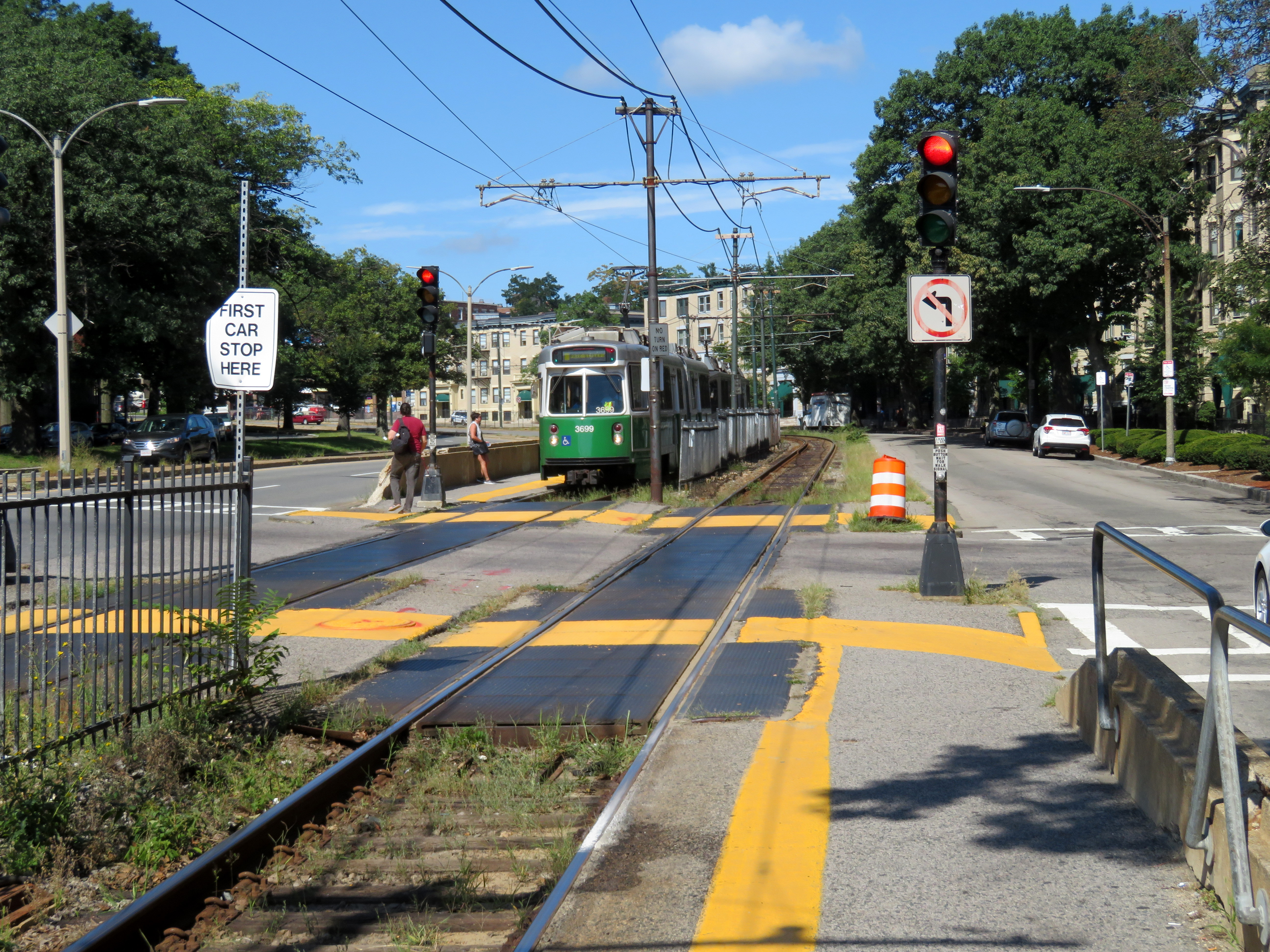
- An inbound train at Allston Street station in 2018

General information
- Location: Commonwealth Avenue at Allston Street; Boston, Massachusetts
- Coordinates: 42.3486°N 71.1376°W
- Platforms: 2 side platforms
- Tracks: 2

Construction
- Accessible: No

History
- Opened: May 26, 1900
- Rebuilt: 1983; 2027–2028 (planned)

Passengers
- 2011: 1,437 daily boardings

Services
Preceding station	MBTA	Following station
Warren Street toward Boston College	Green Line B branch	Griggs Street toward Government Center
Location

Allston Street station is a light rail station on the MBTA Green Line B branch, located between the westbound travel lanes and frontage road of Commonwealth Avenue at Allston Street in Allston, Boston, Massachusetts. The station is not accessible. It has two side platforms, located on the near sides of the Allston Street grade crossing, to serve the line's two tracks.

== History ==
Streetcar service began when the section from Packards Corner to Chestnut Hill Avenue opened on May 26, 1900, connecting previously opened trackage to the east and west. Until 1983, the station had narrow platforms; the inbound platform had only a curb to separate passengers from the southbound travel lanes. While the line was shut down for track replacement from July 30 to September 10, 1983, the station was rebuilt with low walls to separate passengers from traffic.

Track work in 2018–19, which included replacement of platform edges at several stops (not including Allston Street), triggered requirements for accessibility modifications at those stops. Planning for modifications to five B Branch stops began in 2021. In 2024, Allston Street and the other remaining non-accessible B Branch stops were added to the project. The stops at Allston Street and nearby Warren Street are to be consolidated into a single station due to their proximity and a steep grade south of Warren Street.

By July 2026, the MBTA expected to issue a $73 million design-build contract in August 2026, with construction lasting from mid-2027 to late 2028. Bids received were higher than expected. In October 2026, the MBTA indicated the project was being rescoped; the contract would be rebid and awarded in 2027, with construction lasting through 2028.
