= Route 86 (MBTA) =

Bus route in Greater Boston

86
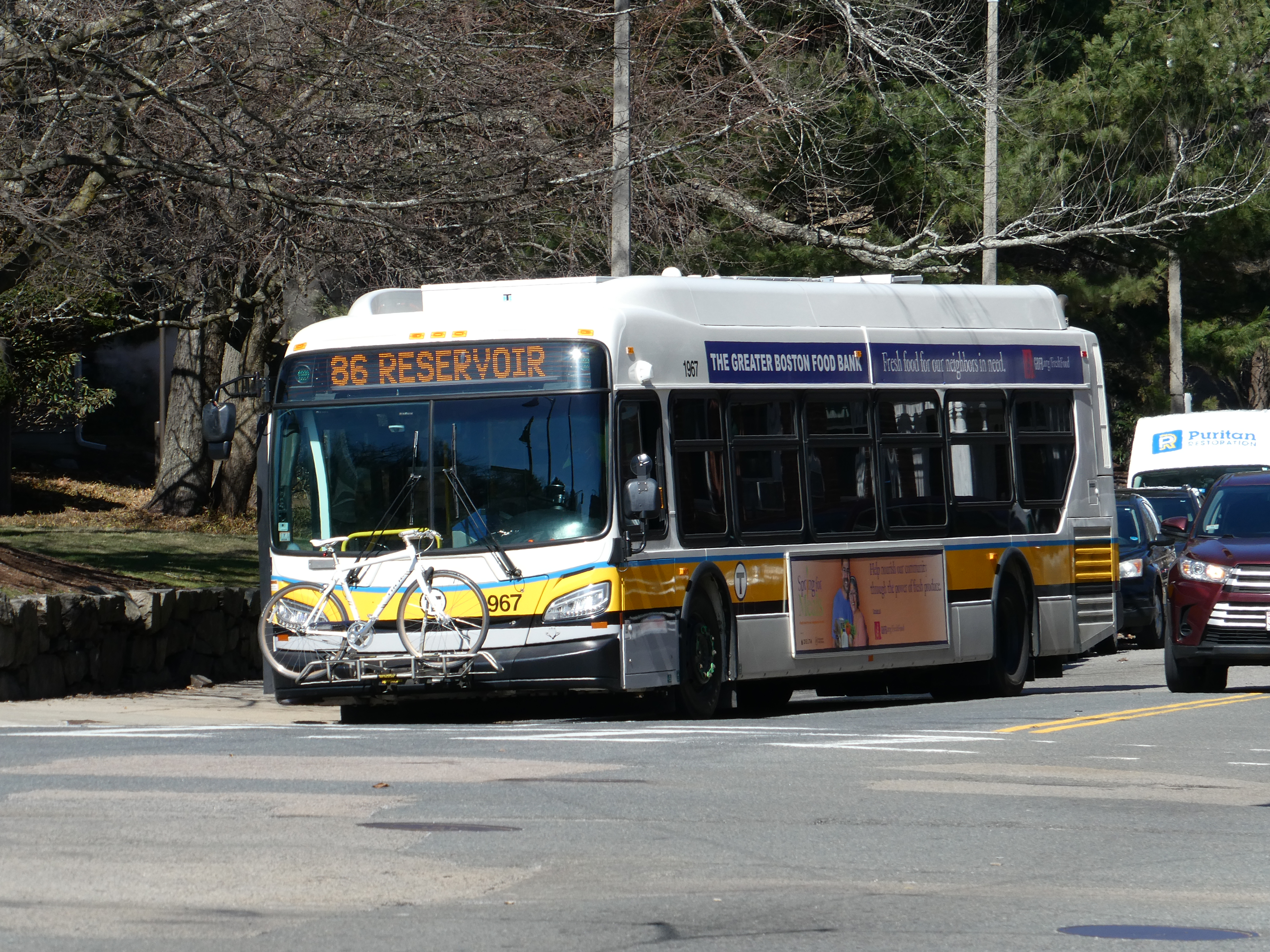
- A route 86 bus on Chestnut Hill Avenue in March 2022

Overview
- System: MBTA bus
- Garage: Somerville Garage

Route
- Locale: Boston and Cambridge, Massachusetts
- Start: Harvard station
- End: Reservoir station (Cleveland Circle)
- Length: 3.95 miles (6.36 km) eastbound 4.10 miles (6.60 km) westbound
- Daily ridership: 6,150 (2018)

Route 86 is a local bus route in Boston and Cambridge operated by the Massachusetts Bay Transportation Authority (MBTA) as part of MBTA bus service. It operates between Reservoir station and Harvard station, via Lower Allston and Brighton Center. In 2018, it had the 18th-highest weekday ridership on the system, though it ranked 37th by number of weekday trips. A 2018–19 MBTA review of its bus system found that route 86 had infrequent and unreliable service, including irregular scheduled headways, despite its high ridership and significance as a crosstown connecting route.

Transit service on portions of the modern route date back to horsecar lines opened in the 19th century, several of which were converted to electric streetcars in the 1890s. Three overlapping bus routes (later designated 63, 86, and 91) were established between 1925 and 1931, replacing circumferential streetcar services and creating new connections. Route 86 ran between Union Square, Allston and Union Square, Somerville until it was extended to Sullivan Square in 1977 and 1981 to supplement route 91. In 1989, the western end was extended to Cleveland Circle, replacing route 63. In December 2024, the eastern half of the route became part of route 109, with route 86 cut to run between Reservoir and Harvard.

== Route ==
Route 86 runs between Harvard station in Cambridge and Reservoir station at Cleveland Circle on the Brookline / Brighton, Boston border. Reservoir-bound buses at Harvard board at the intersection of Massachusetts Avenue and Garden Street at Dawes Island, while Harvard-bound buses terminate in the Harvard Bus Tunnel. South of Harvard Square, the route runs south on John F. Kennedy Street / North Harvard Street to Barry's Corner, west on Western Avenue, and south on Leo M. Birmingham Parkway and Market Street to Brighton Center, then south on Chestnut Hill Avenue to the Reservoir station busway.

Scheduled one-way running times range from about 20 minutes off-peak to 30 minutes at peak, with shorter times during early mornings and late nights. Service operates from about 5:00 am to 12:30 am on weekdays and Saturdays, and from about 6:00 am to 12:30 am on Sundays. As of December 2024, weekday peak headways are 15 minutes or better, with 20-minute midday headways and 25-minute evening and weekend headways. It operates as a crosstown/circumferential route, with MBTA subway connections at Harvard (Red Line), Chestnut Hill Avenue (Green Line B branch), Cleveland Circle (Green Line C branch), and Reservoir (Green Line D branch).

Route 86 runs as a local route with standard local bus fare. In 2018, on the old routing between Reservoir and Sullivan, the route averaged 6,150 boardings on weekdays; average weekend ridership was 3,040 on Saturdays and 1,840 on Sundays. This made it the 18th-highest-ridership route in the MBTA bus system, with more boardings than four of the key bus routes. Despite this, it ranked 37th by number of weekday trips, leading to crowding on many trips.

== History ==
=== Early lines ===
Several portions of the modern iterations of the route originated as horsecar and streetcar lines:

- A short section on Chestnut Hill Avenue between Beacon Street and Commonwealth Avenue opened in 1896 as an extension of the electric Beacon Street line. The last revenue service over those tracks ran in 1926, though it remains in use for non-revenue moves.
- The segment between Harvard Square and Union Square, Brighton, originated as horsecar lines of the Cambridge Railroad. The Western Avenue and Market Street segments opened as part of a line from Central Square, Cambridge in 1880, which was electrified in 1896. The North Harvard Street segment, which opened in 1883, was never electrified and was abandoned in the early 1890s.
- The former segment on Kirkland Street between Harvard Square and Beacon Street (now part of route 109) was opened as a horsecar line of the Charles River Street Railway in 1882; it was never converted to electric operation and was abandoned in the early 1890s.
- The former segment between Sullivan Square and Union Square, Somerville (now part of route 109) was a horsecar line of the Somerville Horse Railroad (later Middlesex Railroad) opened in 1858. Electric service began on October 17, 1895; streetcars initially used Brighton, Perkins, Caldwell, and Broadway to avoid the grade crossing near Sullivan Square. This diversion was eliminated by 1898, though the grade crossing was not replaced with a bridge until 1901.

=== Bus replacements ===
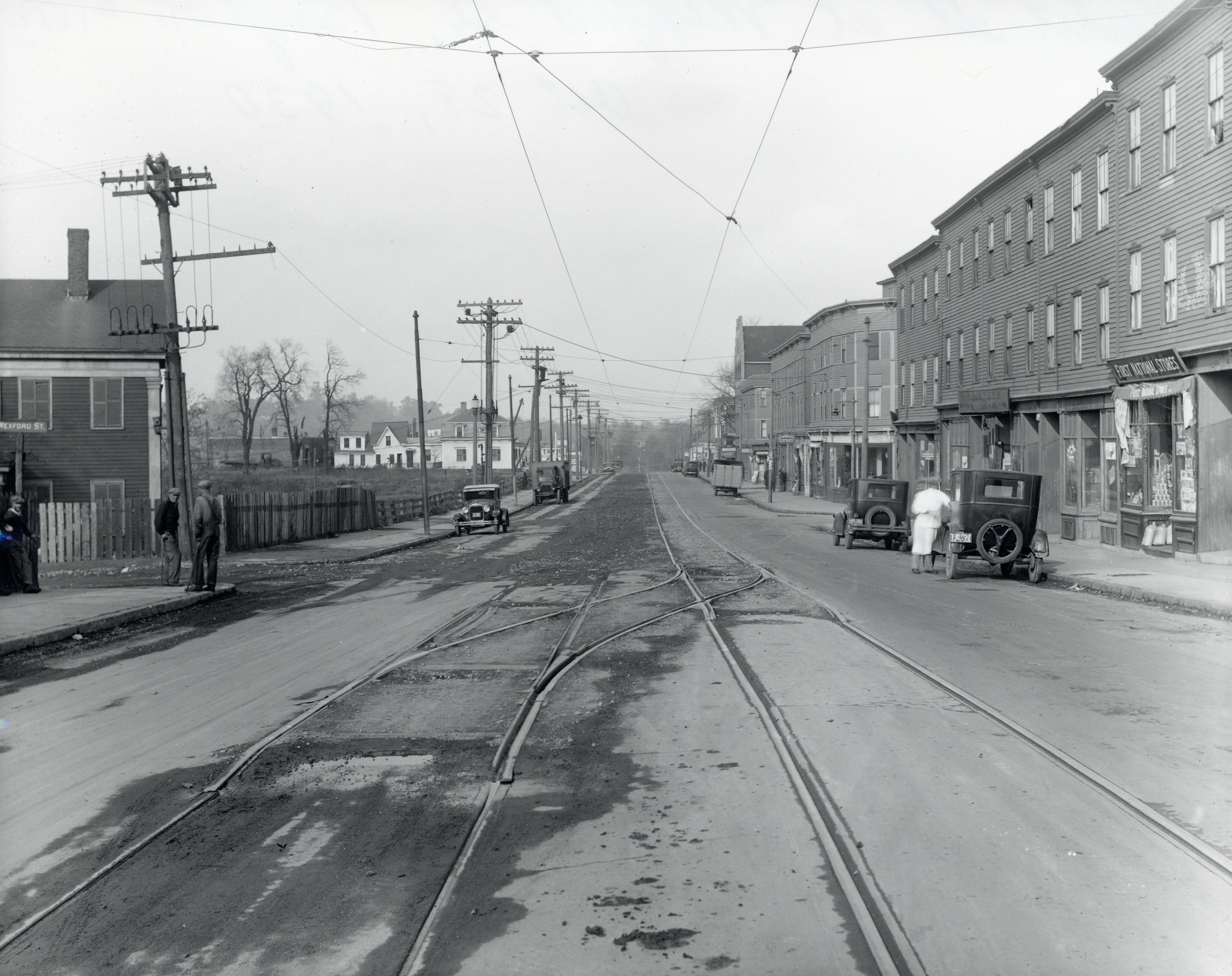
Streetcar tracks on Market Street in Brighton in 1930

Horsecar and streetcar operations in Boston and surrounding municipalities were consolidated under the West End Street Railway in the 1880s; it was leased by the Boston Elevated Railway (BERy) in 1897. The BERy began operating bus service in 1922. A Harvard Square–Union Square, Somerville bus route began operation on August 22, 1925. It was extended from Harvard Square to Union Square, Allston on December 19.

By 1930, the Union Square–Sullivan Square segment was operated as part of a Central Square–Sullivan Square streetcar line. On February 1, the Central Square–Union Square segment was replaced by a bus route, leaving a Union Square–Sullivan Square streetcar shuttle. On November 15, that shuttle was replaced with a new bus route at the city's request, with the intention of reducing congestion in Union Square. The two bus routes were connected into a single route on February 14, 1931, again forming a Central Square–Sullivan Square route. The Sullivan–Union tracks remained in use for non-revenue equipment moves until 1951.

On June 8, 1931, the Brighton Center–Central Square streetcar line was replaced with buses and extended south to Commonwealth Avenue. Initially, only half of service operated south of Brighton Center. (The Western Avenue tracks would remain in use until 1950 for Watertown service, which is now bus route 70.)

=== Later history ===
In 1940–41, the BERy reassigned its public-facing route numbers. The Commonwealth Avenue–Central Square route was designated route 63, Union Square–Union Square as route 86, and Central Square–Sullivan Square as route 91. The Western Avenue segment of route 63 was eliminated in February 1943 as a wartime measure, but it was extended slightly from Commonwealth Avenue to Cleveland Circle. The Western Avenue segment was resumed in 1946, forming a Cleveland Circle–Central Square route.

The BERy was replaced in 1947 by the Metropolitan Transit Authority (MTA). Sunday service on route 63 ended in 1958. On July 4, 1959, the southern terminal was extended slightly from Cleveland Circle to a new busway at Reservoir station as the Riverside Line opened, though the terminus was still listed as "Cleveland Circle" in public schedules. In September 1962, the MTA through-routed several routes as part of experimental attempts to increase ridership. Route 63 was interlined with route 83 to form a Cleveland Circle–Porter Square route, while route 91 was interlined with route 93 to form a Central Square–Haymarket route. Neither was successful; they returned to their previous terminals in March 1964 and June 1963, respectively.

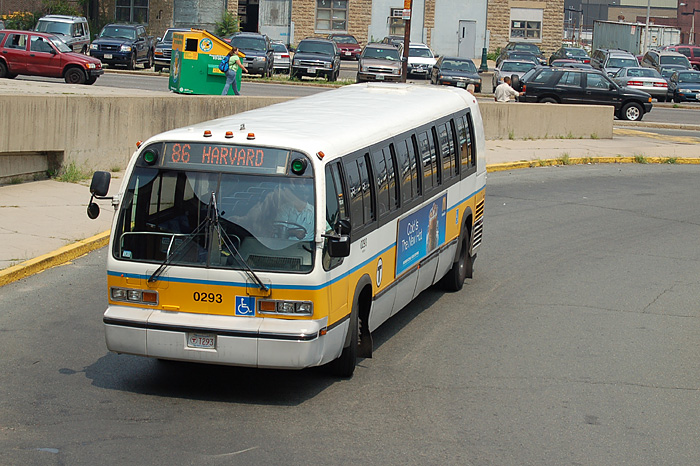
A route 86 bus at Sullivan Square in 2006

The MTA was in turn replaced by the Massachusetts Bay Transportation Authority (MBTA) in 1964. Sunday service on a Union Square, Somerville–Cleveland Circle route – a combination of routes 63, 64, and 86 – began in June 1973. In September 1977, peak hour route 86 service was extended to Sullivan Square, supplementing route 91. The Sunday route was discontinued in April 1981, but off-peak and Saturday route 86 service was extended to Sullivan Square. At the same time, weekday evening and Saturday morning service on routes 63 and 64 was combined into a loop that followed route 64 westbound and route 63 eastbound. This loop route began running on Sundays in January 1983. From 1979 to the early 1980s, route 86 was detoured over Somerville Avenue and Dane Street west while the Washington Street bridge over the Fitchburg Line was rebuilt.

In December 1989, route 63 was discontinued, with route 86 realigned over much of the former route to form a Cleveland Circle–Sullivan Square circumferential line. Route 66 was extended from Union Square to Harvard Square to replace the realigned segment of route 86 (supplementing it between Barry's Corner and Harvard Square), while route 70 continued serving the discontinued east portion of route 63. Sunday service on route 86 began at this time. Elderly patrons who lost their one-seat ride from Brighton to Central Square petitioned for route 63 to return. As a result, midday Cleveland Circle–Central Square service, operating as a variation of route 64, operated from December 1990 to December 1993.

Peak-hour short turn trips of route 86 were added in the 1990s. Limited-stop crosstown route CT2 was extended to Sullivan Square in September 2000, supplementing routes 86 and 91 on the Union Square–Sullivan Square segment. In September 2008, eastbound buses were rerouted through the Harvard Bus Tunnel, rather than passing through Harvard Square on the surface. Most peak-hour short turn trips were discontinued in September 2011. From April 2019 to May 2020, route 86 was detoured via Cross Street while the Lowell Line overhead bridge was rebuilt as part of the Green Line Extension project. A 2018–19 MBTA review of its bus system found that route 86 had infrequent and unreliable service, including irregular scheduled headways, despite its high ridership and significance as a crosstown connecting route. No short-term changes to the routing were recommended.

By 2022, scheduled headways were more consistent than during the 2018–19 review. In May 2022, the MBTA released a draft plan for a systemwide network redesign. The draft called for the 86 to be cut to a Harvard–Reservoir route; the Harvard–Sullivan Square segment would become an extension of route 109 with higher frequency. A revised proposal in November 2022 kept these changes. The change occurred on December 15, 2024. Frequency was increased on the shortened 86 and the extended 109.
