= Cleveland Circle =

Area of Boston, Massachusetts, US

Coordinates: 42.3359°N 71.1507°W

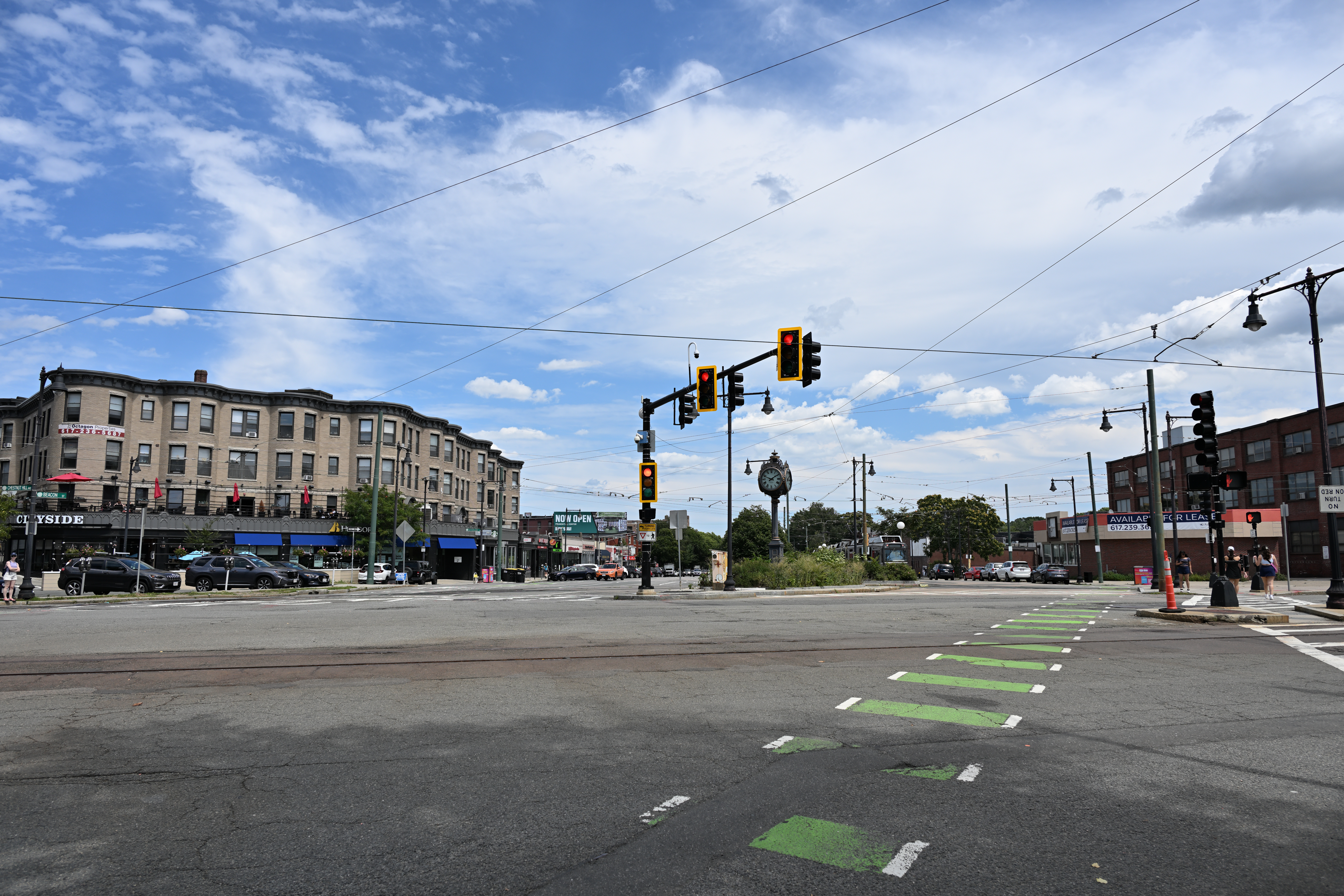
A view of Cleveland Circle at the intersection of Beacon Street and Chestnut Hill Avenue, looking east down Beacon Street (August 2024)

Cleveland Circle is an area of Boston, Massachusetts. It is located at the southern tip of Boston's Brighton neighborhood, and more specifically the Aberdeen section of Brighton, near the town of Brookline and village of Chestnut Hill, at the intersection of Beacon Street and Chestnut Hill Avenue.

== Description ==
Cleveland Circle is the commercial "town center" of the Aberdeen section of Brighton, a residential area of apartment buildings and free-standing homes, populated primarily by working professionals of all ages, as well as seniors. The area also has student rentals inhabited primarily by students from nearby Boston College; but, nevertheless, student renters are the smallest segment of the area's population.

This part of Brighton is a historical streetcar suburb, now serviced by the Green Line of the Massachusetts Bay Transportation Authority (MBTA). Cleveland Circle station is the terminus of the Green Line C branch, Reservoir station on the Green Line D branch is one block to the south, and Chestnut Hill Avenue station on the Green Line B branch is a short walk away.

== History ==
Chestnut Hill Avenue was laid out in 1845, and Beacon Street in 1850.

Reservoir opened as a commuter rail station on the Charles River Branch Railroad (by then merged into the Charles River Railroad) in November 1852. In 1883, the Boston and Albany Railroad bought the line between Brookline Junction and Cook Junction and extended it to Reservoir as its Highland branch, running Newton Circuit service beginning in 1886. The addition of the West End Street Railway on Beacon Street in 1887 caused a construction boom in Brookline and Cleveland Circle, by making it easy for residents to commute into work in downtown Boston. The line was electrified in 1889 and in 1896 extended to Boston College (Lake Street) via Chestnut Hill Avenue and Commonwealth Avenue. Around 1932 it was cut back to Cleveland Circle.

The Commonwealth Avenue Street Railway also opened in 1896, extending rail service from Boston College to Norumbega Park (on the Charles River near present-day Route 128). This outer streetcar line was converted to bus service in 1930.

In 1900, the West End Street Railway, renamed the Boston Elevated Railway, laid tracks along Commonwealth Avenue from Chestnut Hill Avenue to its existing tracks at Packard's Corner. The new Commonwealth Avenue line, which was electrified in 1909, prompted another local building boom along its length until around 1930. The BERy line is the predecessor of the present-day Green Line B branch.

The Highland branch was closed in 1958 and reopened as a light rail line, connecting to the Boylston Street subway at Kenmore, a year later. In 1967 the Beacon Street line was designated the Green Line C branch, and the Highland branch as the D branch.

Construction on the Chestnut Hill Reservoir, which consolidated the city's four smaller reservoirs, began at the end of the Civil War in 1865 and was completed in 1870. Englewood Avenue and Sutherland Road were laid out in 1872, but the Panic of 1873 delayed development of the new streets.
