= Sutherland Road station =

Light rail station in Boston, Massachusetts, US

Sutherland Road
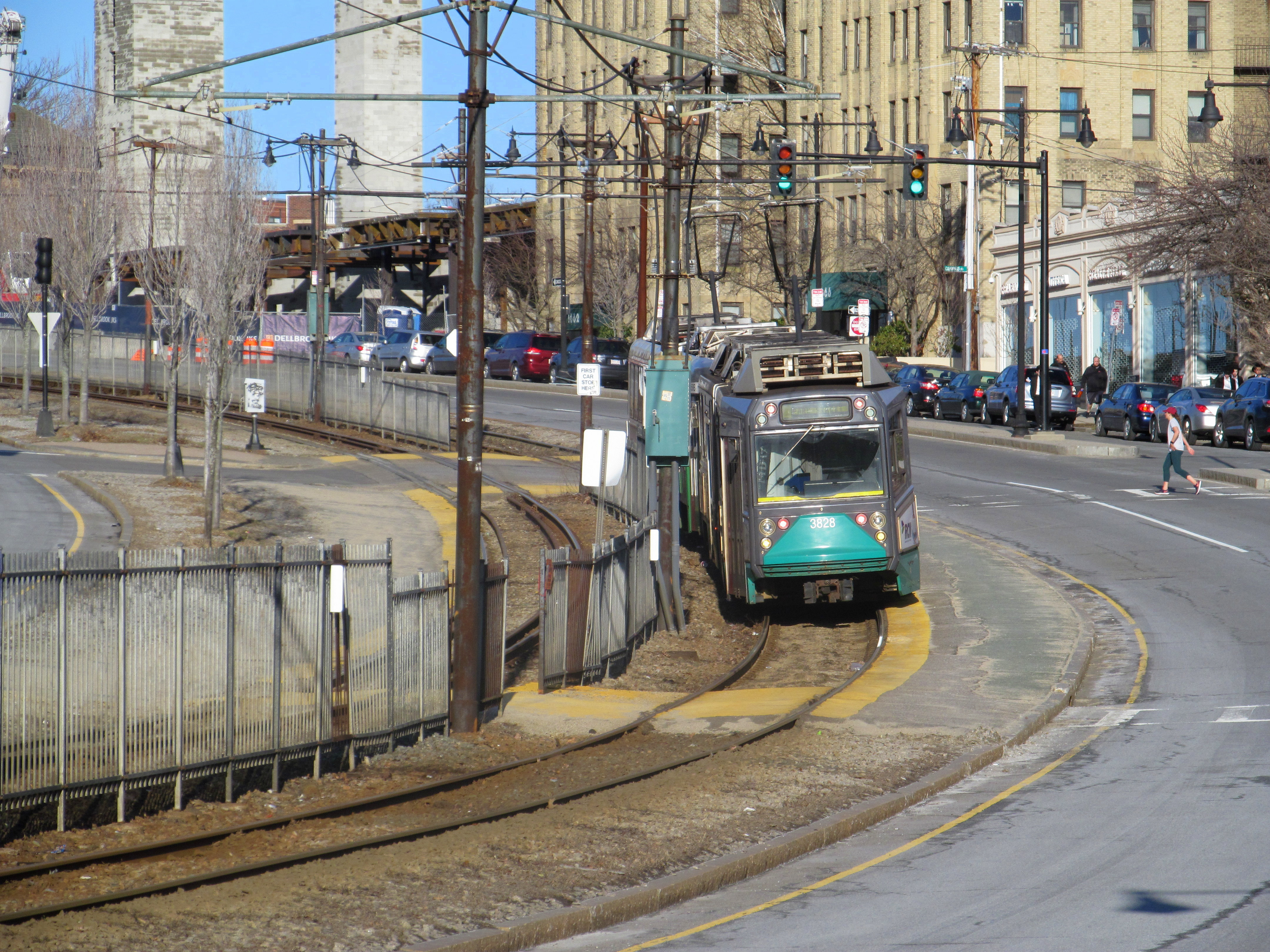
- An inbound train at Sutherland Road station in April 2017

General information
- Location: Commonwealth Avenue at Sutherland Road; Brighton, Boston, Massachusetts
- Coordinates: 42.34158°N 71.14635°W
- Platforms: 2 side platforms
- Tracks: 2

Construction
- Accessible: No

History
- Opened: May 26, 1900
- Rebuilt: 2027–2028 (planned)

Passengers
- 2011: 856 daily boardings

Services
| Preceding station | MBTA | Following station |
|---|---|---|
| Chiswick Road toward Boston College | Green Line B branch | Washington Street toward Government Center |
Location

Sutherland Road station is a light rail stop on the MBTA Green Line B branch, located in the median of Commonwealth Avenue at its intersection with Sutherland Road, in Brighton, Boston, Massachusetts. The stop consists of two side platforms, which serve the B branch's two tracks. The platforms are at track level and the stop is not accessible.

== Reconstruction ==
Track work in 2018–19, which included replacement of platform edges at several stops, triggered requirements for accessibility modifications at those stops. Design for Sutherland Road and four other B Branch stops was 30% complete by December 2022. A design shown in March 2024 called for the platforms to be rebuilt at their current locations. In May 2024, the Federal Transit Administration awarded the MBTA $67 million to construct accessible platforms at 14 B and C branch stops including Sutherland Road. Additional stops were added to the B branch project in 2024.

By July 2026, the MBTA expected to issue a $73 million design-build contract in August 2026, with construction lasting from mid-2027 to late 2028. Bids received were higher than expected. In October 2026, the MBTA indicated the project was being rescoped; the contract would be rebid and awarded in 2027, with construction lasting through 2028.
