= South Street station (MBTA) =

Light rail station in Boston, Massachusetts, US

South Street
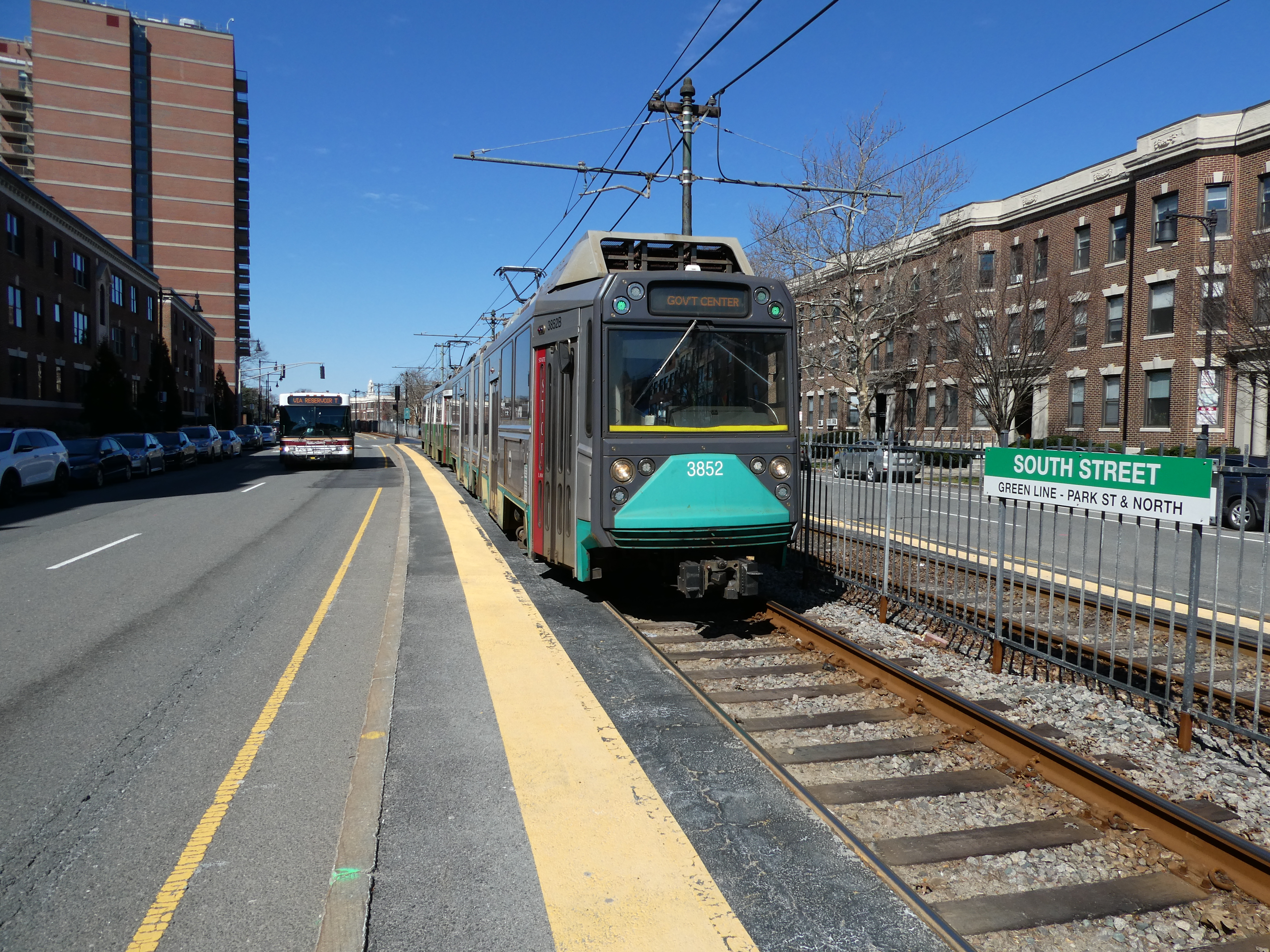
- An inbound train at South Street station in March 2022

General information
- Location: Commonwealth Avenue at South Street; Brighton, Boston, Massachusetts
- Coordinates: 42.33949°N 71.15731°W
- Platforms: 2 side platforms
- Tracks: 2

Construction
- Accessible: No

History
- Closed: 2027 or 2028 (planned)

Passengers
- 2011: 214 (weekday average boardings)

Services
Preceding station	MBTA	Following station
Boston College Terminus	Green Line B branch	Chestnut Hill Avenue toward Government Center
Location

South Street station is a light rail surface stop on the MBTA Green Line B branch, located in the median of Commonwealth Avenue east of South Street in the Brighton neighborhood of Boston, Massachusetts. South Street is the lowest-ridership stop on the B branch, with just 214 daily boardings by a 2011 survey.

== Consolidation ==
Track work in 2018–19, which included replacement of platform edges at several stops, triggered requirements for accessibility modifications at those stops. Design for South Street and four other B Branch stops was 30% complete by December 2022. A design shown in March 2024 called for Chestnut Hill Avenue station and South Street station to be consolidated, with a single station located between Chestnut Hill Driveway and Chestnut Hill Avenue. In May 2024, the Federal Transit Administration awarded the MBTA $67 million to construct accessible platforms at 14 B and C branch stops including the consolidated station.

Additional stops were added to the B branch project in 2024. By July 2026, the MBTA expected to issue a $73 million design-build contract in August 2026, with construction lasting from mid-2027 to late 2028. Bids received were higher than expected. In October 2026, the MBTA indicated the project was being rescoped; the contract would be rebid and awarded in 2027, with construction lasting through 2028.
