= Green Line B branch =

Light rail line in Boston, Massachusetts

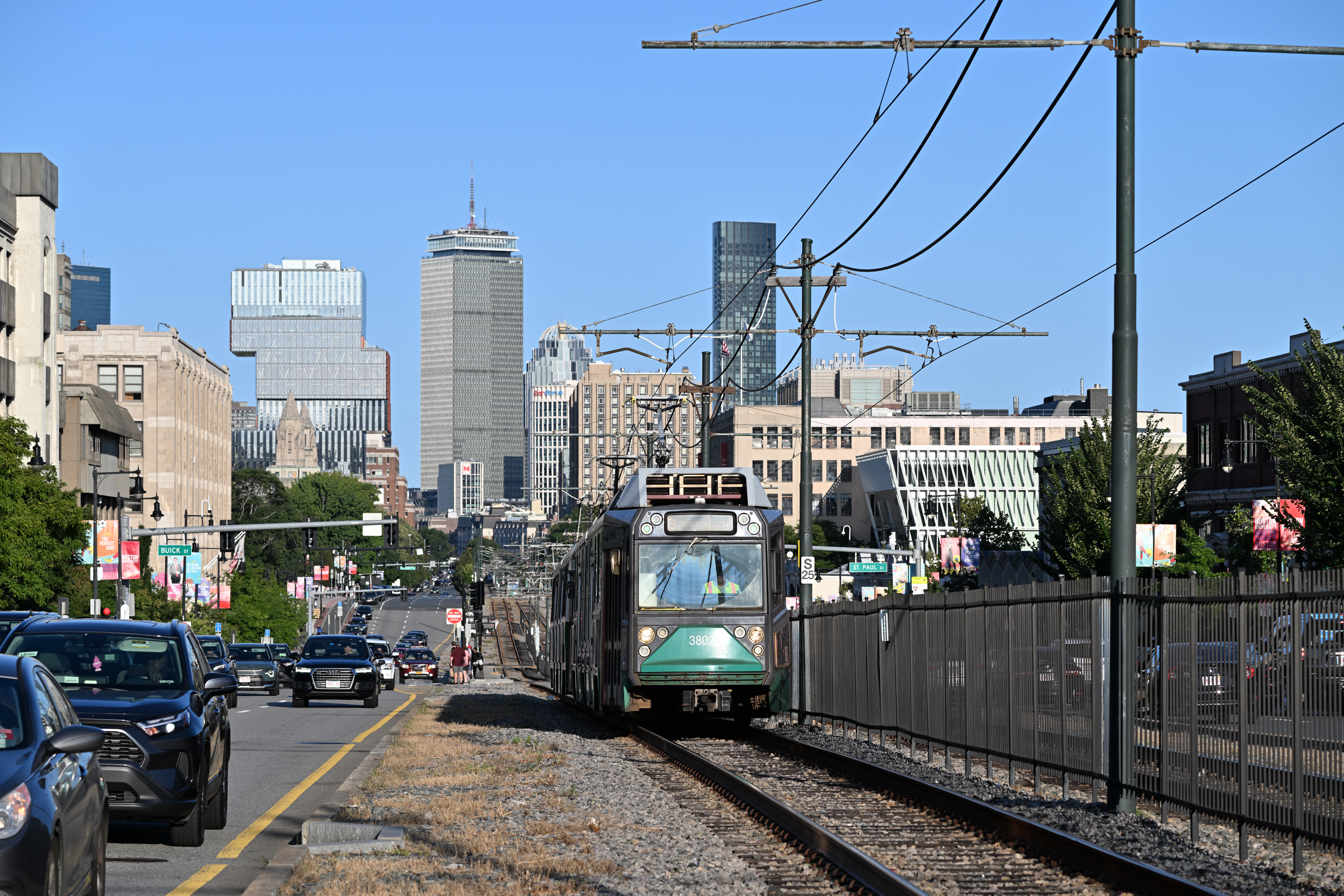
- An outbound train between Amory Street and Babcock Street in 2024

Overview
- Locale: Boston, Massachusetts, United States
- Termini: Government Center; Boston College
- Stations: 23

Service
- Type: Light rail
- System: Green Line
- Daily ridership: 26,310 (weekday average boardings from surface stops only in 2010–2011)

History
- Opened: 1896 (Kenmore–Packards Corner, Lake Street–Chestnut Hill Avenue); 1900 (Packards Corner–Chestnut Hill Avenue)

Technical
- Num of tracks: 2
- Character: Underground (Kenmore and eastward); Center median running (west of Kenmore)
- Track gauge: 4 ft 8 1/2 in (1,435 mm) standard gauge
- Electrification: Overhead line, 600 V DC

The B branch, also called the Commonwealth Avenue branch or Boston College branch, is a branch of the MBTA Green Line light rail system which operates on Commonwealth Avenue west of downtown Boston, Massachusetts. One of four branches of the Green Line, the B branch runs from Boston College station down the median of Commonwealth Avenue to Blandford Street. There, it enters Blandford Street portal into Kenmore station, where it merges with the C and D branches. The combined services run into the Boylston Street subway and Tremont Street subway to downtown Boston. B branch service has terminated at Government Center since October 2021. Unlike the other branches, B branch service runs solely through the city limits of Boston. The Green Line Rivalry between Boston College and Boston University is named in reference to the B branch, which runs to both universities.

As of February 2023, service operates on 8-minute headways at weekday peak hours and 8- to 12-minute headways at other times, using 9 to 15 trains (18 to 30 light rail vehicles).

== History ==
=== Initial construction ===
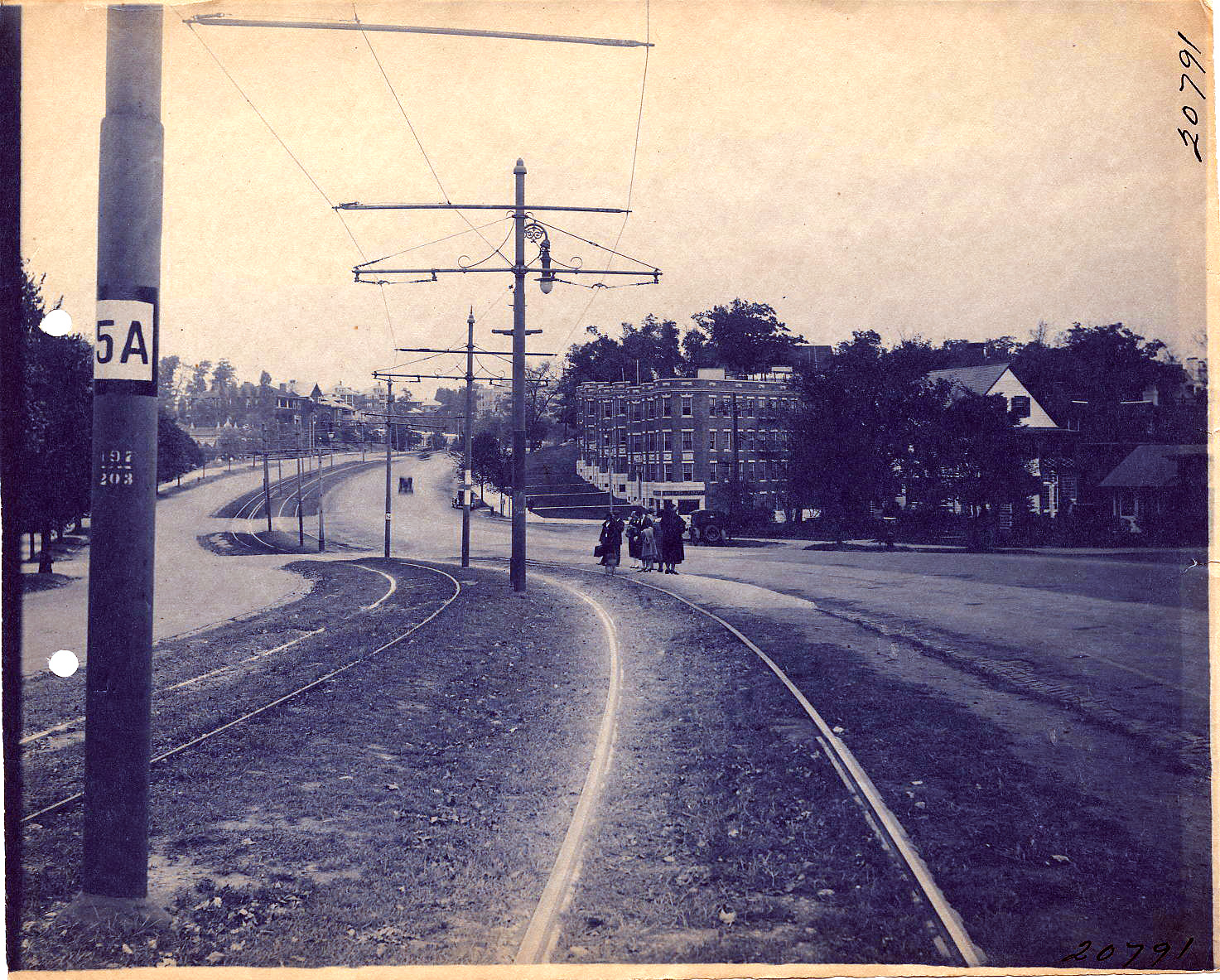
Passengers waiting near Chestnut Hill Avenue around 1910

The first sections of what is now the B branch to open were built for what became the Watertown Line and Beacon Street Line. In 1889, the West End Street Railway opened the Beacon Street Line, including a branch that ran from Coolidge Corner to Oak Square along Harvard Avenue, Brighton Avenue, Cambridge Street, and Washington Street. While this route provided service to the fast-growing suburbs of Allston and Brighton, a more direct route was desirable. When Commonwealth Avenue was improved between Governors Square and the junction with Brighton Avenue in the mid-1890s, a 33-foot (10 m)-wide median was included for use by a streetcar line to support real estate development. Service began from Governors Square to Brighton Avenue, and along Brighton Avenue to connect with the older trackage at Union Square, on May 18, 1896. (That line was extended to near Nonantum Square on June 13, 1896.)

Further west, between Chestnut Hill Avenue and the Boston–Newton boundary at Lake Street, a 25-foot (7.6 m)-wide streetcar median was built. Service between Lake Street and downtown Boston began on August 15, 1896. Streetcars ran on Chestnut Hill Avenue, the existing Beacon Street line, Washington Street, and Huntington Avenue. At Lake Street, the line connected with the Commonwealth Avenue Street Railway, which had opened to Auburndale on March 26, 1896.

East of Governors Square, the Beacon Street line originally ran on Beacon Street, Massachusetts Avenue, and Boylston Street to Park Square. By the time the Commonwealth Avenue segments opened, streetcars continued along heavily congested tracks on Tremont Street (electrified in 1891) to reach the northern railroad terminals. Both the Nonantum Square and Lake Street lines were rerouted into the Tremont Street subway to terminate at Park Street station soon after the tunnel's September 1, 1897 opening.

The Boston Elevated Railway (BERy) leased the West End Street Railway on October 1, 1897, and continued its system expansion. The BERy opened new tracks on Commonwealth Avenue from Chestnut Hill Avenue to Brighton Avenue on May 26, 1900, allowing direct service from Lake Street to downtown via Commonwealth Avenue. Even though much of the land surrounding Commonwealth Avenue in Brighton was not yet developed, the new line was heavily patronized. For most of its length, the 1900-built trackage was not in a center median, but in a reservation between the southbound travel lane and southbound carriage lane. Between Warren Street and Wallingford Road, the reservation was significantly wider than the tracks.

=== Growing service ===
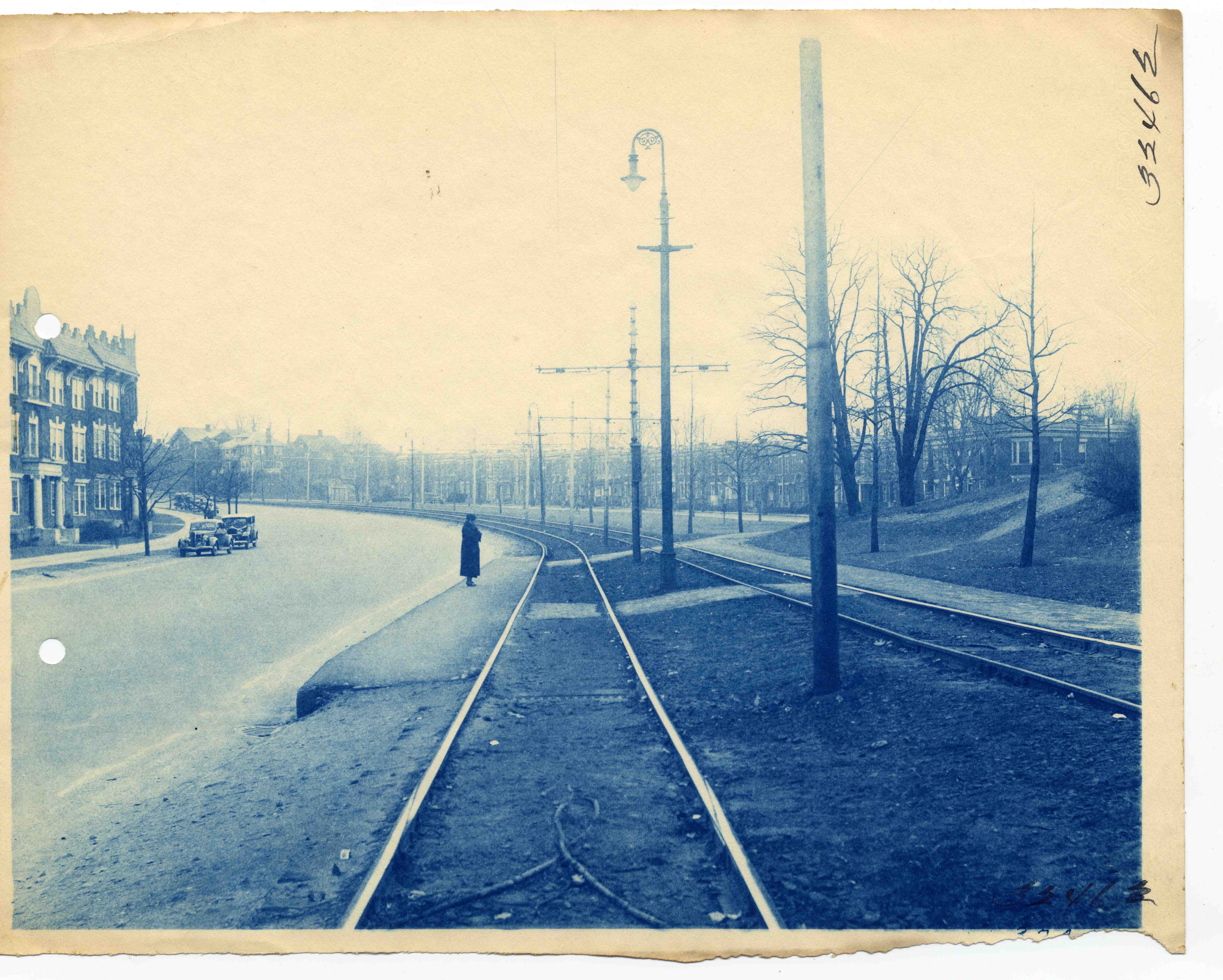
A passenger waiting at Leamington Road, circa 1915–1930

The Commonwealth Avenue Street Railway opened the popular Norumbega Park on June 17, 1897. (That line merged into the Newton and Boston Street Railway (N&B) in 1904 and the Middlesex and Boston Street Railway (M&B) in 1909.) Through service between Norumbega Park and Park Street station, operated by BERy east of Lake Street, begun on January 17, 1903. The Newton Street Railway (also merged into the N&B in 1904) began through service between Park Street and Waltham via the Watertown Line on February 23, 1903. When the Cambridge Tunnel opened in April 1912, the Waltham service was rerouted to Central Square station in Cambridge instead. On May 1, 1912, the M&B began a second through service over the Commonwealth Avenue route – this one running to Newton Highlands. The next month, two men were charged with a planned "conspiracy to blow up the tracks of the Elevated Company in Commonwealth av" using ten sticks of stolen dynamite.

The Boylston Street subway opened on October 3, 1914, acting as an extension of the Tremont Street subway to just east of Governors Square, with intermediate stops at Copley Square and Massachusetts Avenue. (A third station, Arlington, was not built until 1921.) Lake Street service via Washington Street was cut back to Washington Square except at rush hours. The Newton Highlands through service was cut back to Lake Street, where it connected with BERy streetcar service. Norumbega Park through service continued to use the surface route, as the older M&B streetcars could not match the speed of the newer BERy streetcars in the subway. It took was split at Lake Street on November 1, with a connecting BERy line using the surface route; that was cut to a Kenmore–Park Street route on November 21.

On November 21, rush hour Washington Street service was cut back to Reservoir, leaving only Beacon Street cars using the Chestnut Hill Avenue tracks. Beacon Street service was cut to Reservoir on November 6, 1915, with Washington Street service extended back to Lake Street. Beginning on February 6, 1922, all Washington Street service was operated as a Brookline Village–Lake Street shuttle as part of service changes on the Huntington Avenue line. The Washington Street shuttle was converted to bus on April 24, 1926. It was redirected to Brighton Center on June 23, 1928, and eventually became route 65.

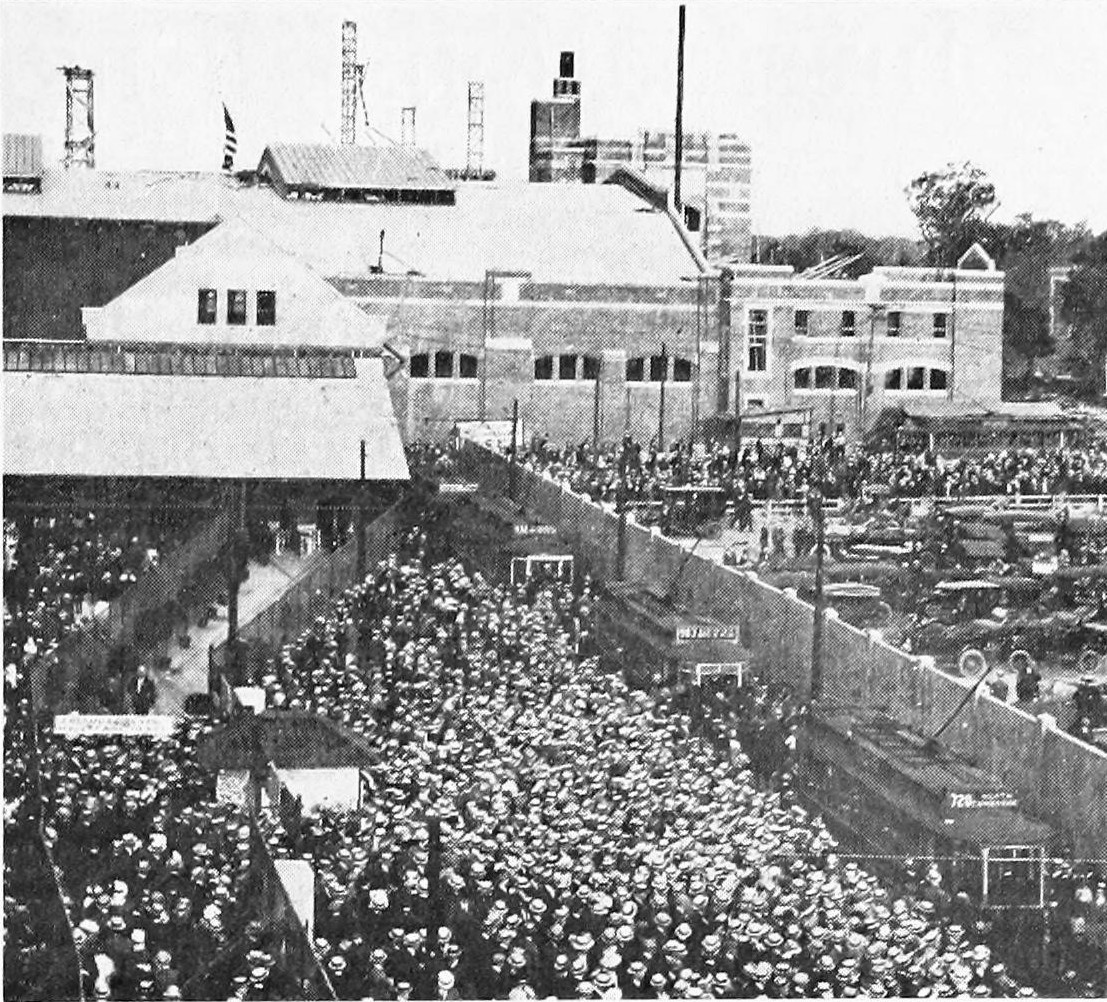
Streetcars at Braves Field on the first game there in 1915

The Commonwealth Avenue line served two major baseball stadiums: Fenway Park (opened 1912) near Governors Square, and Braves Field (opened 1915) in Allston. The BERy opened a prepayment surface station (where riders paid their fares at the stop, rather than on board the streetcar) at Kenmore Street in Governors Square in 1915. The new Braves Field opened on August 18, 1915; it included a loop track between Gaffney Street and Babcock Street with a prepayment station to allow streetcars to directly serve the ballpark. The loop was also used to turn trains for Red Sox games at Fenway Park, and for rush-hour short turns; after November 1945, these short turns also operated during midday and on Saturdays. The loop was heavily used during games; for the 1948 World Series, streetcars ran between Park Street and Braves Field on 45-second headways.

=== Further changes ===
Around 1916, the BERy built a storage yard for streetcars north of Commonwealth Avenue at Lake Street. Remaining M&B service to Lake Street was replaced by buses in 1930; the BERy replaced the old transfer station in the median with a new platform and waiting room in the yard on September 12, 1930. An expansion of Reservoir Yard (south of Beacon Street near Chestnut Hill Avenue), completed in May 1940, supplemented Lake Street Yard and eliminated the need to base some Commonwealth Avenue streetcars at Bennett Street Carhouse in Cambridge.

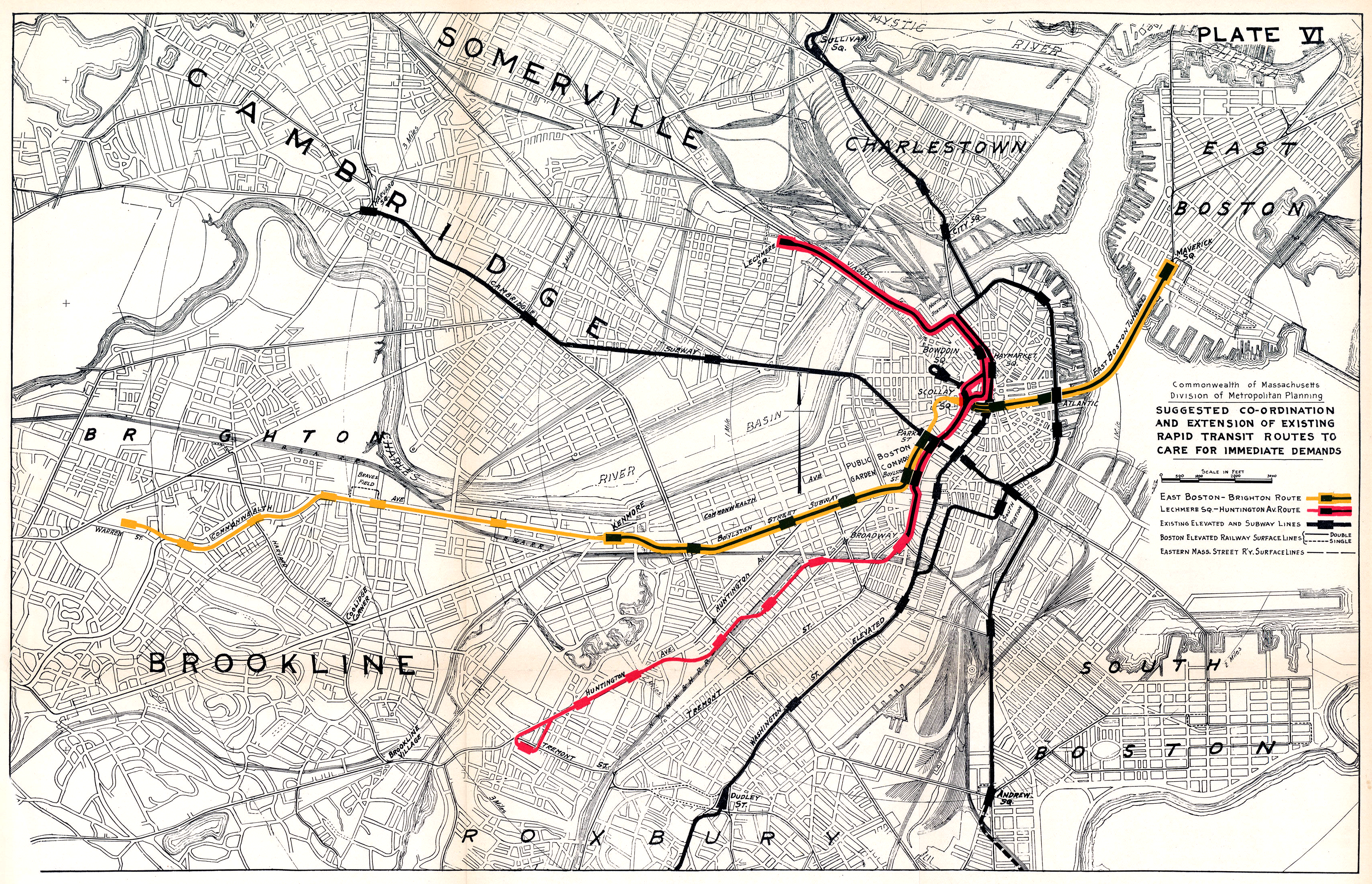
Map of the 1926 proposal

In June 1922, the BERy proposed to operate the inner part of the Commonwealth Avenue line as a rapid transit service. Three-car trains of recently acquired center-entrance cars, which had higher capacity and shorter dwell times than older streetcars, would run on headways as low as two minutes at rush hour and four minutes at other times. A terminal stations would be built at Linden Street (near Harvard Avenue) in Allston, where passengers would transfer between the subway trains and surface streetcar lines. The Lechmere Square in East Cambridge (already under construction) opened that July, but local opposition to the forced transfer caused the Linden Street terminal plan to be scrapped.

The congestion at busy Governors Square caused numerous delays to the streetcar lines. In May 1924, the 143rd Massachusetts General Court directed the Metropolitan District Commission to plan an expanded rapid transit system in Boston, including an extension of the Boylston Street Subway under Governors Square. The report, released in December 1926, called for the existing streetcar tunnels in Boston to be reorganized into two rapid transit lines with high-floor rolling stock. One line was to run from East Boston to Brighton, with the East Boston Tunnel (which had been converted from streetcars to rapid transit in 1924) realigned to connect with the Tremont Street subway near Park Street station. The Boylston Street subway would have been extended to Commonwealth Avenue, with a new station under Governors Square. A transfer station between the rapid transit line and the truncated Watertown and Lake Street surface lines was to be located at Warren Street between Commonwealth Avenue and Cambridge Street, near Brighton Center. Intermediate surface stops were to be located at Saint Mary's Street, Gaffney Street, Packards Corner, Harvard Avenue, and Allston Street. Several busy grade crossings also were to be eliminated, and the report noted that the then-rapid growth along Commonwealth Avenue in Brighton might later justify extension of rapid transit to Lake Street.

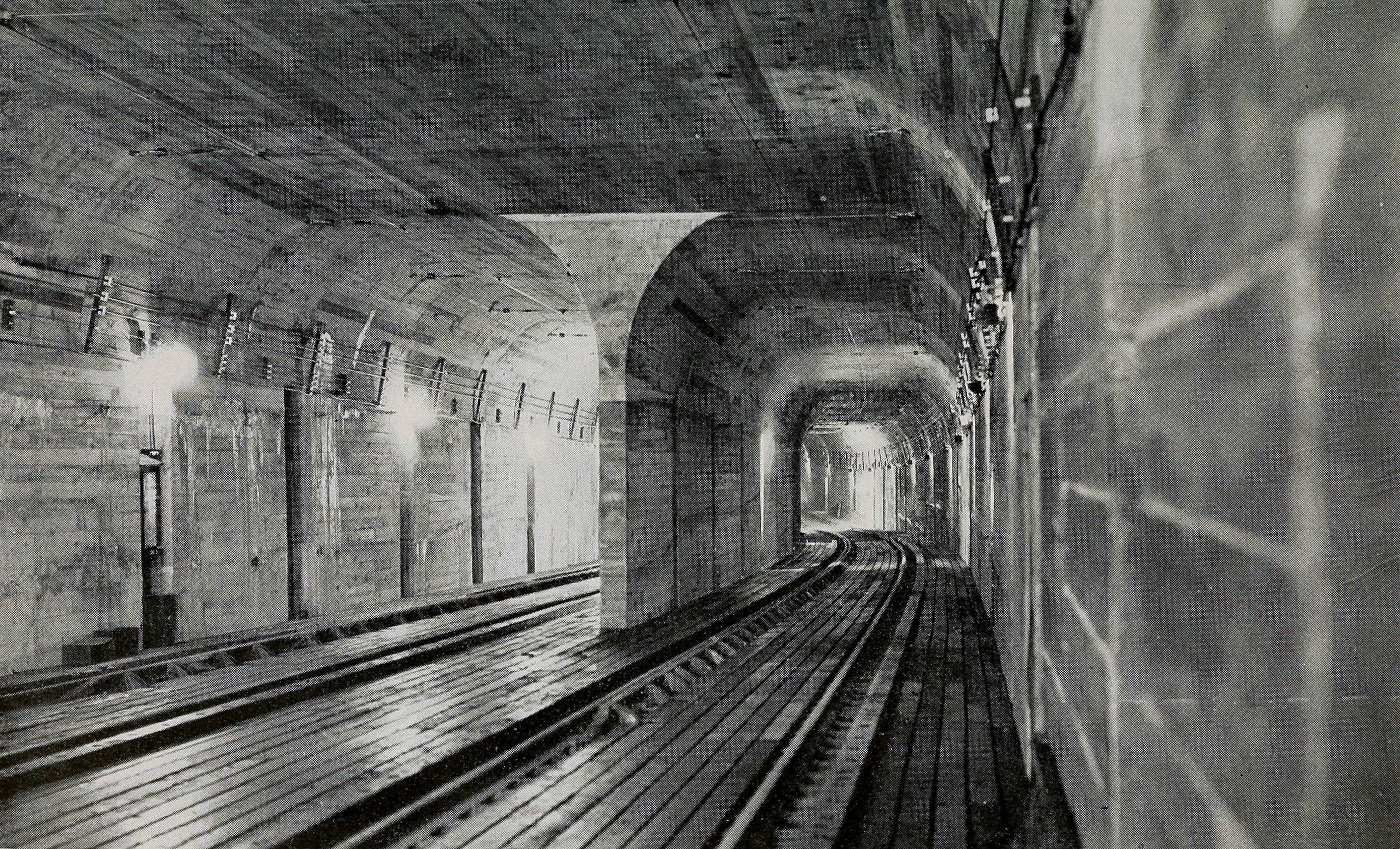
The newly opened subway between Kenmore station and Blandford Street in 1932

The subway under Governors Square was projected to cost $5 million (equivalent to $91 million in 2025). The BERy and the city objected to this cost and proposed a $1.4 million plan where flyover ramps would separate Beacon Street auto and streetcar traffic from other traffic in the square. The tunnel was eventually chosen but construction did not begin until 1930, after the Massachusetts General Court lowered the cost that the BERy would pay to rent the subway from the city. Kenmore station and the new subway, which split to separate portals at Saint Mary's Street on Beacon Street and Blandford Street on Commonwealth Avenue, opened on October 23, 1932. The extension was built to support future rapid transit conversion of the Commonwealth Avenue line, including extension of the underground section further west.

Interest in converting the Commonwealth Avenue line to rapid transit declined as focus shifted to expanding the subway to further suburbs. The 1945 and 1947 Coolidge Commission reports (the next major planning effort after the 1926 report) instead recommended a parallel rapid transit line along the Boston and Albany Railroad corridor, with local streetcar service retained on Commonwealth Avenue. However, several smaller improvements were made to the line. A siding was opened at Washington Street on October 27, 1926, allowing trains to be short turned when necessary. On February 7, 1931, the Beacon Street and Commonwealth Avenue lines were extended to Lechmere, replacing shuttle services between Lechmere and various points in the subway. On June 30, 1931, the existing crossover west of Blandford Street was replaced by a pocket track, allowing temporary storage of streetcars there. It replaced the former surface cutback at Kenmore for subway short turns, which began on September 24, 1934. Around 1940, the Lake Street line was assigned route number 62 as part of a systemwide renumbering. On May 6, 1940, the line was reassigned from Bennett Street Carhouse (near Harvard Square) to Reservoir Carhouse, eliminating the need for deadhead moves on Cambridge Street.

=== Postwar years ===
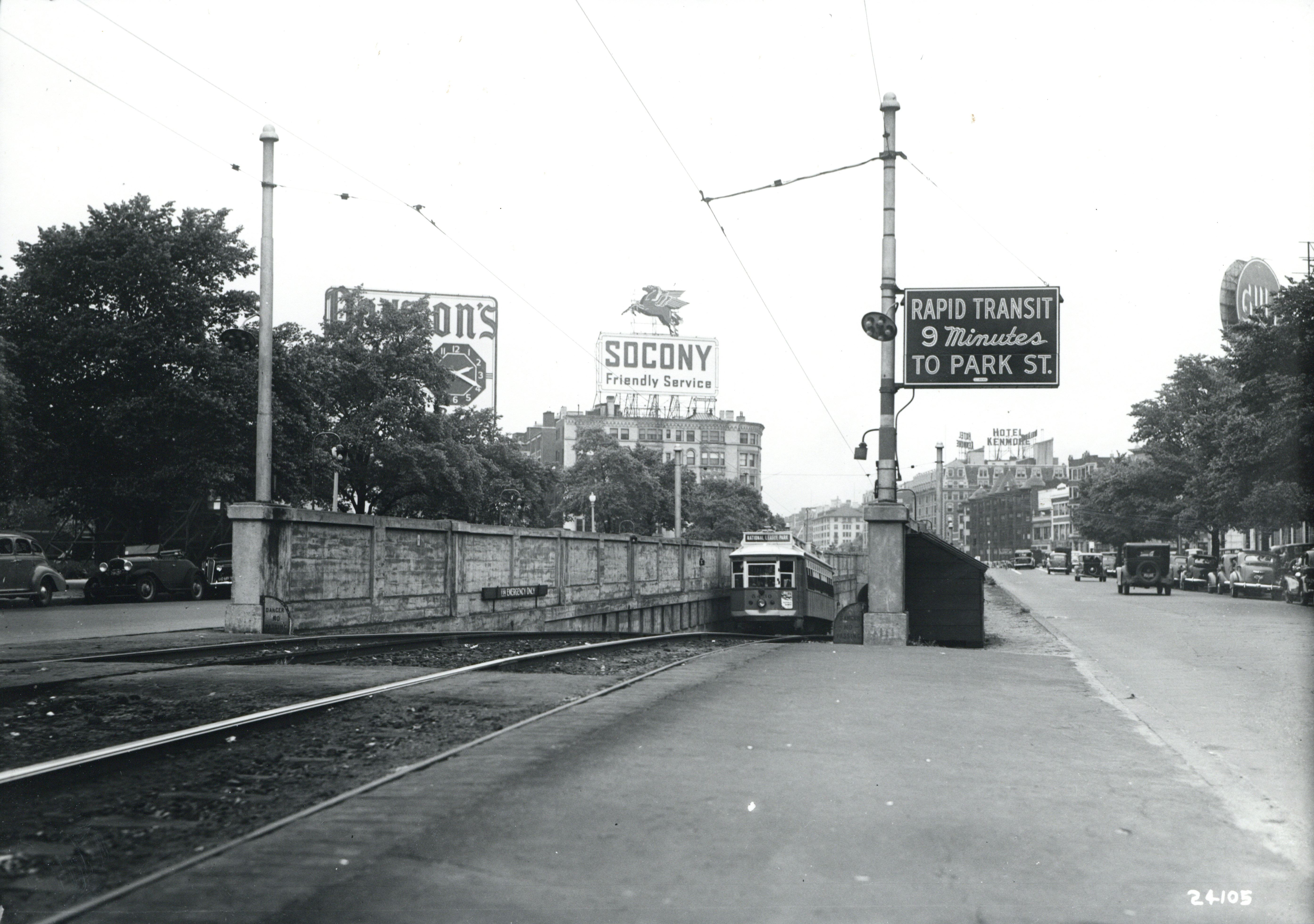
A streetcar bound for Braves Field exiting the Blandford Street portal in 1943

In the early 1940s, the BERy began replacing its older streetcars with the PCC streetcar. PCCs were first used on the Lake Street line in May 1944, and they fully replaced center-entrance cars on the line in regular service on December 10, 1945. The short length of trackage on Chestnut Hill Avenue – which had not been used in revenue service since 1926 – was modified as part of trackwork related to the introduction of the PCCs. A connecting track from Commonwealth Avenue westbound to Chestnut Hill Avenue southbound was opened on May 31, 1947, completing the wye between the two avenues. On May 21, 1947, in recognition of the expansion of Boston College, the BERy changed the "Lake Street" designation to "Boston College". On August 29, 1947, the privately owned BERy was succeeded by the publicly owned Metropolitan Transit Authority (MTA).

The little-used siding at Washington Street was removed in January 1953, leaving only a crossover. In April 1959, all Boston and Albany Railroad Worcester Line stops between Back Bay and Newtonville were closed for the construction of the Turnpike Extension, leaving the Watertown and Boston College lines as the only rail transit serving Allston and Brighton. Boston University purchased Braves Field in 1953 when the Braves moved to Milwaukee, and soon wished to use the loop area for other purposes. After several years of requests, the MTA abandoned the loop on January 15, 1962.

In 1960, the wide streetcar reservation between Warren Street and Wallingford Road was narrowed to add additional travel lanes to Commonwealth Avenue, leaving the streetcar tracks in a relocated median between the travel lanes. On November 25, 1961, the Boston College was cut back to Park Street station, while the 1959-opened Riverside Line was extended to Lechmere in its stead. In 1963–65, the Commonwealth Avenue bridge over the Boston and Albany Railroad was rebuilt to accommodate the Turnpike Extension. Streetcar service was maintained using a temporary parallel bridge.

=== MBTA era ===
In August 1964, the Massachusetts Bay Transportation Authority (MBTA) replaced the MTA. As part of systemwide rebranding efforts, the remaining streetcar routes feeding the Tremont Street subway became the Green Line on August 26, 1965. In 1967, the five branches were given letters to distinguish them; the Boston College line became the B branch. (The Watertown line became the A branch, while the Beacon Street line became the C branch.) The MBTA experimented with changing the downtown terminals of the Green Line branches (unlike its predecessors, which had changed the downtown terminal of the Boston College line just twice.) The B branch was extended to the new loop at Government Center opened on November 18, 1964 – the first service to regularly use the loop. Over the next two decades, the downtown termini were frequently changed; the B branch variously terminated at Park Street, Government Center, Haymarket, North Station, and Lechmere. On July 30, 1983, the terminus was finally changed to Government Center station, where it would stay until 2004.

On June 21, 1969, the A branch was replaced with Watertown–Kenmore buses, halving streetcar service on Commonwealth Avenue east of Packard's Corner. In 1970, the median was moved slightly south between Chestnut Hill Avenue and Lake Street. The westbound roadway was lowered several feet below the median between South Street and Greycliff Road, with the Foster Street stop moved 500 feet (150 m) west to the Greycliff Road grade crossing. Around 1975, the stop at University Road was discontinued, while the stop at Alcorn Street was moved 500 feet east to Babcock Street.

The downtown terminus was extended to North Station on June 25, 2004, but cut back to Government Center on January 1, 2005. It was cut back further to Park Street on March 22, 2014, when Government Center closed for reconstruction. When the station reopened in 2016, Park Street remained the B branch terminus. The B branch was re-extended to Government Center on October 24, 2021, as part of changes in preparation for the opening of the Green Line Extension the next year. The B branch extension was intended to improve access to the Blue Line and better distribute downtown service. B branch service was replaced by buses from June 20 to July 1, 2022, to allow for trackwork and installation of train protection system equipment.

=== Accessibility and stop consolidation ===
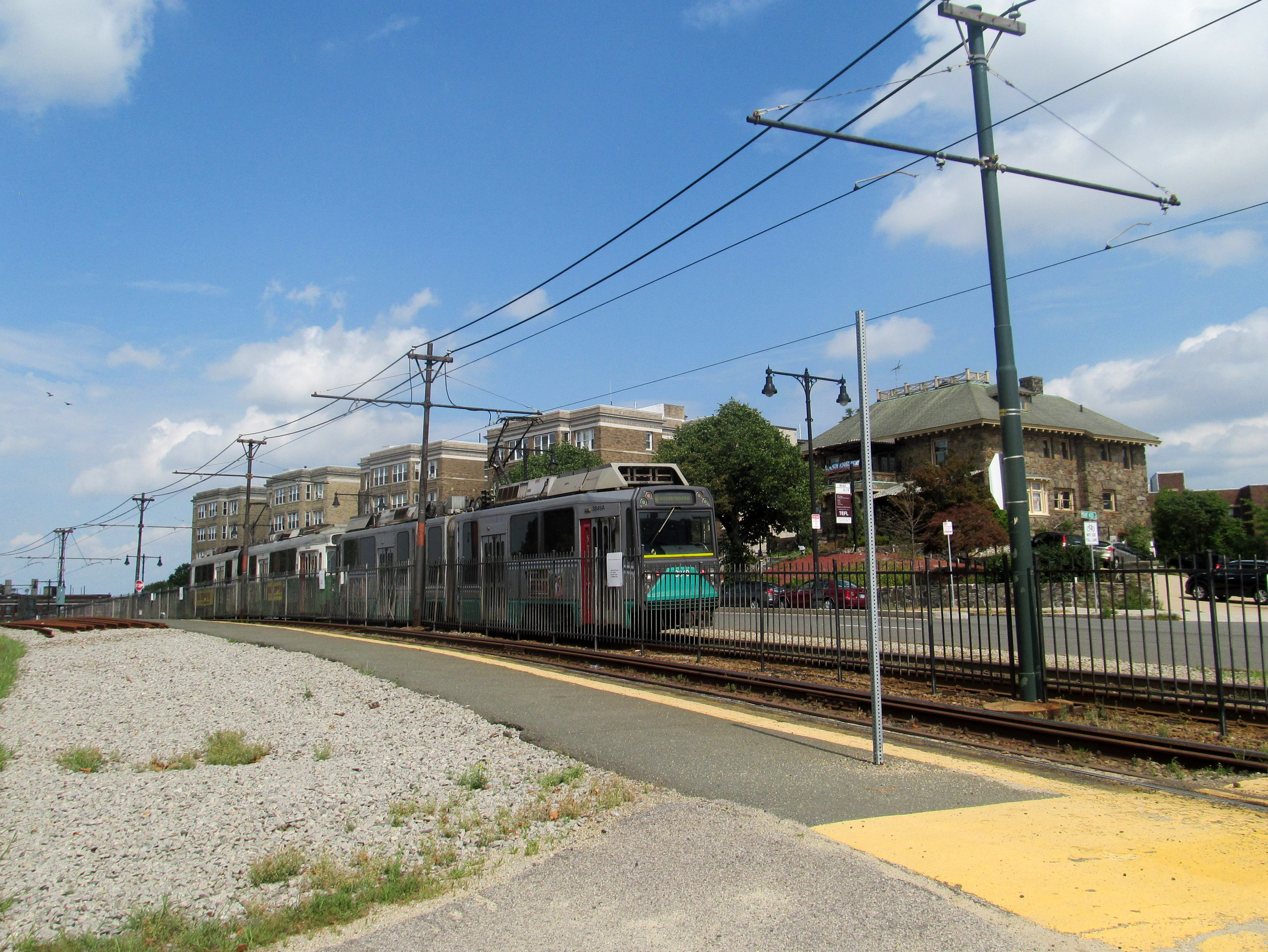
Mount Hood Road stop (outbound platform pictured) was closed in 2004.

The introduction of low-floor LRVs in 2000 allowed for accessible service on the Green Line. In the early 2000s, the MBTA modified key surface stops with raised platforms as part of the Light Rail Accessibility Program. Portable lifts were installed at Boston College and Boston University Central around 2000. Four surface stops – Boston University East, Boston University Central, Harvard Avenue, and Washington Street – were modified with raised platforms in 2002–03; Boston College was similarly modified in 2009.

The B branch is frequently criticized by riders for its slow service, with a high number of stops and level crossings. Until 2004, the line had 22 stops on the surface section, while the C and D branches had 13 each and the E branch just 9. In late 2003, the MBTA proposed eliminating five surface stops (Greycliff Road, Chiswick Road, Mount Hood Road, Summit Avenue, and Fordham Road) as part of a project to improve the line. The five stops were chosen because they had low ridership and were located very close to other stations. After a public comment period, Chiswick Road was removed from the proposal, as it served a nearby elderly housing community. On April 20, 2004, the other four stops were closed as a 6-to-8-month pilot program. On March 15, 2005, after a survey showed that 73% of 1,142 riders surveyed approved of the closures, the MBTA board voted to make the closures permanent.

In 2014, the MBTA began planning to consolidate four stops – Boston University West, Saint Paul Street, Pleasant Street, and Babcock Street – located near Boston University's West Campus. The four stops, which were not accessible, were replaced by two fully accessible stops as part of a reconstruction of Commonwealth Avenue between the BU Bridge and Packard's Corner. The MBTA awarded a $17.8 million construction contract on March 23, 2020. Construction was to last from February 2021 to early 2022, with night and weekend bustitution for much of 2021. Stop names of "Babcock Street" and "Amory Street" were announced in February 2021. Buses replaced rail service between Washington Street and Kenmore from April 17–May 9 and May 17–June 13, 2021, for construction of the platforms and canopy steelwork. Track replacement was also conducted between Blandford Street and BU Central during the closure. The two new stations, Babcock Street and Amory Street, opened on November 15, 2021.

Track work in 2018–19, which included replacement of platform edges at several stops, triggered requirements for accessibility modifications at those stops. Design work for Packards Corner, Sutherland Road, Chiswick Road, Chestnut Hill Avenue, and South Street was 30% complete by December 2022. Designs shown in March 2024 called for Chestnut Hill Avenue station and South Street station to be consolidated into a single station as part of the project. In May 2024, the Federal Transit Administration awarded the MBTA $67 million to construct accessible platforms at the 14 B and C branch stops. Five stations not originally included in the project were added in 2024: Blandford Street will be closed, Griggs Street rebuilt, Allston Street and Warren Street consolidated into a single station, and Boston College relocated. The MBTA issued a request for proposals for a design-build contract in late 2025.

By July 2026, the MBTA expected to issue a $73 million design-build contract in August 2026, with construction lasting from mid-2027 to late 2028. Bids received were higher than expected, with the low bid at $80.6 million. In October 2026, the MBTA indicated the project was being rescoped; the contract would be rebid and awarded in 2027, with construction lasting through 2028.

In 2021, the MBTA indicated that a longer-term project may replace side platforms with wider island platforms at some or all surface stops. That full project of station consolidation and renovations, as well as track realignment and traction power improvements, was expected to cost $221 million. A reconstruction and expansion of Lake Street Yard to support new Type 10 LRVs is planned for the late 2020s.

== Station listing ==
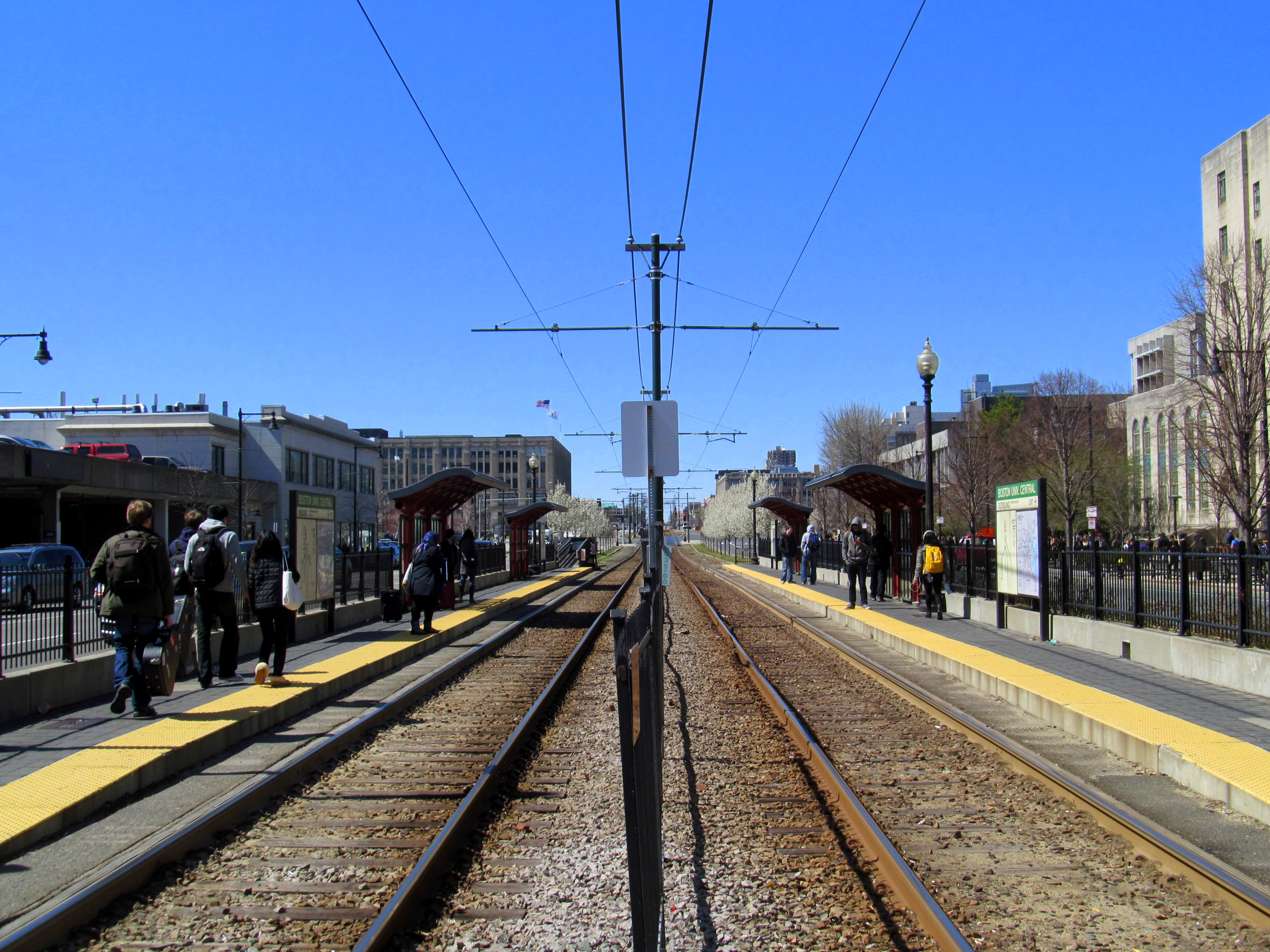
Boston University Central, one of the seven accessible surface stations on the line

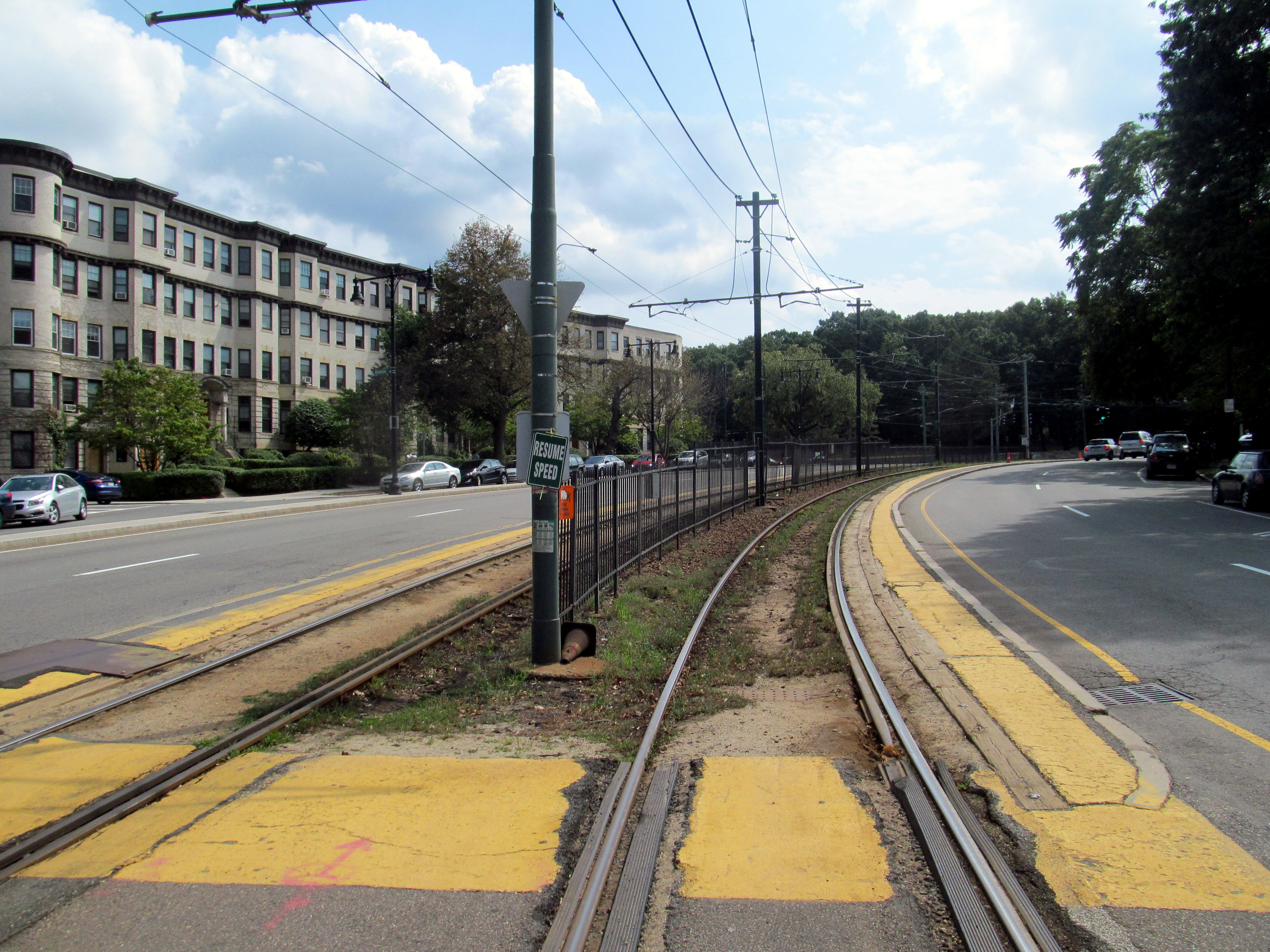
Chestnut Hill Avenue, a typical non-accessible station on the line

Location	Station	Opened	Notes and connections
East Cambridge	Lechmere	March 21, 2022	Original surface station was open from July 10, 1922 to May 23, 2020; it had not served the B branch since March 21, 1980. Current station for D and E branches.
West End	Science Park	August 20, 1955	Current station for D and E branches; has not served B branch since March 21, 1980.
North End	North Station	June 28, 2004	Current station for D and E branches; has not served B branch since December 31, 2004
North End	Haymarket	September 3, 1898	Current station for D and E branches; has not served B branch since December 31, 2004
Downtown; Boston	Government Center	September 3, 1898	MBTA subway: Blue Line; MBTA bus: 354
Downtown; Boston	Park Street	September 1, 1897	MBTA subway: Red Line, Silver Line (SL5); MBTA bus: 43; At Downtown Crossing: Orange Line; 7, 11, 501, 504, 505
Downtown; Boston	Boylston	September 1, 1897	MBTA subway: Silver Line (SL5); MBTA bus: 43
Back Bay	Arlington	November 13, 1921	MBTA bus: 9, 10, 55, 501, 504
Back Bay	Copley	October 3, 1914	MBTA bus: 9, 10, 39, 55, 501, 504
Back Bay	Hynes Convention Center	October 3, 1914	MBTA bus: 1, 55
Fenway–Kenmore	Kenmore	October 23, 1932	MBTA bus: 8, 19, 57, 60; At Lansdowne: Framingham/Worcester Line
Boston University	Blandford Street	c. 1894	MBTA bus: 57
Boston University	Boston University East	c. 1894	MBTA bus: 57
Boston University	Boston University Central	c. 1894	MBTA bus: 47, 57, 85
Boston University	University Road	c. 1894	Closed c. 1975
Boston University	Amory Street	November 15, 2021	MBTA bus: 57
Allston	Babcock Street	November 15, 2021	MBTA bus: 57
Allston	Packards Corner	c. 1895	MBTA bus: 57
Allston	Fordham Road	May 26, 1900	Closed April 20, 2004
Allston	Harvard Avenue	May 26, 1900	MBTA bus: 66
Allston	Griggs Street	May 26, 1900	
Allston	Allston Street	May 26, 1900	
Brighton	Warren Street	May 26, 1900	
Brighton	Summit Avenue	May 26, 1900	Closed April 20, 2004
Brighton	Washington Street	May 26, 1900	MBTA bus: 65
Brighton	Mount Hood Road	May 26, 1900	Closed April 20, 2004
Brighton	Sutherland Road	May 26, 1900	
Brighton	Leamington Road	May 26, 1900	Closed June 21, 1980
Brighton	Chiswick Road	May 26, 1900	
Brighton	Chestnut Hill Avenue	August 15, 1896	MBTA bus: 86
Brighton	South Street	August 15, 1896	
Brighton	Greycliff Road	c. 1970	Moved from Foster Street around 1970; closed April 20, 2004
Brighton/Newton	Boston College	August 15, 1896	
