= Chiswick Road station =

MBTA subway station

Chiswick Road
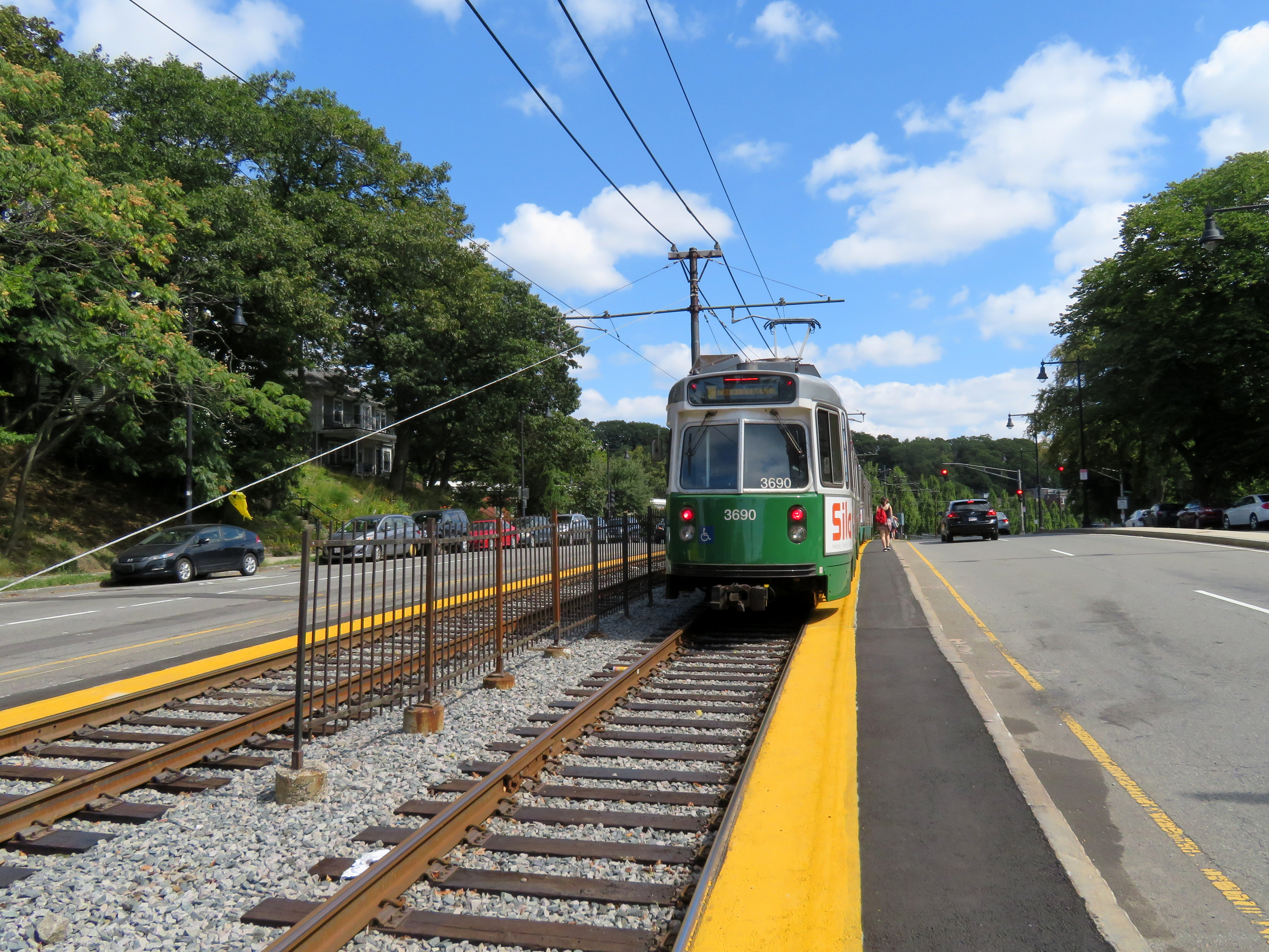
- An inbound train at Chiswick Road station in August 2018

General information
- Location: Commonwealth Avenue at Chiswick Road; Brighton, Boston, Massachusetts
- Coordinates: 42.34066°N 71.15092°W
- Platforms: 2 side platforms
- Tracks: 2

Construction
- Accessible: No

History
- Opened: May 26, 1900
- Rebuilt: 2027–2028 (planned)

Passengers
- 2011: 615 daily boardings

Services
Preceding station	MBTA	Following station
Chestnut Hill Avenue toward Boston College	Green Line B branch	Sutherland Road toward Government Center
Location

Chiswick Road station is a light rail station on the MBTA's Green Line B branch, located in the median of Commonwealth Avenue north of Chiswick Road in the Brighton neighborhood of Boston, Massachusetts. Chiswick Road consists of two side platforms, which serve the B branch's two tracks.

== History ==
In 2003, Chiswick Road was one of five stops on the B branch proposed for closure due to its low average daily ridership and proximity to more-used stops. Chiswick Road was dropped from the proposal shortly after it was announced due to opposition from residents of a local housing project for the elderly served by the stop. The other four stops (Fordham Road, Summit Avenue, Mount Hood Road, and Greycliff Road) were provisionally closed on April 20, 2004, which was made permanent on March 15, 2005.

Track work in 2018–19, which included replacement of platform edges at several stops, triggered requirements for accessibility modifications at those stops. Design for Chiswick Road and four other B Branch stops was 30% complete by December 2022. A design shown in March 2024 called for the platforms to be rebuilt at their current locations. In May 2024, the Federal Transit Administration awarded the MBTA $67 million to construct accessible platforms at 14 B and C branch stops including Chiswick Road. Additional stops were added to the B branch project in 2024. By July 2026, the MBTA expected to issue a $73 million design-build contract in August 2026, with construction lasting from mid-2027 to late 2028. Bids received were higher than expected. In October 2026, the MBTA indicated the project was being rescoped; the contract would be rebid and awarded in 2027, with construction lasting through 2028.
