= Boston University East station =

Light rail station in Boston, Massachusetts, US

Boston University East
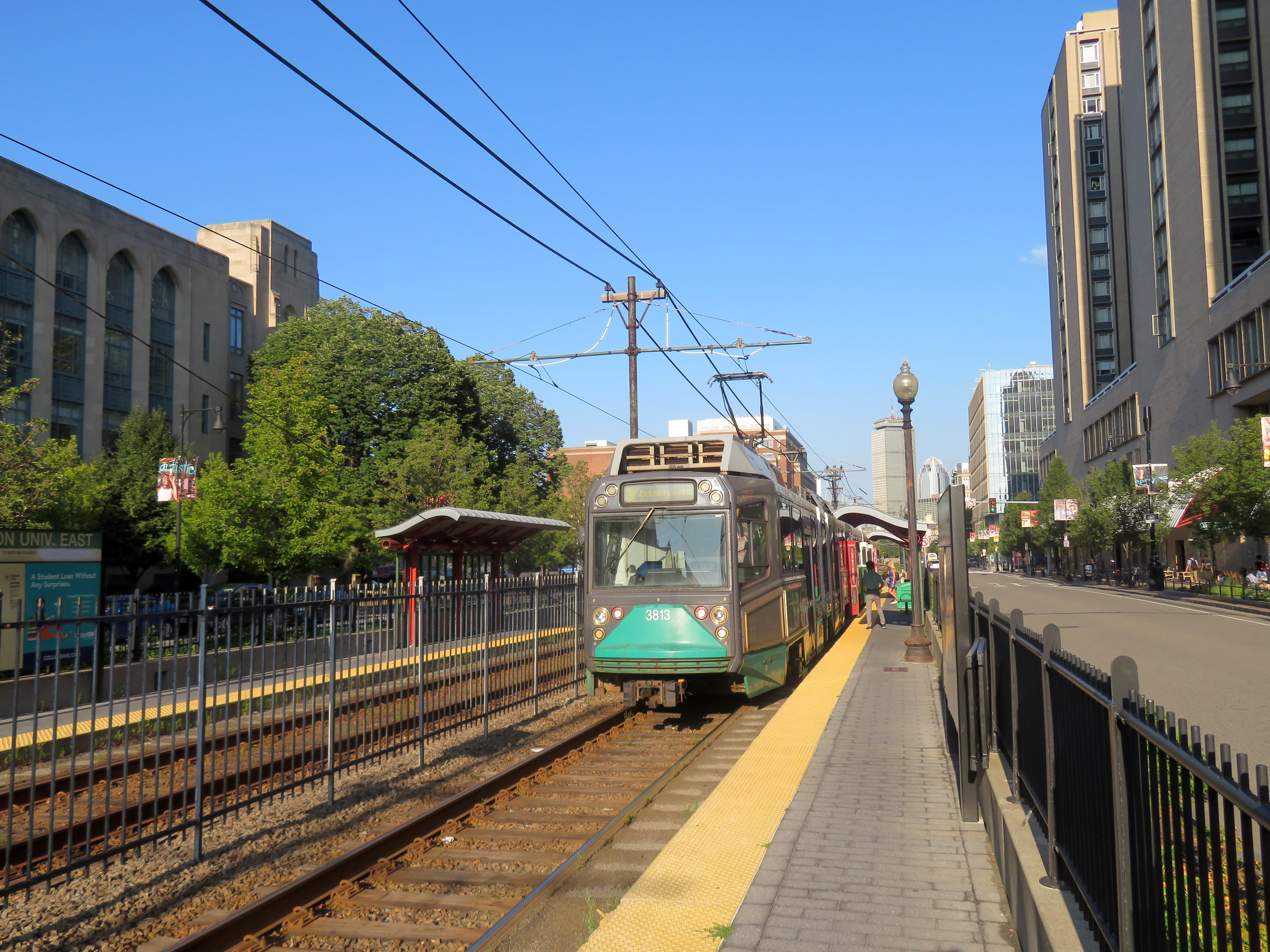
- An inbound train at Boston University East station in July 2019

General information
- Location: Commonwealth Avenue at Granby Street; Boston, Massachusetts
- Coordinates: 42.34974°N 71.10434°W
- Platforms: 2 side platforms
- Tracks: 2
- Connections: MBTA bus: 57

Construction
- Accessible: Yes

History
- Opened: 1894
- Rebuilt: March 18, 2002–November 18, 2003
- Former names: Granby Street

Passengers
- 2011: 1,747 daily boardings

Services
Preceding station	MBTA	Following station
Boston University Central toward Boston College	Green Line B branch	Blandford Street toward Government Center
Former services
Preceding station	MBTA	Following station
St. Mary's Street toward Watertown	Green Line A branch Discontinued 1969	Blandford Street toward Park Street
Location

Boston University East station is a surface-level light rail station on the MBTA Green Line B branch located in Boston, Massachusetts. The station is located in the center median of Commonwealth Avenue, between Granby Street and the eastern end of Cummington Street, surrounded by the Boston University campus. It consists of two side platforms, which serve the B branch's two tracks.

== History ==
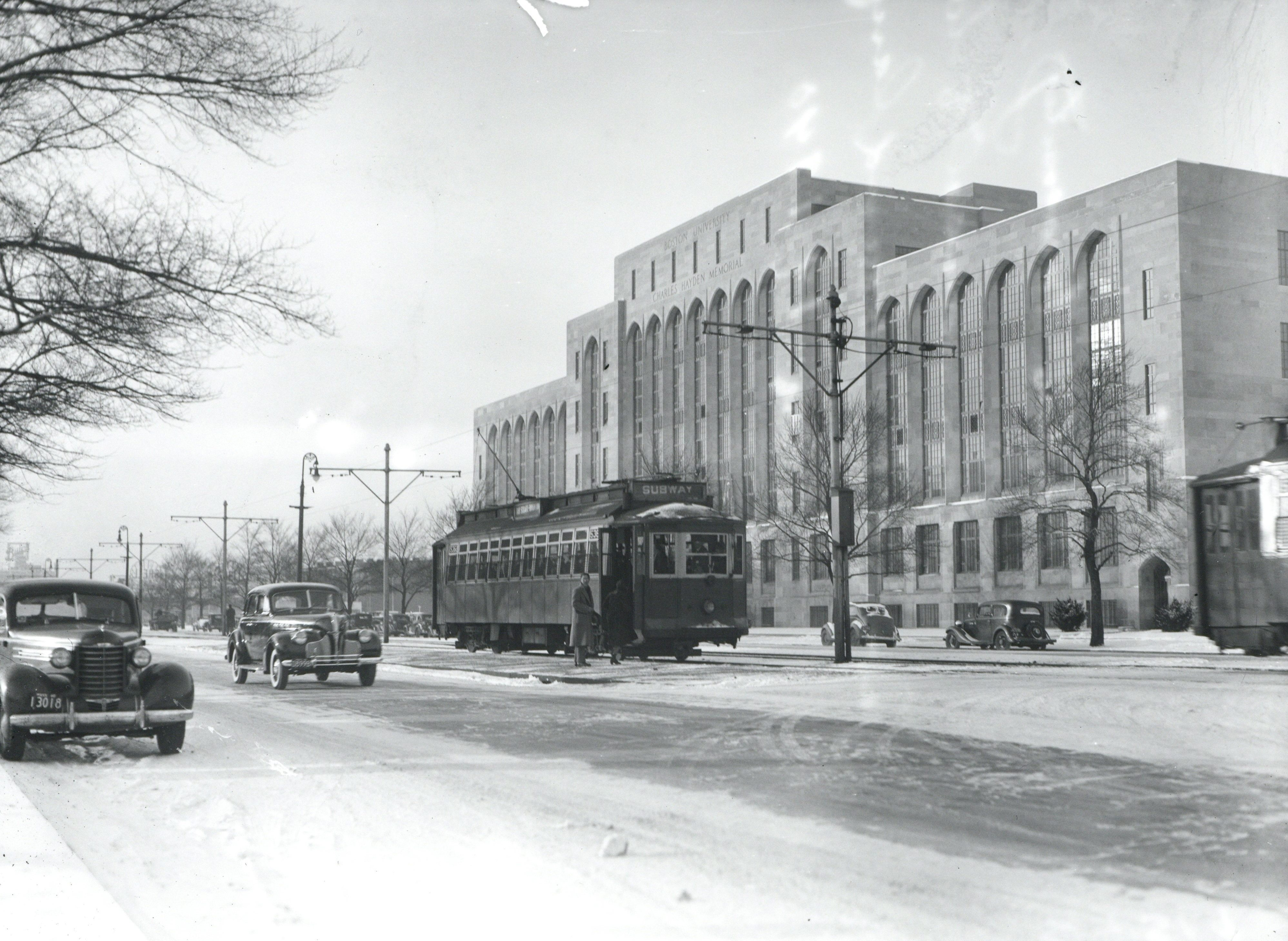
A streetcar at the station in the 1940s

Owing to its location in front of Warren Towers dormitory and Boston University's College of Arts and Sciences, Boston University East has the sixth-highest ridership of stations on the B branch. In the early 2000s, the MBTA modified key surface stops with raised platforms for accessibility. Construction at Boston University Central and Boston University East was part of a $32 million modification of thirteen B, C, and E branch stations. During construction, an interim station with temporary platforms between the two stops was used. Construction began on March 18, 2002, a week behind schedule due to delays in finishing up similar work at Harvard Avenue and Washington Street. The project was then expected to be completed within six months.

However, poor weather and limited work periods (as most work could only be done during the four hours at night that no trains used the line) delayed the completion date first to December 2002, then March 2003. The contractor informed the MBTA in early 2003 that they would be unable to complete the work; a new contractor was chosen in mid-2003, but work did not resume until September. The stations were completed and reopened on November 18, 2003.

In March 2024, the MBTA indicated that it was considering future consolidation of Blandford Street and Boston University East into a single station.
