= Boston University Central station =

Light rail station in Boston, Massachusetts, US

Boston University Central
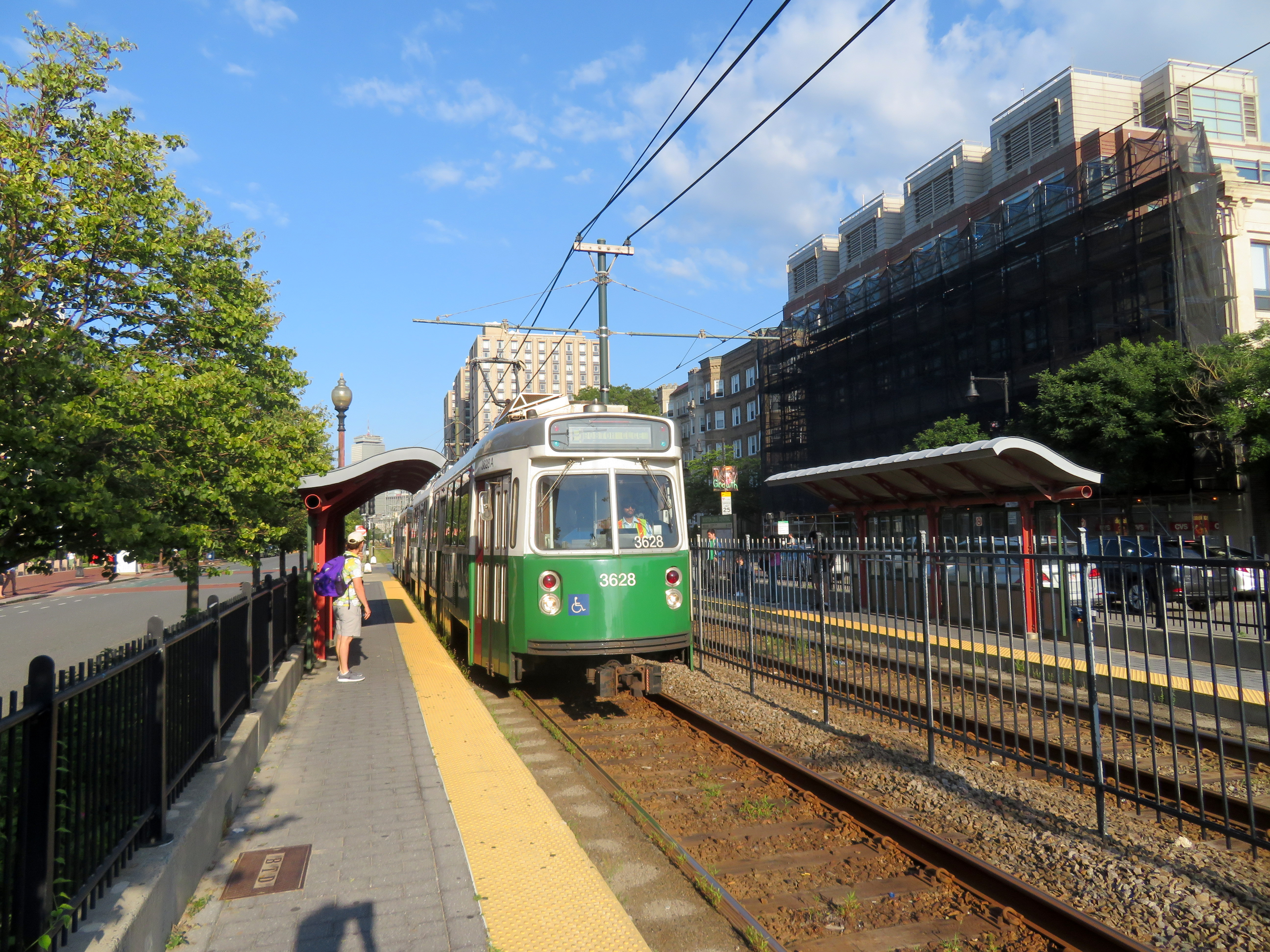
- An outbound train at the station in July 2019

General information
- Location: Commonwealth Avenue at St. Marys Street; Boston, Massachusetts
- Coordinates: 42.35008°N 71.10720°W
- Platforms: 2 side platforms
- Tracks: 2
- Connections: MBTA bus: 47, 57, 85

Construction
- Accessible: Yes

History
- Opened: 1894
- Rebuilt: March 18, 2002–November 18, 2003
- Former names: St. Mary's Street

Passengers
- 2011: 2,194 daily boardings

Services
Preceding station	MBTA	Following station
Amory Street toward Boston College	Green Line B branch	Boston University East toward Government Center
Former services
Preceding station	MBTA	Following station
University Road toward Watertown	Green Line A branch Discontinued 1969	Boston University East toward Park Street
Location

Boston University Central station is a surface-level light rail station on the MBTA Green Line B branch, located the center median of Commonwealth Avenue west of St. Marys Street in Boston, Massachusetts, surrounded by the Boston University campus. It consists of two side platforms, which serve the B branch's two tracks. The station is accessible, with raised platforms to allow level boarding onto low-floor trams and a high platform on the inbound side to serve high-floor light rail vehicles.

== History ==
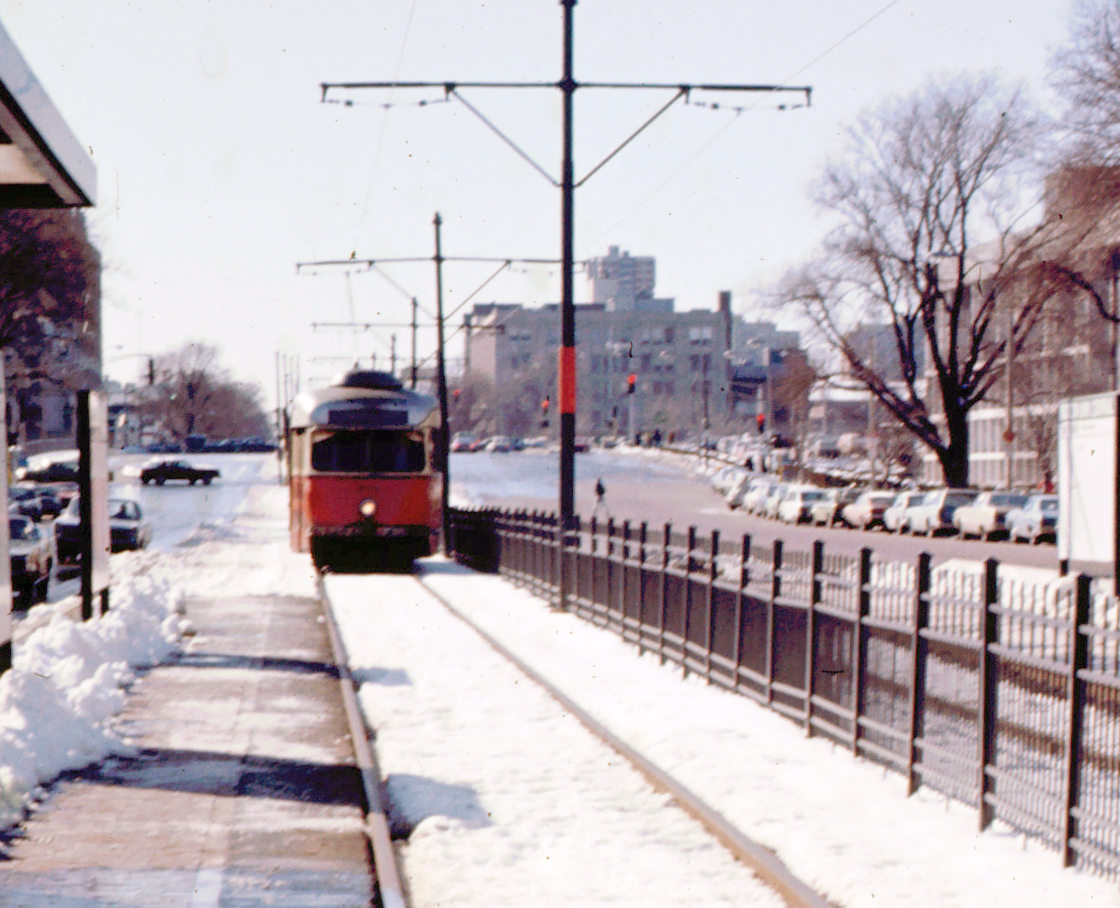
A streetcar at the station in 1977

The station has the third-highest ridership on the B branch (after only Harvard Avenue and Packards Corner). In the early 2000s, the MBTA modified key surface stops with raised platforms for accessibility. Portable lifts were installed at Boston University Central around 2000 as a temporary measure. Construction at Boston University Central and Boston University East was part of a $32 million modification of thirteen B, C, and E branch stations. During construction, an interim station with temporary platforms between the two stops was used. Construction began on March 18, 2002, a week behind schedule due to delays in finishing up similar work at Harvard Avenue and Washington Street. The project was then expected to be completed within six months.

However, poor weather and limited work periods (as most work could only be done during the four hours at night that no trains used the line) delayed the completion date first to December 2002, then March 2003. The contractor informed the MBTA in early 2003 that they would be unable to complete the work; a new contractor was chosen in mid-2003, but work did not resume until September. The stations were completed and reopened on November 18, 2003.

Around 2006, the MBTA added a wooden mini-high platform on the inbound side, allowing level boarding on older Type 7 LRVs. These platforms were installed at eight Green Line stations in 2006–07 as part of the settlement of Joanne Daniels-Finegold, et al. v. MBTA.

Nearby stops were proposed on the Urban Ring – a circumferential bus rapid transit (BRT) line designed to connect the existing radial MBTA rail lines to reduce overcrowding in the downtown stations. Under draft plans released in 2008, the Urban Ring would have run over the Grand Junction Railroad Bridge, on a dedicated busway under the Boston University Bridge, and along University Road and Mountfort Street. A southbound BRT stop would have been located on University Road, with the northbound stop on Mountfort Street near Carlton Street. The project was cancelled in 2010.
