= Chestnut Hill Avenue station =

Light rail station in Boston, Massachusetts

Chestnut Hill Avenue
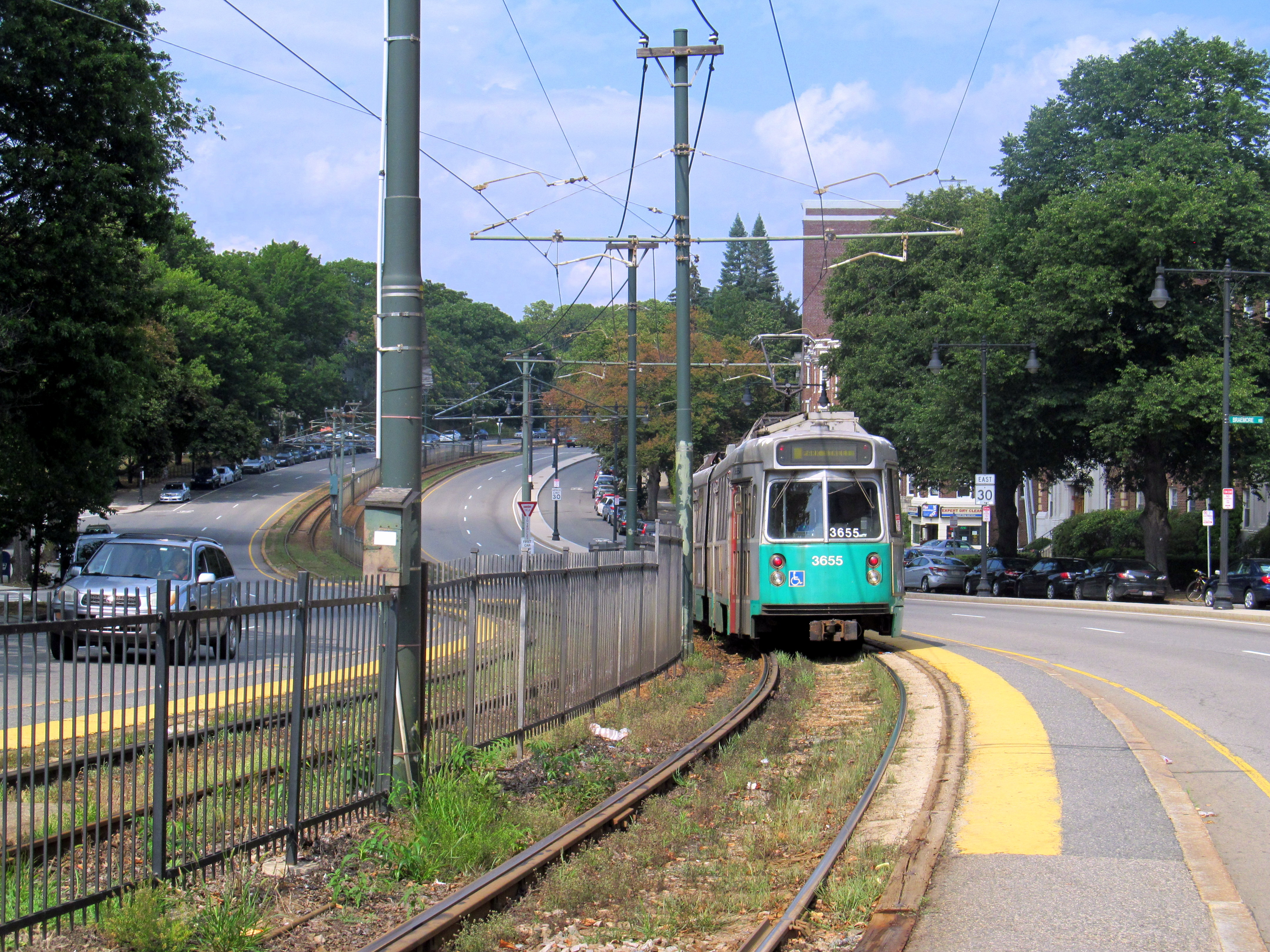
- An inbound train at Chestnut Hill Avenue station in 2016

General information
- Location: Commonwealth Avenue at Chestnut Hill Avenue; Brighton, Boston, Massachusetts
- Coordinates: 42.33843°N 71.15281°W
- Platforms: 2 side platforms
- Tracks: 2
- Connections: MBTA bus: 86

Construction
- Accessible: No

History
- Rebuilt: 2027–2028 (planned)

Passengers
- 2011: 626 daily boardings

Services
Preceding station	MBTA	Following station
South Street toward Boston College	Green Line B branch	Chiswick Road toward Government Center
Location

Chestnut Hill Avenue station is a light rail surface stop on the MBTA Green Line B branch, located in the median of Commonwealth Avenue just east of Chestnut Hill Avenue in the Brighton neighborhood of Boston, Massachusetts. Chestnut Hill Avenue has two low-level platforms, serving the B branch's two tracks; the stop is not accessible.

Just to the west of the station, there is a wye connecting the B branch to non-revenue tracks that run along Chestnut Hill Avenue to Reservoir Carhouse at Cleveland Circle. The tracks are used to supply the B branch with cars before rush hour, as the carhouse at Boston College has limited storage area. The leg of the wye leading from the westbound B branch to the non-revenue tracks is out of service and paved over.

== History ==
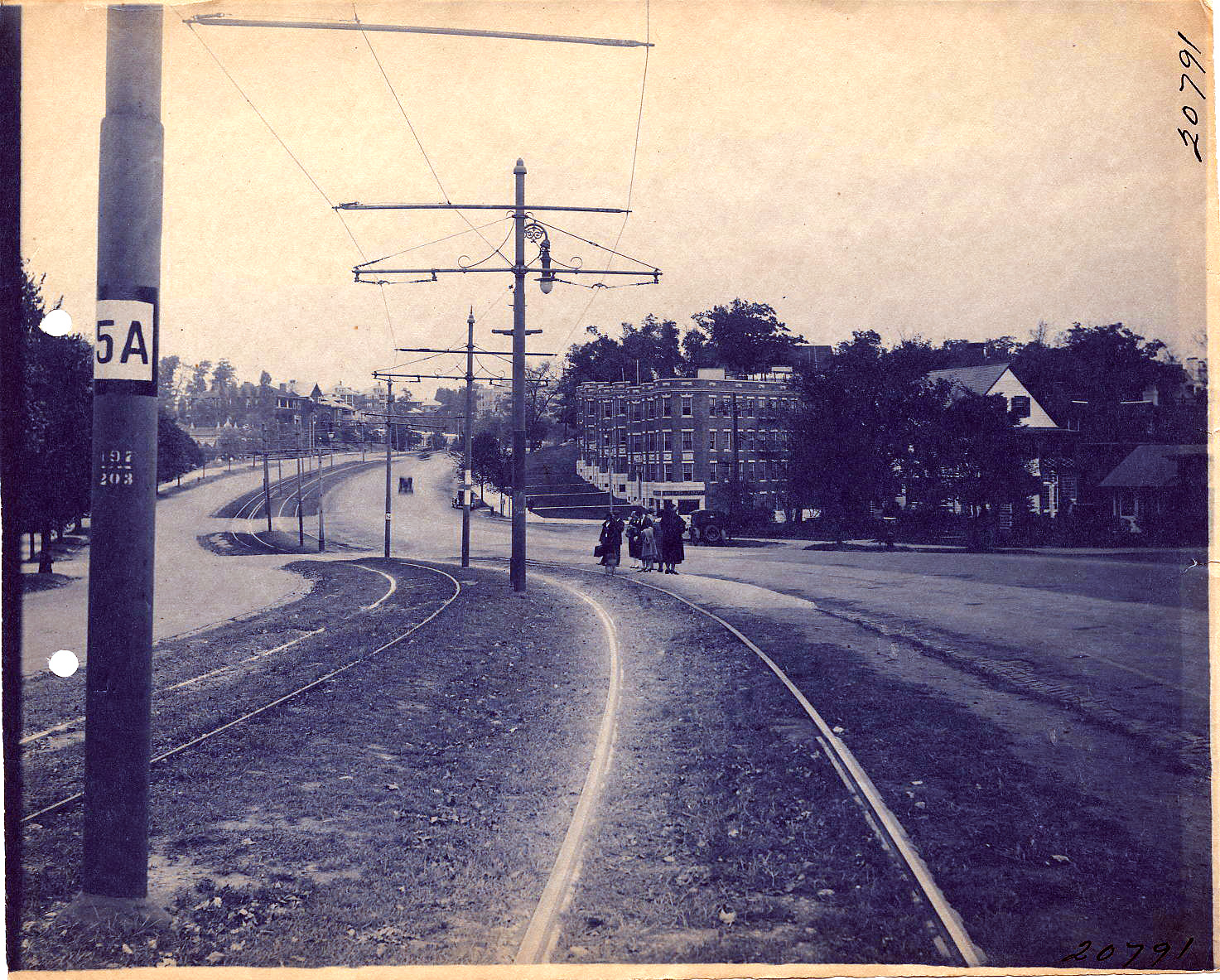
Passengers waiting at Braemore Road in the 1910s

On May 14, 2008, an outbound train derailed at Chestnut Hill Avenue. It struck a nearby utility pole, which brought down the overhead wires, causing the light rail vehicle to catch fire. No injuries were reported, but the vehicle suffered significant damage.

Track work in 2018–19, which included replacement of platform edges at several stops, triggered requirements for accessibility modifications at those stops. Design for Chestnut Hill Avenue and four other B Branch stops was 30% complete by December 2022. A design shown in March 2024 called for Chestnut Hill Avenue station and South Street station to be consolidated, with a single station located between Chestnut Hill Driveway and Chestnut Hill Avenue. In May 2024, the Federal Transit Administration awarded the MBTA $67 million to construct accessible platforms at 14 B and C branch stops including the combined Chestnut Hill Avenue/South Street station.

Additional stops were added to the B branch project in 2024. By July 2026, the MBTA expected to issue a $73 million design-build contract in August 2026, with construction lasting from mid-2027 to late 2028. Bids received were higher than expected. In October 2026, the MBTA indicated the project was being rescoped; the contract would be rebid and awarded in 2027, with construction lasting through 2028.
