= Corey Hill, Brookline, Massachusetts =

Neighborhood of Brookline, Massachusetts, US

- Neighborhood
- Interactive map of Corey Hill, Brookline, Massachusetts
- Coordinates: 42°20′33″N 71°08′01″W
- Country: United States
- State: Massachusetts
- County: Norfolk County
- Municipality: Brookline

Corey Hill is a neighborhood of Brookline, Massachusetts, United States, centered on a homonymous hill rising 260 ft above sea level directly adjacent to the Boston neighborhood of Brighton. The neighborhood takes its name from Timothy Corey, a farmer and soldier of the American Revolutionary War who settled on the hill in the 1760s.

== Sites ==
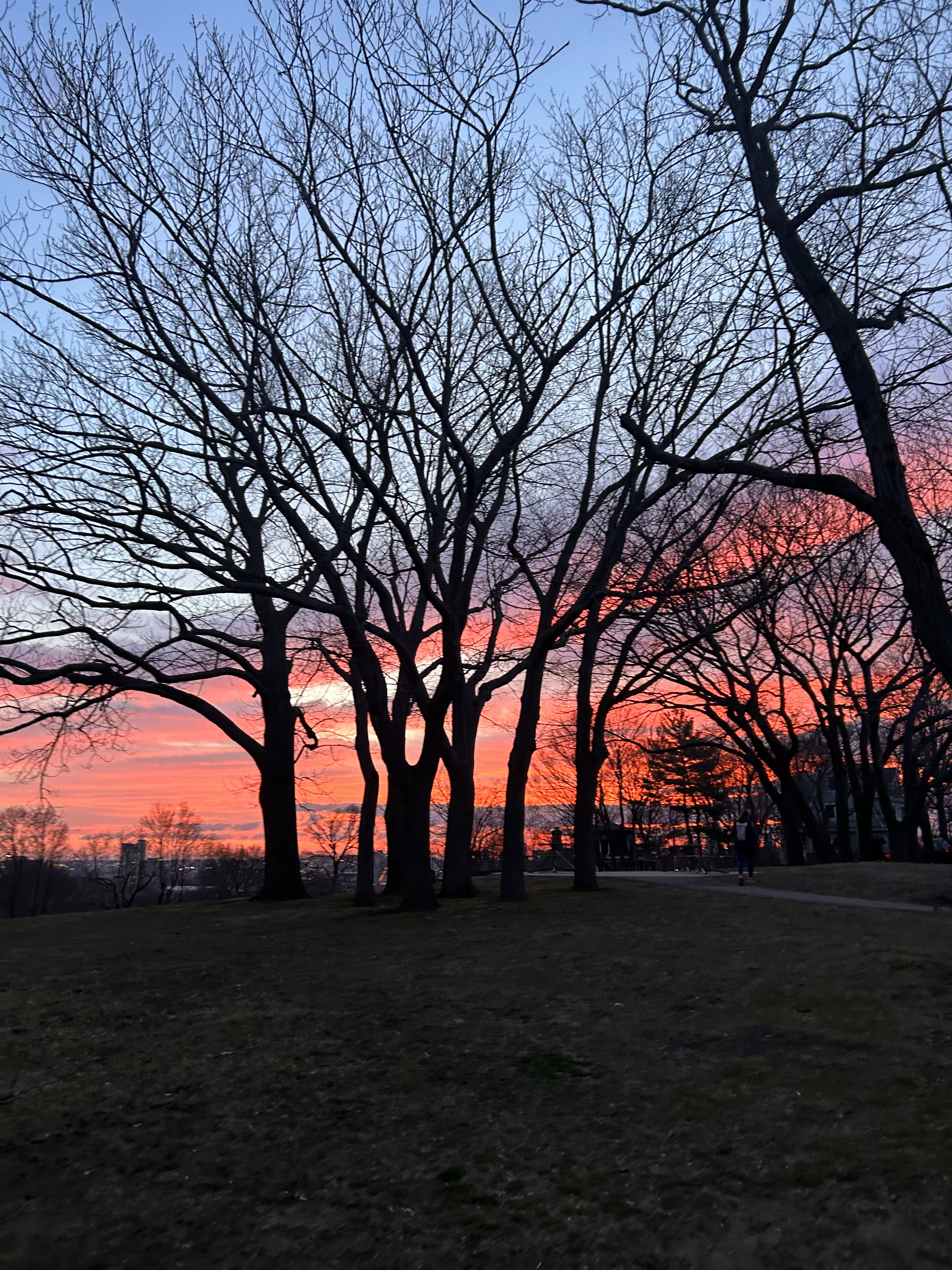
Northern parcel of Corey Hill Park

- Corey Hill Park is a public park on the summit of Corey Hill. The park is split into two sections by Summit Avenue, comprising a southern parcel with a playground and a northern parcel with a sloped lawn overlooking Boston and Cambridge.
- The House at 156 Mason Terrace is an elaborately decorated 2-1/2 story historic house constructed c. 1888-90.
- The Lynch-O'Gorman House is a historic Queen Anne Victorian house on Mason Terrace that was constructed in 1889.
- Corey Hill is home to three of the 17 pedestrian paths in Brookline. These paths serve as pedestrian shortcuts connecting the circuitous roads tracing the steep hills of Brookline, primarily via steep concrete stairwells.
  - Summit Path is a 791-foot-long pedestrian path connecting Beacon Street and the summit of Corey Hill, comprising three sections of concrete stairs bisecting York Terrace, Mason Terrace, and Lancaster Terrace.
  - Winchester Path is a 310-foot-long set of concrete stairs connecting Mason Terrace and Winchester Street.
  - Mason Path is a 178-foot-long set of concrete stairs connecting Mason Terrace and Lancaster Terrace. It is the shortest of the 17 paths of Brookline.

== Public transportation ==
Corey Hill is situated between the MBTA's Green Line B and C branches. The neighborhood is served primarily by the Summit Avenue, Brandon Hall, and Fairbanks Street stations of the Green Line C branch.

The #65 MBTA bus line operates along Washington Street, abutting Corey Hill.

== Education ==
Corey Hill is home to the Michael Driscoll School, a K-8 public school on Westbourne Terrace.
