= Washington Square (Brookline) =

Coordinates: 42.3393°N 71.1353°W

Washington Square, Brookline, Massachusetts
- Neighborhood of Brookline, Massachusetts
- Interactive map of Washington Square, Brookline, Massachusetts

Washington Square is a neighborhood in Brookline, Massachusetts, United States.

== Geography ==
Washington Square is located in North Brookline along Beacon Street. Located one mile from Coolidge Corner, the area contains several stores for both shopping and eating. The small hub has attracted several nice restaurants and other unique facilities.

== Culture ==
Washington Square features attractive brownstone buildings which line both sides of Beacon Street and leafy side streets. The Washington Square clock, a green 18-foot Victorian icon, resides in the middle of the Square. Other clocks in Cleveland Circle and Brighton Center have been modeled off the attractive original in Washington Square.

The neighborhood is home to a number of eateries, many of which feature outdoor sidewalk terraces for drinking and dining.

The Michael Driscoll School, one of Brookline's eight public elementary schools, is located in Washington Square.

== Public transportation ==
=== Light rail and subway ===
Washington Square is a stop of the MBTA's Green Line C branch, between Coolidge Corner and Cleveland Circle.

=== Bus ===
The MBTA's 65 Bus passes through Washington Square on Washington Street.
