= Saint Mary's Street station =

Light rail station in Brookline, Massachusetts, US

Saint Mary's Street
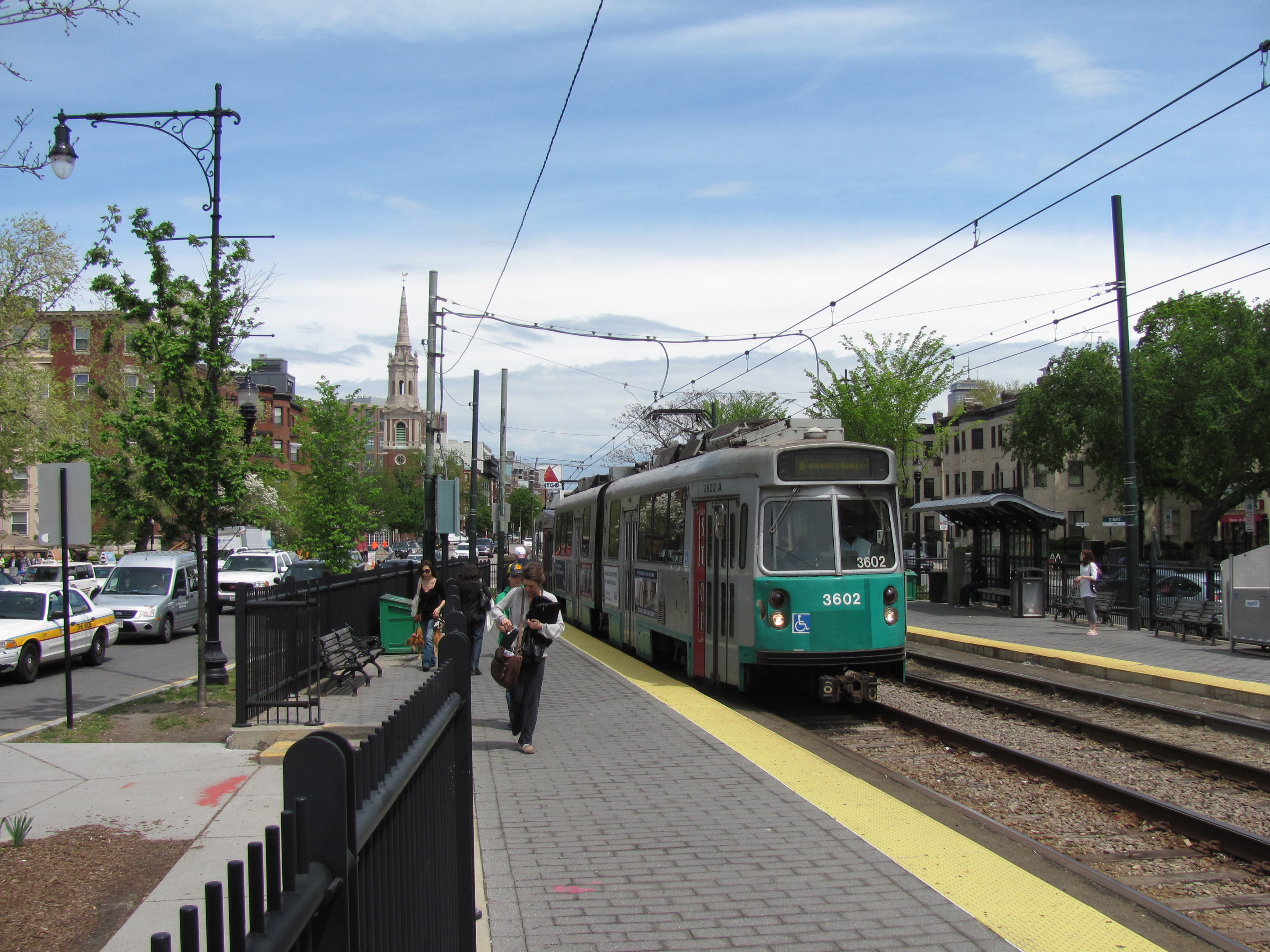
- An outbound train at the station in May 2011

General information
- Location: Beacon Street at Saint Mary's Street; Brookline, Massachusetts
- Coordinates: 42.34593°N 71.10746°W
- Platforms: 2 side platforms
- Tracks: 2
- Connections: MBTA bus: 47, 85

Construction
- Cycle facilities: 10 spaces
- Accessible: Yes

History
- Rebuilt: 2002

Passengers
- 2011: 1,532 daily boardings

Services
Preceding station	MBTA	Following station
Hawes Street toward Cleveland Circle	Green Line C branch	Kenmore toward Government Center
Location

Saint Mary's Street station is a light rail stop on the Green Line C branch of the MBTA subway system, located just west of the intersection of Beacon Street and Park Drive in the northeastern tip of Brookline, Massachusetts. Saint Mary's Street has two side platforms serving two tracks. The station is accessible. With just over 1,500 daily boardings by a 2011 count, Saint Mary's Street is the second-busiest surface stop on the C branch, behind only Coolidge Corner.

== History ==
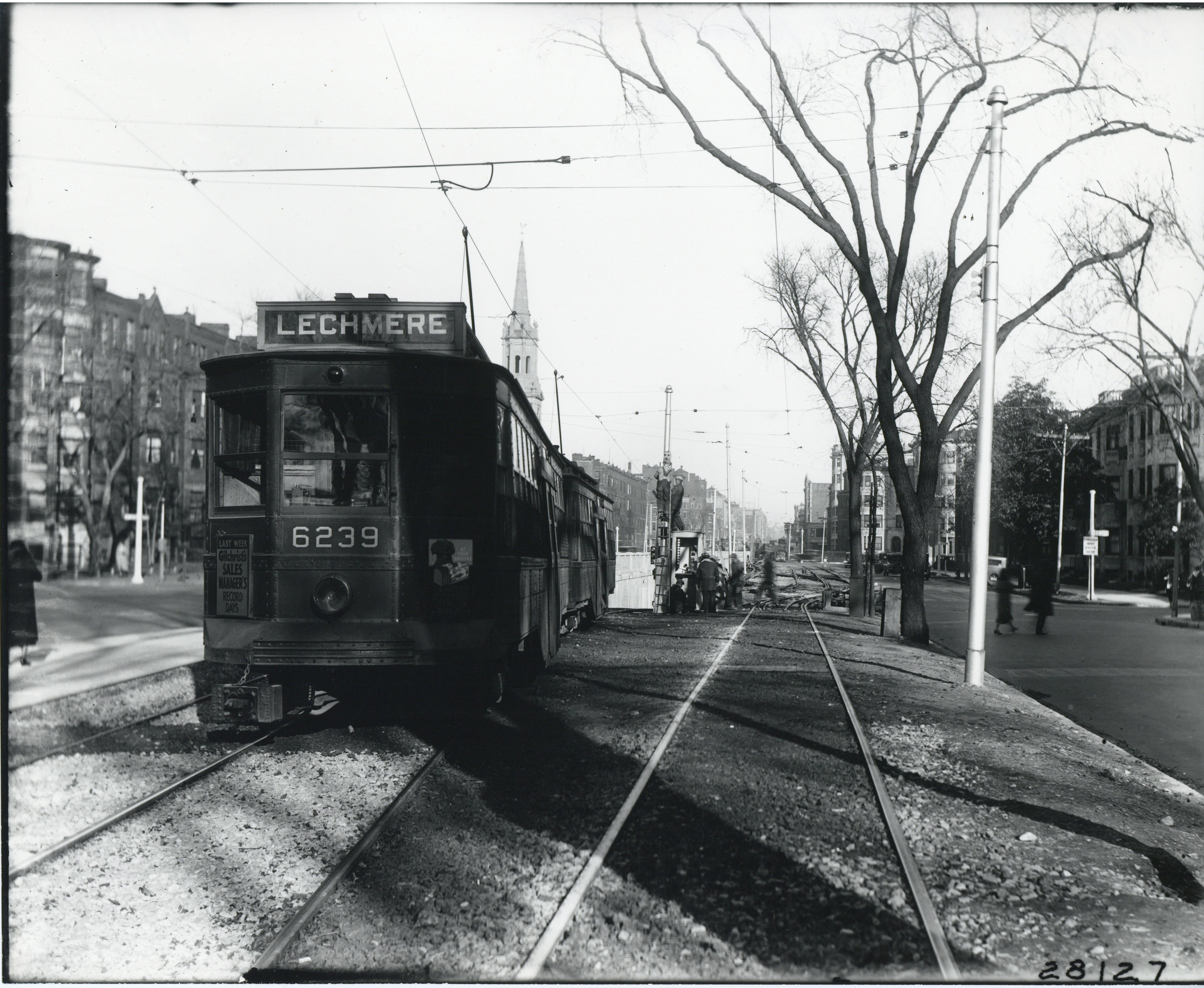
An inbound streetcar enters the newly built portal in 1932

Saint Mary's Street is the first outbound surface stop on the C branch. The line emerges from the Beacon Street tunnel at the Saint Mary's Street portal, just east of the station. Until Kenmore was built in 1932, streetcars emerged from the Kenmore portal and ran down the median of Beacon Street from Kenmore Square.

In the early 2000s, the MBTA modified key surface stops with raised platforms for accessibility. Portable lifts were installed at Saint Mary's Street around 2000 as a temporary measure. The renovation of Saint Mary's Street - part of a $32 million modification of thirteen B, C, and E branch stations - was completed in 2003.

In 2007, the MBTA added a wooden mini-high platform on the outbound side, allowing level boarding on older Type 7 LRVs. These platforms were installed at eight Green Line stations in 2006–07 as part of the settlement of Joanne Daniels-Finegold, et al. v. MBTA. The ramp was removed in July 2020 during a track reconstruction project.

In February 2024, the MBTA indicated long-term plans to possibly move the platforms slightly west, with entrances added at Carlton Street. This would allow the platforms to be straighter and the inbound platform to be wider.
