= Fairbanks Street station =

Former light rail station in Brookline, Massachusetts, US

Fairbanks Street
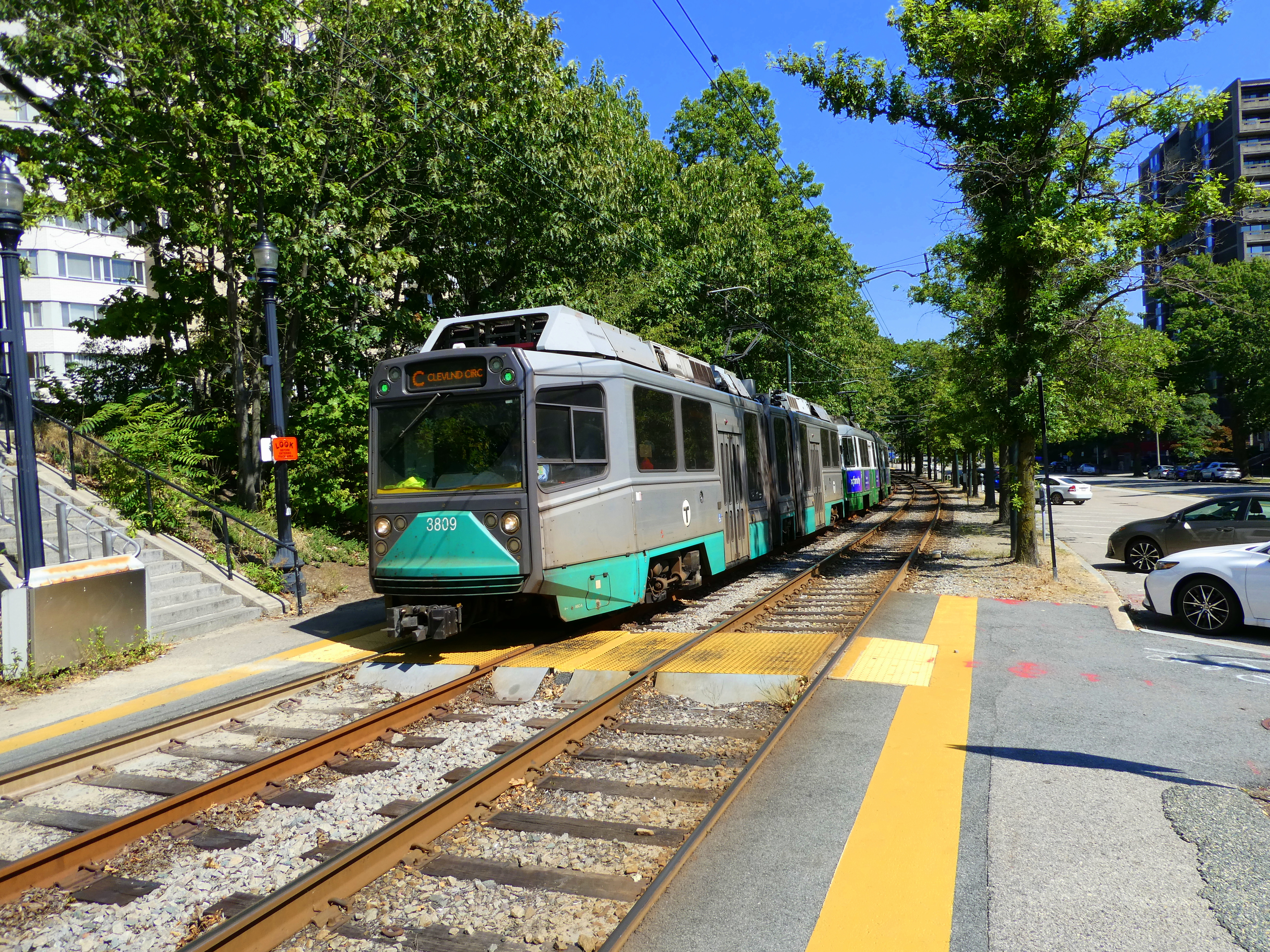
- An outbound train at Fairbanks Street station in 2024

General information
- Location: Beacon Street at Fairbanks Street; Brookline, Massachusetts
- Coordinates: 42.33967°N 71.13107°W
- Platforms: 2 side platforms
- Tracks: 2

Construction
- Accessible: No

History
- Closed: November 7, 2026

Passengers
- 2011: 444 daily boardings

Former services
Preceding station	MBTA	Following station
Washington Square toward Cleveland Circle	Green Line C branch	Brandon Hall toward Government Center
Location

Fairbanks Street station was a light rail stop on the Green Line C branch of the MBTA subway system, located in the median of Beacon Street at Fairbanks Street in Brookline, Massachusetts. The station had two side platforms serving the line's two tracks. The station closed on November 7, 2026, after renovations to nearby Brandon Hall station.

== Closure ==
Construction of a ramp adjacent to the station in 2026

Track work in 2018–19, which included replacement of platform edges at several stops, triggered requirements for accessibility modifications at those stops. Design work for Fairbanks Street and seven other C Branch stations was 15% complete by December 2022. Designs shown in February 2024 called for Fairbanks Street and Brandon Hall stations to be consolidated into a single station between their present locations. Accessible ramps to the north side of Beacon Street would be built at Lancaster Terrace and Mason Path. In May 2024, the Federal Transit Administration awarded the MBTA $67 million to construct accessible platforms at 14 B and C branch stops including the combined station.

The MBTA awarded a $41.9 million design-build contract in April 2025. Designs shown in February 2026 called for the platforms for the combined station to be at the existing Brandon Hall site. By March 2026, work at Fairbanks Street and Brandon Hall was expected to take place from May to December 2026. The station permanently closed on November 7, 2026, and was demolished during a closure of the C Branch lasting until November 15. Shuttle buses served the station during the shutdown.
