= Kenmore station =

Subway station in Boston, Massachusetts, US

Kenmore
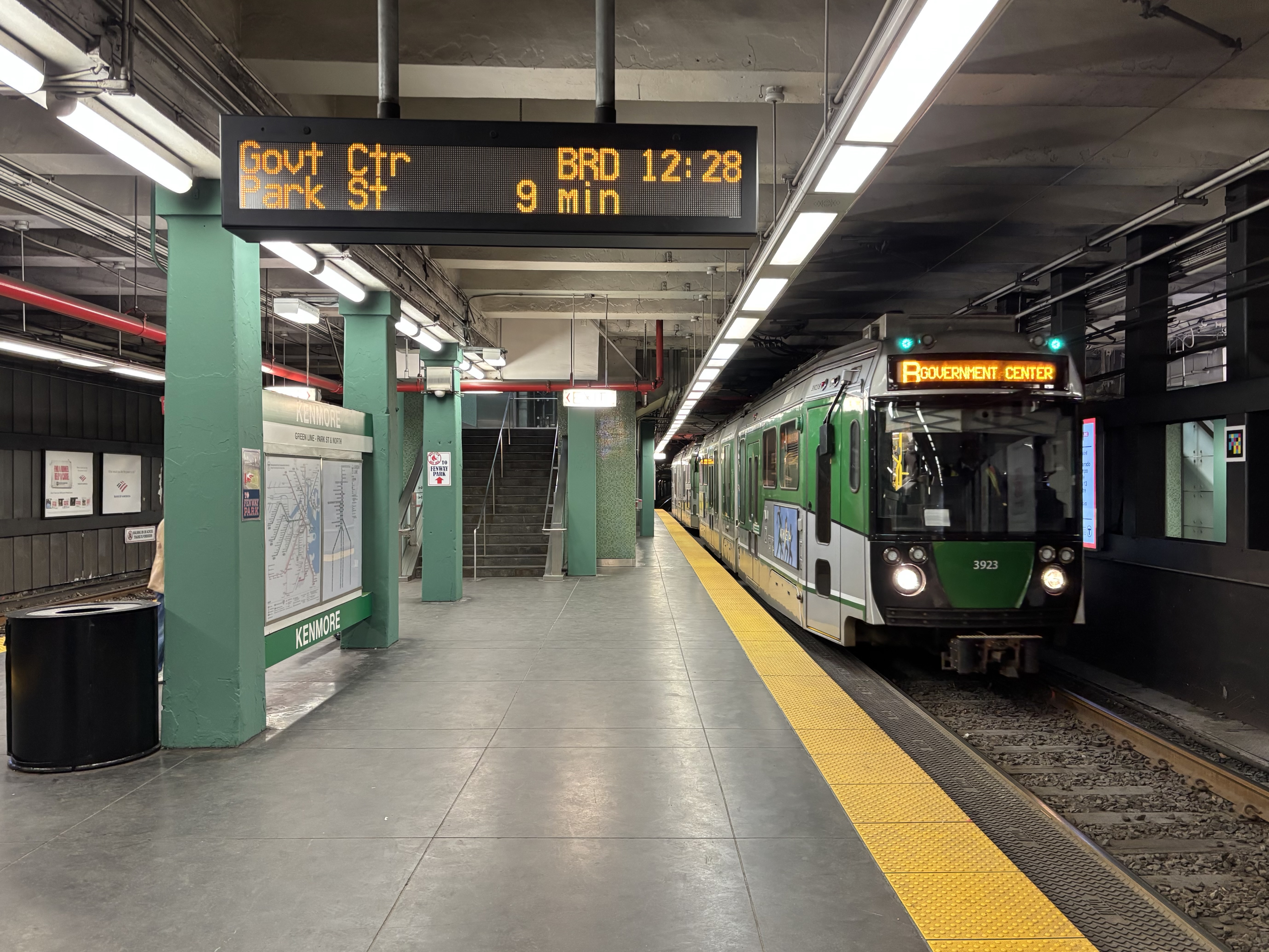
- An inbound train at Kenmore station in April 2025

General information
- Location: Commonwealth Avenue at Kenmore Square; Boston, Massachusetts
- Coordinates: 42°20′56.13″N 71°5′44.19″W
- Line: Boylston Street subway
- Platforms: 2 island platforms
- Tracks: 4
- Connections: MBTA bus: 8, 19, 57, 60

Construction
- Structure type: Underground
- Cycle facilities: 8 spaces
- Accessible: yes

History
- Opened: October 23, 1932
- Rebuilt: 2005–2010

Passengers
- FY2019: 7,655 (weekday average boardings)

Services
Preceding station	MBTA	Following station
Blandford Street toward Boston College	Green Line B branch	Hynes Convention Center toward Government Center
Saint Mary's Street toward Cleveland Circle	Green Line C branch	Hynes Convention Center toward Government Center
Fenway toward Riverside	Green Line D branch	Hynes Convention Center toward Union Square
Former services
Preceding station	MBTA	Following station
Blandford Street toward Watertown	Green Line A branch Discontinued 1969	Auditorium toward Park Street
Location

Kenmore station is an underground light rail station on the MBTA Green Line, located under Kenmore Square in the Fenway/Kenmore neighborhood of Boston, Massachusetts, United States. It is served by the B, C, and D branches of the Green Line. The station has two island platforms, one for each direction. Kenmore is the primary station for Fenway Park, which is 1,000 feet (300 m) to the south. The station opened on October 23, 1932 as a one-station extension of the Boylston Street subway to relieve congestion in the square. It was renovated for accessibility in 2005–2010.

== Station layout ==
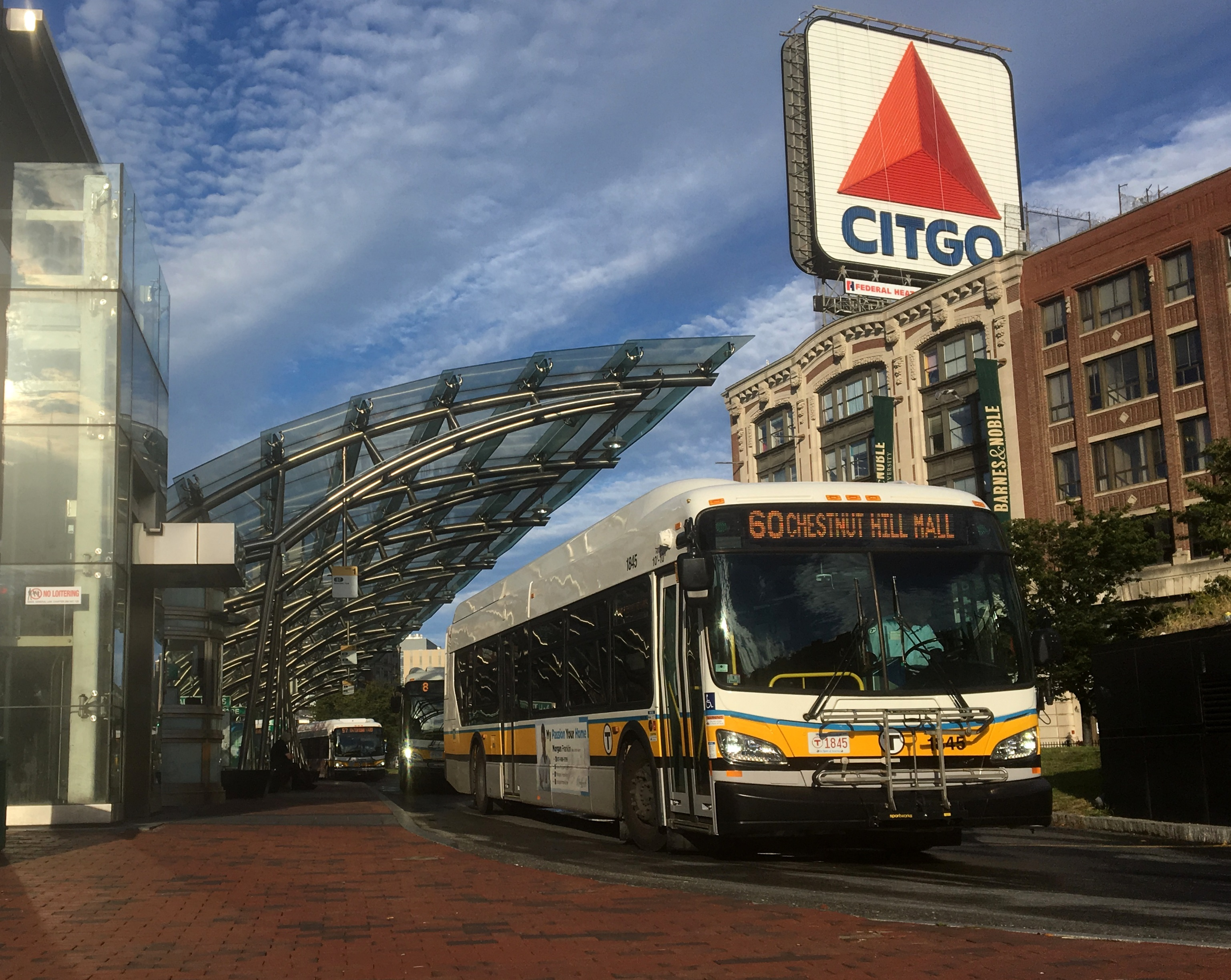
A route 60 bus at Kenmore in 2018

Kenmore station has four tracks serving two island platforms; the northern platform serves outbound passengers on all lines, while the southern platform serves all inbound trains. The B branch uses the inner tracks, while the C and D branches use the outer tracks. West of the station, the B branch crosses the C/D branches at a flying junction. The C and D branches split at a flat junction (Beacon Junction) further to the southwest. The Kenmore Loop connects the outer tracks, allowing inbound C and D trains to reverse direction without entering the main subway. Not normally used for revenue service, the loop is used occasionally during service disruptions.

The fare mezzanine is located over the middle of the platforms, with stairs and escalators from the platforms. Passageways lead to the exits on the north and south sides of Kenmore Square. An escalator and stairs lead to the busway, which is in the middle of the square. One elevator connects the south sidewalk to the fare mezzanine level, another connects the fare lobby to the outbound platform, and a third connects the busway to the inbound platform via the fare lobby.

As the last station in the subway before it splits into surface lines, Kenmore is the terminal for MBTA bus routes 8, 19, 57, and 60. During track work and service disruptions on the three branch lines, substitute bus service is often provided from Kenmore.

== History ==
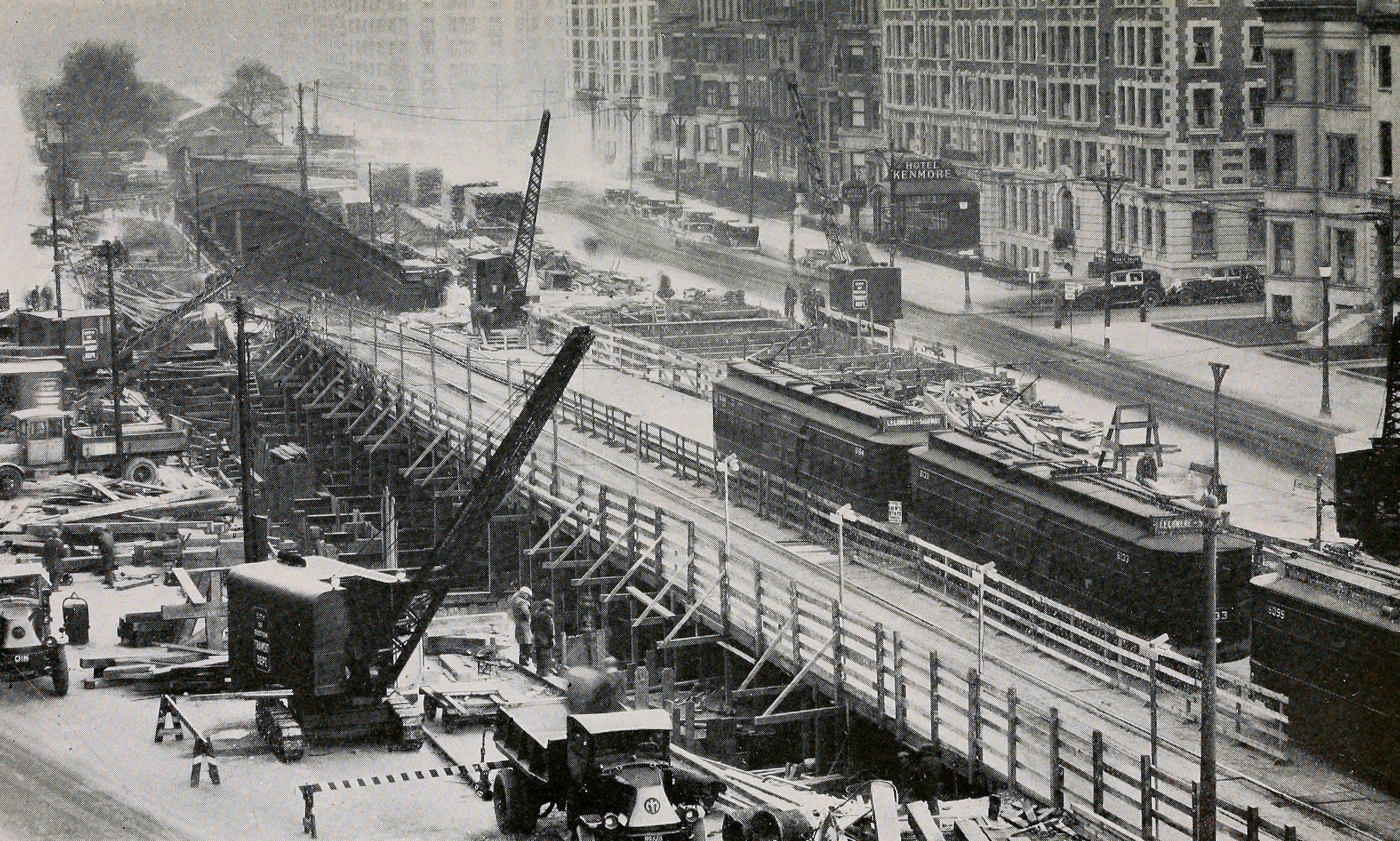
Kenmore station under construction in 1930

On January 2, 1923, some off-peak trips of the Lechmere–Pleasant Street shuttle were extended through the Boylston Street Subway to the surface station at Kenmore; all-day service began on October 10. Most trips were extended along the Beacon Street line to Washington Square on December 14, 1929. The Washington Street service was cut back to Kenmore in June 1930 but resumed that September. On February 7, 1931, Commonwealth Avenue and Beacon Street service was extended from Park Street to Lechmere, and the existing shuttle services to Lechmere were replaced with Kenmore–Park Street shuttles.

The subway station opened on October 23, 1932, replacing the former Kenmore Incline – whose portal archway can still be seen east of Kenmore Square – and the surface station. The Commonwealth Avenue and Beacon Street services – now the B and C branches – were routed through the station from its opening day. The Kenmore cutback was replaced with a pocket track at Blandford Street.

The Commonwealth Avenue line was planned to be eventually converted to use high-platform metro stock (like the other subway lines), and was to move into a tunnel under Commonwealth Avenue, while the Beacon Street line was to use the short turn loop rather than continuing into the Boylston Street subway. Streetcar passengers would make a cross-platform transfer to subway trains, similar to the then-recently-opened Ashmont station. The streetcar tracks were placed on a wooden structure in the station and at the surface incline pending the future tunnel extension. Over the years, it became clear that the Commonwealth Avenue line was unlikely to be converted to heavy rail service. In the 1980s, the wooden structure was removed and the cavity was filled with dirt and concrete.

Bus service to Kenmore began in 1933 as replacement for the Ipswich Street line. Buses originally stopped at the curb, which required them to cut across multiple lanes of traffic to loop from inbound to outbound. In early 1939, the Chamber of Commerce proposed a busway in the center of the square, with direct access to the station mezzanine below. Mayor Maurice J. Tobin initially supported the plan, but soon refused to allow the city to pay for it. The proposal was raised again in 1943, and Tobin awarded a $24,063 contract on June 28. The busway, which had a concrete platform and a wooden shelter, opened along with a direct stairway to the mezzanine on November 4, 1943.

=== MBTA era ===
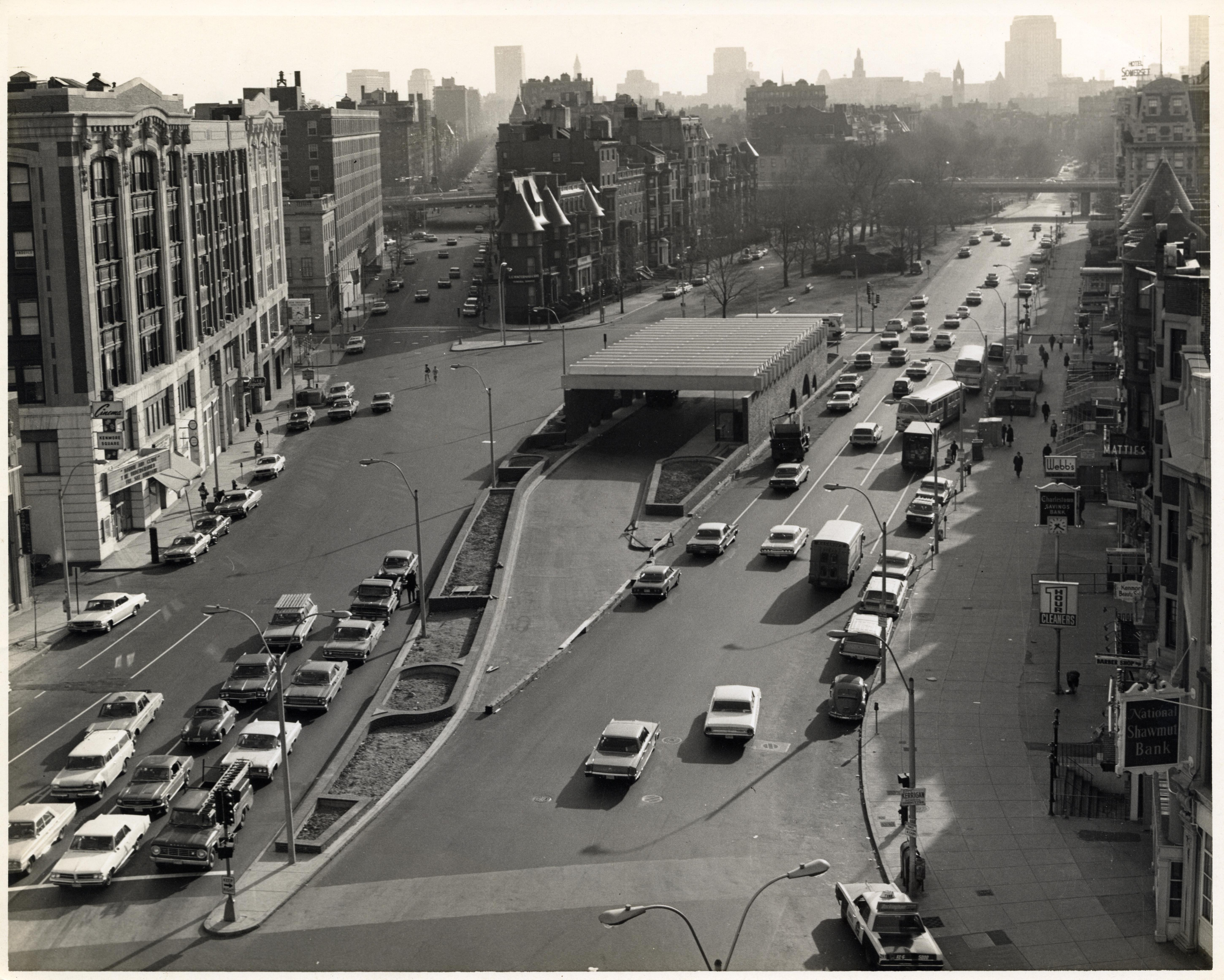
The new busway shelter in 1968

Service on the Highland branch (now the D branch) began on July 4, 1959. Until its shutdown in 1969, the A branch to Watertown Yard shared the B-branch tracks, running along Commonwealth Avenue to Packard's Corner, where it branched off onto Brighton Avenue. A $314,300 reconstruction of the busway and $342,000 in station modernization work began in 1967. The new busway shelter had red brick walls with a fluted concrete-and-plastic canopy; an escalator from mezzanine to busway was added. The busway work was finished in April 1968, with the modernization completed in 1970. The work included the addition of abstract murals depicting neighborhood scenes on the station signs.

The station was closed for two months in 1996, after the Muddy River overflowed its banks, completely submerging the platform and some of the mezzanine. During the closure, substitute service was provided by commuter rail trains between Riverside and South Station. A similar flood previously occurred on October 6, 1962, requiring closure of the station for five days. In 2019, the MBTA installed steel doors at the Fenway portal to prevent future flooding.

=== Renovation ===
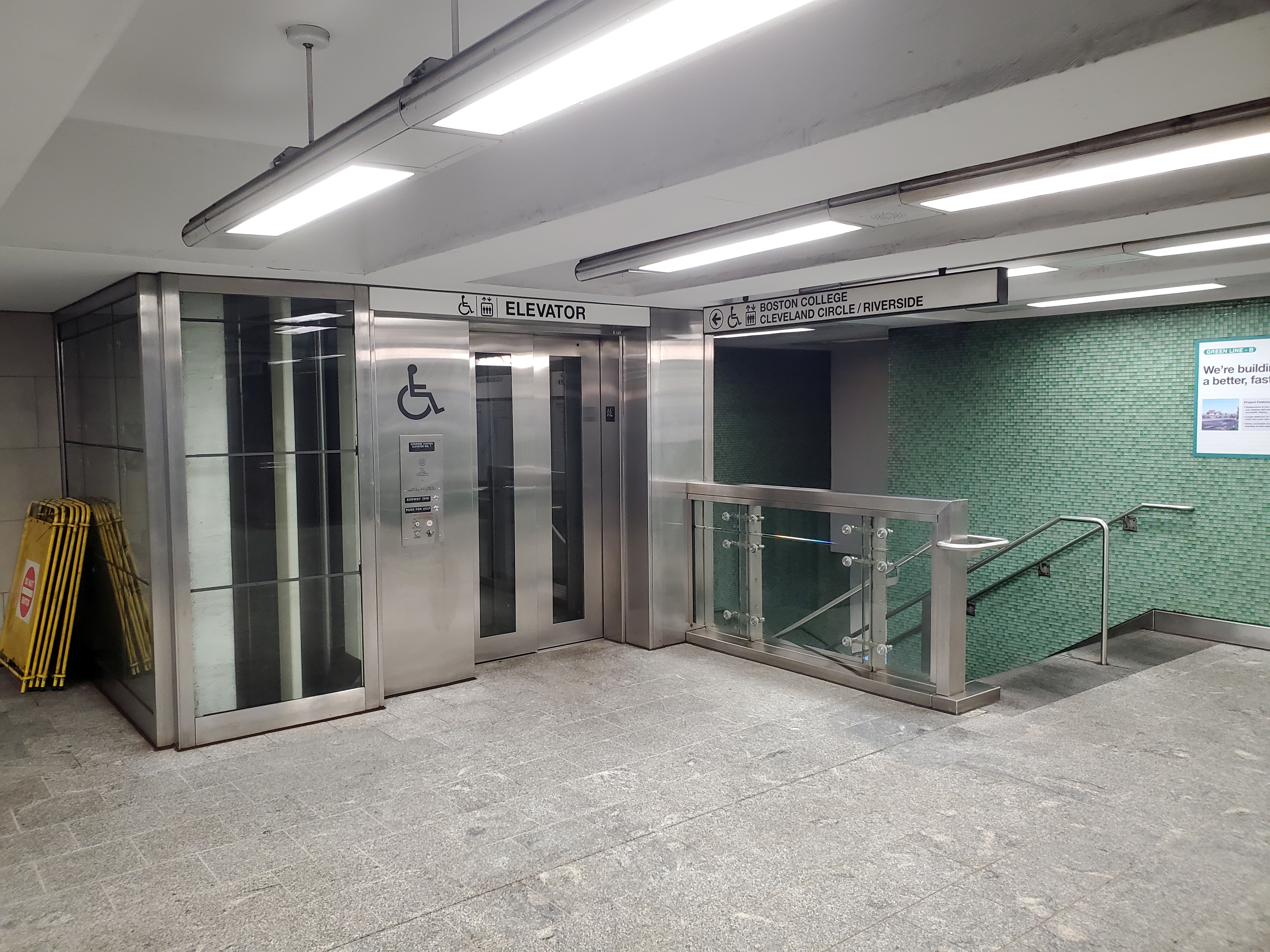
The elevator to the outbound platform, one of three installed during the 2005-2010 renovation

The MBTA began its Light Rail Accessibility Program in 1996. Design for renovations to make Kenmore accessible began in May 1996, with construction then expected to last from 2002 to 2004. Preliminary designs for a conical glass-covered busway shelter to replace the old rectangular shelter were released in 2001. Separately, the south entrance to the station was moved inside the Boston University-funded Hotel Commonwealth during its 2002-03 construction. A $22.7 million construction contract was ultimately issued on November 10, 2004, with construction starting in January 2005. Temporary bus stops on Beacon Street were used during construction.

Work included construction of the busway shelter, raising the platforms, and addition of three elevators and three escalators. The project also involved streetscape improvements with trees and brick sidewalks, intended to make Kenmore Square resemble Beacon Hill and the Back Bay as a break from its rough reputation.

The work was originally to be completed in early 2007, but delays mounted. A lawsuit settled by the MBTA in 2006 required changes to how accessibility renovations were designed. Previously undocumented utilities delayed excavation, and keeping the station open during construction presented difficulties. Two sets of stairs had to be kept open during the baseball season, which was prolonged when the Red Sox went to the playoffs in 2005, 2006, 2008, and 2009. The metal frame of the shelter was erected in 2006, but the fasteners for the glass had to be redesigned, delaying progress by several months. By November 2007, the project was projected to be completed in late 2008 – almost two years late – with the cost increased to $32 million.

The station ultimately became accessible in January 2010. The total cost was $50.6 million; the original base contract had increased from $22.7 million to $40.7 million, almost entirely because of change orders for which the MBTA was at fault. Art panels featuring Red Sox players on station signs were unveiled at a ribbon-cutting ceremony on April 22, 2010.
