= Summit Avenue station =

Summit Avenue station could refer to:

- Journal Square Transportation Center in Jersey City, New Jersey, United States
- Summit Avenue station (MBTA Green Line B branch), a closed light rail stop in Boston, Massachusetts, United States
- Summit Avenue station (MBTA Green Line C branch), a light rail stop in Brookline, Massachusetts, United States
