= Kent Street station =

Light rail station in Brookline, Massachusetts, US

Kent Street
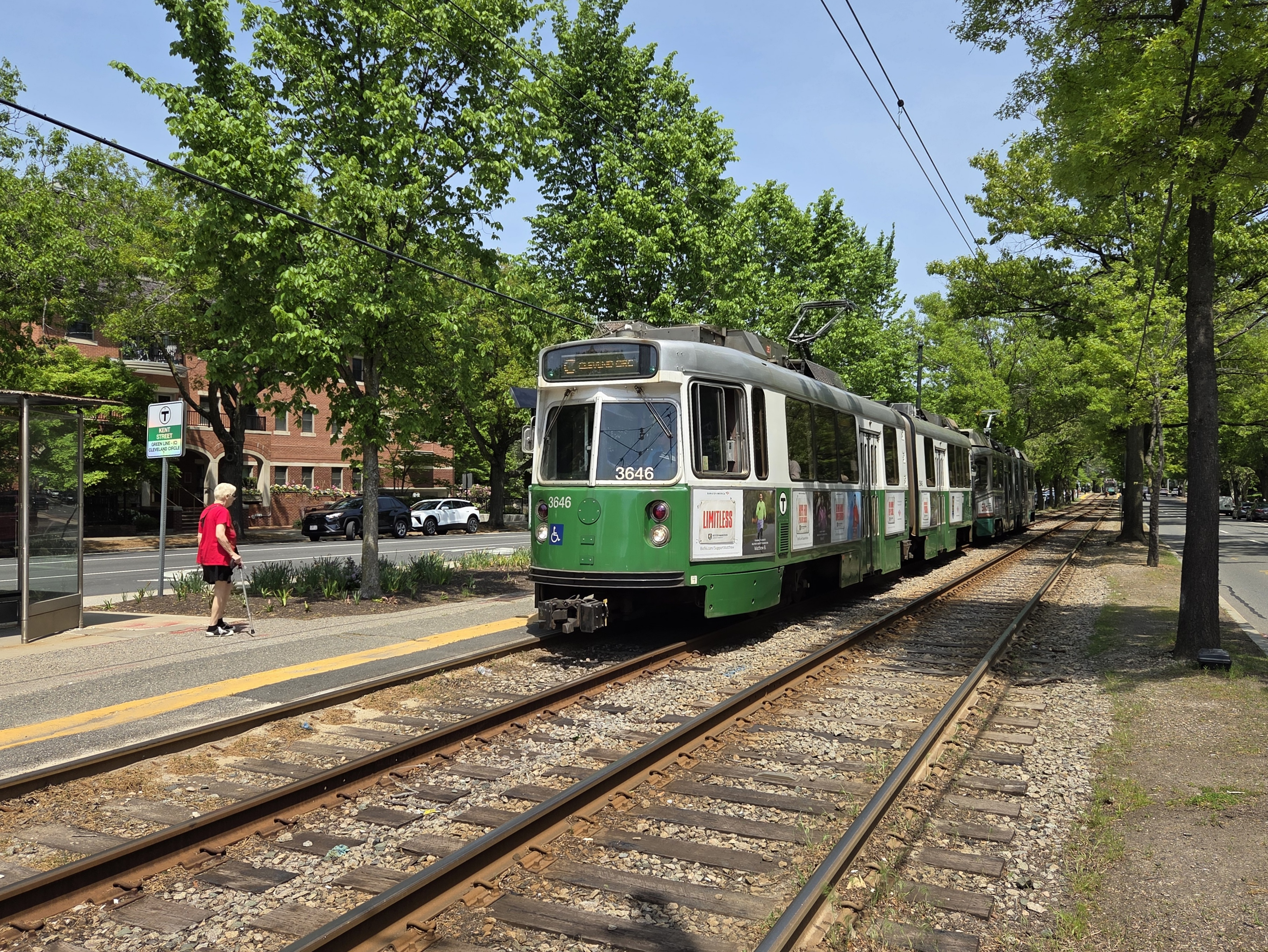
- An outbound train at Kent Street in 2026

General information
- Location: Beacon Street at Kent Street; Brookline, Massachusetts
- Coordinates: 42.34403°N 71.11432°W
- Platforms: 2 staggered side platforms
- Tracks: 2

Construction
- Accessible: No

History
- Closed: 2026 (planned)

Passengers
- 2011: 386 daily boardings

Services
Preceding station	MBTA	Following station
Saint Paul Street toward Cleveland Circle	Green Line C branch	Hawes Street toward Government Center
Location

Kent Street station is a light rail stop on the Green Line C branch of the MBTA subway system, located in the median of Beacon Street in Brookline, Massachusetts. The two side platforms are staggered on opposite sides of the Kent Street / Powell Street grade crossing; the outbound platform is to the east and the inbound platform to the west. Kent Street is not accessible. The MBTA plans to close Kent Street in 2026 as part of renovations to nearby Saint Paul Street and Hawes Street stations.

== Planned closure ==
Track work in 2018–19, which included replacement of platform edges at several stops, triggered requirements for accessibility modifications at those stops. Design work for Kent Street and seven other C Branch stations was 15% complete by December 2022. Plans shown in February 2024 called for Kent Street station to be closed, as it is just 830 feet (250 m) from both Saint Paul Street and Hawes Street stations. In May 2024, the Federal Transit Administration awarded the MBTA $67 million for the platform projects. The MBTA awarded a $41.9 million design-build contract in April 2025. As of March 2026, the station is planned to close during 2026; the platforms will be removed in December 2026.
