= Hawes Street station =

Light rail station in Brookline, Massachusetts, US

Hawes Street
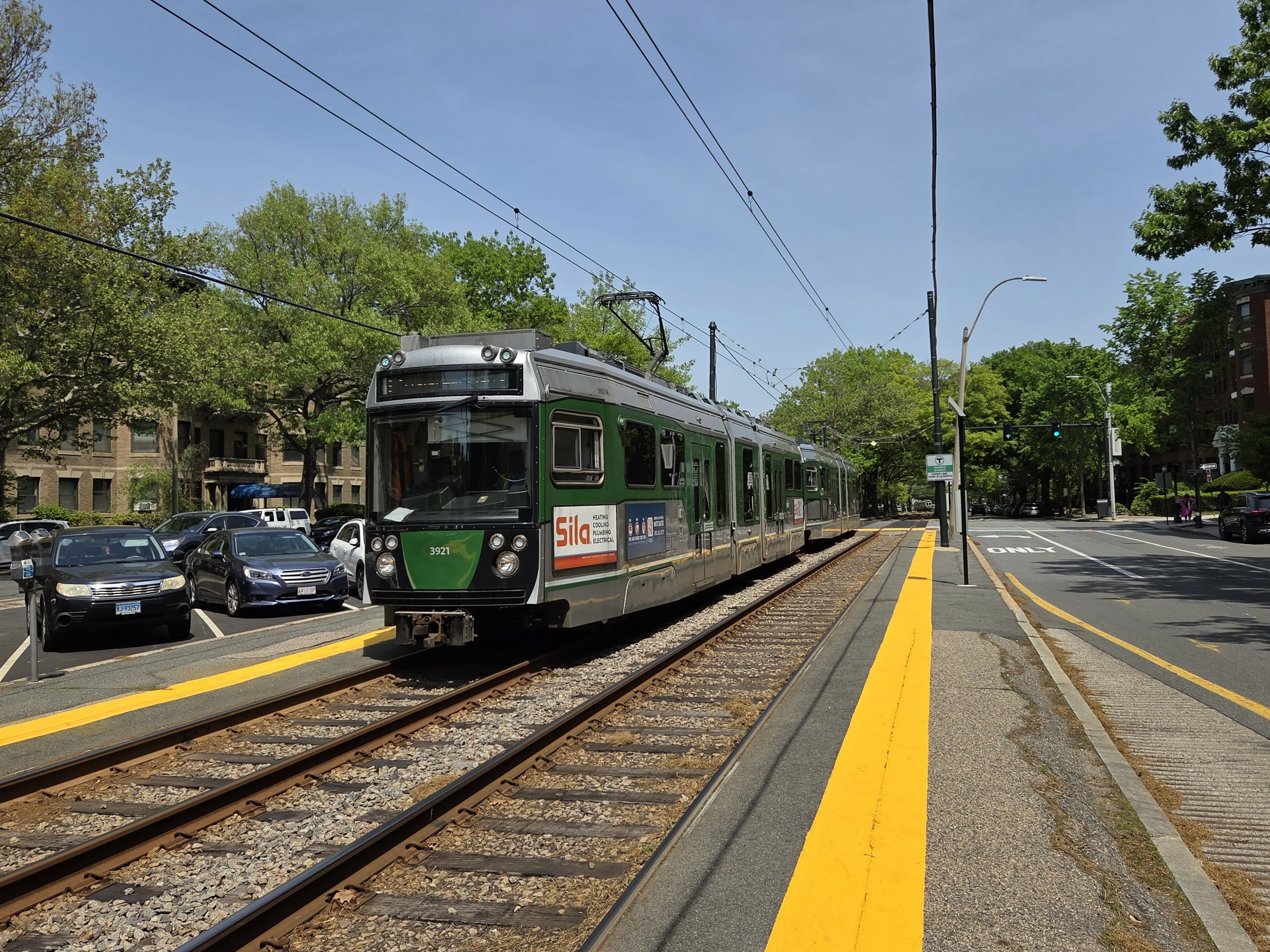
- An outbound train at Hawes Street in 2026

General information
- Location: Beacon Street at Hawes Street; Brookline, Massachusetts
- Coordinates: 42.34481°N 71.11144°W
- Platforms: 2 side platforms
- Tracks: 2

Construction
- Accessible: No

History
- Rebuilt: 2026

Passengers
- 2011: 339 daily boardings

Services
Preceding station	MBTA	Following station
Kent Street toward Cleveland Circle	Green Line C branch	Saint Mary's Street toward Government Center
Location

Hawes Street station is a light rail stop on the Green Line C branch of the MBTA subway system, located in the median of Beacon Street west of Hawes Street in Brookline, Massachusetts. The station has two side platforms which serve the C branch's two tracks. With 339 boardings on an average weekday in 2011, Hawes Street had the lowest ridership on the C branch and fourth-lowest on the entire Green Line. Hawes Street is not accessible; a reconstruction for accessibility is taking place in 2026.

== Reconstruction ==
Reconstruction work in October 2026

Track work in 2018–19, which included replacement of platform edges at several stops, triggered requirements for accessibility modifications at those stops. Design work for Hawes Street and seven other C Branch stations was 15% complete by December 2022. Designs shown in February 2024 called for the inbound platform at Hawes Street to be shifted to the east side of the intersection. In May 2024, the Federal Transit Administration awarded the MBTA $67 million to construct accessible platforms at 14 B and C branch stops including Hawes Street.

The MBTA awarded a $41.9 million design-build contract in April 2025. Designs shown in February 2026 called for the platforms at Hawes Street to be widened and rebuilt in their current locations. By March 2026, preliminary construction work was expected to take place in May and August 2026, followed by main construction from October to December 2026. Platform construction began during a shutdown of the C branch from August 8–16, 2026.

The outbound platform was closed for reconstruction from October 19 to November 7, 2026, followed by a shutdown of the C Branch from November 7 to 15. The inbound platform was demolished during the shutdown and will remain closed for reconstruction until December 10, 2026. The rebuilt platforms will be 8 inches (200 mm) high for compatibility with the folding doors of existing rolling stock. They will be raised to 14 inches (360 mm) for level boarding once Type 10 LRVs replace existing Green Line vehicles.
