= Saint Paul Street station =

Light rail station in Brookline, Massachusetts, US

Saint Paul Street
- Saint Paul Street station in November 2026 during reconstruction

General information
- Location: Beacon Street at Saint Paul Street; Brookline, Massachusetts
- Coordinates: 42.34323°N 71.11717°W
- Platforms: 2 side platforms
- Tracks: 2

Construction
- Accessible: No

History
- Rebuilt: 2026

Passengers
- 2011: 849 daily boardings

Services
Preceding station	MBTA	Following station
Coolidge Corner toward Cleveland Circle	Green Line C branch	Kent Street toward Government Center
Location

Saint Paul Street station is a light rail stop on the Green Line C branch of the MBTA subway system, located in the median of Beacon Street at Saint Paul Street in Brookline, Massachusetts. The station has two staggered side platforms, serving the C branch's two tracks; the inbound platform is to the west of the intersection, and the outbound platform to the east. Saint Paul Street is not accessible; a reconstruction for accessibility is taking place in 2026.

== Reconstruction ==
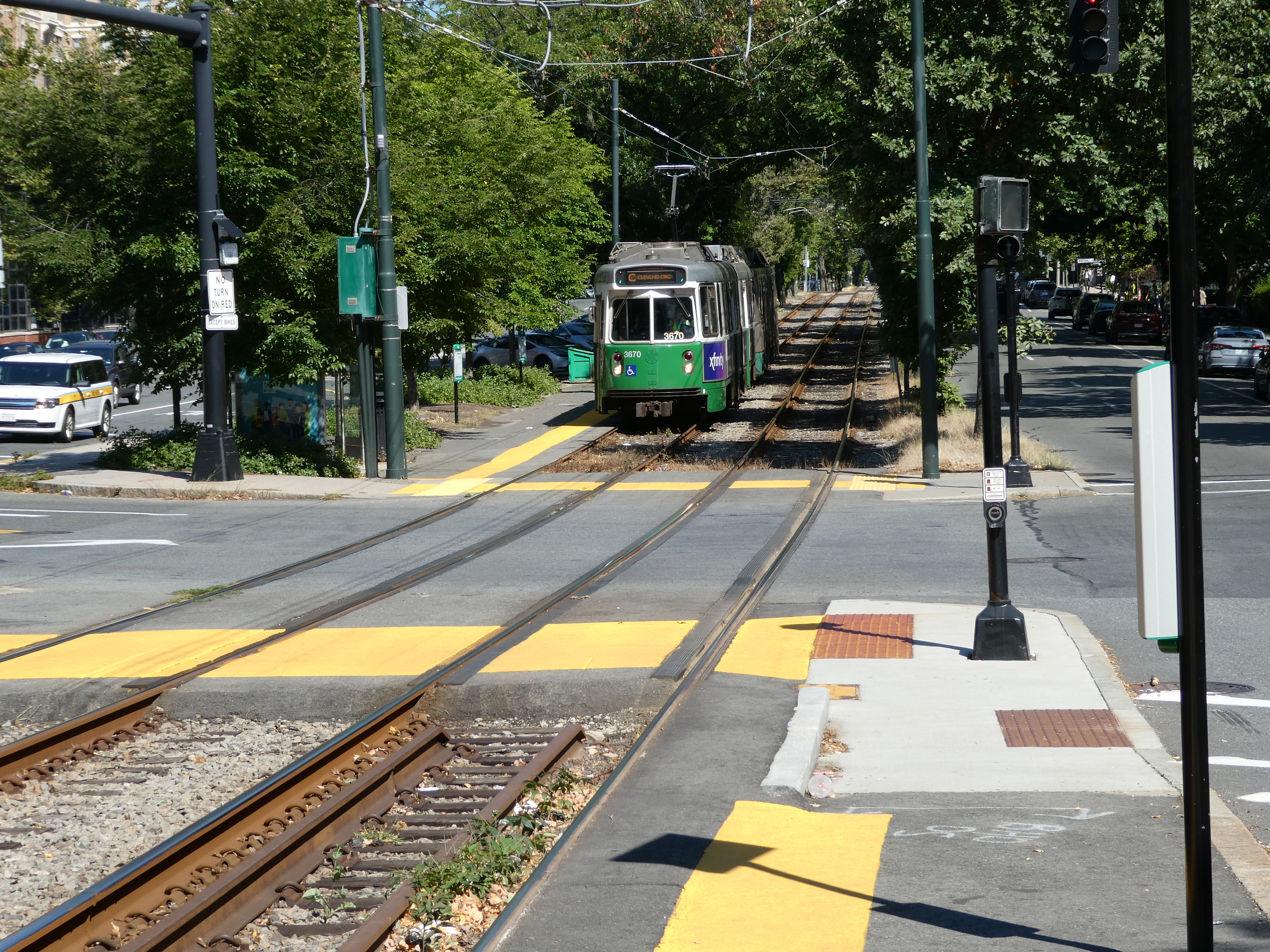
Saint Paul Street station in 2024, prior to reconstruction

Track work in 2018–19, which included replacement of platform edges at several stops, triggered requirements for accessibility modifications at those stops. Design work for Saint Paul Street and seven other C Branch stations was 15% complete by December 2022. Designs shown in February 2024 called for both platforms at Saint Paul Street to be shifted to the far side of the intersection. In May 2024, the Federal Transit Administration awarded the MBTA $67 million to construct accessible platforms at 14 B and C branch stops including Saint Paul Street.

The MBTA awarded a $41.9 million design-build contract in April 2025. Designs shown in February 2026 called for only the inbound platform to be moved to the far side of the intersection; the outbound platform would remain on the near side. By March 2026, preliminary construction work was expected to take place in May and August 2026, followed by main construction from October to December 2026. Platform construction began during a shutdown of the C branch from August 8–16, 2026. The outbound platform was closed from October 19 to November 7, 2026, for reconstruction. The concrete pours for the platforms were completed during a closure of the C Branch from November 7 to 15.

The new platforms will be 8 inches (200 mm) high for compatibility with the folding doors of existing rolling stock. They will be raised to 14 inches (360 mm) for level boarding once Type 10 LRVs replace existing Green Line vehicles.
