= Brandon Hall station =

Light rail station in Brookline, Massachusetts, US

Brandon Hall
- An outbound train at Brandon Hall station in 2026

General information
- Location: 1481 Beacon Street; Brookline, Massachusetts
- Coordinates: 42.34007°N 71.12866°W
- Platforms: 2 side platforms
- Tracks: 2

Construction
- Accessible: Yes

History
- Rebuilt: August–December 2026

Passengers
- 2011: 356 daily boardings

Services
Preceding station	MBTA	Following station
Washington Square toward Cleveland Circle	Green Line C branch	Summit Avenue toward Government Center
Location

Brandon Hall station is a light rail stop on the Green Line C branch of the MBTA subway system, located in the median of Beacon Street in Brookline, Massachusetts. Brandon Hall station has two side platforms serving the line's two tracks. With 356 daily passengers by a 2011 count, Brandon Hall was the second-least-used stop on the C branch after Hawes Street. Brandon Hall is accessible following reconstruction in 2026.

== History ==
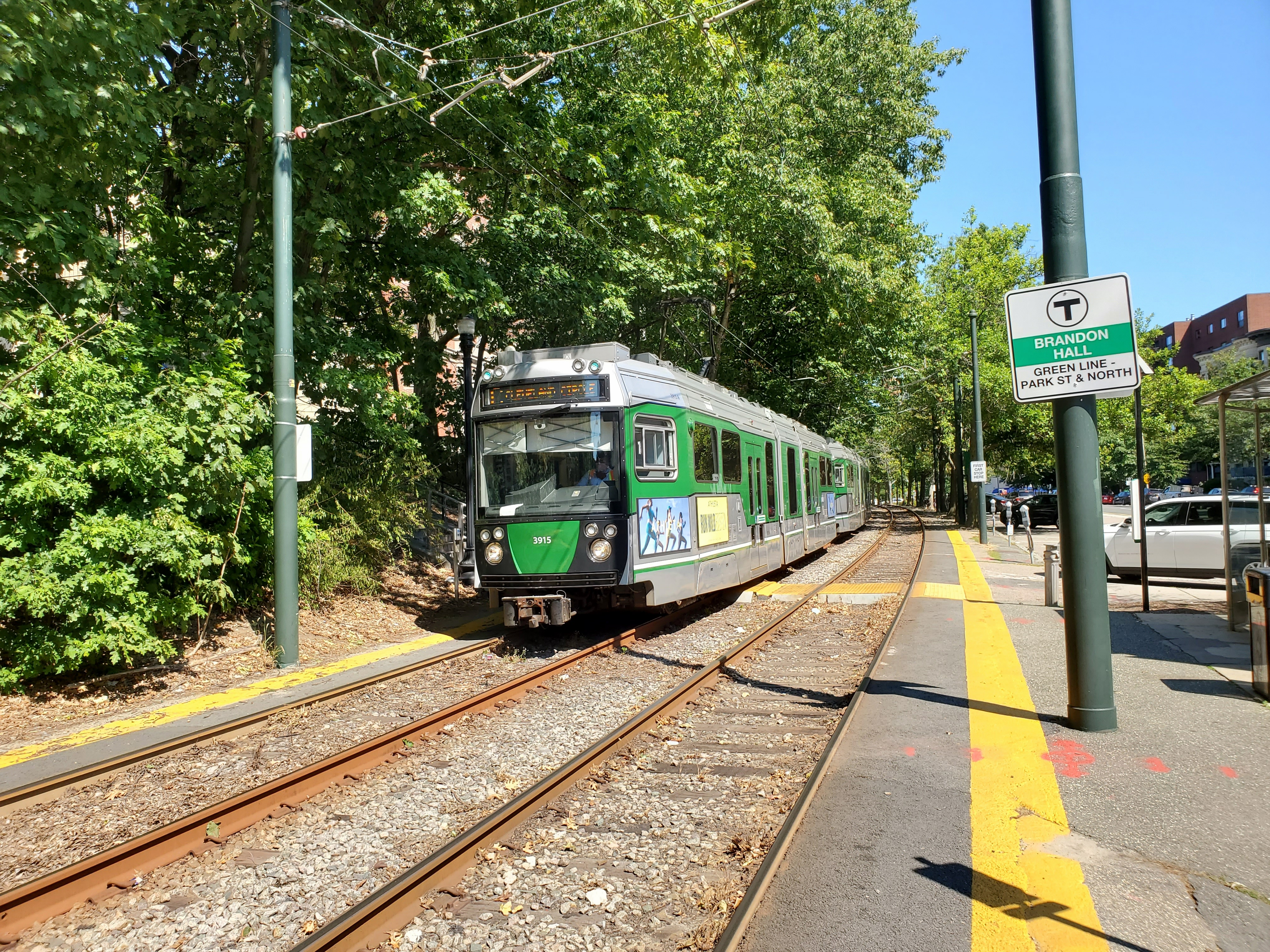
Brandon Hall station in 2024 prior to reconstruction

The station retains the name of Brandon Hall, a large hotel built in 1903 just south of the station. The hotel was destroyed by fire on April 26, 1946, after housing 400 SPARS during World War II.

Track work in 2018–19, which included replacement of platform edges at several stops, triggered requirements for accessibility modifications at those stops. Design work for Brandon Hall and seven other C Branch stations was 15% complete by December 2022. Designs shown in February 2024 called for Fairbanks Street and Brandon Hall stations to be consolidated into a single station between their present locations. Accessible ramps to the north side of Beacon Street would be built at Lancaster Terrace and Mason Path. In May 2024, the Federal Transit Administration awarded the MBTA $67 million to construct accessible platforms at 14 B and C branch stops including the combined station.

The MBTA awarded a $41.9 million design-build contract in April 2025. Designs shown in February 2026 called for the platforms at Brandon Hall to be widened and rebuilt at their existing locations. By March 2026, preliminary construction work was expected to take place in May 2026, followed by main construction from August to December 2026. Following a closure of the entire C Branch from August 8-16, 2026, the station was closed until October 30, 2026 for reconstruction. Steel for the ramps was installed during a closure of the C Branch on November 7–15, 2026. The station was accessible following that closure.

The new platforms are 8 inches (200 mm) high for compatibility with the folding doors of existing rolling stock. They will be raised to 14 inches (360 mm) for level boarding once Type 10 LRVs replace existing Green Line vehicles.
