= St. Paul station =

St. Paul Station may refer to several transport stops:

== France ==
- Saint-Paul station (Paris Metro)

== United Kingdom ==
- St Paul's tube station on the London Underground
- St Pauls railway station (Halifax) (closed 1960)
- St Paul's tram stop, Birmingham
- Walsall St Pauls bus station, West Midlands
- City Thameslink railway station on the Thameslink core route in London, formerly known as St. Paul's Thameslink.

== United States ==
- St. Paul station (DART) in Dallas, Texas
- Saint Paul Street station in Brookline, Massachusetts
- Saint Paul Street station (MBTA Green Line B branch) in Boston, Massachusetts
- Saint Paul Union Depot in Saint Paul, Minnesota
