= Summit Avenue station (MBTA Green Line C branch) =

Light rail station in Brookline, Massachusetts, US

Summit Avenue
- Summit Avenue station in September 2026 during reconstruction work

General information
- Location: Beacon Street at Summit Avenue; Brookline, Massachusetts
- Coordinates: 42.34106°N 71.12573°W
- Platforms: 2 side platforms
- Tracks: 2

Construction
- Accessible: No

History
- Rebuilt: 2026
- Former names: Winchester Street

Passengers
- 2011: 945 daily boardings

Services
Preceding station	MBTA	Following station
Brandon Hall toward Cleveland Circle	Green Line C branch	Coolidge Corner toward Government Center
Location

Summit Avenue station is a light rail stop on the Green Line C branch of the MBTA subway system, located in the median of Beacon Street between Winchester Street and Summit Avenue in the Coolidge Corner neighborhood of Brookline, Massachusetts. The stop has two low side platforms that serve the line's two tracks. Summit Avenue is not accessible; a reconstruction for accessibility is taking place in 2026.

== History ==
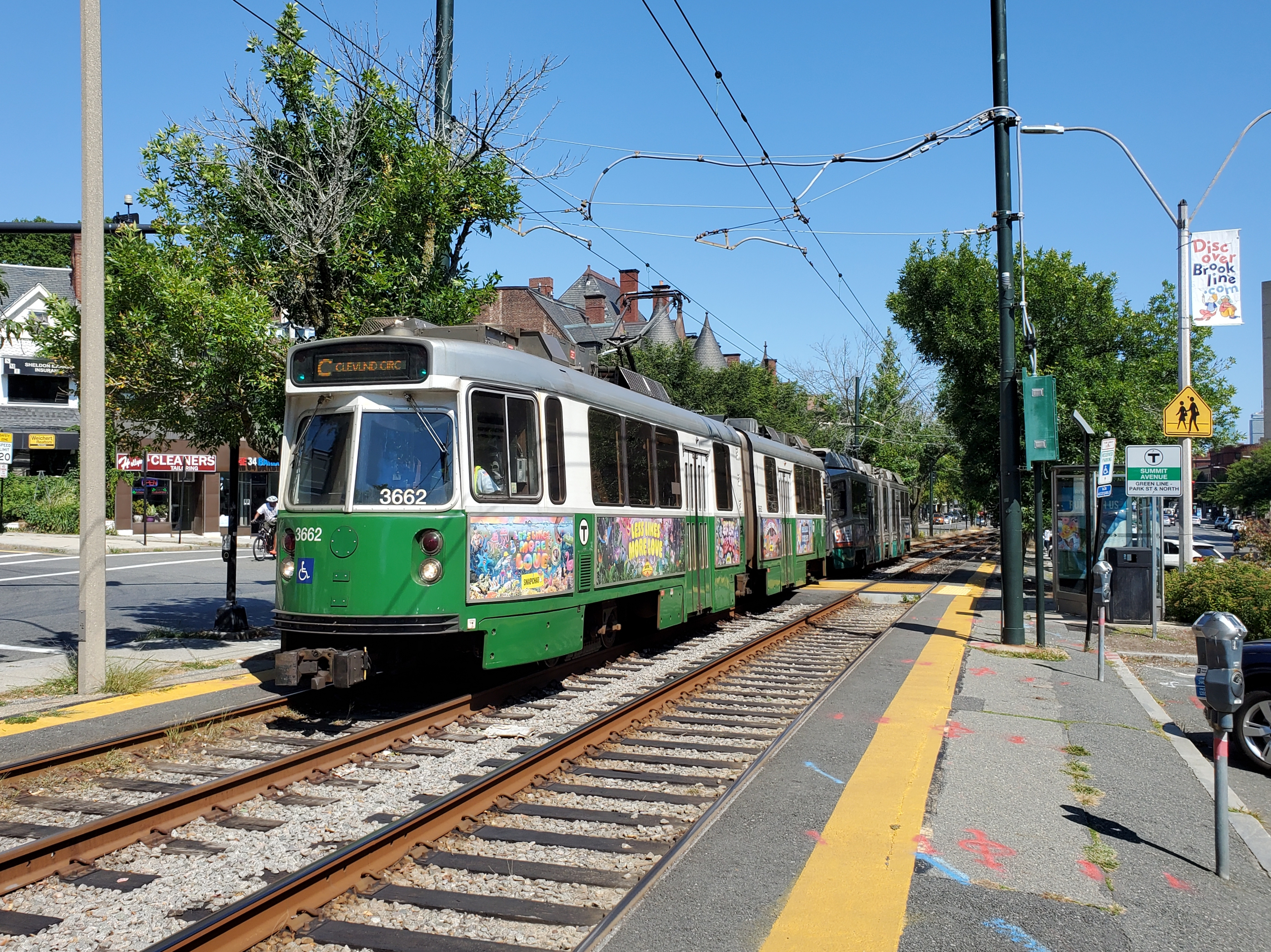
Summit Avenue station in 2024, prior to reconstruction

Until around 2004, the station was listed as Winchester Street to avoid confusion with Summit Avenue stop on the B branch. The B branch stop was closed as part of a pilot program in April 2004 (after which the C branch stop became Summit Avenue) and permanently closed the following March.

Track work in 2018–19, which included replacement of platform edges at several stops, triggered requirements for accessibility modifications at those stops. Design work for Summit Avenue and seven other C Branch stations was 15% complete by December 2022. Designs shown in February 2024 called for the platforms to be shifted eastward, with access from both Winchester Street and Summit Avenue. In May 2024, the Federal Transit Administration awarded the MBTA $67 million to construct accessible platforms at 14 B and C branch stops including Summit Avenue.

The MBTA awarded a $41.9 million design-build contract in April 2025. Designs shown in February 2026 called for the platforms to be shifted westward, with access from both Marion Street and Summit Avenue. By March 2026, preliminary construction work was expected to take place in April and May 2026, followed by main construction from July to September 2026. Construction began during a shutdown of the C Branch on May 6–17, 2026. The outbound platform at Summit Avenue was closed from July 20–August 7, 2026, for reconstruction, followed by a closure of the whole branch from August 8–16. The inbound platform was demolished during a closure of the entire C Branch from November 7-15, 2026. It will remain closed until December 10, 2026 for reconstruction.

The rebuilt platforms will be 8 inches (200 mm) high for compatibility with the folding doors of existing rolling stock. They will be raised to 14 inches (360 mm) for level boarding once Type 10 LRVs replace existing Green Line vehicles.
