= Coolidge Corner station =

Light rail station in Brookline, Massachusetts, US

Coolidge Corner
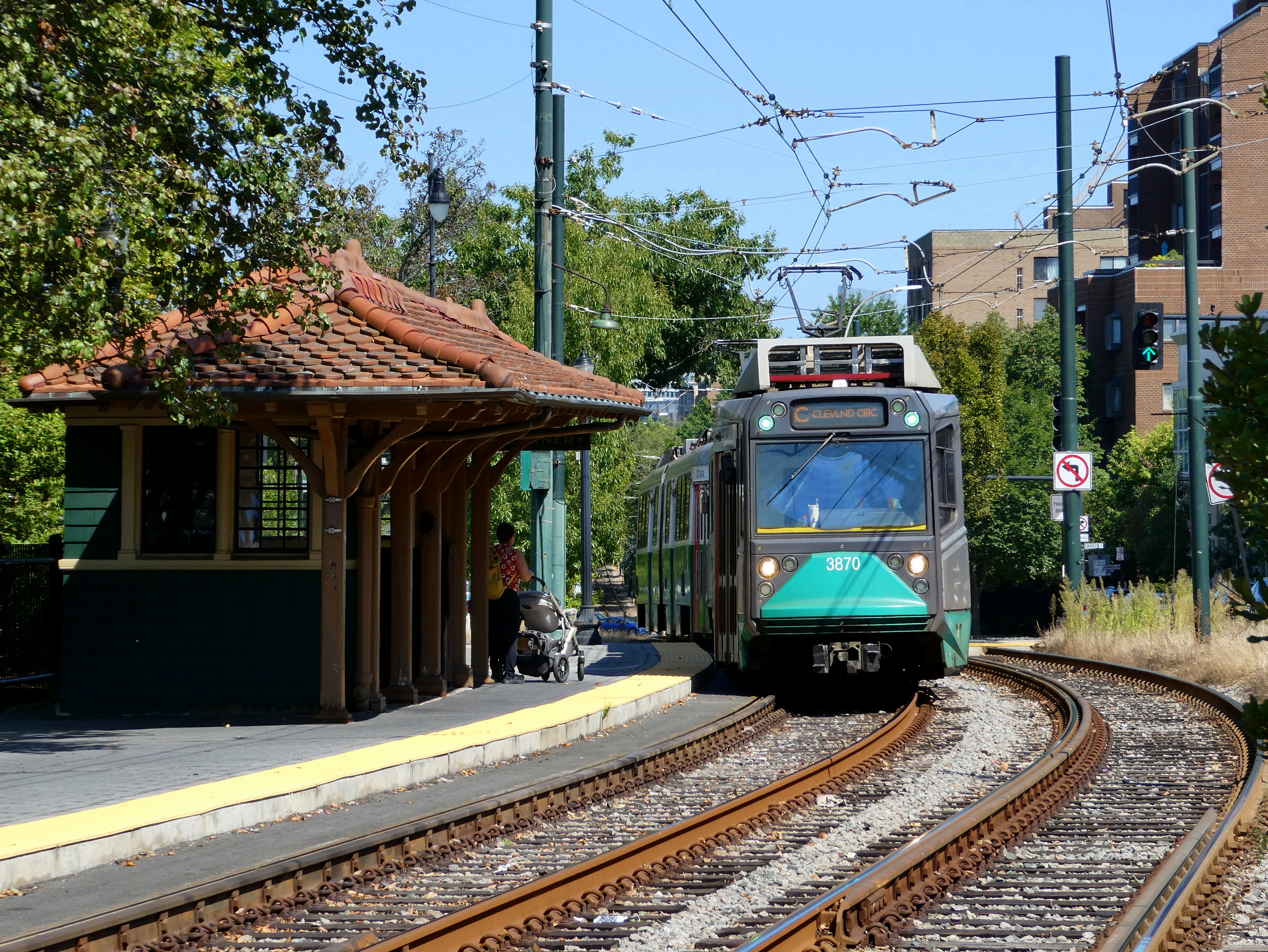
- An outbound train at Coolidge Corner in 2024

General information
- Location: Beacon Street at Harvard Street; Brookline, Massachusetts
- Coordinates: 42.3422°N 71.1213°W
- Platforms: 2 side platforms
- Tracks: 2
- Connections: MBTA bus: 66; Flixbus

Construction
- Cycle facilities: 20 spaces
- Accessible: Yes

History
- Opened: June 1, 1888
- Rebuilt: 1901; 2001

Passengers
- 2011: 3,440 daily boardings

Services
Preceding station	MBTA	Following station
Summit Avenue toward Cleveland Circle	Green Line C branch	Saint Paul Street toward Government Center
Location

Coolidge Corner station is a light rail stop on the Green Line C branch of the MBTA subway system, located at the intersection of Beacon Street and Harvard Street in the Coolidge Corner neighborhood of Brookline, Massachusetts. With 3,440 daily boardings by a 2011 count, it had more than twice the ridership of any other surface station on the branch. Coolidge Corner station is accessible, with raised platforms to accommodate low-floor light rail vehicles.

== History ==
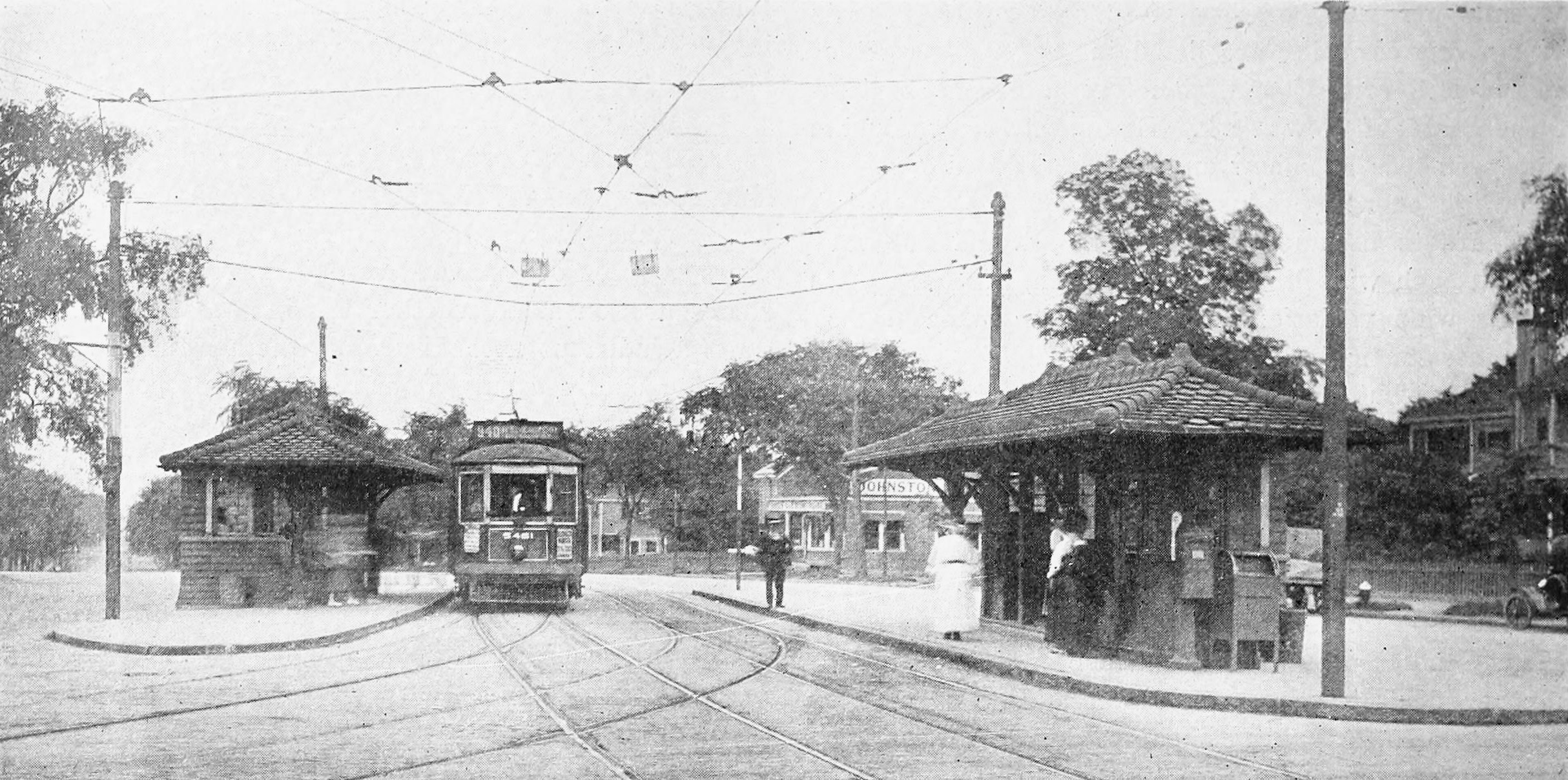
Coolidge Corner station in 1916

Horsecar service on the Beacon Street line began between Coolidge Corner and downtown Boston on June 1, 1888. Electrified service began between Allston and downtown Boston via Coolidge Corner on January 3, 1889. Service was extended west from Coolidge Corner to Reservoir on January 12, and from Allston to Oak Square the next day.

On February 3, 1900, the Boston Elevated Railway (BERy) established Coolidge Corner as a designated transfer point, where passengers could transfer between the Reservoir and Oak Square branches. The town approved the construction of shelters at the stop in November 1900, and they were completed in 1901. Each is 20 feet (6.1 m) long with a 40-foot (12 m)-long canopy, made of white pine with a tile roof. Similar shelters were built around 1912 at Brookline Village, but demolished in 1938. A 1911-built electrical substation designed by Peabody and Stearns is located in Coolidge Corner on Webster Street.

In the early 2000s, the MBTA modified key surface stops with raised platforms for accessibility. Portable lifts were installed at Coolidge Corner around 2000 as a temporary measure. The platform modifications – part of a $32 million modification of thirteen B, C, and E branch stations – were completed in 2001.

The MBTA added wooden mini-high platforms, allowing level boarding on older Type 7 LRVs, at eight Green Line stations in 2006–07 as part of the settlement of Joanne Daniels-Finegold, et al. v. MBTA. Coolidge Corner and Washington Square were originally to have one mini-high platform apiece as well; however, portable lifts were added at the stations instead.

In February 2024, the MBTA indicated long-term plans to replace the existing platforms with a longer island platform west of the Harvard Street grade crossing.
