= Washington Square station (MBTA) =

Light rail station in Brookline, Massachusetts, US

Washington Square
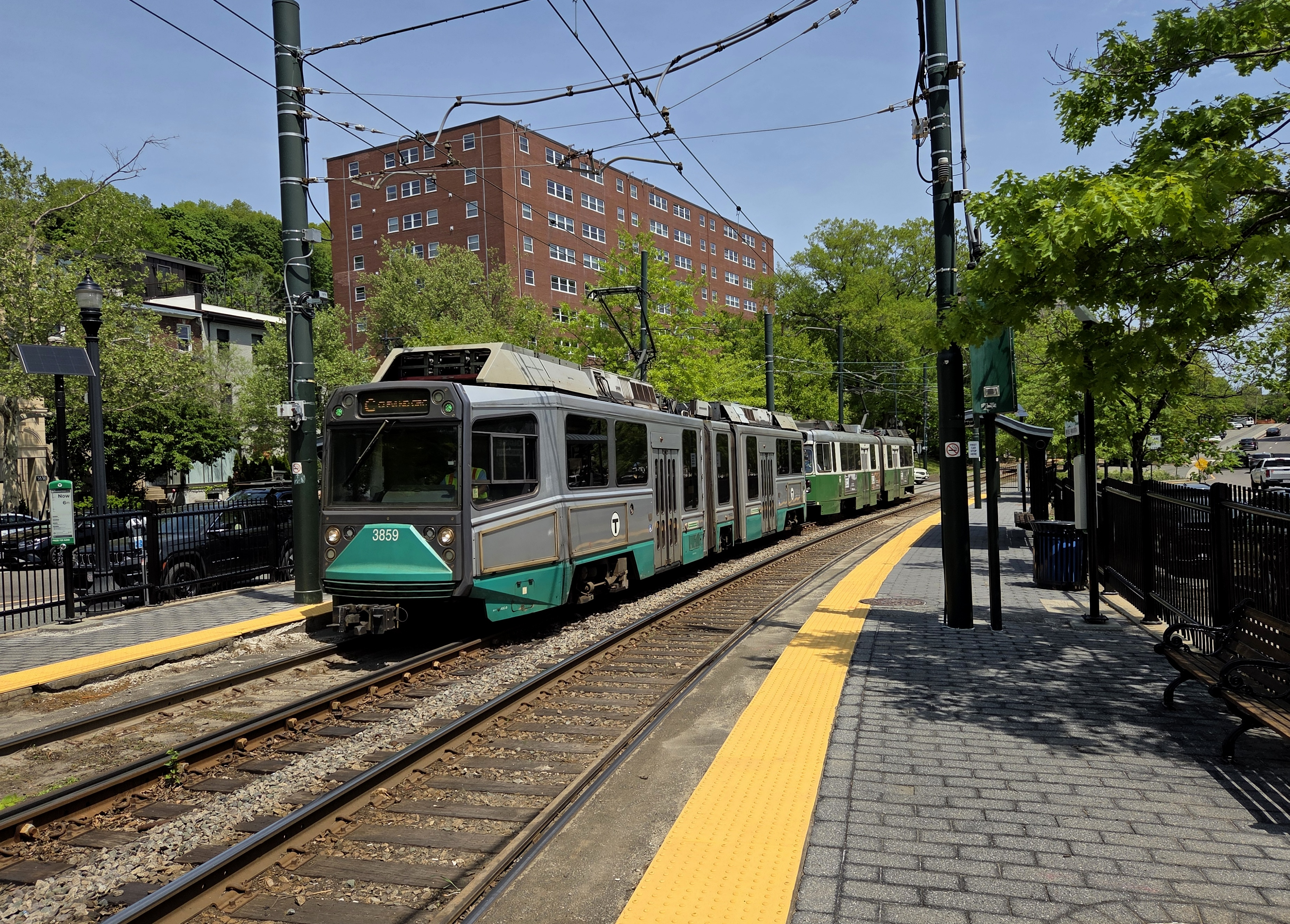
- An outbound train at the station in 2026

General information
- Location: Beacon Street at Washington Street; Brookline, Massachusetts
- Coordinates: 42.33951°N 71.13483°W
- Platforms: 2 side platforms
- Tracks: 2
- Connections: MBTA bus: 65

Construction
- Accessible: Yes

History
- Rebuilt: c. 2002

Passengers
- 2011: 1,091 daily boardings

Services
Preceding station	MBTA	Following station
Tappan Street toward Cleveland Circle	Green Line C branch	Brandon Hall toward Government Center
Location

Washington Square station is a light rail stop on the Green Line C branch of the MBTA subway system, located in the median of Beacon Street in the Washington Square neighborhood of Brookline, Massachusetts. Washington Square is the fourth-busiest surface stop on the line, with 1,091 daily boardings by a 2011 count. The station has two side platforms serving two tracks. Washington Square station is accessible, with raised platforms to accommodate low-floor light rail vehicles.

== History ==
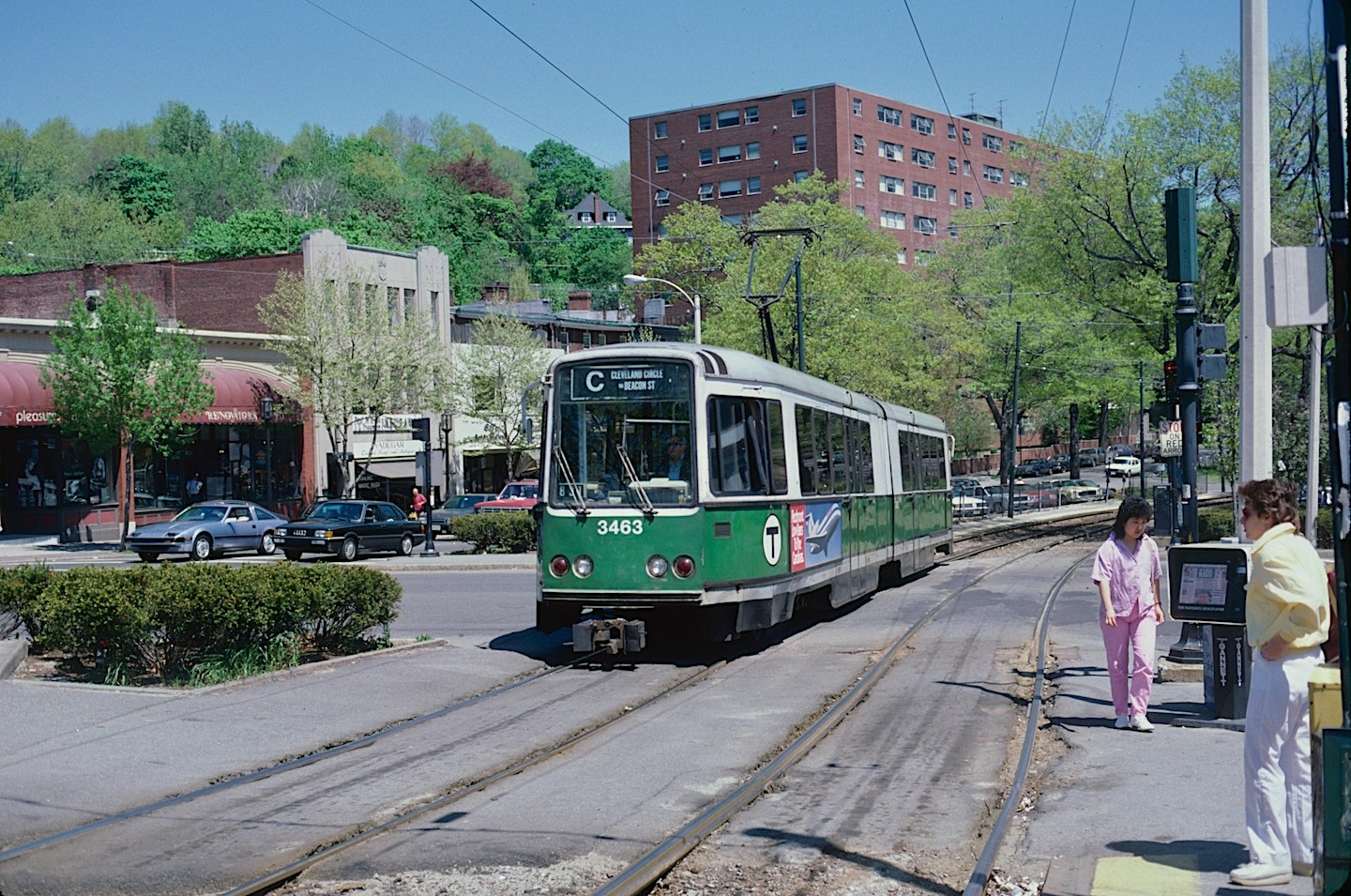
An outbound LRV at the station in 1987

In the early 2000s, the MBTA modified key surface stops with raised platforms for accessibility. The renovation of Washington Square - part of a $32 million modification of thirteen B, C, and E branch stations - was completed by 2003.

The MBTA added wooden mini-high platforms, allowing level boarding on older Type 7 LRVs, at eight Green Line stations in 2006–07 as part of the settlement of Joanne Daniels-Finegold, et al. v. MBTA. Coolidge Corner and Washington Square were originally to have one mini-high platform apiece as well; however, portable lifts were added at the stations instead.

In February 2024, the MBTA indicated long-term plans to replace the existing platforms with longer and less-curved platforms on the west side of Washington Street.
