= Coolidge Corner =

Neighborhood of Brookline, Massachusetts, US

Coolidge Corner, Brookline, Massachusetts
- Neighborhood
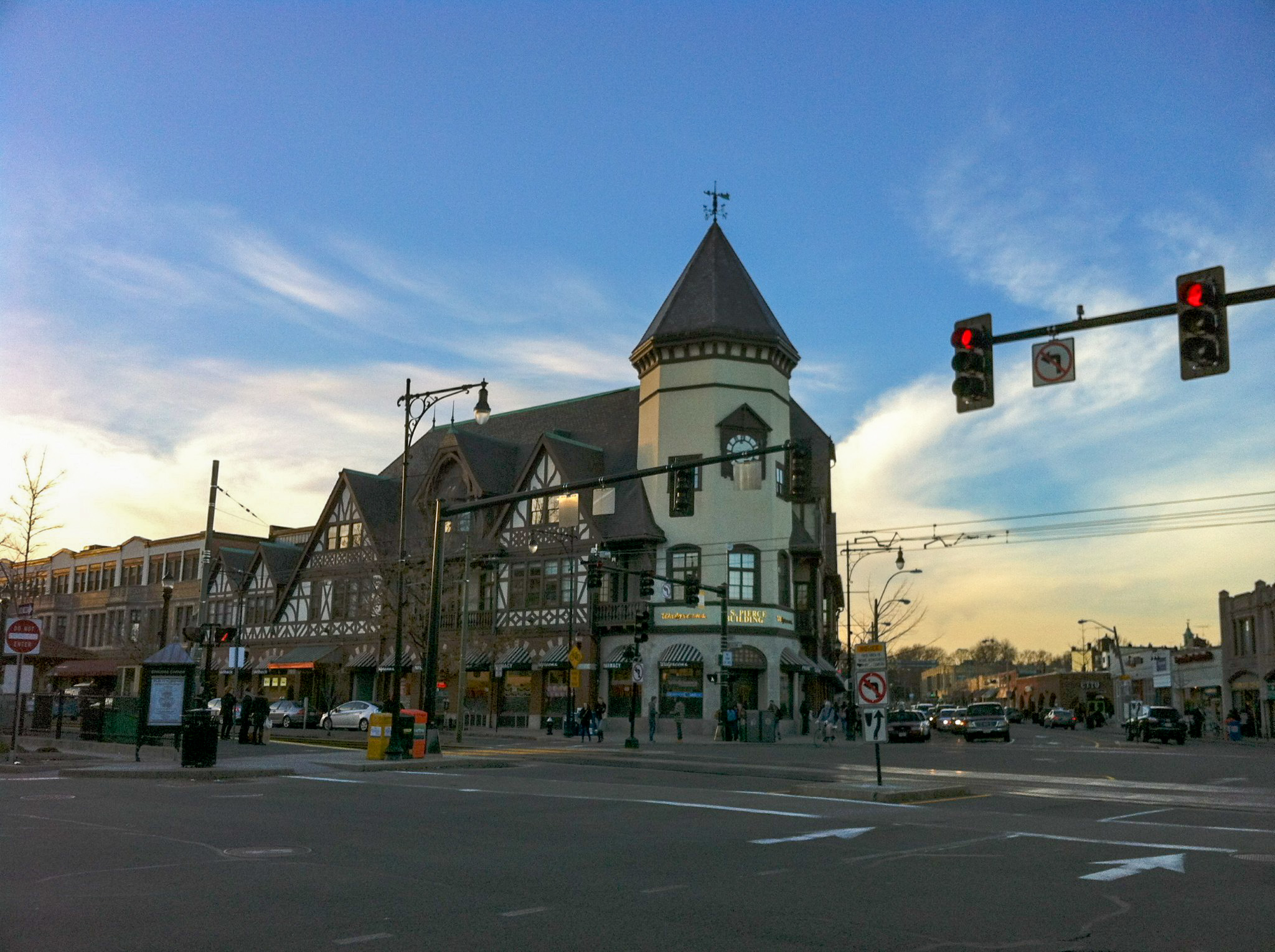
- The historic S.S. Pierce Building marks the intersection of Harvard and Beacon Streets at the center of Coolidge Corner
- Interactive map of Coolidge Corner, Brookline, Massachusetts
- Coordinates: 42.342075°N 71.121261°W
- Country: United States
- State: Massachusetts
- County: Norfolk County
- City: Brookline

Coolidge Corner is a neighborhood of Brookline, Massachusetts, United States, centered on the intersection of Beacon Street and Harvard Street. The neighborhood takes its name from the Coolidge & Brother general store that opened in 1857 at that intersection at the site of today's S.S. Pierce Building, which was for many years the only commercial business in north Brookline.

== Culture ==
Coolidge Corner developed as a transit-oriented streetcar suburb, and retains a pedestrian-friendly, walking-around feel. Many popular coffee shops, pharmacies, small independent boutiques, an independent bookstore, and independent restaurants are located there, as well as a few retail chain stores. In recent years, an influx of national bank chains has taken over several prime storefronts, detracting from the traditional neighborhood retail mix.

The neighborhood has a significant Jewish population, and there are large synagogues located on both Beacon and Harvard streets. The northern portion of Harvard Street, near the border with the Boston neighborhood of Allston, is characterized by a cluster of Jewish-oriented shops, including a bookstore, giftshop, kosher butcher, and various other stores and eateries.

More recently, Japanese restaurants, bakeries, and specialty grocery stores have appeared in the neighborhood.

== Sites ==
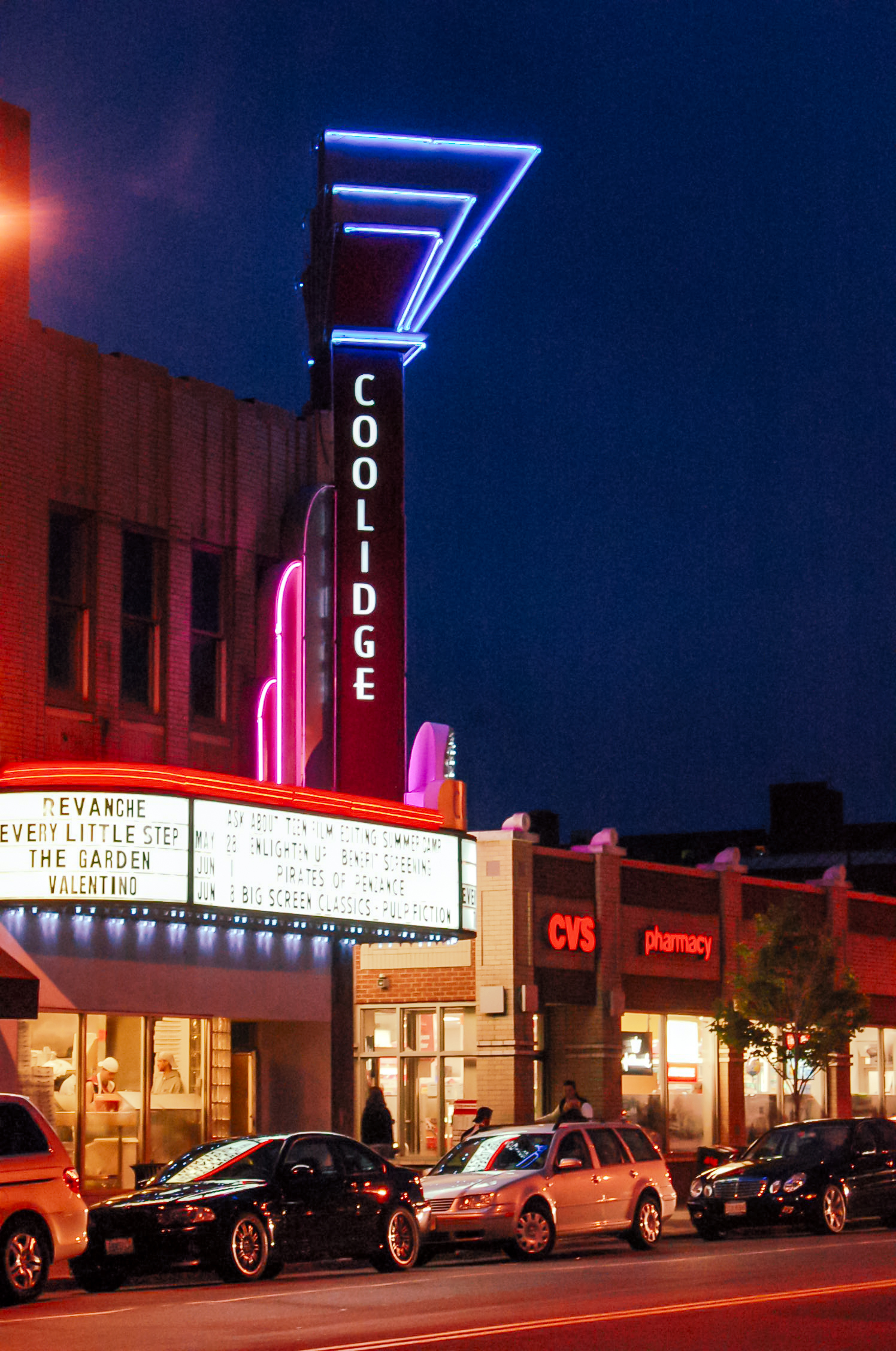
Coolidge Corner Theatre in 2009

- Coolidge Corner is home of the Coolidge Corner Theatre, a restored Art Deco movie palace that has been showing movies since 1933. It is a not-for-profit arts institution, featuring first run arthouse films, including independent films, international cinema, and documentaries. It is one of the last remaining original big screen movie houses in the country. The main theatre has a recessed theatrical stage, and seats 700 with classic elegance and cinematic style. The 2024 expansion added 2 new viewing spaces for a total of 6, increasing the total seating by about 200 seats and improving accessibility and amenities. The new lobby features indoor ticketing and combined concessions and bar areas, enhancing the visitor experience.
- Coolidge Corner contains a Trader Joe's grocery store and a number of restaurants, including (but not limited to) multiple bakeries/patisserie, a crêperie, two falafel joints, and several Asian food restaurants. There is also the Maruichi Japanese Food & Deli, a grocery store and restaurant specializing in prepared Asian food, raw ingredients, cooking equipment, and Japanese sundries. At the western end of the neighborhood, the Bazaar International Gourmet grocery specializes in Russian and Eastern European foods and ingredients.
- Coolidge Corner also hosts a popular weekly farmer's market on Thursdays from June through November.
- The S.S. Pierce Building, constructed in 1897, and originally an S.S. Pierce grocery store, is a historically significant Tudor-style building. It has accommodated a number of businesses over the years and is recognized by its large clock tower, visible from nearly all points in Coolidge Corner. (The original tower was damaged in a storm in 1944 and replaced by the current tower.)
- Near Coolidge Corner, at 83 Beals Street, is the birthplace of President John F. Kennedy. It is a National Historic Site operated by the National Park Service.

Many different events, including author readings, family game nights, and seasonal sidewalk sales and art fairs, are regularly hosted by members of the Coolidge Corner Merchants' Association.

== Public transportation ==
The Green Line C Branch of the MBTA subway network runs through Coolidge Corner on Beacon Street, with stops at Coolidge Corner and Summit Avenue. The crosstown Route 66, one of the heavily-traveled MBTA key bus routes, runs on Harvard Street and connects to the Green Line in the center of the neighborhood.

== Education ==
Coolidge Corner is home to a K-8 public elementary school, formerly known as the Coolidge Corner School, and then renamed as the Edward Devotion School. In 2018, Brookline's Town Meeting approved a warrant article to again rename the school, citing Edward Devotion's ownership of slaves. The new name was decided by a community-wide process. In November 2019, the Town Meeting voted to change the name to the Florida Ruffin Ridley School, effective in September 2020.
