= Green Line C branch =

Light rail line in Massachusetts, US

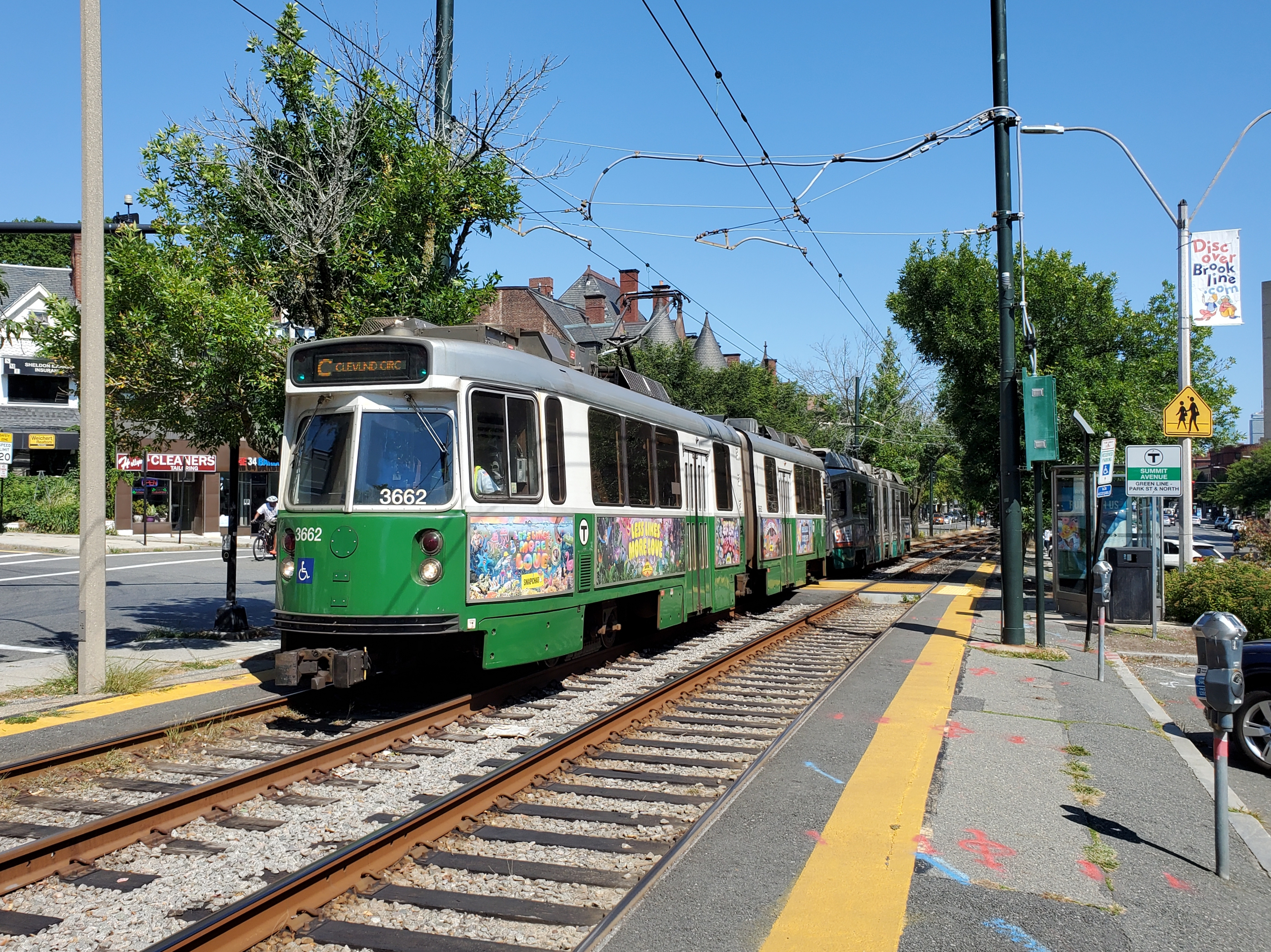
- An outbound train at Summit Avenue station in 2024

Overview
- Locale: Boston and Brookline, Massachusetts
- Termini: Government Center; Cleveland Circle
- Stations: 19

Service
- Type: Light rail
- System: Green Line (MBTA subway)
- Operator: Massachusetts Bay Transportation Authority
- Rolling stock: Kinki Sharyo Type 7 Ansaldobreda Type 8 CAF Type 9
- Daily ridership: 12,466 (2011 surface boardings)

History
- Opened: 1888

Technical
- Num of tracks: 2
- Character: Underground (east of Saint Mary's Street); Dedicated median (west of Saint Mary's Street)
- Track gauge: 4 ft 8 1/2 in (1,435 mm) standard gauge
- Electrification: Overhead line, 600 V DC

The C branch, also called the Beacon Street Line or Cleveland Circle Line, is one of four branches of the Massachusetts Bay Transportation Authority's Green Line light rail system in the Boston, Massachusetts metropolitan area. The line begins at Cleveland Circle in the Brighton neighborhood of Boston and runs on the surface through Brookline along the median of Beacon Street. Reentering Boston, the line goes underground through the Saint Mary's Street incline and joins the B and D branches at Kenmore. Trains run through the Boylston Street subway to Copley where the E branch joins, then continue through the Tremont Street subway to downtown Boston. The C branch has terminated at Government Center station since October 2021.

As of February 2023, service operates on 7 to 8-minute headways at weekday peak hours and 10 to 11-minute headways at other times, using 8 to 11 trains (16 to 22 light rail vehicles).

== History ==
=== Early history ===
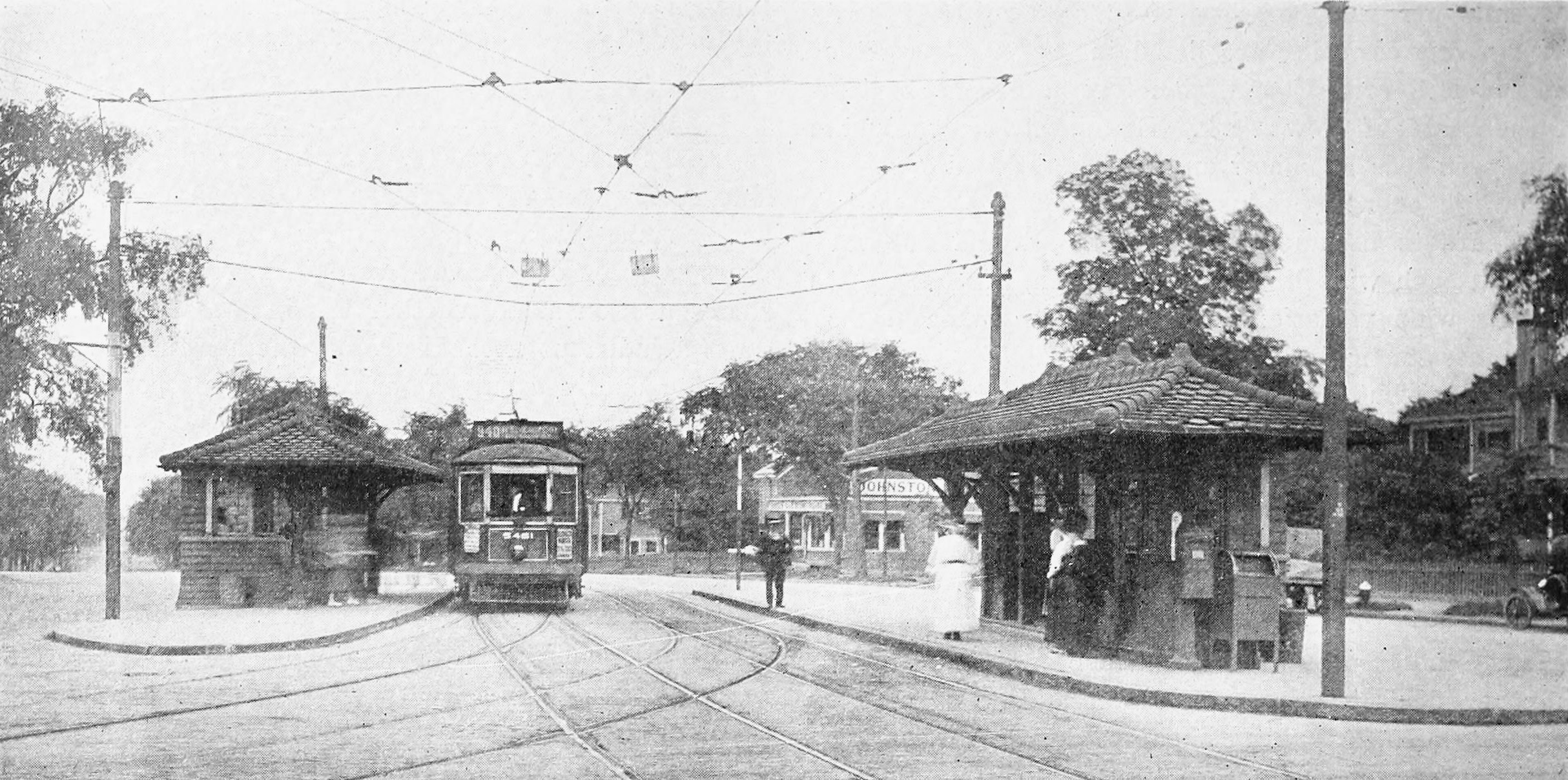
A streetcar at Coolidge Corner in 1916

The first tracks on Beacon Street were laid in 1888, running from Massachusetts Avenue west to Coolidge Corner. The next year the rest of the line to Cleveland Circle opened, with access to the Reservoir carhouse. In 1889, the first electric streetcar route (see Green Line A branch) used Beacon Street from Coolidge Corner east to Massachusetts Avenue, then ran south on Massachusetts Avenue and east on Boylston Street to Park Square. That same year, the line on Beacon Street to Cleveland Circle was electrified. Another connection to the Beacon Street line was provided at Washington Square; streetcars came from Brookline Village along Washington Street and turned west on Beacon Street. This line was later extended north on Chestnut Hill Avenue and west on Commonwealth Avenue to Boston College and was the predecessor of the 65 bus route.

The Tremont Street subway opened on September 1, 1897; Beacon Street service was routed into the Public Garden incline at the Public Garden, turning around at Park Street. The Boylston Street subway opened on October 3, 1914, as a westward extension of the Tremont Street subway. The Beacon Street line entered just east of Kenmore Square.

On November 21, 1914, rush hour Washington Street service was cut back to Reservoir, leaving only Beacon Street cars using the Chestnut Hill Avenue tracks. Beacon Street service was cut to Reservoir on November 6, 1915, with Washington Street service extended back to Lake Street. Beginning on February 6, 1922, all Washington Street service was operated as a Brookline Village–Lake Street shuttle as part of service changes on the Huntington Avenue line. The Washington Street shuttle was converted to bus on April 24, 1926. It was redirected to Brighton Center on June 23, 1928, and eventually became route 65.

On December 14, 1929, most trips of the Kenmore–Lechmere shuttle were extended along Beacon Street to Washington Square. This resulted in 2 1/2-minute rush-hour headways on the inner part of the line, with three-car Washington Square–Lechmere trains and two-car Cleveland Circle–Park Street trains on alternating 5-minute headways. On January 9, 1930, the BERy began running Washington Square-bound streetcars express from Kenmore to Kent Street in the afternoon peak due to crowding. The Washington Street service was cut back to Kenmore in June 1930 but resumed that September.

=== Mid-century ===
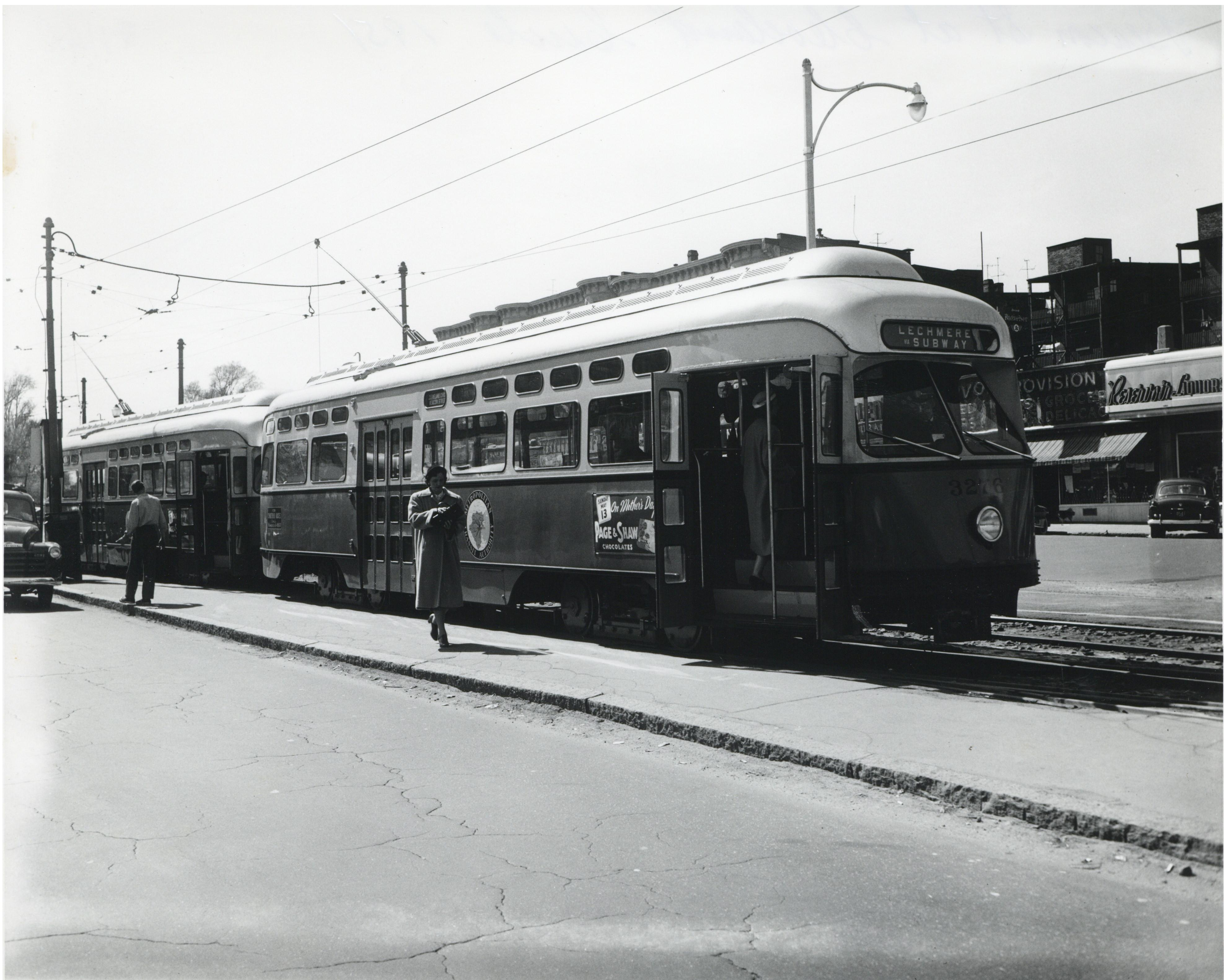
PCC streetcars at Cleveland Circle in 1951

On February 7, 1931, Commonwealth Avenue and Beacon Street service was extended from Park Street to Lechmere using three-car trains; the Washington Street short turns were cut back to Kenmore–Park Street shuttles. On October 23, 1932, a westward extension of the subway was opened with an underground Kenmore station. It split into separate tunnels for the Commonwealth Avenue and Beacon Street lines; the latter surfaced at Saint Mary's Street.

The first use of two-car trains of PCC streetcars on the system was on the Beacon Street line on April 16, 1945. At that time, service on the line operated every 2.8 minutes at morning peak, 6 minutes midday, and 2.7 minutes in the afternoon peak. The first use of a three-car train of PCC cars was on July 13, 1946, for a baseball extra; they entered regular service on September 16, 1946.

From 1940 until its 1967 naming as the C branch, the Beacon Street line had route number 61. The Riverside Line (later the D branch) was connected to the Beacon Street tunnel near Mountfort Street, with service beginning on July 4, 1959. On November 20, 1961, after 30 years running to Lechmere, the line was cut back to North Station (except Sundays).

=== MBTA era ===
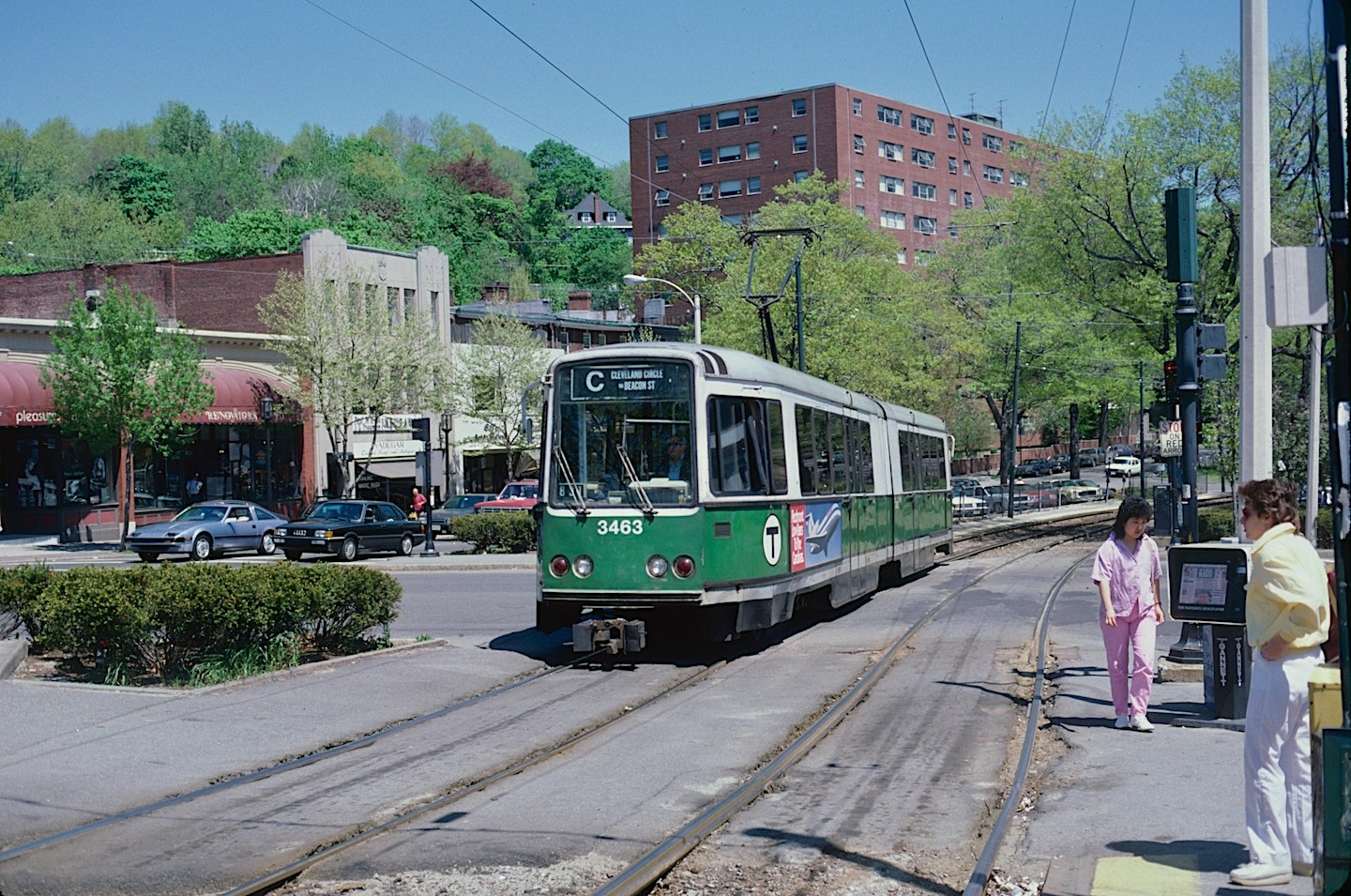
Now-discontinued Boeing US Standard Light Rail Vehicle crossing Washington Street in 1987

The Tremont Street Subway services were designated as the Green Line by the Massachusetts Bay Transportation Authority (MBTA). The Green Line branches were assigned letters in 1967; the Beacon Street line became the C branch. C branch service was extended back to Lechmere on March 25, 1967; Saturday service was briefly cut to Government Center from June–September 1968. From June 8 to September 11, 1974, D branch trains ran over the C branch due to track work. Trains used a temporary loop at Reservoir and non-revenue tracks on Chestnut Hill Avenue to cross between the two lines. From March 20 to June 25, 1976, C branch night service looped at Kenmore to allow electrical work in the central subway.

Boeing LRVs were first used on the line on January 20, 1978. By March 24, three-car trains of PCC streetcars were no longer used on the C branch; all service was two-car trains of PCCs or LRVs. From June to September 1979, all service on the line was with PCCs due to LRV maintenance issues. The line was cut back to Government Center except at rush hour from March 21 to June 21, 1980, and cut back to Park Street on April 4, 1981. The line was extended to Government Center on June 26, 1982, with LRVs providing all service.

From July 24 to September 10, 1982, the line was replaced by buses to allow for track replacement. Four stops were permanently closed to speed travel times. Service was extended to North Station on July 30, 1983; this was the terminal until a cut to Government Center on March 29, 1997. It was extended again to North Station on January 1, 2005. The C branch was cut to Government Center on October 24, 2021, as part of changes in preparation for the opening of the Green Line Extension later in the year.

The C branch runs on a dedicated median on Beacon Street in Brookline, with a total of 18 grade crossings at cross streets. Like on its sister B branch, C branch trains must stop on traffic signals at street crossings. The signals on Beacon Street in Brookline could be prioritized to make the Green Line run faster. The MBTA, which would be expected to pay for the sensors, did not consider the project to be cost-effective in 2007. In January 2008, the MBTA hired a consultant to study the issue. By 2011, the Town of Brookline was considering formally asking the MBTA to cooperate in setting up traffic signal prioritization on Beacon Street. In the 2017 "Go Boston 2030" plan, prioritizing traffic signals on Beacon Street was a proposal expected to be completed within five years.

All C branch service was replaced with buses from July 5 to August 1, 2020, to allow for track and platform work. Eleven grade crossings, 8,500 feet (2,600 m) of track, and the crossover at Cleveland Circle were replaced as part of the work, and all jointed track was welded together. C branch service was replaced by buses from July 11 to 22, 2022, to allow for trackwork and installation of train protection system equipment. From August 6–20, 2022, some C branch service was extended to Union Square while the E branch was closed for track work.

=== Accessibility renovations ===
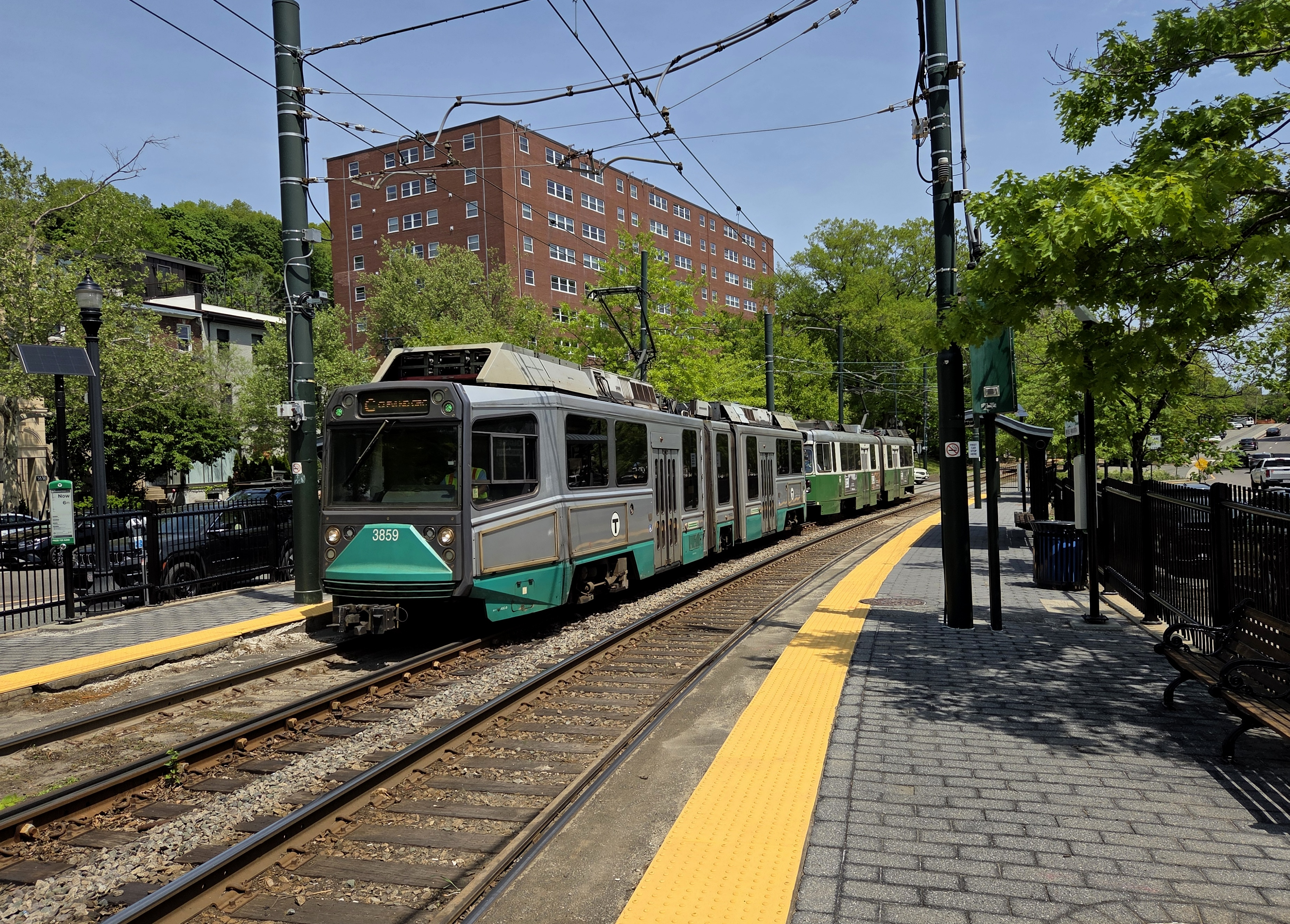
Accessible platforms at Washington Square

The introduction of low-floor LRVs in 2000 allowed for accessible service on the Green Line. In the early 2000s, the MBTA modified key surface stops with raised platforms as part of the Light Rail Accessibility Program. Portable lifts were installed at Coolidge Corner and Cleveland Circle around 2000. Four surface stops – Saint Mary's Street, Coolidge Corner, Washington Square, and Cleveland Circle – were modified with raised platforms in 2002–03.

Track work in 2018–19, which included replacement of platform edges at several stops, triggered requirements for accessibility modifications at those stops. Design work for Englewood Avenue, Tappan Street, Fairbanks Street, Brandon Hall, Summit Avenue, Saint Paul Street, Kent Street, and Hawes Street (all the remaining C Branch surface stops save for Dean Road) was 15% complete by June 2023. Designs for the stations (including Dean Road) were shown in February 2024. Kent Street station would be closed, while Fairbanks Street and Brandon Hall would be consolidated into a single station. Longer-term plans include island platforms at Coolidge Corner and Cleveland Circle, and relocation of the platforms at Washington Square and Saint Mary's Street.

In May 2024, the Federal Transit Administration awarded the MBTA $67 million to construct accessible platforms at 14 B and C branch stops. The MBTA awarded a $41.9 million design-build contract in April 2025. Construction began during a shutdown of the C Branch in May 2026 and is expected to be complete by the end of the year. Fairbanks Street station closed on November 7, 2026.

== Station listing ==
Location	Station	Opened	Notes and connections
East Cambridge	Lechmere	March 21, 2022	Original surface station was open from July 10, 1922, to May 23, 2020; it had not served the C branch since April 3, 1981. Current station for D and E branches.
West End	Science Park	August 20, 1955	Current station for D and E branches; has not served C branch since April 3, 1981.
North End	North Station	June 28, 2004	Current station for D and E branches; has not served C branch since October 23, 2021.
North End	Haymarket	September 3, 1898	Current station for D and E branches; has not served C branch since October 23, 2021.
Downtown Boston	Government Center	September 3, 1898	MBTA subway: Blue Line; MBTA bus: 354
Downtown Boston	Park Street	September 1, 1897	MBTA subway: Red Line, Silver Line (SL5); MBTA bus: 43; At Downtown Crossing: Orange Line; 7, 11, 501, 504, 505
Downtown Boston	Boylston	September 1, 1897	MBTA subway: Silver Line (SL5); MBTA bus: 43
Back Bay	Arlington	November 13, 1921	MBTA bus: 9, 10, 55, 501, 504
Back Bay	Copley	October 3, 1914	MBTA bus: 9, 10, 39, 55, 501, 504
Back Bay	Hynes Convention Center	October 3, 1914	MBTA bus: 1, 55
Fenway–Kenmore	Kenmore	October 23, 1932	MBTA bus: 8, 19, 57, 60; At Lansdowne: Framingham/Worcester Line
Brookline	Saint Mary's Street	1888	MBTA bus: 47, 85
Brookline	Carlton Street	1888	Closed July 24, 1982
Brookline	Hawes Street	1888	
Brookline	Kent Street	1888	
Brookline	Saint Paul Street	1888	
Brookline	Coolidge Corner	1888	MBTA bus: 66; Flixbus
Brookline	Winchester Street	1889	Closed July 24, 1982
Brookline	Summit Avenue	1889	
Brookline	Brandon Hall	1889	
Brookline	Fairbanks Street	1889	Closed November 7, 2026
Brookline	Washington Square	1889	MBTA bus: 65
Brookline	Winthrop Road	1889	Closed July 24, 1982
Brookline	Tappan Street	1889	
Brookline	Dean Road	1889	
Brookline	Englewood Avenue	1889	
Brookline	Strathmore Road	1889	Closed July 24, 1982
Brighton	Cleveland Circle	1889	At Reservoir:; 51, 86
