= Folding door =

Type of door with folding sections

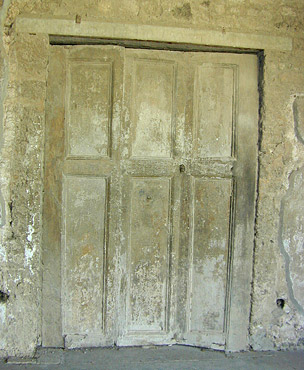
Roman folding door at Pompeii, Italy. (1st century AD)

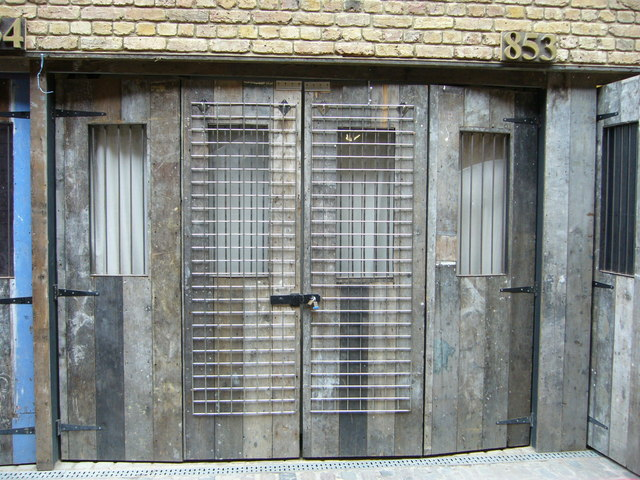
Stable doors in Camden, London

A folding door is a type of door which opens by folding back in sections or so-called panels. Folding doors are also known as 'bi-fold doors', in spite of them most often having more than two panels. Another term is 'concertina' doors, inspired by the musical instrument of the same name.

Folding doors can be used as internal or external room dividers and are made from a variety of materials. Most folding doors are glazed and the panels have frames of either wood, aluminium or upvc. They can open up and fold either internally or externally and are widely used in modern extensions.

Opposed to a conventional door with a standard aperture of 700-900 mm, most modern folding door (sets) can be up to several meters in width, and thereby considerably increase both physical and visual accessibility between either two internal rooms or an internal room and an outside space.

Historically folding doors were already known by the Romans as excavations in Pompeii have revealed. Peter Connolly writes in his book 'Pompeii' that the Romans 'disliked single-leaf doors and wherever possible, both inside and out, they used double or even folding doors'.

== See also ==
- Folding bus doors
