= Cleveland Circle station =

Light rail station in Boston, Massachusetts, US

Cleveland Circle
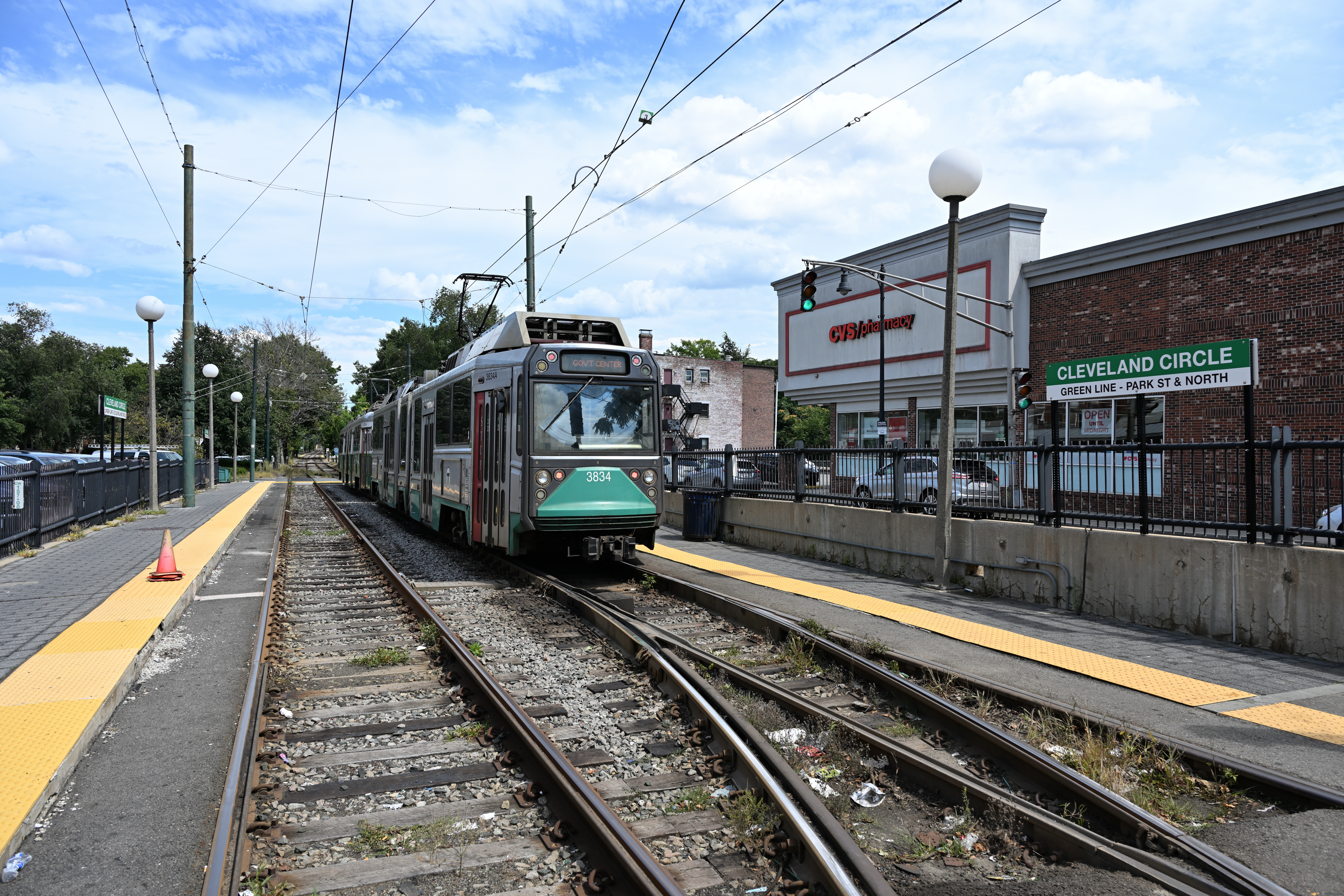
- An inbound train at Cleveland Circle in 2024

General information
- Location: Beacon Street at Chestnut Hill Avenue; Brighton, Boston, Massachusetts
- Coordinates: 42°20′10.4″N 71°8′56.4″W
- Platforms: 2 side platforms
- Tracks: 2
- Connections: MBTA bus (at Reservoir): 51, 86

Construction
- Accessible: Yes

History
- Opened: 1889
- Rebuilt: c.2003

Passengers
- 2011: 1,457 (daily average)

Services
Preceding station	MBTA	Following station
Terminus	Green Line C branch	Englewood Avenue toward Government Center
Location

Cleveland Circle station is a light rail stop that is the western terminal of the Green Line C branch of the MBTA subway system. It is located in the median of Beacon Street at Cleveland Circle in the Brighton neighborhood of Boston, Massachusetts. Cleveland Circle station is accessible, with raised platforms to accommodate low-floor light rail vehicles.

== History ==
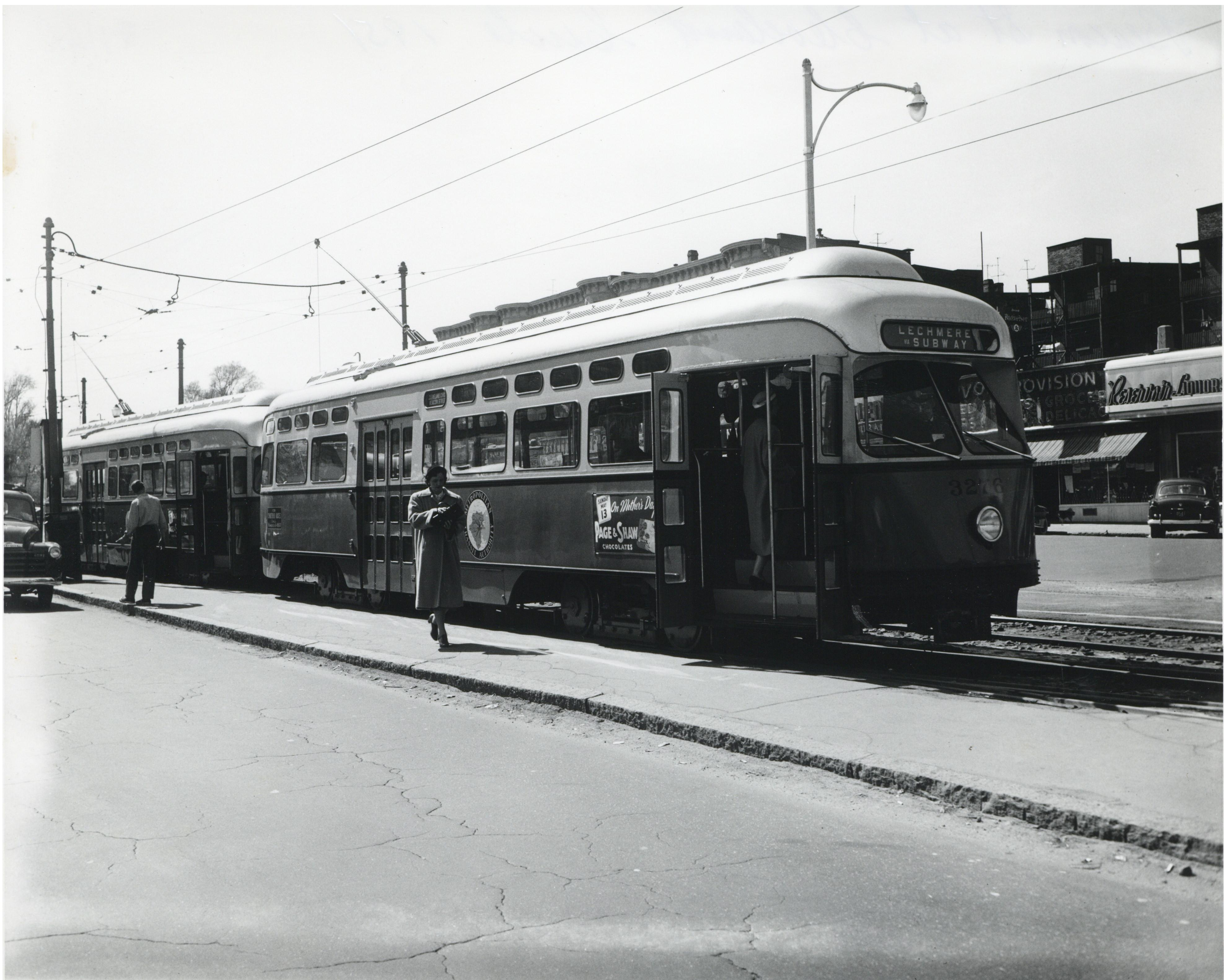
PCC streetcars at Cleveland Circle in 1951

The Beacon Street line opened in 1889; most streetcars ran through Cleveland Circle to Lake Street after 1896, with some terminating at the Chestnut Hill Carhouse (renamed Reservoir Carhouse around 1900). A waiting room was originally located in a leased building at the southeast corner of Cleveland Circle; it was heavily damaged by fire on December 10, 1897, and the West End Street Railway allowed the property to revert to the owner.

In 1915, the route was cut back to Reservoir, at the Reservoir Carhouse. Around 1947, the terminus was redesignated Cleveland Circle after the adjacent traffic circle, to differentiate it from the nearby commuter rail station – which, twelve years later, would become a streetcar station itself. Although Cleveland Circle is no longer a traffic circle, the station retains its name.

In the early 2000s, the MBTA modified key surface stops with raised platforms for accessibility. Portable lifts were installed at Cleveland Circle around 2000 as a temporary measure. The platform modifications - part of a $32 million modification of thirteen B, C, and E branch stations - were completed around 2003. On May 2, 2007, the MBTA added a wooden mini-high platform on the outbound side, allowing level deboarding from older Type 7 LRVs. These platforms were installed at eight Green Line stations in 2006–07 as part of the settlement of Joanne Daniels-Finegold, et al. v. MBTA. The ramp was removed in July 2020 during a track reconstruction project.

In February 2024, the MBTA indicated long-term plans to replace the existing platforms with a longer island platform extending east across Ayr Road.
