= Amory Street station =

Light rail station in Boston, Massachusetts, US

Amory Street
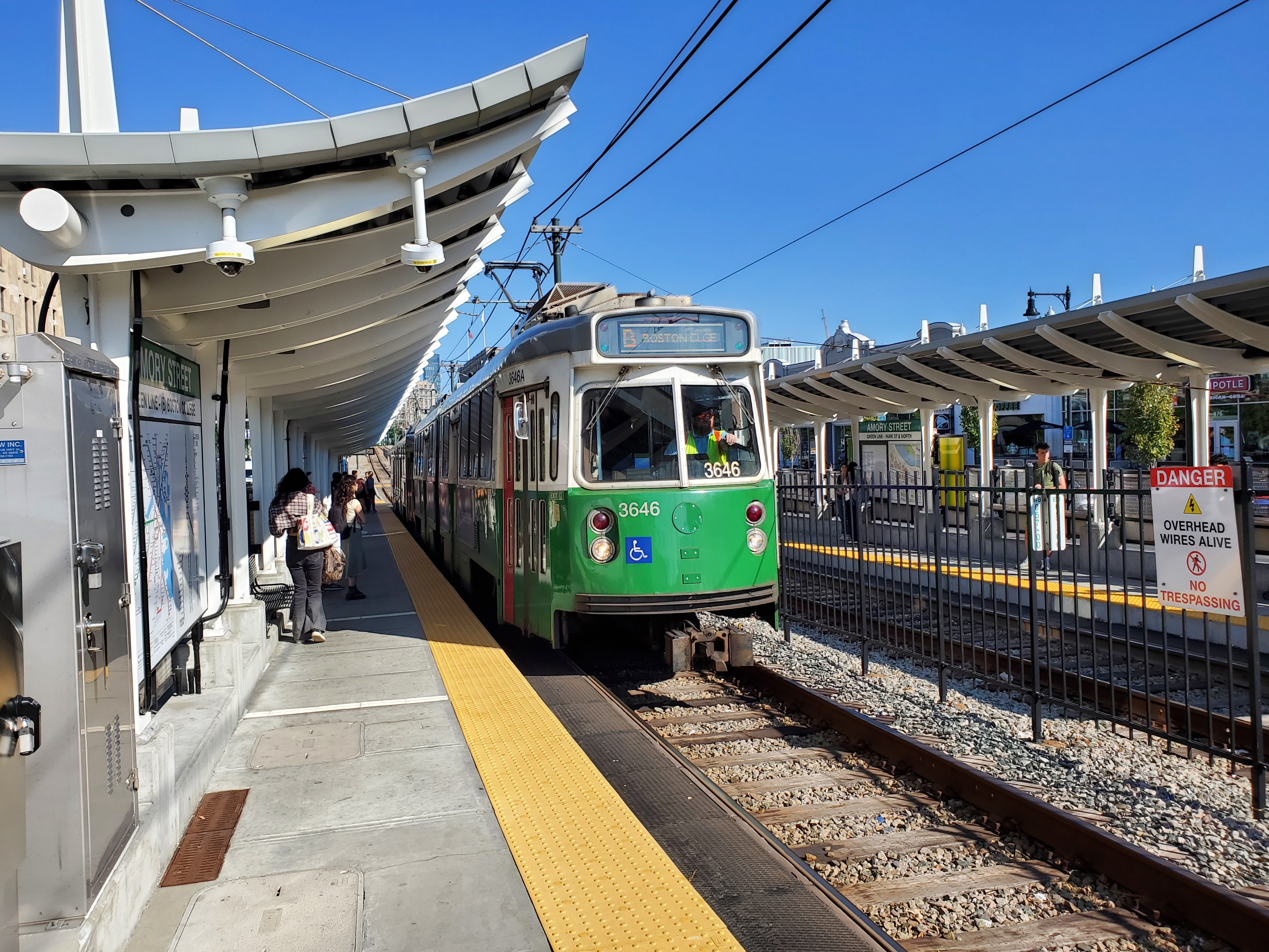
- An outbound train at Amory Street station in September 2024

General information
- Location: Commonwealth Avenue at Amory Street; Boston, Massachusetts
- Coordinates: 42.35099°N 71.11473°W
- Platforms: 2 side platforms
- Tracks: 2
- Connections: MBTA bus: 57

Construction
- Accessible: Yes

History
- Opened: May 18, 1896
- Rebuilt: February 15, 2021–November 15, 2021
- Former names: Saint Paul Street, Boston University West

Passengers
- 2011: Daily boardings: Saint Paul Street: 1,296; Boston University West: 704

Services
Preceding station	MBTA	Following station
Babcock Street toward Boston College	Green Line B branch	Boston University Central toward Government Center
Former services
Preceding station	MBTA	Following station
Pleasant Street toward Watertown	Green Line A branch	University Road toward Park Street
Location

Amory Street station is a light rail stop on the Green Line B branch of the MBTA subway system, located in the median of Commonwealth Avenue in the west part of the Boston University campus. The accessible station has two side platforms serving the line's two tracks, with access at Amory Street and Saint Paul Street.

Streetcar service on Commonwealth Avenue began in 1896 under the West End Street Railway. The line passed through several operators; in the 1960s, it became the Green Line B branch. Stops were located at Boston University West (Amory Street) and Saint Paul Street. Planning for consolidation of the two stations into a single accessible station as part of a stop consolidation project began in 2014. Construction of Amory Street station and nearby Babcock Street station began on February 15, 2021; they opened on November 15, 2021.

== Station layout ==
Amory Street station is located in the median of Commonwealth Avenue between Saint Paul Street and Amory Street, adjacent to the Boston University College of Fine Arts and College of General Studies buildings. The station has two accessible 225-foot (69 m)-long side platforms serving the two tracks of the B branch. The platforms are located in the middle of the 500-foot (150 m)-long block, with walkways from the platforms to the Saint Paul Street grade crossing and a pedestrian crossing at Amory Street. Each platform has a 150-foot (46 m)-long canopy for passengers, with wavy colored panels on both sides.

== History ==
=== Streetcar service ===
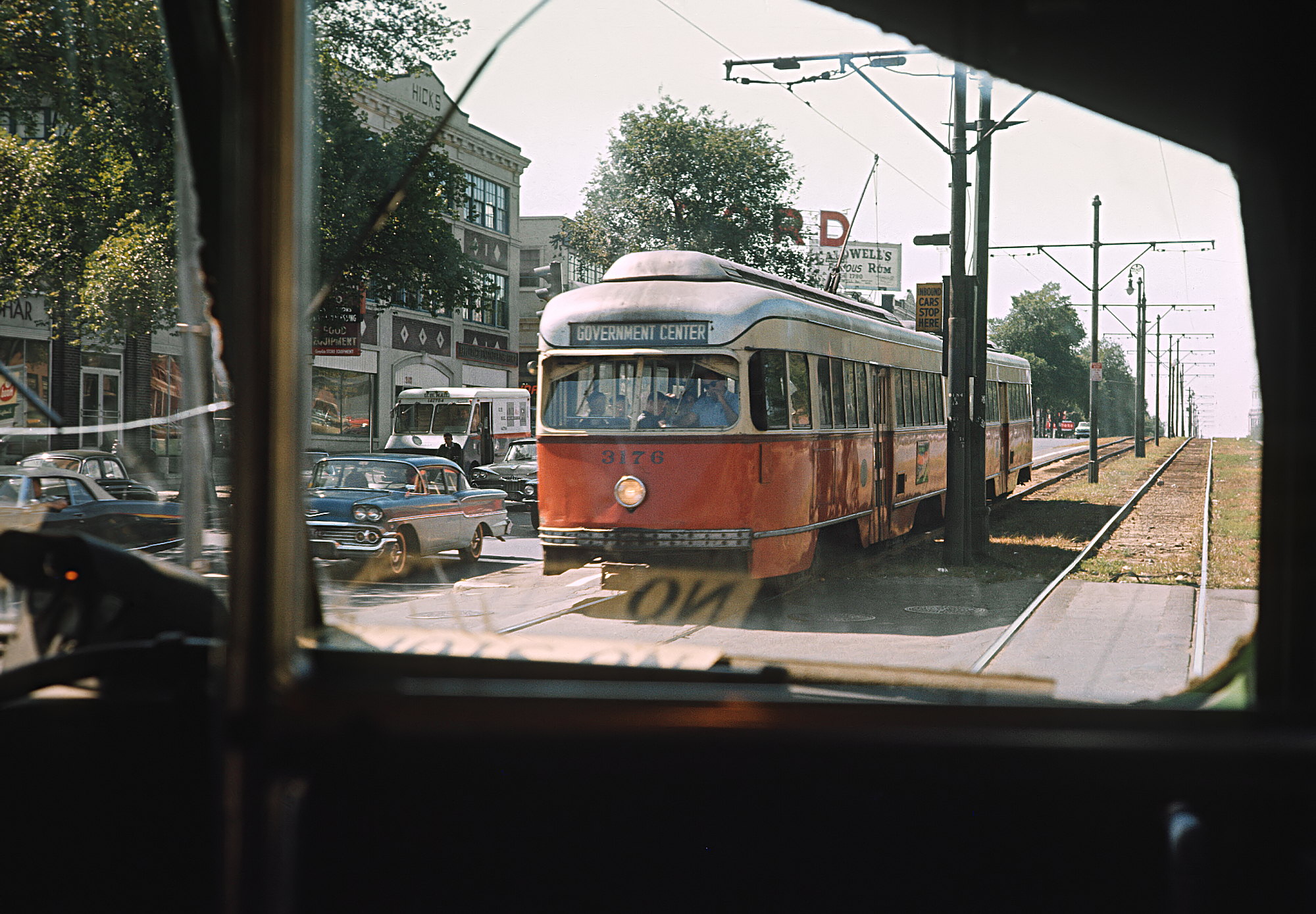
Streetcars at Saint Paul Street in 1965

The West End Street Railway built a new streetcar line in the median of Commonwealth Avenue in the mid-1890s. Service began on the new tracks between Governors Square and Union Square on May 18, 1896. This route was extended to Nonantum Square on existing tracks later that year; it began using the Tremont Street subway on November 8, 1897. The Boston Elevated Railway (BERy) leased the West End Street Railway on October 1, 1897, and continued its system expansion. New tracks on Commonwealth Avenue from Chestnut Hill Avenue to Brighton Avenue were opened by the BERy on May 26, 1900, allowing direct service from Lake Street to downtown via Commonwealth Avenue. The Nonantum Square line was extended to Watertown Yard in 1912, forming the service pattern for the next half-century.

The BERy was succeeded by the Metropolitan Transit Authority (MTA) in 1947; the MTA in turn was succeeded by the Massachusetts Bay Transportation Authority (MBTA) in 1964. The MBTA designated the remaining streetcar lines as the Green Line in 1965; in 1967, the Watertown line became the Green Line A branch, with the Lake Street (Boston College) line becoming the B branch. A branch service ended on June 21, 1969, leaving only the B branch on Commonwealth Avenue. By 1972, stops with small platforms were located on the east side of Amory Street (later called Boston University West) and the west side of Saint Paul Street, about 550 feet (170 m) apart.

As part of the MBTA's public art program, six new station signs at Boston University West were installed in 2010 featuring illustrations by Boston University College of Fine Arts graduate Andy Bell. Previously, in 2006, the signs had featured "Open Space", an exhibition of cloudscapes by undergraduate Seth Gadsden. Both installations were collaborations between the MBTA and the College of Fine Arts, which was located adjacent to the station.

=== Stop consolidation ===
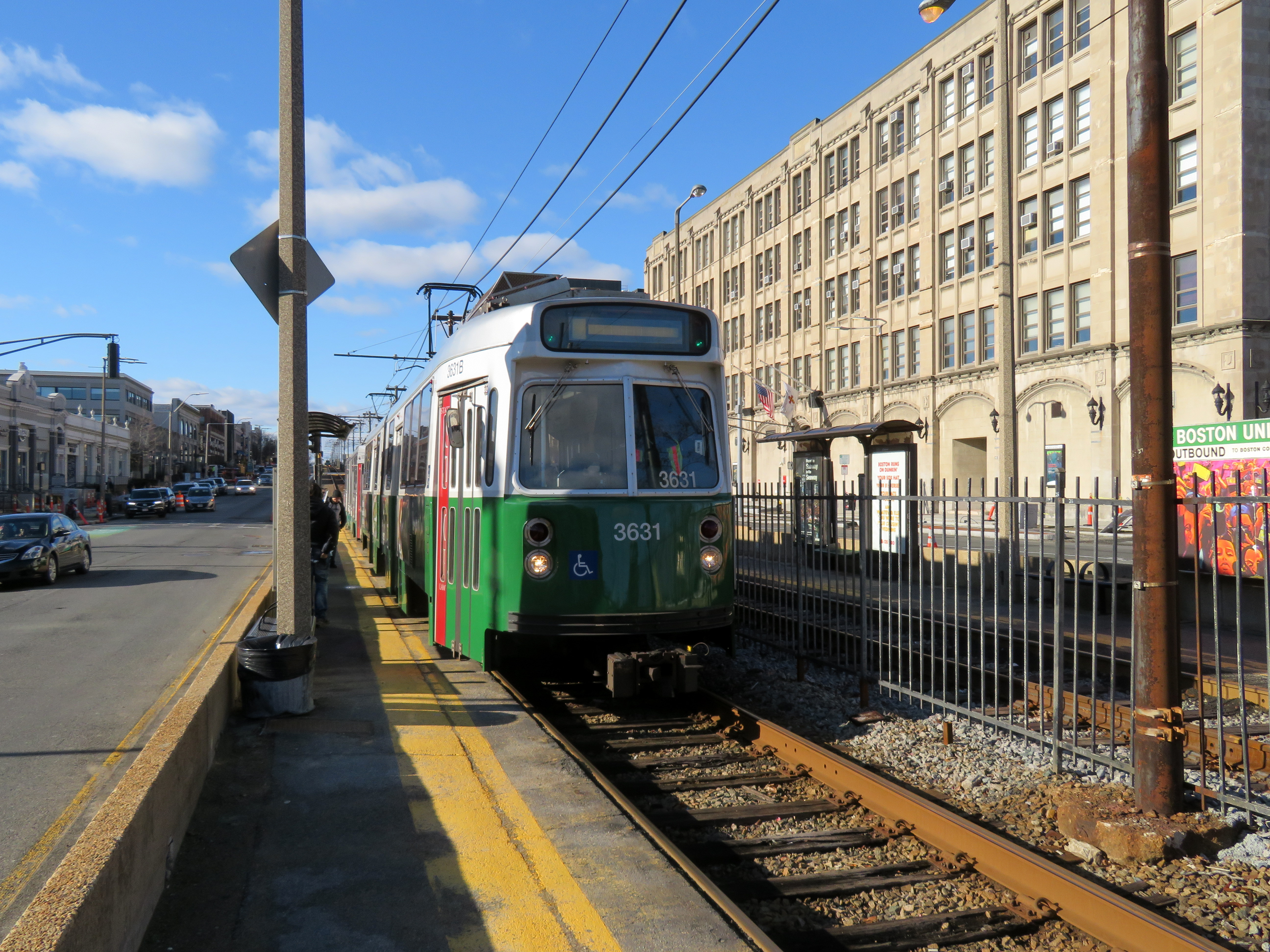
Boston University West station in 2018

In 2014, the MBTA began planning to consolidate four stops – Boston University West, Saint Paul Street, Pleasant Street, and Babcock Street – located near Boston University's West Campus. The four stops, which were not accessible, were to be turned into two fully accessible stops as part of a reconfiguration of Commonwealth Avenue between the Boston University Bridge and Packard's Corner. Boston University West and Saint Paul Street were to be consolidated into one station in the block between Amory Street and Saint Paul Street. Work was delayed by the need to complete other roadwork on Commonwealth Avenue.

The MBTA awarded a $17.8 million construction contract on March 23, 2020. Construction was set to last from February 2021 to early 2022, with night and weekend bustitution (replacement with bus service) for much of 2021. In February 2021, the MBTA announced that the new stop replacing Boston University West and Saint Paul Street would be named Amory Street. Buses replaced rail service between Washington Street and Kenmore from April 17 to May 9 and May 17 to June 13, 2021, allowing for construction of the new platforms and canopy steelwork.

Boston University West and Saint Paul Street stations were closed at the end of service on Friday, November 12, 2021. After a weekend closure, Amory Street station opened on November 15. Boston University planned to display Andy Bell's artworks elsewhere on its campus.
