= Babcock Street station =

Light rail station in Boston, Massachusetts, US

Babcock Street
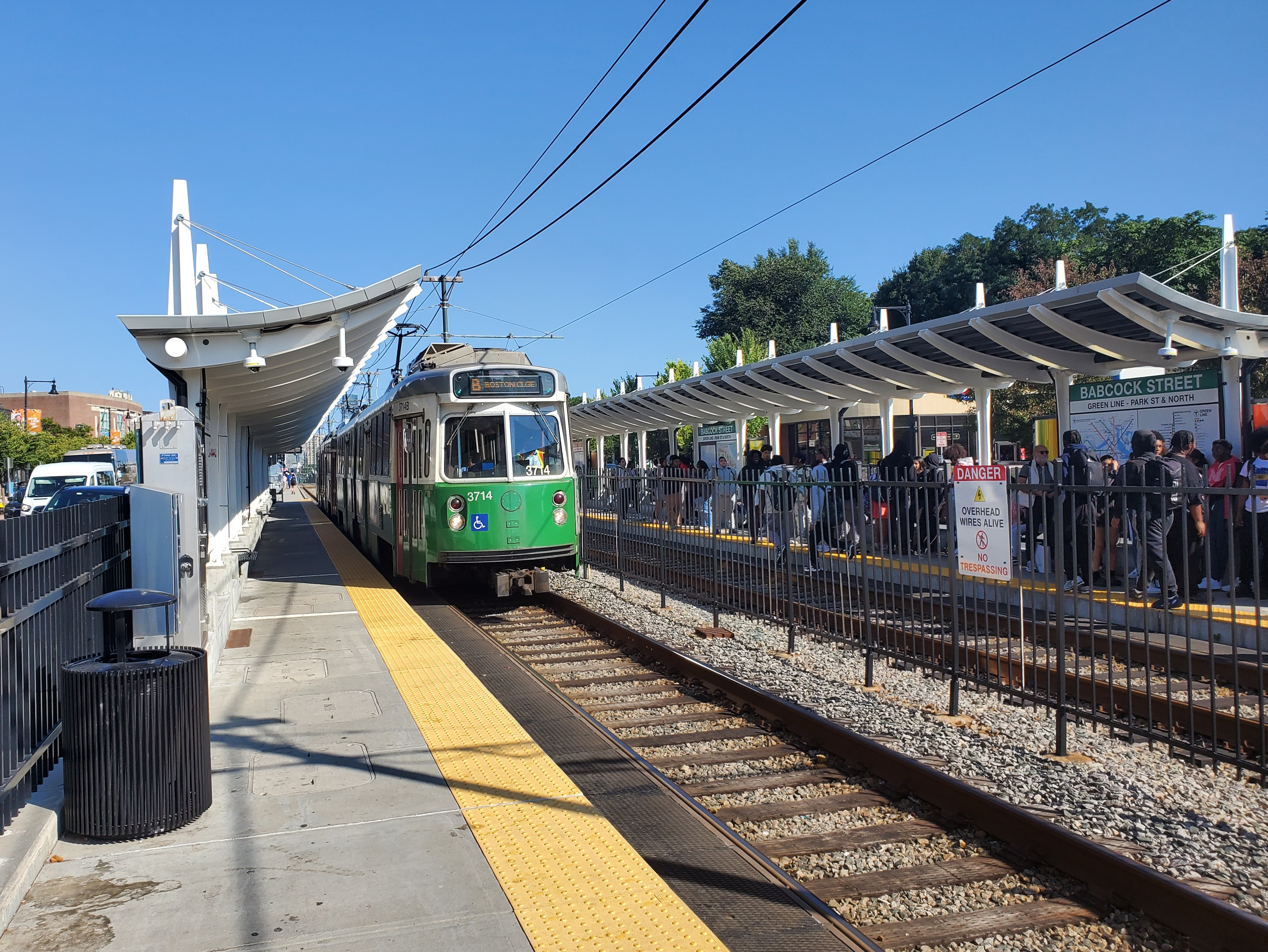
- An outbound train at Babcock Street station in December 2021

General information
- Location: Commonwealth Avenue at Babcock Street; Boston, Massachusetts
- Coordinates: 42.35161°N 71.11988°W
- Platforms: 2 side platforms
- Tracks: 2
- Connections: MBTA bus: 57

Construction
- Accessible: Yes

History
- Opened: May 18, 1896
- Rebuilt: 1970s; February 15, 2021–November 15, 2021

Passengers
- 2011: Daily boardings: Babcock Street: 1,387; Pleasant Street: 1,167

Services
Preceding station	MBTA	Following station
Packards Corner toward Boston College	Green Line B branch	Amory Street toward Government Center
Former services
Preceding station	MBTA	Following station
Packards Corner toward Watertown	Green Line A branch	Pleasant Street toward Park Street
Location

Babcock Street station is a light rail stop on the Green Line B branch of the MBTA subway system, located in the median of Commonwealth Avenue in the west part of the Boston University campus. The accessible station has two side platforms serving the line's two tracks, with access at Babcock Street and Pleasant Street.

Streetcar service on Commonwealth Avenue began in 1896 under the West End Street Railway. The line passed through several operators; in the 1960s, it became the Green Line B branch. Stops were located at Alcorn Street – moved east to Babcock Street around 1975 – and Pleasant Street. Planning for consolidation of the two stations into a single accessible station as part of a stop consolidation project began in 2014. Construction of Babcock Street station and nearby Amory Street station began in February 2021; they opened on November 15, 2021.

== Station layout ==
Babcock Street station is located in the median of Commonwealth Avenue between Harry Agganis Way and Babcock Street, adjacent to the West Campus section of Boston University. The station has two accessible 225-foot (69 m)-long side platforms serving the two tracks of the B branch. The platforms are located in the middle of the 720-foot (220 m)-long block, with walkways from the platforms to both streets. Each platform has a 150-foot (46 m)-long canopy for passengers, with wavy colored panels on both sides.

== History ==
=== Streetcar service ===
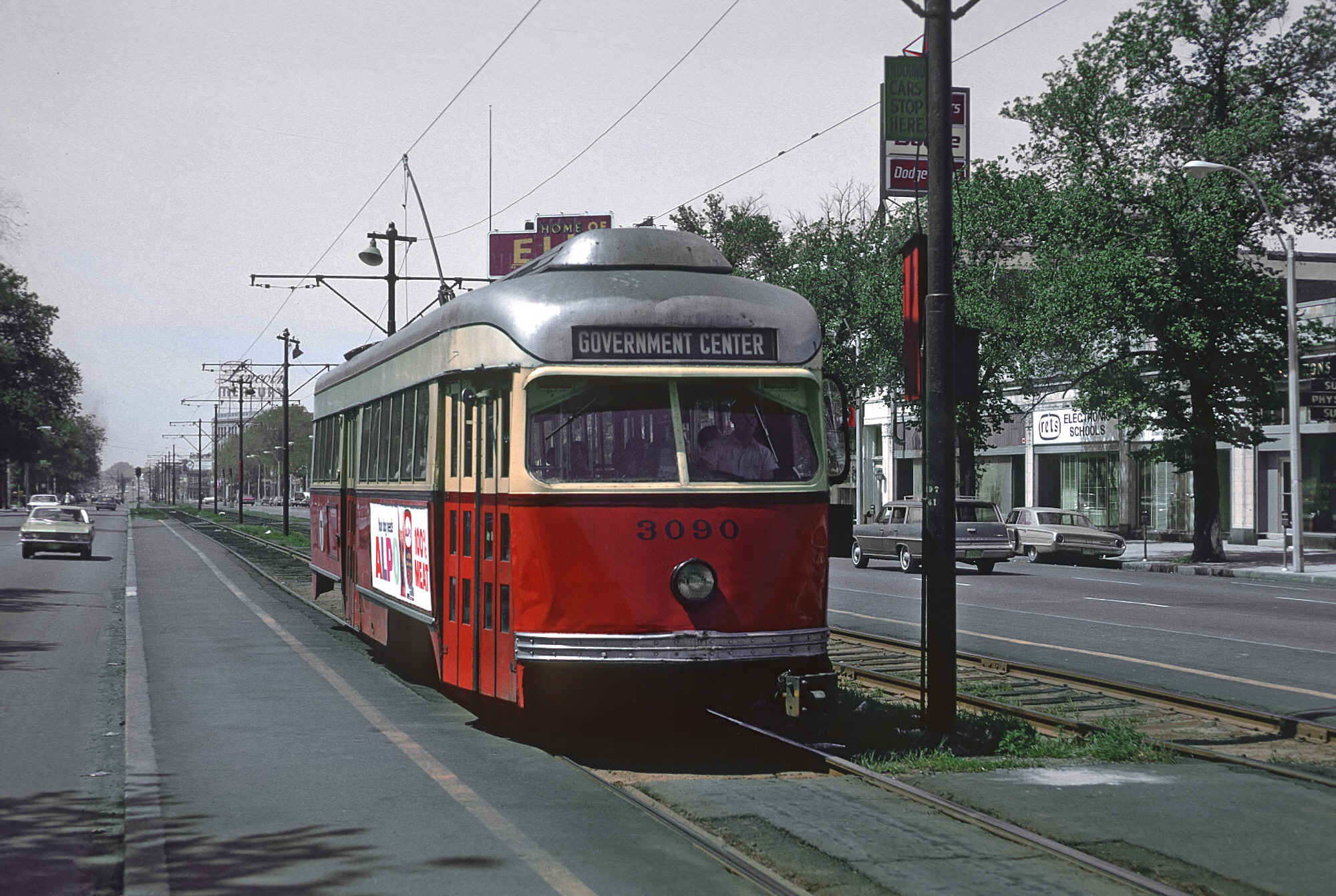
A streetcar at Pleasant Street in 1968

The West End Street Railway built a new streetcar line in the median of Commonwealth Avenue in the mid-1890s. Service began on the new tracks between Governors Square and Union Square on May 18, 1896. This route was extended to Nonantum Square on existing tracks later that year; it began using the Tremont Street subway on November 8, 1897. The Boston Elevated Railway (BERy) leased the West End Street Railway on October 1, 1897, and continued its system expansion. New tracks on Commonwealth Avenue from Chestnut Hill Avenue to Brighton Avenue were opened by the BERy on May 26, 1900, allowing direct service from Lake Street to downtown via Commonwealth Avenue. The Nonantum Square line was extended to Watertown Yard in 1912, forming the service pattern for the next half-century.

The new Braves Field opened on August 18, 1915; it included a loop track between Gaffney Street and Babcock Street with a prepayment station to allow streetcars to directly serve the ballpark. It was also used to turn trains for Red Sox games at Fenway Park, and for rush-hour short turns; after November 1945, these short turns also operated during midday and on Saturdays. It was heavily used during Braves games; for the 1948 World Series, streetcars ran between Park Street and Braves Field on 45-second headways. Boston University purchased Braves Field in 1953 when the Braves moved to Milwaukee, and soon wished to use the loop area for other purposes. After several years of requests, the loop was abandoned on January 15, 1962.

The loop site was proposed for a transfer station (to allow rapid transit service through the subway to Lechmere) in 1921. The proposed station was moved west to Harvard Avenue the next year. In May 1924, the state legislature directed the Metropolitan District Commission to plan an expanded rapid transit system in Boston. The report, released in December 1926, called for the existing streetcar tunnels in Boston to be reorganized into two rapid transit lines with high-floor rolling stock. The Commonwealth Avenue line would have been converted as part of the plan, with a transfer station on Warren Street in Allston; among the intermediate stops would have been Gaffney Street.That plan was never implemented.

The BERy was succeeded by the Metropolitan Transit Authority (MTA) in 1947; the MTA in turn was succeeded by the Massachusetts Bay Transportation Authority (MBTA) in 1964. The MBTA designated the remaining streetcar lines as the Green Line in 1965; in 1967, the Watertown line became the Green Line A branch, with the Lake Street (Boston College) line becoming the B branch. A branch service ended on June 21, 1969, leaving only the B branch on Commonwealth Avenue. By 1972, stops with small platforms were located at Alcorn Street and Pleasant Street. Around 1975, the Alcorn Street stop was relocated east to Babcock Street.

=== Stop consolidation ===
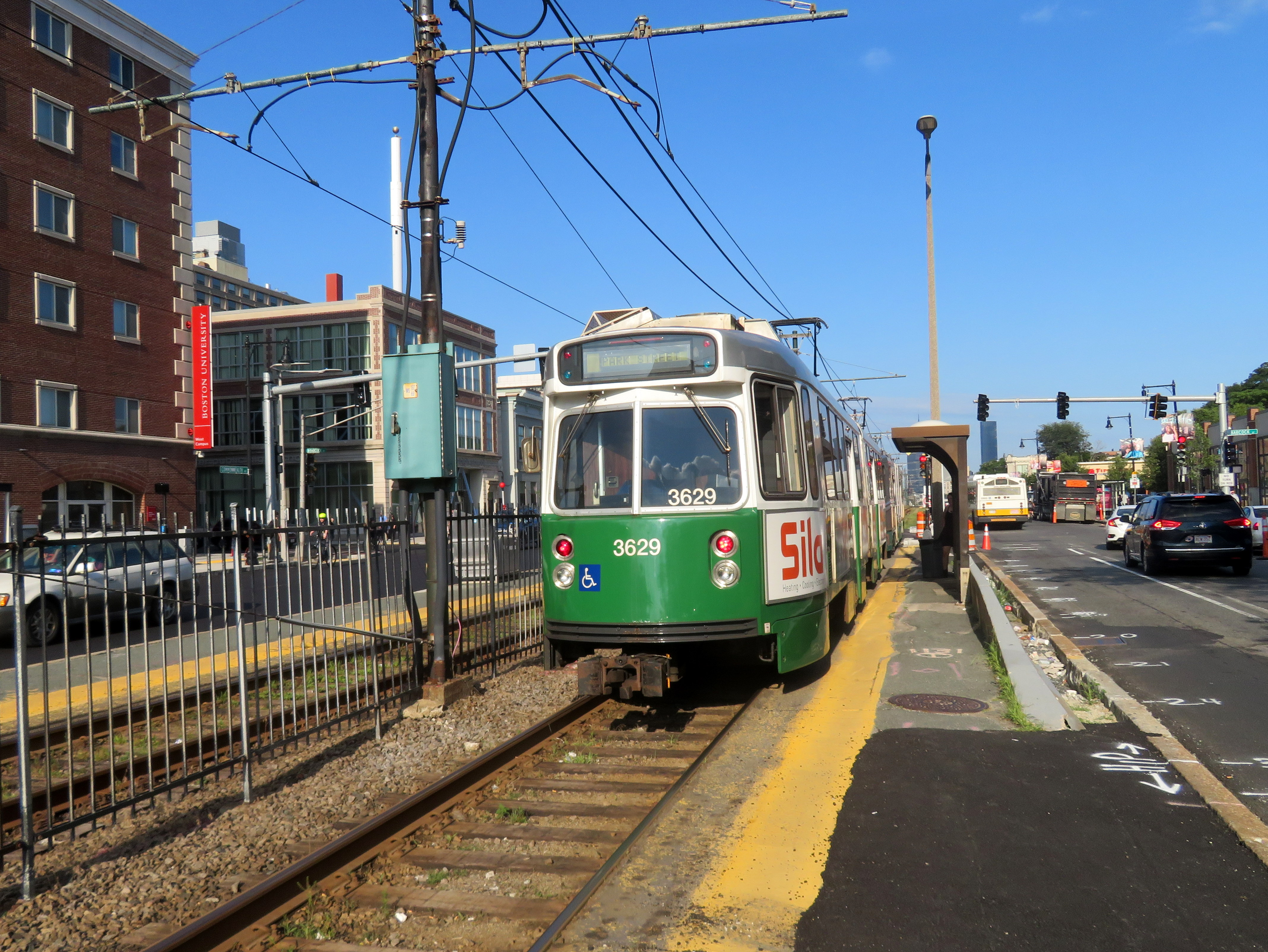
A train at Babcock Street in 2019

In 2014, the MBTA began planning to consolidate four stops – Boston University West, Saint Paul Street, Pleasant Street, and Babcock Street – located near Boston University's West Campus. The four stops, which were not accessible, were to be turned into two fully accessible stops as part of a reconfiguration of Commonwealth Avenue between the Boston University Bridge and Packard's Corner. Pleasant Street and Babcock Street stations would be consolidated into one station in the block between the two streets. Work was delayed by the need to complete other roadwork on Commonwealth Avenue.

The MBTA awarded a $17.8 million construction contract on March 23, 2020. Construction was set to last from February 2021 to early 2022, with night and weekend bustitution (replacement with bus service) for much of 2021. In February 2021, the MBTA announced that the new stop replacing Babcock Street and Pleasant Street would be named Babcock Street. Pleasant Street station permanently closed on February 26, 2021, so that construction of the replacement station could begin. Buses replaced rail service between Washington Street and Kenmore from April 17 to May 9 and May 17 to June 13, 2021, allowing for construction of the new platforms and canopy steelwork. On July 30, 2021, two westbound trains collided next to the under-construction station, causing 25 injuries.

The old Babcock Street station was closed at the end of service on Friday, November 12, 2021. After a weekend closure, the new Babcock Street station opened on November 15; the former station was soon removed.
