= Packards Corner station =

Light rail station in Boston, Massachusetts, US

Packards Corner
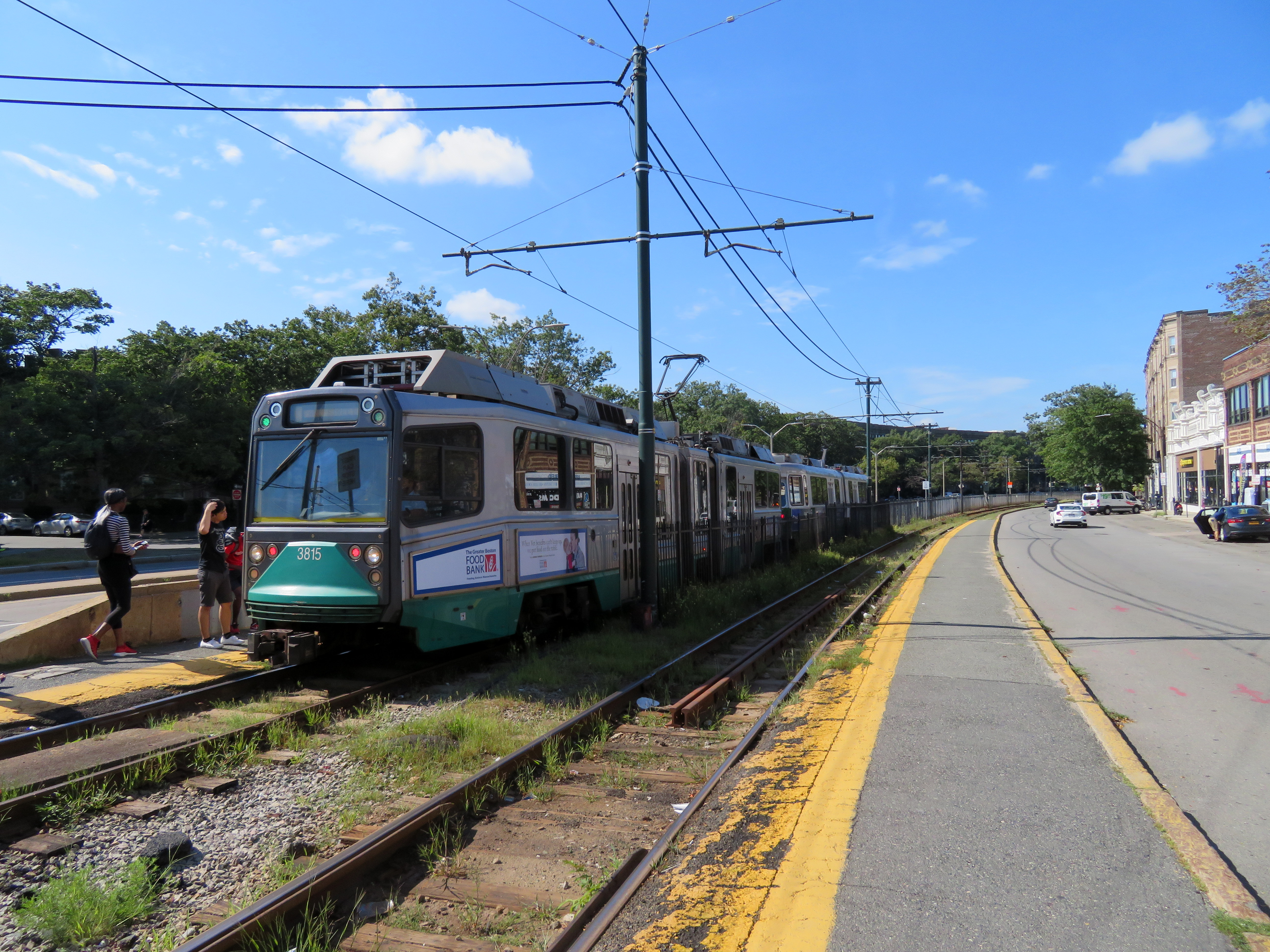
- An inbound train at Packards Corner station in 2018

General information
- Location: Commonwealth Avenue at Brighton Avenue; Allston, Boston, Massachusetts
- Coordinates: 42.35176°N 71.12529°W
- Platforms: 2 side platforms
- Tracks: 2
- Connections: MBTA bus: 57

Construction
- Accessible: No

History
- Rebuilt: 2027–2028 (planned)

Passengers
- 2011: 2,654 daily boardings

Services
Preceding station	MBTA	Following station
Harvard Avenue toward Boston College	Green Line B branch	Babcock Street toward Government Center
Former services
Preceding station	MBTA	Following station
Union Square toward Watertown	Green Line A branch (closed 1969)	Alcorn Street toward Park Street
Location

Packards Corner station is a light rail stop on the MBTA's Green Line B branch located at Packard's Corner—the intersection of Commonwealth Avenue and Brighton Avenue—in Allston, Boston, Massachusetts. The station is located in a median between the westbound travel lanes and frontage road of Commonwealth Avenue. It is planned to be rebuilt in 2027–2028 for accessibility.

== History ==
The Green Line A branch formerly diverged just north of the platforms; its streetcars stopped at separate platforms on Brighton Avenue. The Brighton Avenue streetcar reservation was removed from July 1 to October 5, 1949, and the side platforms for the Watertown Line were replaced with an island platform. The A branch was closed on June 21, 1969, and replaced with the route 57 bus, though the trackage was retained for non-revenue moves to Watertown Yard. The line was finally abandoned in 1994; a several-hundred-foot stub track was left until the mid-2000s to temporarily store disabled trains. The switch and the last few feet of track were not disconnected until track work in 2014.

Packards Corner was not made accessible during the initial 2001–03 round of Green Line station renovations. In 2019, the MBTA listed Packards Corner as a "Tier I" accessibility priority. Track work in 2018–19, which included replacement of platform edges at several stops, triggered requirements for accessibility modifications at those stops. Design for Packards Corner and four other B Branch stops was 30% complete by December 2022. By November 2023, construction was expected to begin at Packards Corner in spring 2024, ahead of other B Branch stations.

A design shown in March 2024 called for the platforms to be rebuilt at their current locations, with a new track crossing and crosswalk to the west sidewalk at the south end of the station. In May 2024, the Federal Transit Administration awarded the MBTA $67 million to construct accessible platforms at 14 B and C branch stops including Packards Corner. Additional stops were added to the B branch project in 2024. By July 2026, the MBTA expected to issue a $73 million design-build contract in August 2026, with construction lasting from mid-2027 to late 2028. Bids received were higher than expected. In October 2026, the MBTA indicated the project was being rescoped; the contract would be rebid and awarded in 2027, with construction lasting through 2028.

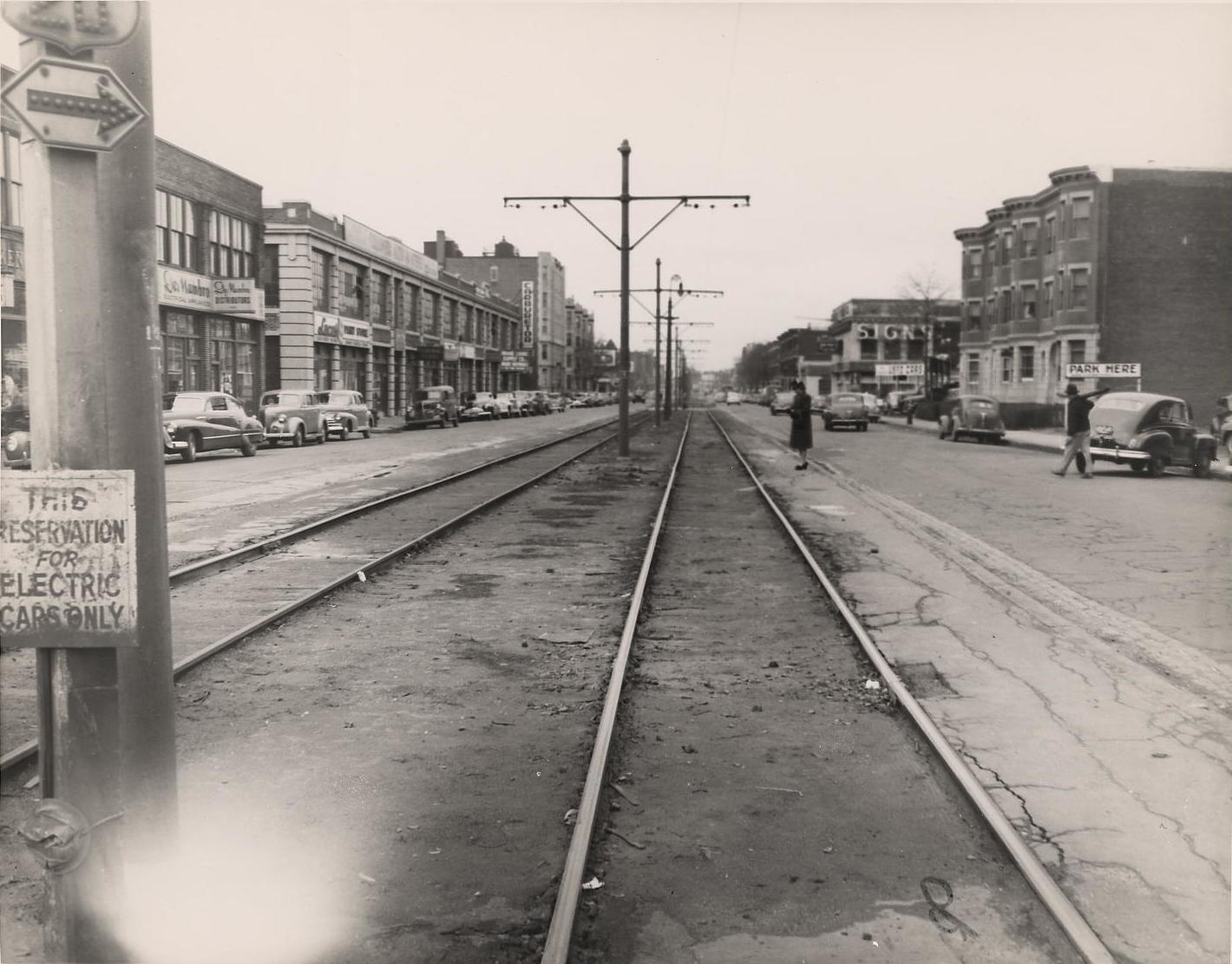
Watertown Line (future A Branch) platforms in 1948

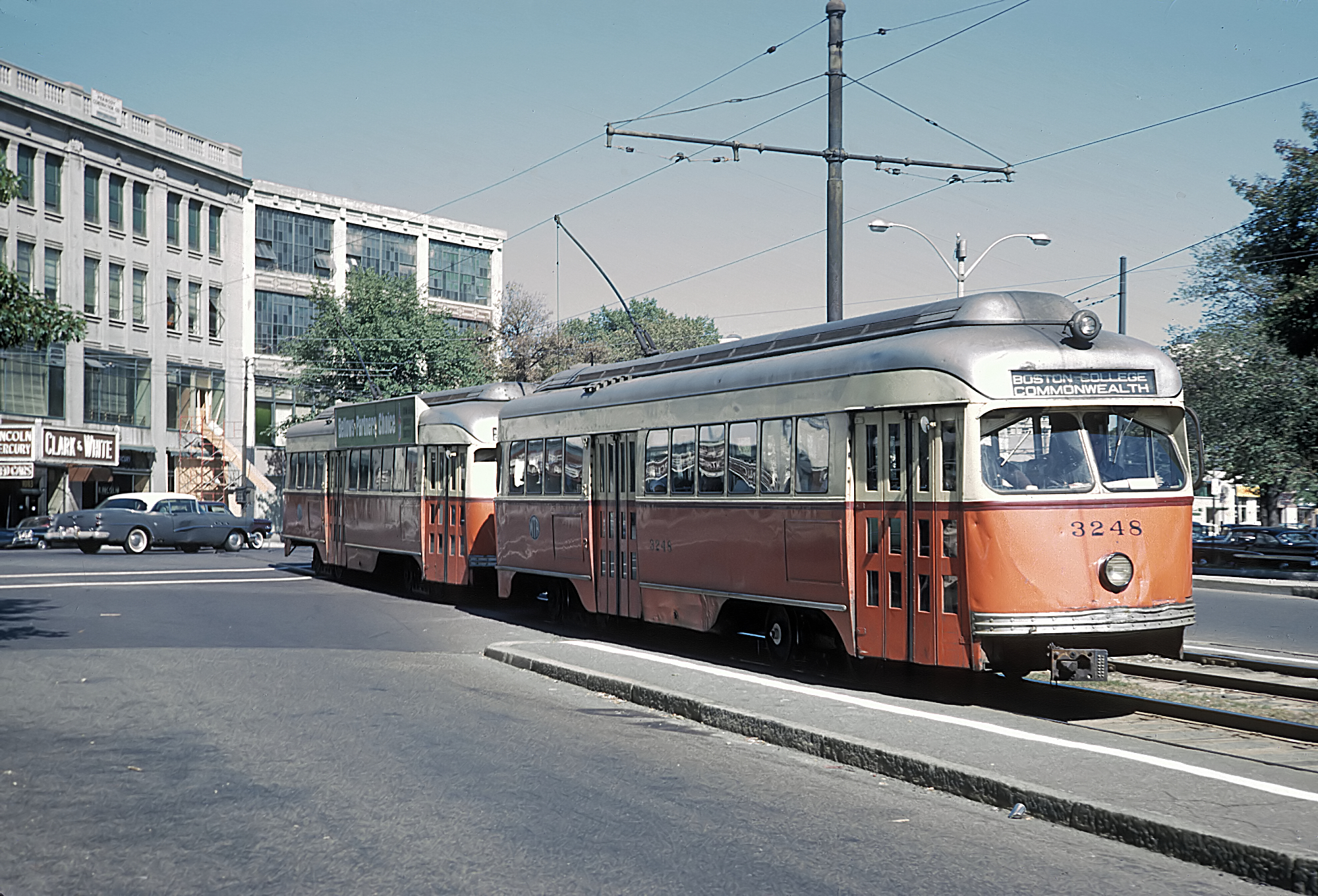
A Boston College-bound (future B Branch) train at Packards Corner in 1965

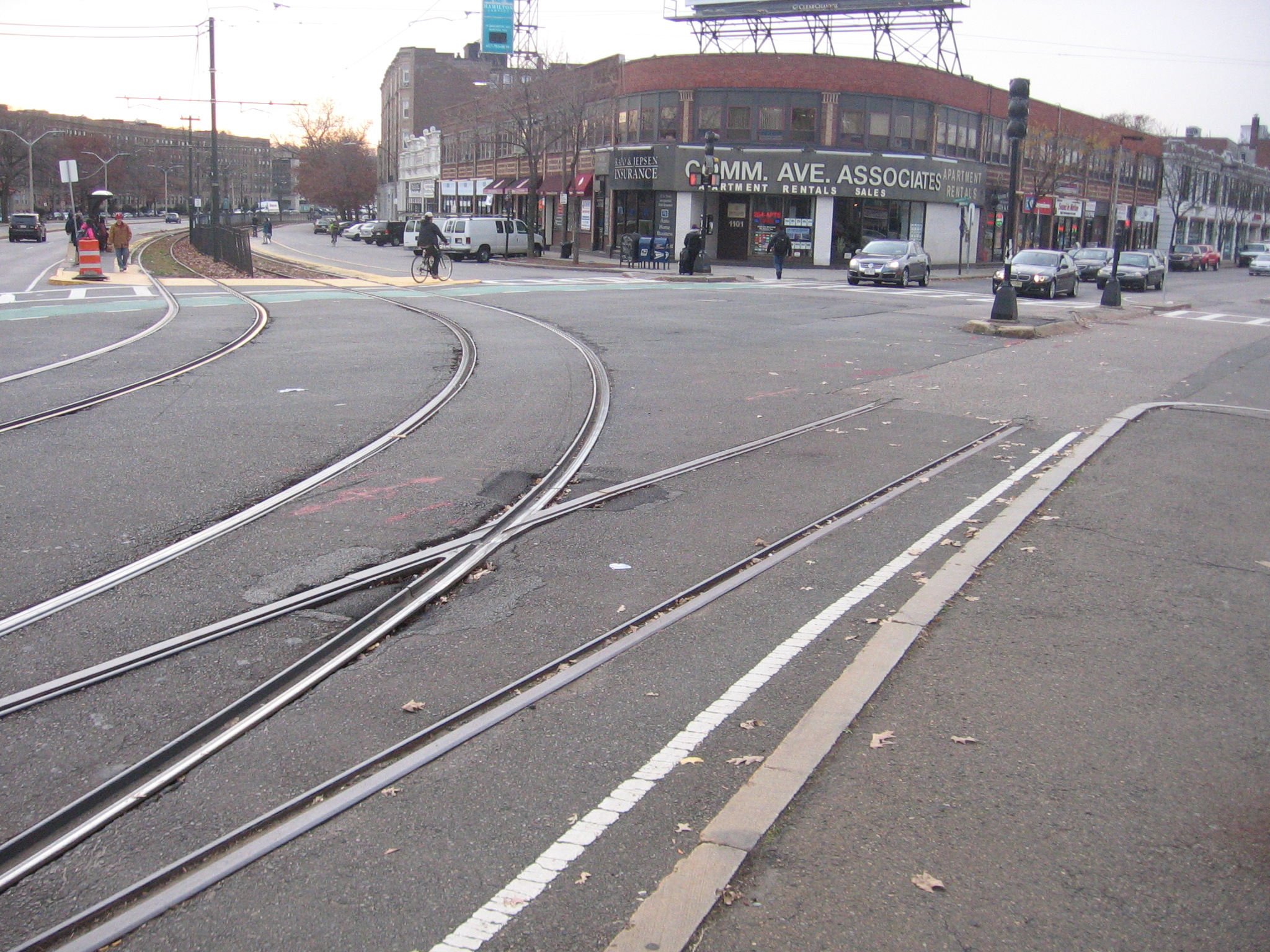
Former A branch turnout switch in 2011
