= Oak Square station =

Boston MBTA former subway station

Oak Square
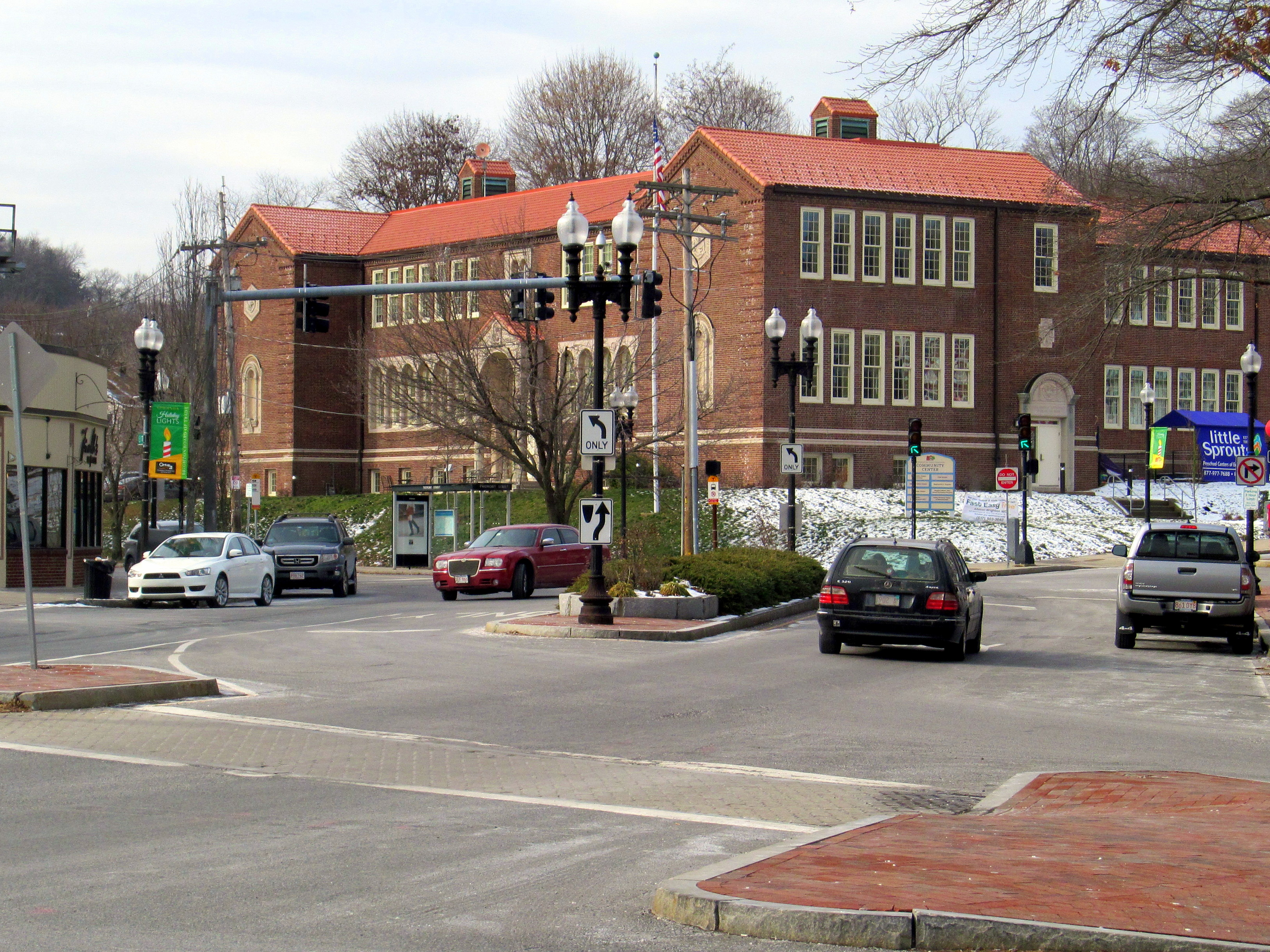
- Oak Square platform location in 2016

General information
- Coordinates: 42°21′2.40″N 71°10′5.35″W
- Owner: Massachusetts Bay Transportation Authority
- Tracks: 2

History
- Closed: June 21, 1969

Services
| Preceding station | MBTA | Following station |
|---|---|---|
| Newton Corner toward Watertown | Green Line A branch | Union Square toward Park Street |
Location

Oak Square is a former station on the Green Line A branch. Located in Brighton, Massachusetts, it was closed in 1969, when service on the branch was replaced with buses.
