= Middlesex and Boston Street Railway =

Transport company in Massachusetts, US

The Middlesex and Boston Street Railway (M&B) was a streetcar and later bus company in the area west of Boston. Streetcars last ran in 1930, and in 1972, the company's operations were merged into the Massachusetts Bay Transportation Authority (MBTA).

== History ==
The company was first chartered as the Natick Electric Street Railway on August 10, 1891. The name was changed to the South Middlesex Street Railway in 1893. That company went bankrupt and a receiver was appointed May 6, 1903; the property was sold on August 15, 1907, to the newly formed Middlesex and Boston Street Railway. By 1910, Boston Suburban Electric Companies, a holding company, had bought the M&B.

In September 1964 the MBTA began subsidizing the M&B, and route numbers were given to its buses. The M&B was taken over by the MBTA on July 5, 1972, after a financial dispute over subsidies stopped service on June 30. The routes taken over were renumbered by adding a 5 to the beginning and were renumbered in September 1982 and some in 1996.

There is one streetcar and one bus preserved from this railway, trolley # 41, a former Lexington car, and bus # 192, a 1948 ACF Brill bus. They are both located at the Seashore Trolley Museum in Kennebunkport, Maine.

=== Auburndale–Lake Street via Commonwealth Avenue ===
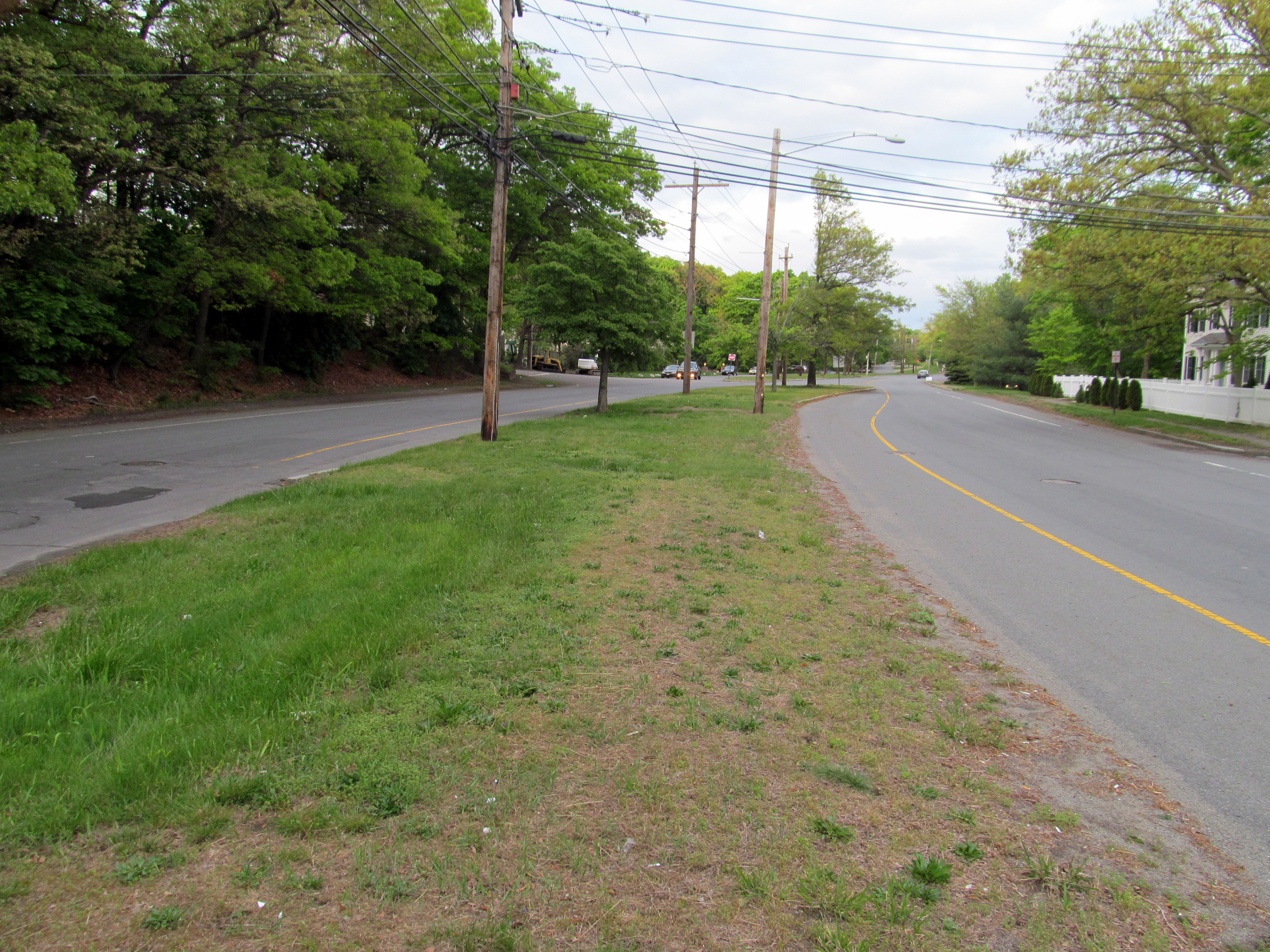
Wide median of Commonwealth Avenue in Auburndale, once used by M&B trolleys, near Norumbega Park

The Commonwealth Avenue Street Railway was opened on March 26, 1896. The line ran down the median the entire length of Commonwealth Avenue in Newton from Auburndale to Boston College, where it connected with the Commonwealth Avenue line of the Boston Elevated Railway. The latter line did not opened until August 15, 1896; omnibuses were temporarily run between Reservoir and Lake Street. The company opened Norumbega Park on June 17, 1897, as an amusement park to increase traffic on the line. Through service between Norumbega Park and Park Street was run from January 17, 1903, to November 1, 1914.

In December 1895, the company was denied rights to construct a branch over Center Street from its not-yet-complete Commonwealth Avenue line to Newton Center because of its refusal to pay for street widening. However, the branch was later approved and constructed, allowing the line to complete with the Newton and Boston Street Railway's Newton Center branch. An extension from Newton Center to Newton Highlands via Cypress, Paul, and Center opened on June 15, 1899.

The line was consolidated into the Newton Street Railway on January 1, 1904; the Newton Street Railway was merged with the M&B on July 1, 1909. The Commonwealth Avenue line was the last of the M&B streetcar routes to be converted to buses; this occurred in April 1930. The park closed in 1964.

Route 35 Auburndale–Lake Street was not initially operated by the MBTA upon the July 1972 takeover. The MBTA resumed service in January 1973 as rush hour-only route 535 Auburndale–Boston College via Commonwealth Avenue. Largely used by domestic workers commuting to wealthy neighborhoods in Newton, it was dropped in June 1976.

=== Bedford–Lowell ===
From Bedford, cars left every 15 minutes in the summer, and every half-hour in the winter, for

- Boston via Lexington with a change at Arlington Heights
- Maynard and Hudson with a change at Concord
- Lowell with a change at Billerica

Fare limits were at the town lines of Bedford with Lexington, Concord, and Billerica.

The line from Lexington ran down Bedford Street and the Great Road, diverting along Loomis Street and South Road to connect with the Boston and Maine Railroad station. A passing track was located on the north side of Bedford Common.

As at Norumbega, an amusement park was built in Lexington near the Bedford town line, to attract riders from the city.

The Bedford–Arlington Heights bus, today's 62 was M&B route 29 and MBTA route 529.

The car-barn and electricity generator were located in North Lexington north of Bedford Street and just west of the corner of what is now Worthen Road. The complex was composed of at least a long wooden building (the carbarn) and a squat brick structure with a short smokestack (the generating plant); that complex was a lumberyard for many years and was redeveloped in the late 1980s.

=== Waltham–Newton ===
The Waltham and Newton Street Railway was chartered on July 13, 1866, and began service on August 31, 1868. Its tracks ran from the split between Pleasant Street and Main Street, west of Waltham center, via Main Street, Moody Street, Crescent Street and Moody Street to the Newton line, then via Lexington Street, River Street, Elm Street and Washington Street to end at Highland Street in West Newton.

In 1889 the Newton Street Railway bought the line, and the Newton Street Railway was merged with the M&B July 1, 1909. It later (by 1964) became much of the 20 Newton Corner–Riverside via Roberts and Central Square Waltham bus line, with the 27 Newton Corner–Riverside via Auburndale and Central Square Waltham using much of Crescent Street (the 20 went straight through on Moody Street). This is now the 553 Roberts–Downtown Boston via Newton Corner and Central Square Waltham, with Crescent Street served by the 558 Riverside–Downtown Boston via Auburndale, Central Square Waltham and Newton Corner.

=== Other routes ===
- 23: Watertown Square – Stow & Main Street Waltham
- 25: Waltham Center–Lexington Center via Lexington Street
- 32: Needham-Watertown (ex-Newton and Boston Street Railway)
- 36: Wayland–South Natick
- 41: Natick-Needham via Rt 135 through Wellesley (1912–1921)
