= Boston College station =

Light rail station in Boston, Massachusetts, US

Boston College
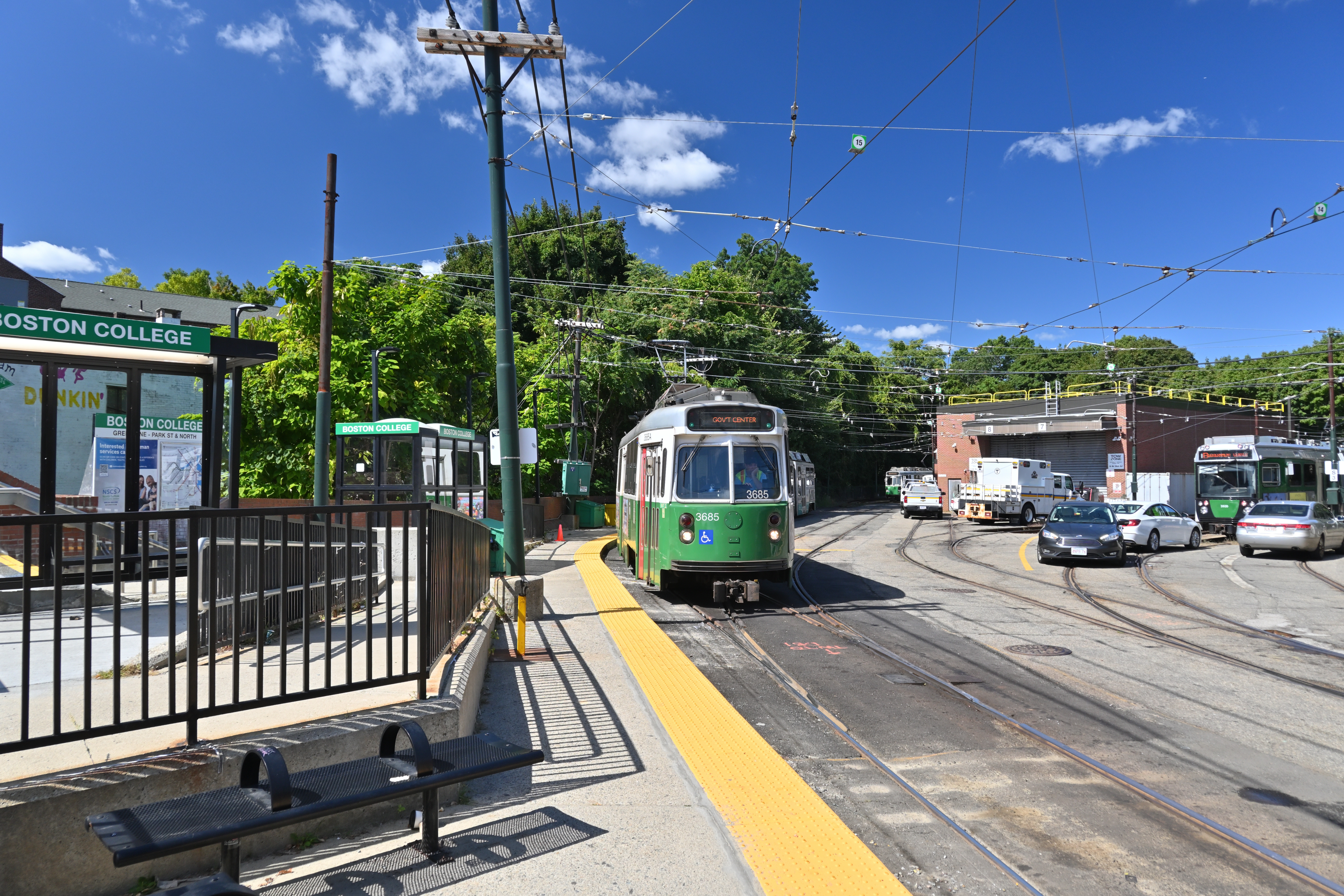
- An inbound train at Boston College station in 2024

General information
- Location: Commonwealth Avenue at Lake Street; Boston and Newton, Massachusetts
- Coordinates: 42.34022°N 71.16696°W
- Platforms: 2 side platforms
- Tracks: 1 balloon loop

Construction
- Accessible: Yes

History
- Opened: August 15, 1896
- Rebuilt: c. 1916, 1930, 2009
- Former names: Lake Street (until 1947)

Passengers
- 2011: 1,136 daily boardings

Services
Preceding station	MBTA	Following station
Terminus	Green Line B branch	South Street toward Government Center
Location

Boston College station is a light rail station on the MBTA Green Line B branch. It is located at St. Ignatius Square on the Boston College campus near the intersection of Commonwealth Avenue and Lake Street, on the border between the Brighton neighborhood of Boston and the Chestnut Hill neighborhood of Newton, Massachusetts. Originally opened in 1896, it has been the terminus of the Commonwealth Avenue line since 1900. The current station is planned to be replaced by a new station located in the median of Commonwealth Avenue just east of Lake Street.

== History ==
=== Original median station ===
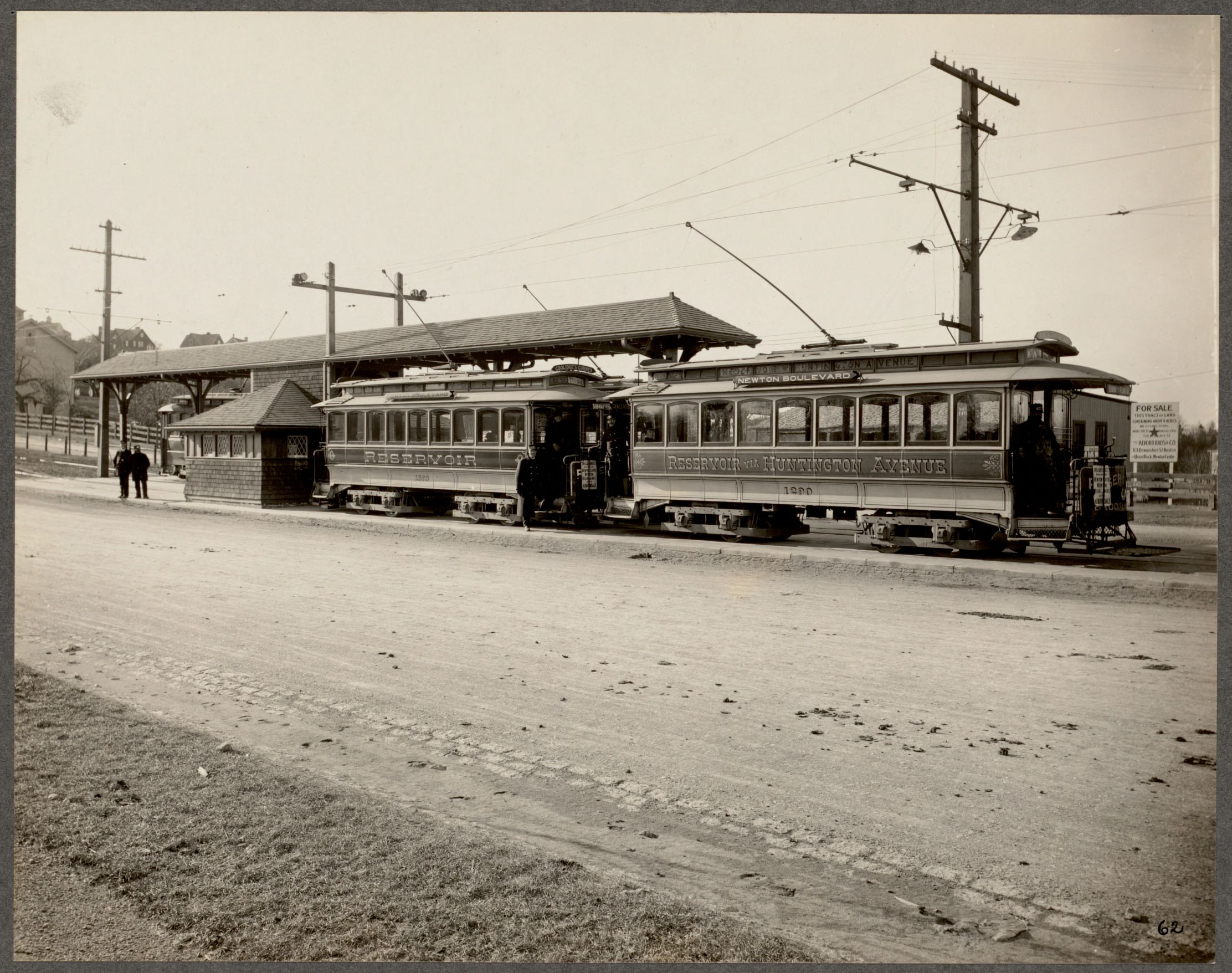
Boston Elevated Railway trams at Lake Street in March 1900

On August 15, 1896, the Boston Elevated Railway (BERy) added tracks on newly constructed Commonwealth Avenue from the Newton town line east to Chestnut Hill Avenue, where they were connected to the existing Beacon Street Line at Cleveland Circle. Except for rights to the Watertown Line inherited from the West End Street Railway, the BERy did not have operating rights in Newton. Instead, the Commonwealth Avenue Street Railway was built westward on the wide median of Commonwealth Avenue to Auburndale in 1895. It was soon taken over and operated by the Middlesex and Boston Street Railway (M&B). The two lines met at Lake Street station on the town line.

BERy cars from Lake Street began running into the Tremont Street subway via Beacon Street when the subway opened on September 1, 1897. On May 26, 1900, tracks on Commonwealth Avenue were completed from Chestnut Hill Avenue to Packards Corner, at which point Lake Street became the terminus of the Commonwealth Avenue line, which also ran into the subway. Except for occasional service disruptions due to track work or blockages on Commonwealth Avenue, Boston College has been the terminus of the Commonwealth Avenue line (B branch) since 1900.

=== Move to the north ===
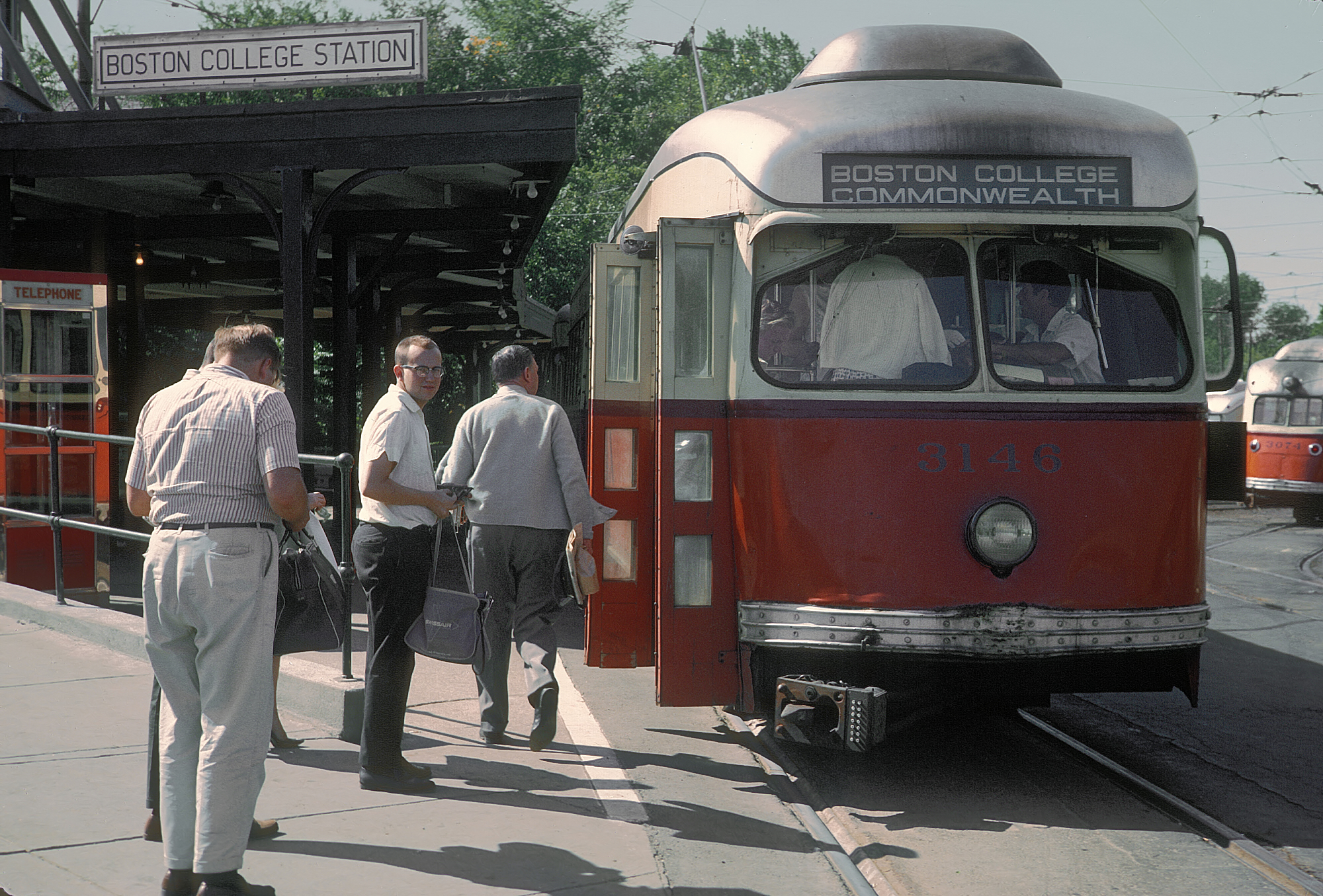
A train at the 1930-constructed platforms in 1965

Around 1916, the BERy constructed a pair of loops on the north side of Commonwealth Avenue just west of Lake Street; this allowed use of two-car motor-trailer trains on the line. On November 20, 1918, an out-of-service BERy streetcar rolled down a hill and destroyed the station, killing a waiting passenger.

Remaining M&B service on Commonwealth Avenue was replaced by buses in 1930, and the BERy no longer needed the old median station. The BERy built a storage yard on the site of the loops; a platform and waiting room in the yard opened on September 12, 1930. The M&B used a bus stop adjacent to the new inbound platform. The station was renamed to Boston College on May 21, 1947, by vote of the Boston Elevated Railway trustees after Boston College bought adjacent land for their Newton campus. Boston College station has not had MBTA bus connections since the 535 Lake Street–Auburndale route (the direct descendant of the Commonwealth Avenue Street Railway) was discontinued in 1976. (Boston College operates a system of private shuttle buses, but they stop on the campus rather than at the station.)

On May 23, 1979, the MBTA opened a new carhouse at the Lake Street yard. The carhouse provides light maintenance services to reduce the load on Reservoir and Riverside. In early 1980, the platforms were replaced; additional platforms were also constructed along the median east of Lake Street. Not a separate station, they were used when congestion in the yard (common with the introduction of the new Boeing LRVs) prevented trains from entering or exiting. The eastbound of these platforms, and a bus shelter on the westbound side, were removed during a 1980-81 renovation of the line. The westbound platform is still occasionally used when track work is being performed in the yard.

=== Proposed new station ===
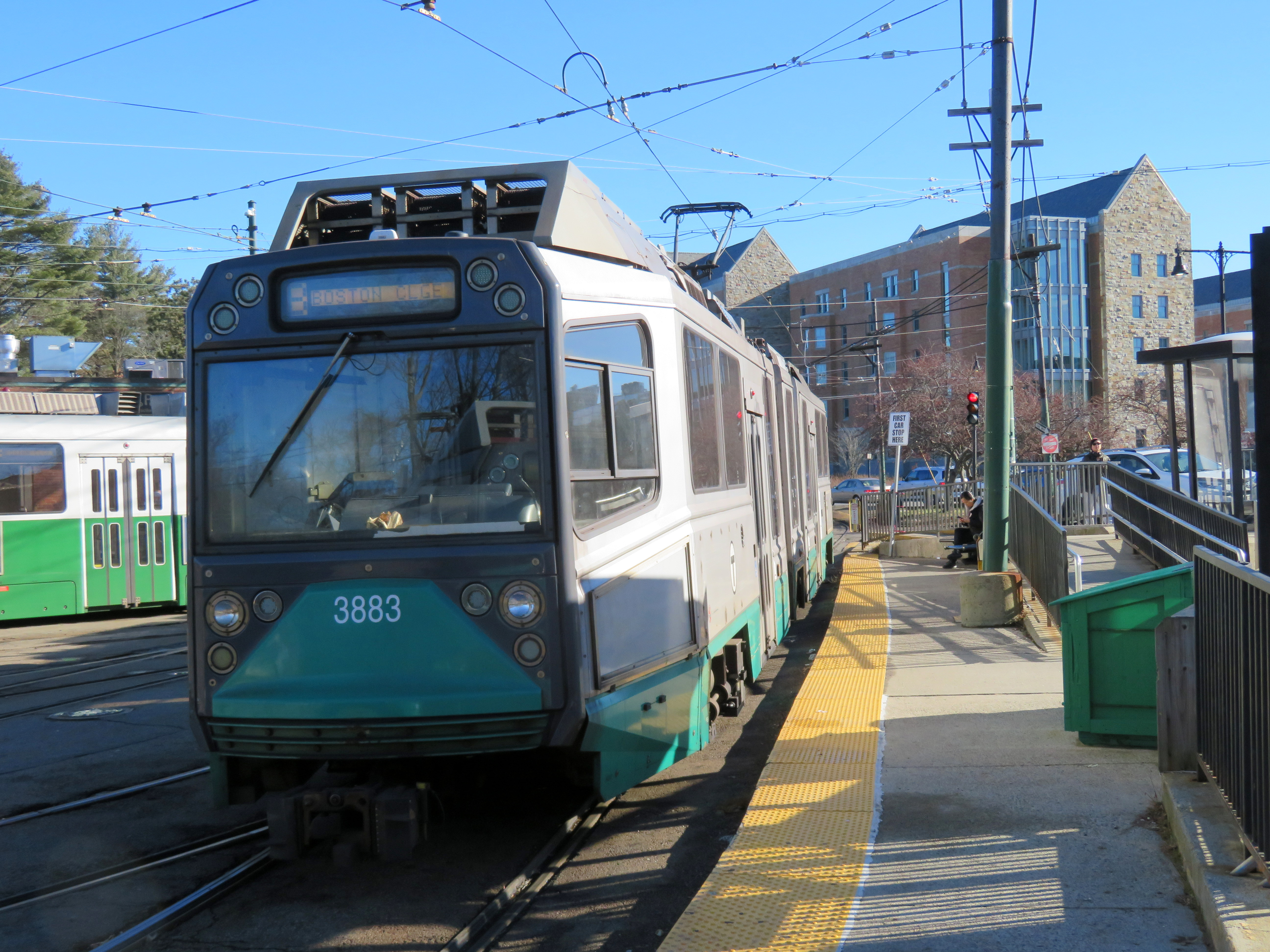
A train at the 2009-opened inbound platform

In the early 2000s, the MBTA modified key surface stops with raised platforms for accessibility as part of the Light Rail Accessibility Program. Portable lifts were installed at Boston College around 2000, along with a wooden mini-high platform (for level boarding on older Type 7 LRVs) on the inbound side. By 2005, the MBTA planned to relocate the station to the median of Commonwealth Avenue, just east of the Lake Street intersection. Boston College later agreed to aid the project financially and to donate land to widen Commonwealth Avenue to accommodate the station. New raised platform allowing level accessible boarding on newer low-floor Type 8 LRVs were completed on the existing site in 2009 at a cost of $296,000.

Planning continued for the relocated station. The project was advanced to 15% design by a $656,000 federal grant and $164,500 of MBTA funds. The design was advanced to the 30% level in November 2012 with an environmental review package completed the previous month. Once funds are made available, the new station was expected to take 24 months to construct at a cost of $20 million.

The new station was planned to have two side platforms, with a narrower platform between the tracks for passengers offloading from outbound trains and a wider platform with canopies for those waiting to board inbound trains. It would eliminate trains having to cross Commonwealth Avenue traffic to access the platforms, which would reduce moves across Commonwealth Avenue by 89%, though trains would still need to cross to access the yard. It was to have raised platforms for accessible boarding on newer low-floor LRVs and a ramp for accessible boarding on older high-floor LRVs.

A $29.3 million reconstruction and expansion of Lake Street Yard to support new Type 10 LRVs is planned for the late 2020s. A design shown in March 2024 called for the maintenance building to be removed, the yard tracks reconfigured, and a traction power substation added. Boston College station would be relocated to the median of Commonwealth Avenue, with a single island platform east of Lake Street. By November 2024, the station project was included with a larger set of station renovations on the line. However, it was later removed from that project.
