= Union Square station (Allston) =

Former streetcar stop in Allston, Boston

Union Square
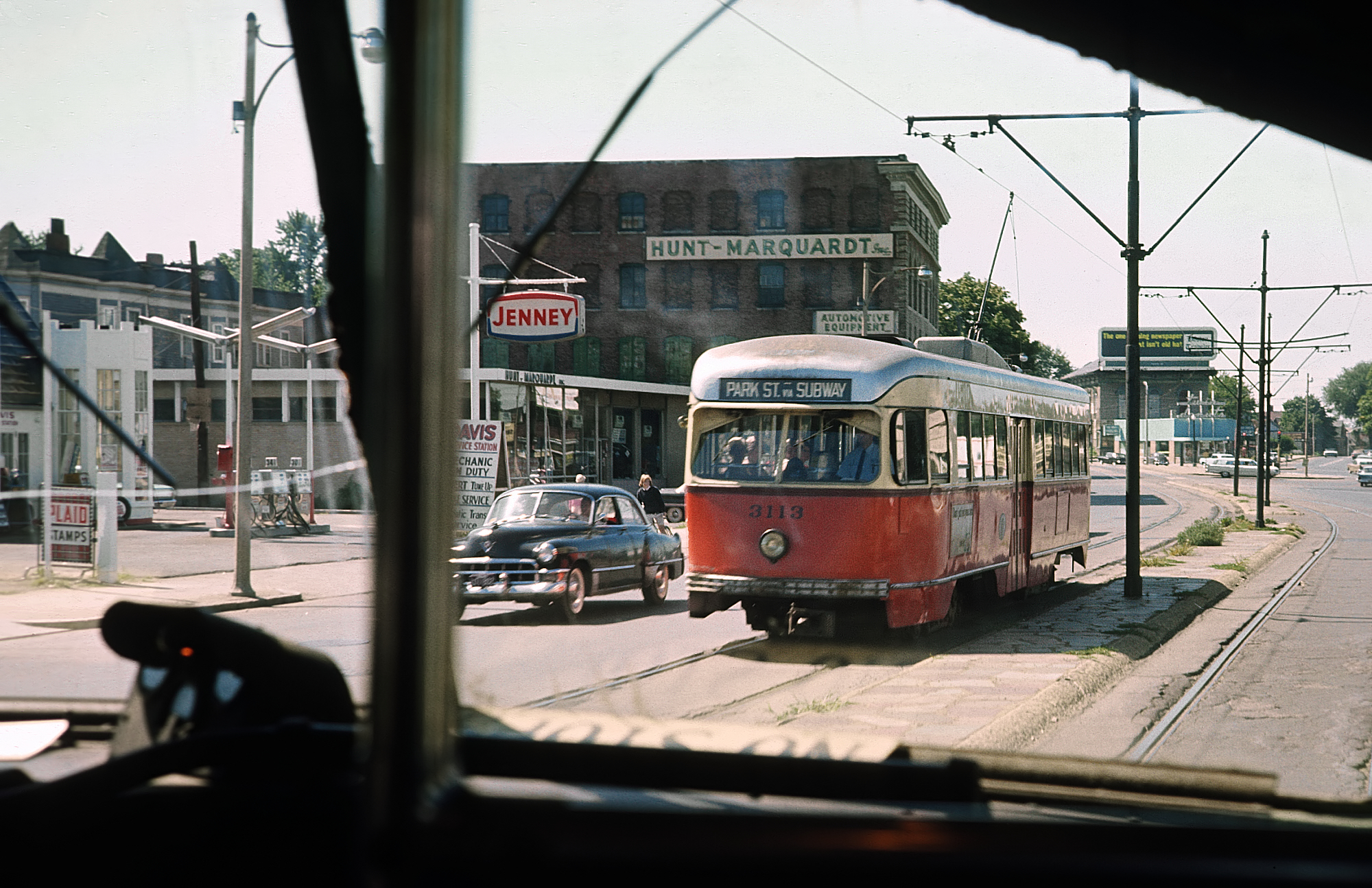
- An inbound streetcar at Union Square in 1965

General information
- Coordinates: 42°21′12.57″N 71°8′11.71″W
- Tracks: 2
- Connections: MBTA bus: 51, 57, 64, 66, 193, 501, 503

History
- Closed: June 21, 1969

Services
Preceding station	MBTA	Following station
Oak Square toward Watertown	Green Line A branch	Packards Corner toward Park Street
Location

Union Square station was a streetcar stop on the Green Line A branch located at Union Square in the Allston neighborhood of Boston, Massachusetts. It was closed in 1969 when service on the line was suspended and replaced by buses.

Union Square is now a transfer point between the 57 and 66 key bus routes; it is also served by route 64, express routes 501 and 503 on a limited number of trips, and the 51 and 193 on single daily trips.
