= Green Line A branch =

Former streetcar line in Massachusetts, US

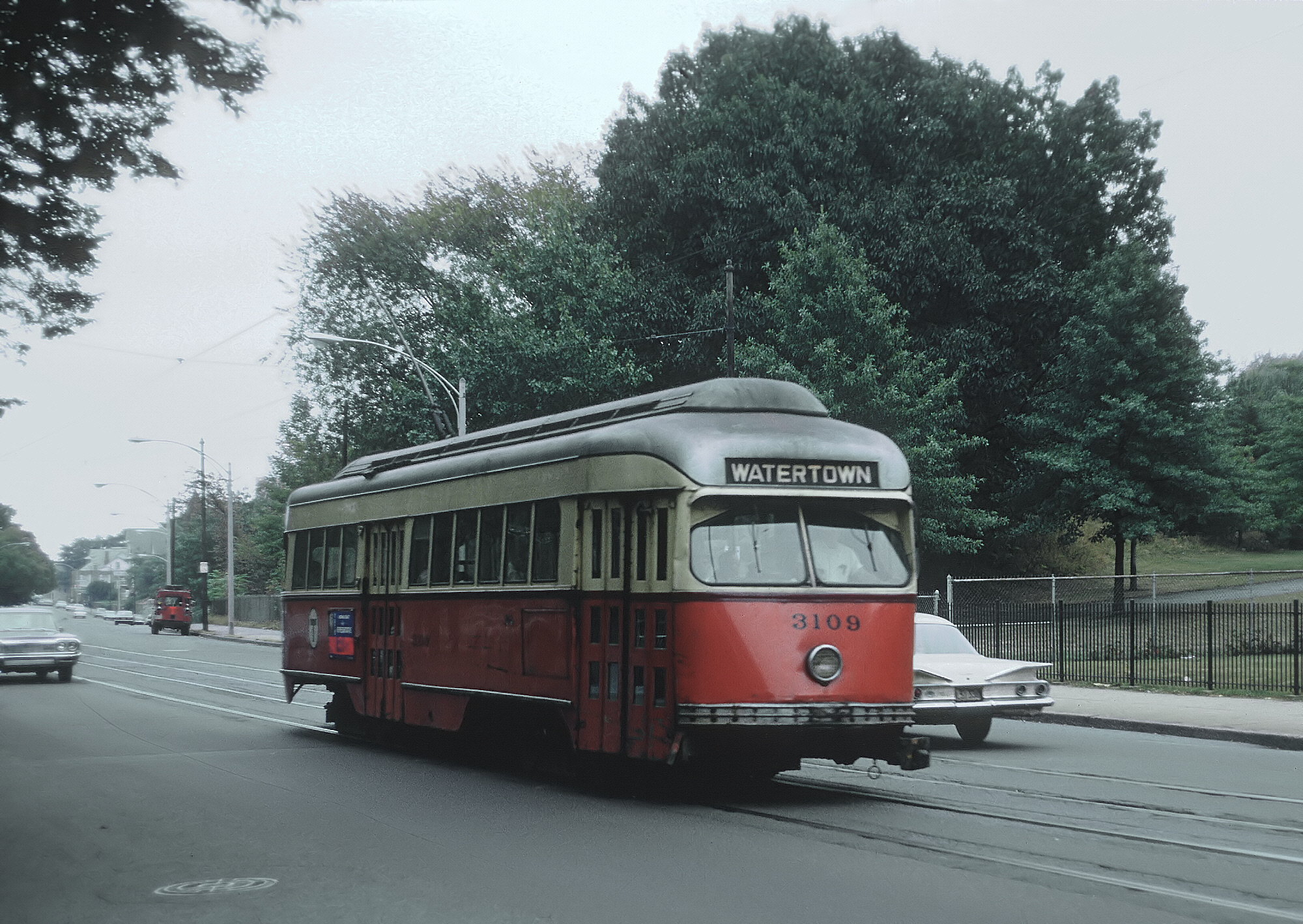
- An A branch streetcar on Cambridge Street in 1968

Overview
- Status: Abandoned
- Locale: Boston, Newton, and Watertown
- Termini: Park Street; Watertown Yard

Service
- Type: Light rail
- System: Green Line (MBTA subway)
- Operator: MBTA (at time of closure)
- Rolling stock: PCC streetcars (at time of closure)

History
- Closed: June 20, 1969

Technical
- Line length: 7.3 miles (11.7 km)
- Number of tracks: 2
- Track gauge: 4 ft 8 1/2 in (1,435 mm)

The A branch or Watertown Line was a streetcar line in the Boston, Massachusetts, area, operating as a branch of the Massachusetts Bay Transportation Authority Green Line. The line ran from Watertown through Newton Corner, Brighton, and Allston to Kenmore Square, then used the Boylston Street subway and Tremont Street subway to reach Park Street station.

Portions of the route were built as horsecar lines between 1858 and 1880. The segment between Union Square and Oak Square was electrified in 1889 as part of the Beacon Street line. By 1896, electric routes ran from Newton Corner (Nonantum Square) to downtown Boston via Brighton and via Watertown. Brighton service was extended to Watertown in 1912. The line was operated until 1969, when it was replaced by MBTA bus route 57, though it remained in service for non-revenue moves to Watertown Yard until 1994.

== History ==
=== Formation ===
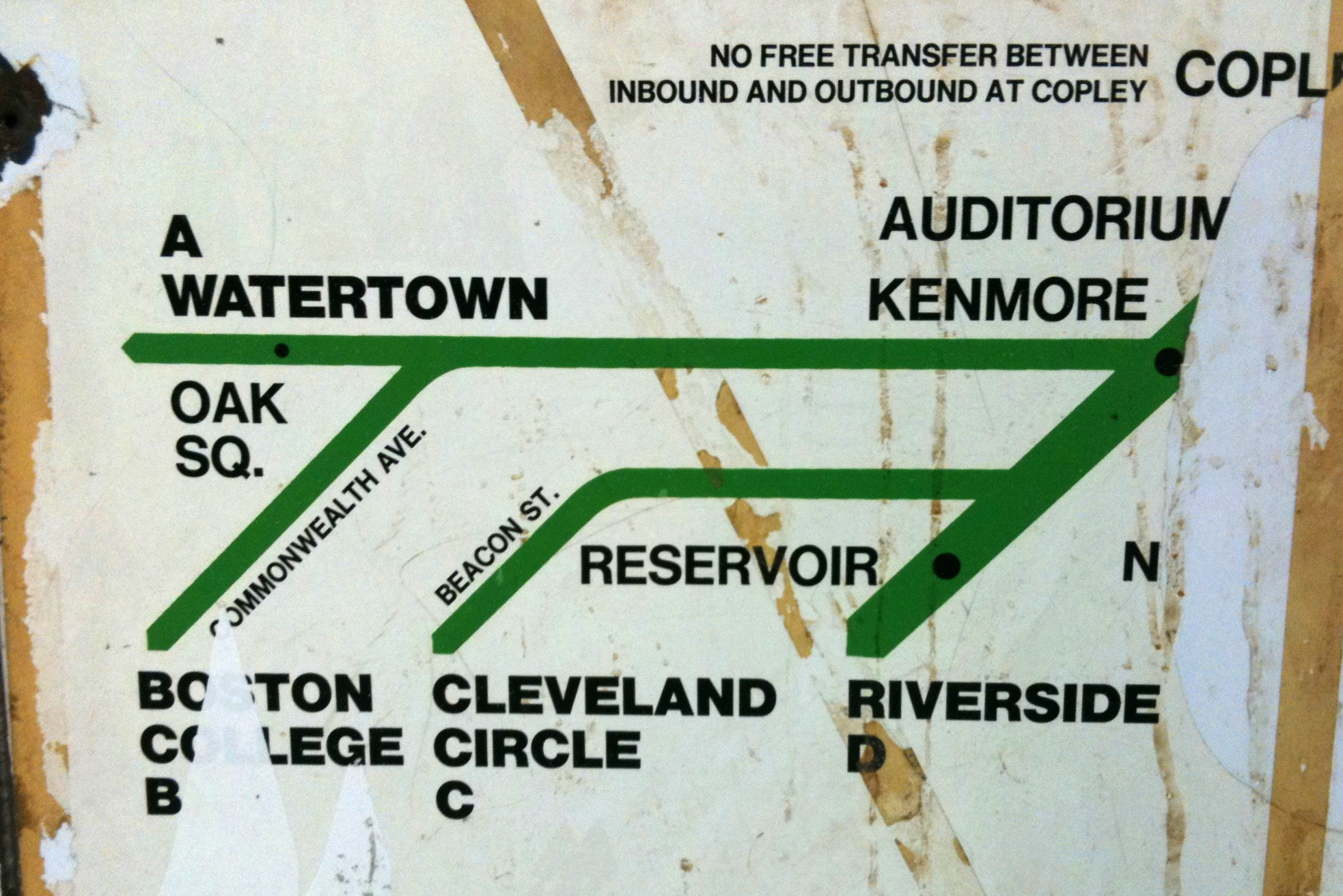
1967 map of branches of the newly named Green Line, showing the "A" branch

Construction of the Brighton Horse Railroad, a horse car street railway, began in 1858. The line began at Central Square, Cambridge, and crossed the Charles River on the River Street bridge into Allston. It continued through Union Square along Cambridge Street and Washington Street to Oak Square in the center of Brighton. The line was operated by the Union Street Railway, a holding company for the Cambridge Railroad system. After a dispute with the Boston and Worcester Railroad over the right to cross their tracks, the line opened on November 15, 1858. Service was doubled in April 1878, with cars operating every half hour. In 1880, the company opened a second Brighton–Cambridge line via Market Street and Western Avenue. A planned extension that year from Oak Square to Nonantum Square was not built, though a line from Watertown to Nonantum Square was.

In the late 1880s, the West End Street Railway consolidated the horse railroads, including the Cambridge Railroad, under its control. The West End opened its first electric streetcar line on January 3, 1889. The line ran between the Allston Carhouse (just north of Union Square) and Park Square via Harvard Street, Beacon Street, Massachusetts Avenue, and Boylston Street. Electric service was extended to Oak Square on January 13. Electric service between Watertown and Mount Auburn began on December 12, 1893; the line was double-tracked later in the decade. On August 18, 1896, the Western Avenue line was double-tracked and electrified. It was the last line that ran over the West Boston Bridge to be electrified; until then, its cars were hauled by horses to Central Square, then attached to electric cars from Allston for the remainder of the trip into Boston.

On May 18, 1896, tracks opened from Union Square east along North Beacon Street and Commonwealth Avenue to Kenmore Square, merging with the existing tracks on Beacon Street. On June 13, the western terminal was also extended to just shy of Newton Corner (Nonantum Square). On November 8, 1897, Newton service via Commonwealth Avenue began running into the Tremont Street subway. A lengthy Nonantum Square–City Point route via Allston, Coolidge Corner, and Park Square opened on August 4, 1900. On December 9, 1912, service was extended north to Watertown on the existing Galen Street tracks. During the early part of the 20th century, the line was also used for freight service.

The Boylston Street subway was opened to an incline in Kenmore Square on October 3, 1914, with Watertown service via Brighton Center immediately routed into the new tunnel. The first use of high-capacity center-entrance streetcars on the BERy system was as trailers on the Watertown Line in mid-1915. On February 23, 1922, Oak Square short turns were extended to Watertown in the evening peak hour. The Blandford Street portal, on Commonwealth Avenue west of Kenmore, opened October 23, 1932, marking the last change in the route of the service. In 1941, the line became the first line in Boston to have primary service with the new PCC streetcars, which replaced the Types 4 and 5 cars then in service.

=== North Beacon Street line ===
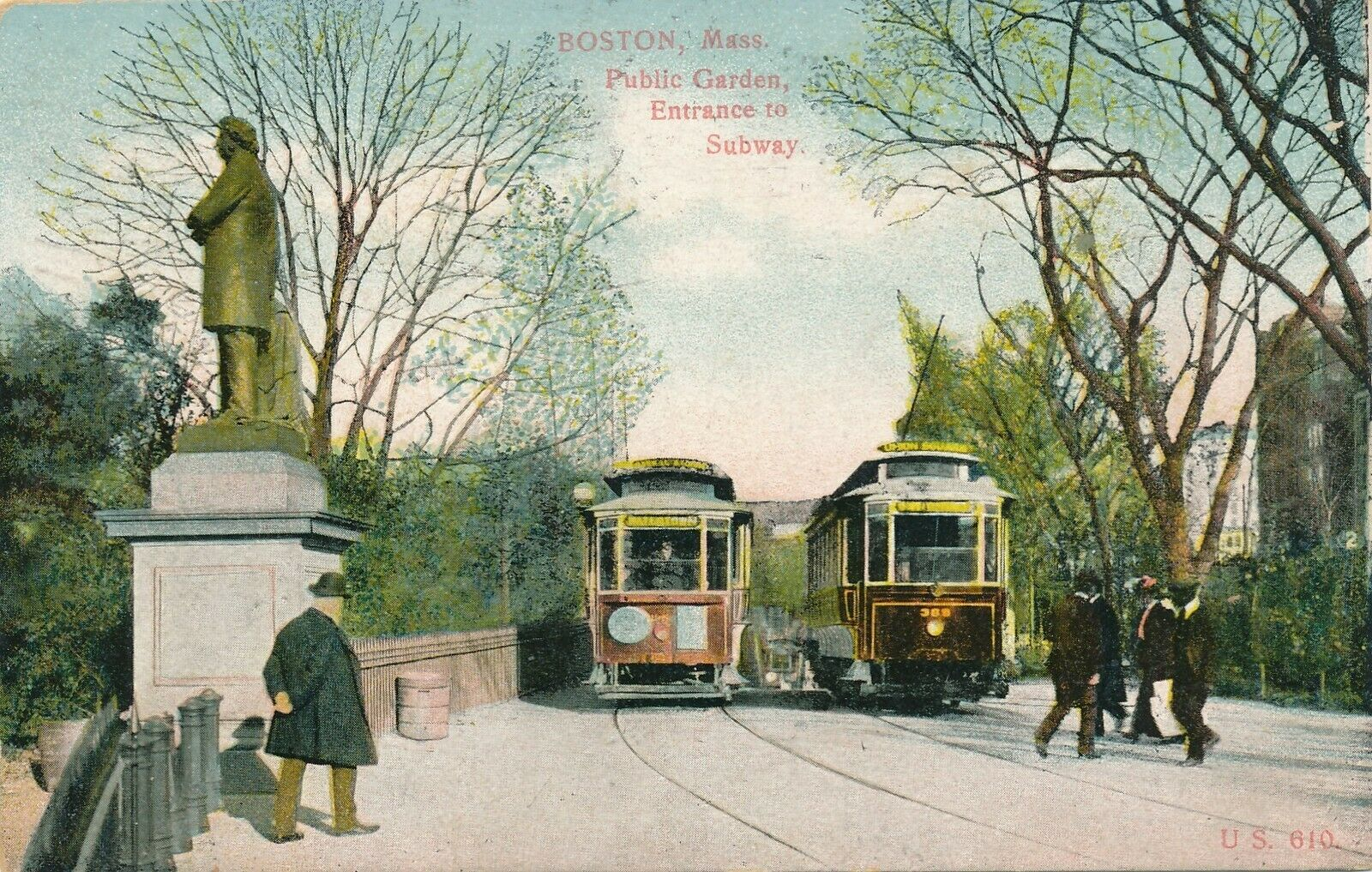
A 1910 postcard of two streetcars at the Public Garden incline. The left car is bound for Watertown via North Beacon Street; the right is bound for Park Street from Union Square.

In June 1894, the West End applied for city permission to construct a line on North Beacon Street between Union Square and the Watertown border. The Newtonville and Watertown Street Railway soon secured position to build between Watertown Square and Union Square, with the intention to use the West End tracks to reach downtown Boston. After approval by the Watertown Arsenal (which owned a section of North Beacon Street) in 1896 – despite the objection of the West End – the company constructed the line in 1898.

After further disagreements between its parent company Newton and Boston Street Railway and the BERy about operations, the line opened in 1900. Through service on the line between Watertown and the Tremont Street subway, acting as a branch of the Newton-Brighton line, began on November 18, 1900. The BERy took over the line from the Newton and Boston in 1907. The portion west of Market Street was among the only BERy lines never to be double-tracked.

The Newton Street Railway (later the Middlesex and Boston Street Railway) began Waltham–Park Street service via the North Beacon Street line on February 23, 1903. This service was rerouted to Central Square on April 27, 1912, running on Arsenal Street and Western Avenue rather than North Beacon Street. Oak Square–Boston service via Western Avenue was also cut to an Oak Square–Central Square route, and later to a Union Square–Central Square route. Watertown–Park Street service via North Beacon Street remained. Upon the opening of the Boylston Street subway in October 1914, North Beacon Street service was cut to a Watertown–Union Square shuttle. It was further cut to a North Beacon Street bridge (the Brighton/Watertown line) – Union Square shuttle on June 2, 1917.

The North Beacon Street shuttle was replaced with a bus route on February 23, 1922. A Watertown–Arsenal Street bridge bus route, which ran on North Beacon between Watertown and School Street, was briefly run in 1925–26. The Central Square–Union Square line was rerouted via Western Avenue and Soldiers Field Road on December 14, 1925, with a new bus route on River Street. The bus route was extended to Union Square on September 11, 1926, replacing the streetcar line. The two bus routes were combined in February 1933 to eliminate the transfer; the route is now the route 64 bus.

=== Closure ===
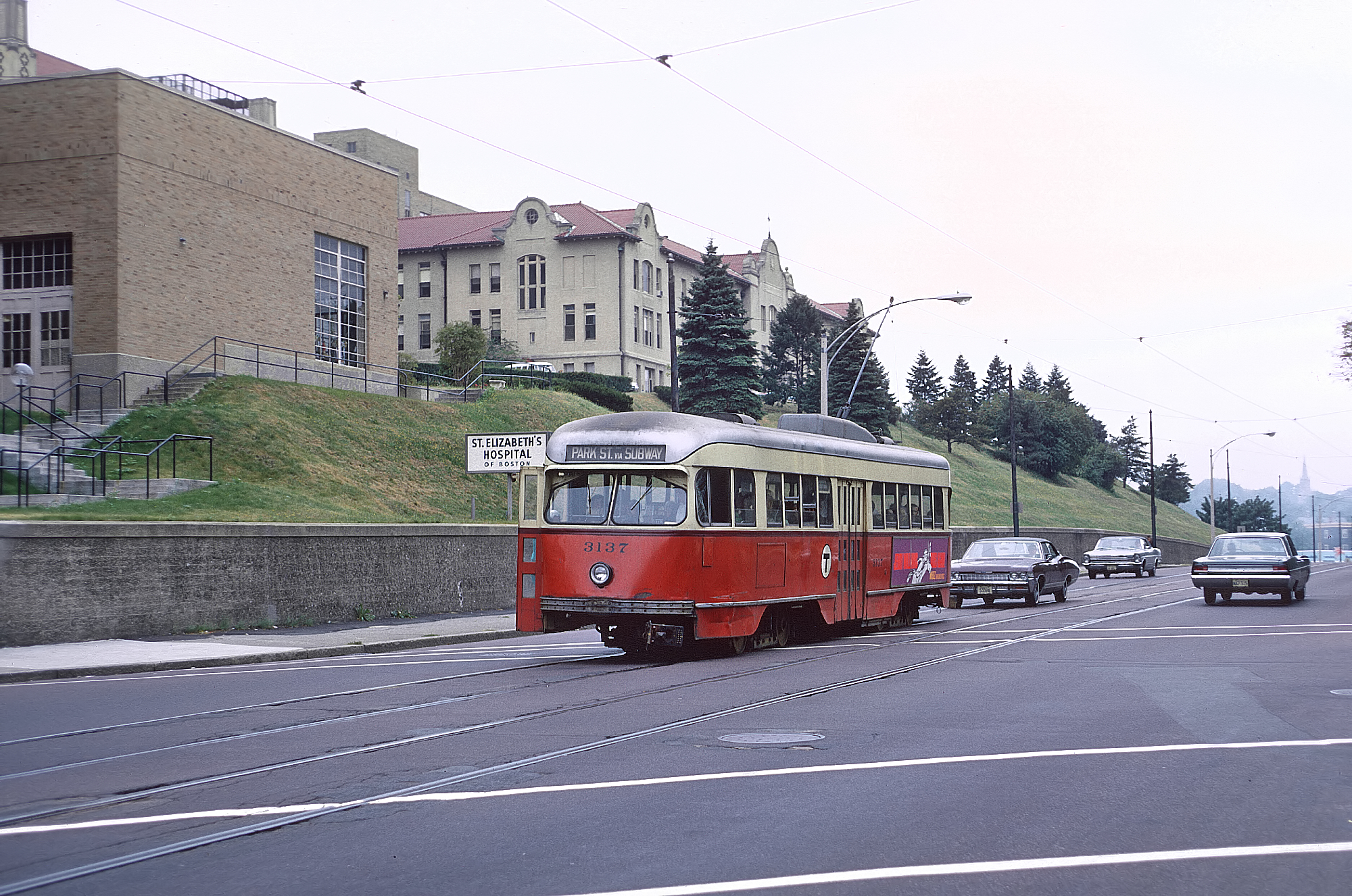
The A branch ran in mixed traffic for much of its length, causing it to be slow and unreliable.

Prior to 1967, when the current letters were assigned to the Green Line's branches, the Watertown Line was route 69. (Route 57, the line's current number, was originally assigned to Heath Street short-turn trips on the Huntington Avenue line.) The line was assigned the letter "A" because it was the northernmost branch. Turnback loops existed at Union Square (via Cambridge Street and Harvard Avenue) and Oak Square, as well as the Watertown terminal. Additionally, from 1915 to January 15, 1962, a loop existed at Braves Field, for special events along the part of the line concurrent with the Commonwealth Avenue line.

Brighton Avenue originally had a dedicated streetcar reservation between Union Square and Packards Corner. It was replaced with street trackage, which allowed private autos to share the lane, with construction lasting from July 1 to October 7, 1949.

The opening of the Riverside Line in 1959 caused streetcar lines in Cambridge running out of Harvard Square to be converted to trackless trolley, and the newly freed PCC streetcars were reassigned to the Riverside branch. However, the 1940s-era PCC fleet was aging, and maintaining five different types of PCCs complicated mechanical work. By the late 1960s, wear and tear and a lack of replacements caused a shortage of Green Line streetcars, and the MBTA announced the closure of the A branch on a "trial" basis.

The A branch was chosen for closure because much of its route consisted of street running sections from Watertown to Packards Corner, and in 1964 there had been objections to keeping the service past Newton Corner. Streetcars last ran on June 20, 1969, with the route 57 bus beginning the next day.

=== Track removal ===
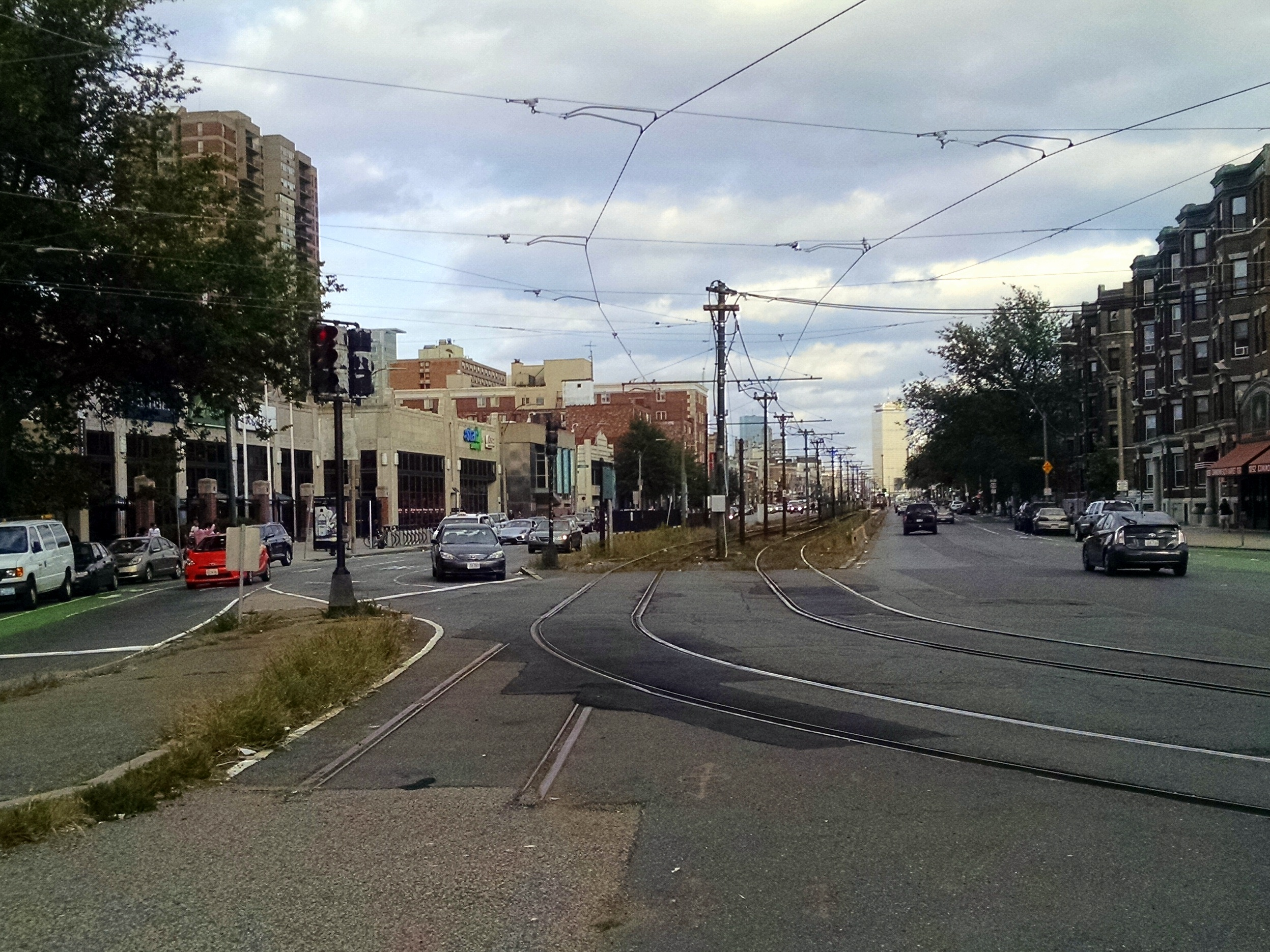
Former stub remains of A branch tracks at Packards Corner. The switch was disconnected in 2014 and paved over in 2020.

The legacy tracks remained after 1969, being used for several decades to allow Green Line streetcars to reach the Watertown Carhouse for maintenance. The last use of the line was in 1993, when the fleet of PCC streetcars used for the Ashmont–Mattapan High-Speed Line was refurbished at the Watertown carhouse. The electrified overhead wire was finally removed in March 1994.

Additional overhead infrastructure, as well as the tracks themselves, were mainly removed by the end of the summer of 1996 as part of a resurfacing project on North Beacon Street. Remnants of the tracks are still visible today in the Watertown Yard bus terminal (no longer used for railcar maintenance), and formerly as a short stub track at Packard's Corner, where the "A" branch used to diverge from the "B" branch. The stub, part of the former outbound track, was used for temporarily storing disabled trains until it was shorted to just a few feet long in the mid 2000s; the switch was not disconnected until 2014 and not paved over until 2020.

Restoration of the "A" branch was advocated to provide a one-seat ride to downtown Boston from the northern corridor (rather than requiring a transfer at Kenmore), but was ruled too costly and less safe compared to the replacement bus service.

=== Bus routes ===
==== Route 57 ====
57
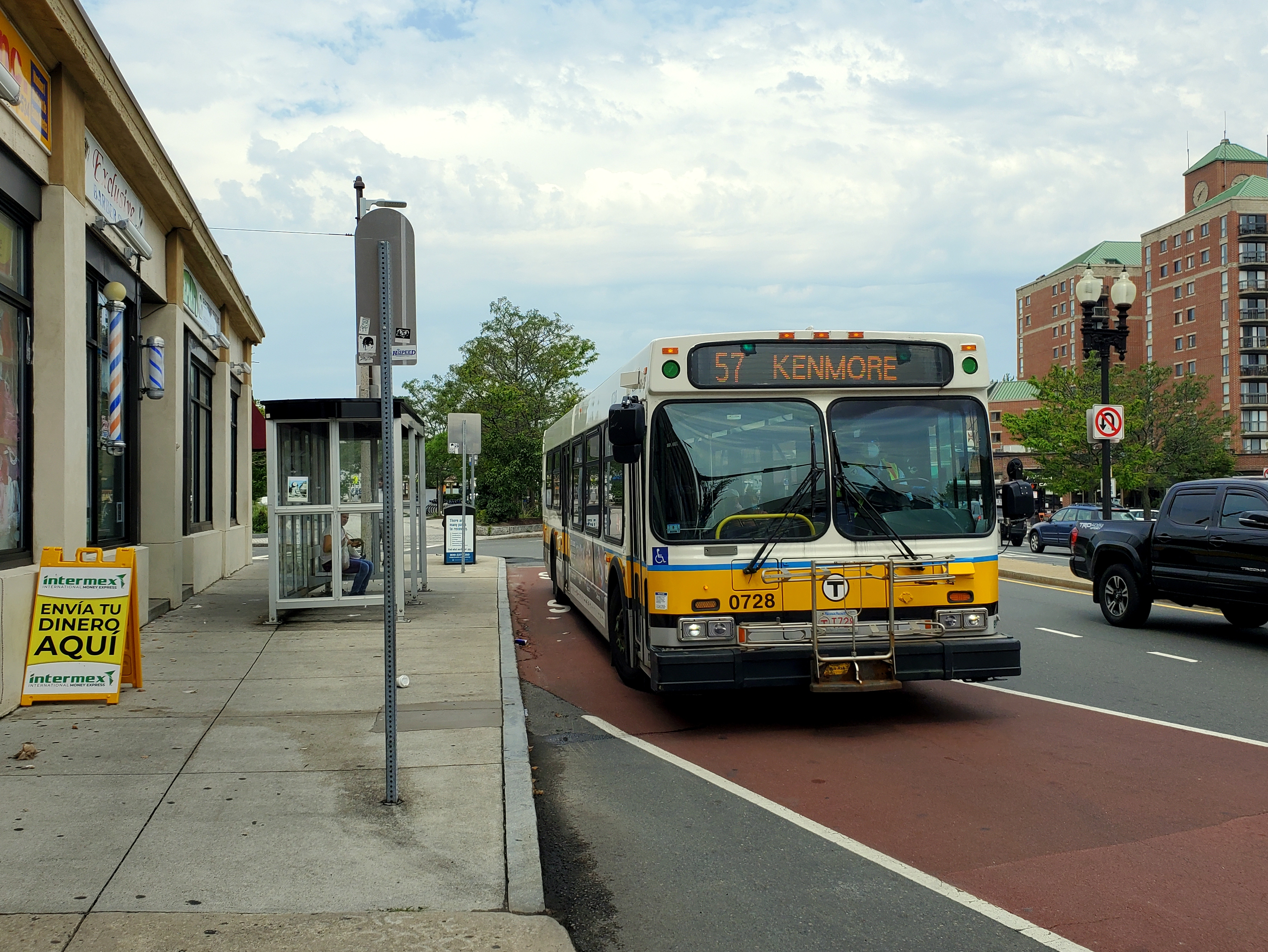
- A route 57 bus at Union Square, Allston, in July 2021

Overview
- System: MBTA bus
- Garage: Albany Street Garage

Route
- Locale: Boston, Newton, and Watertown, Massachusetts
- Start: Watertown Yard
- End: Kenmore station
- Length: 5.8 miles (9.3 km) eastbound 5.4 miles (8.7 km) westbound
- Daily ridership: 10,560 (2018)

The 57 Watertown Yard–Kenmore station bus was initiated in 1969 as replacement service for the A branch. The 57 follows the same routing from Watertown Yard to Kenmore except for the Newton Corner rotary, where inbound buses follow traffic rather than operating in a counterflow lane as streetcars had. As a way to make the service more attractive, the MBTA originally had the 57 operate as a limited (boarding-only outbound and dropoff-only inbound) between Packards Corner and Kenmore, with the "B" branch providing local service along Commonwealth Avenue. In December 2006 the 57 began making local stops on Commonwealth.

Since free transfers had been previously eliminated by the M.T.A. in October 1961, Watertown riders had to pay a double fare to continue downtown after the bustitution. This continued until January 1, 2007, when a new fare structure added free transfers when using a CharlieCard.

Additional short turn trips between Oak Square and Kenmore at rush hour were cut in June 1971, and restored for mornings only in 1987. Morning-only Brighton Center–Kenmore trips were operated from September 1999 to June 2013. On September 1, 2008, due to overcrowding on the inner part of the route, the MBTA began operating the 57A Oak Square–Kenmore station short turn of the 57 during weekday rush hours. Approximately every other trip operated as a 57A during rush hours; during off-peak hours and weekends all buses ran the full-length route. Oak Square short turn service was discontinued in December 2020 except for a small number of school-day trips; frequency on the full route was increased.

Route 57 operates as a busy key bus route, with headways between 10 and 12 minutes at all times (and equal headways on the 57A during peaks). As of 2012, the 57 and 57A combined were ninth-busiest route on the MBTA system, with 10,094 boardings on an average weekday. Route 57 is based at the Albany Street Bus Facility during weekday rush hours and midday service, and is based at the Cabot Garage for evening, weekend, and holiday service. One early-morning round trip, intended for MBTA employees but open to the public, continues to Haymarket. It was inaugurated along with several other routes by the M.T.A. in September 1960, though they were not listed in public timetables until September 1999. The trip is internally called route 193, but is shown on public timetables as a route 57 trip.

A 2018–19 MBTA review of its bus system found that route 57 suffered from overcrowding at peak hours and poor reliability. No short-term changes were recommended. 2022 MBTA proposals for its systemwide bus network redesign called for the 57 to have increased frequency to provide service every 15 minutes or better at all operating hours. 57A short turn service was reintroduced in December 2024 but dropped in April 2025. Evening service was extended about one hour later effective August 24, 2025. Effective December 14, 2025, route 57 is scheduled to operate every 15 minutes or less during normal service hours.

==== Express buses ====
Express buses to Downtown Boston via Copley Square

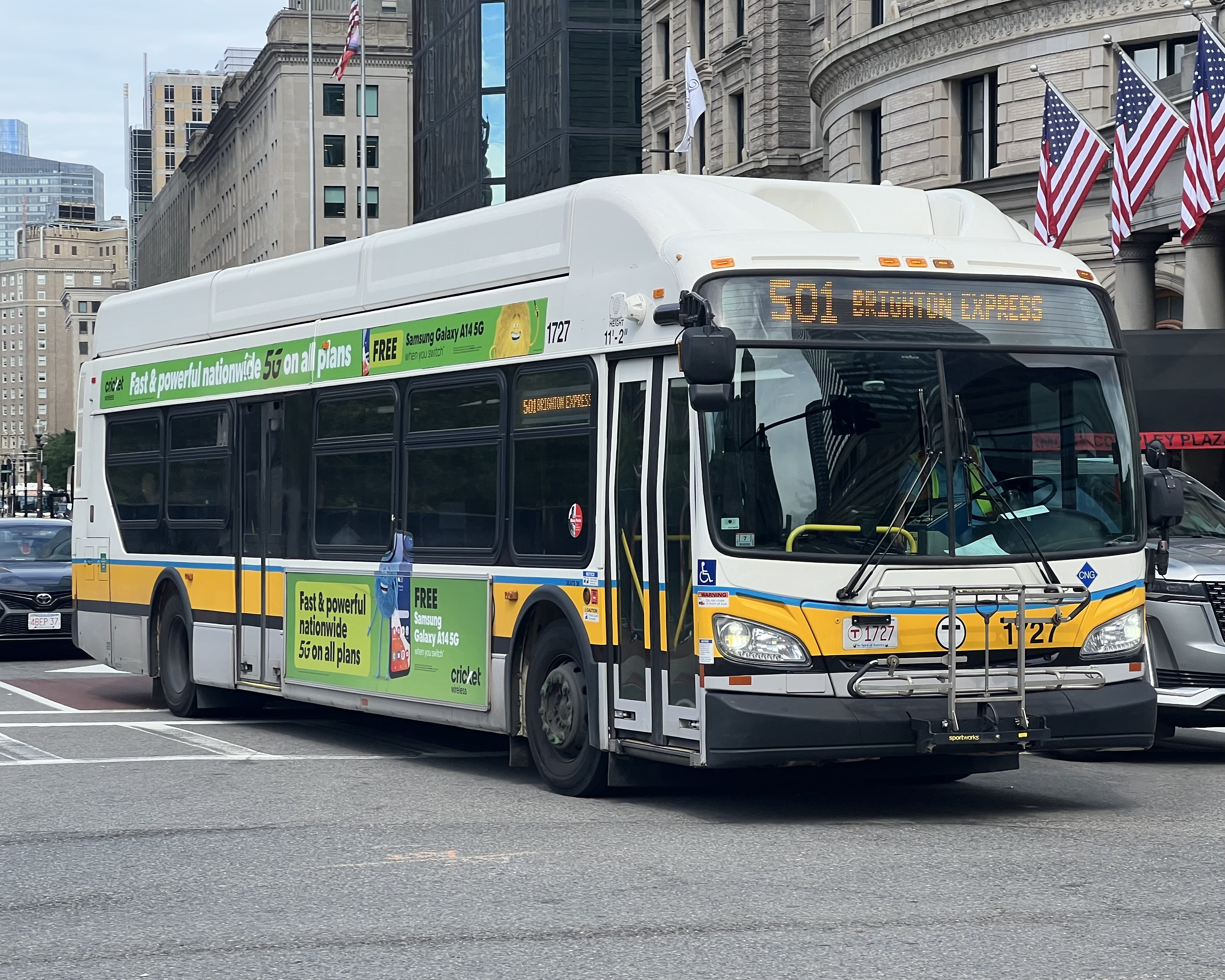
The 501 serves the Brighton neighborhood

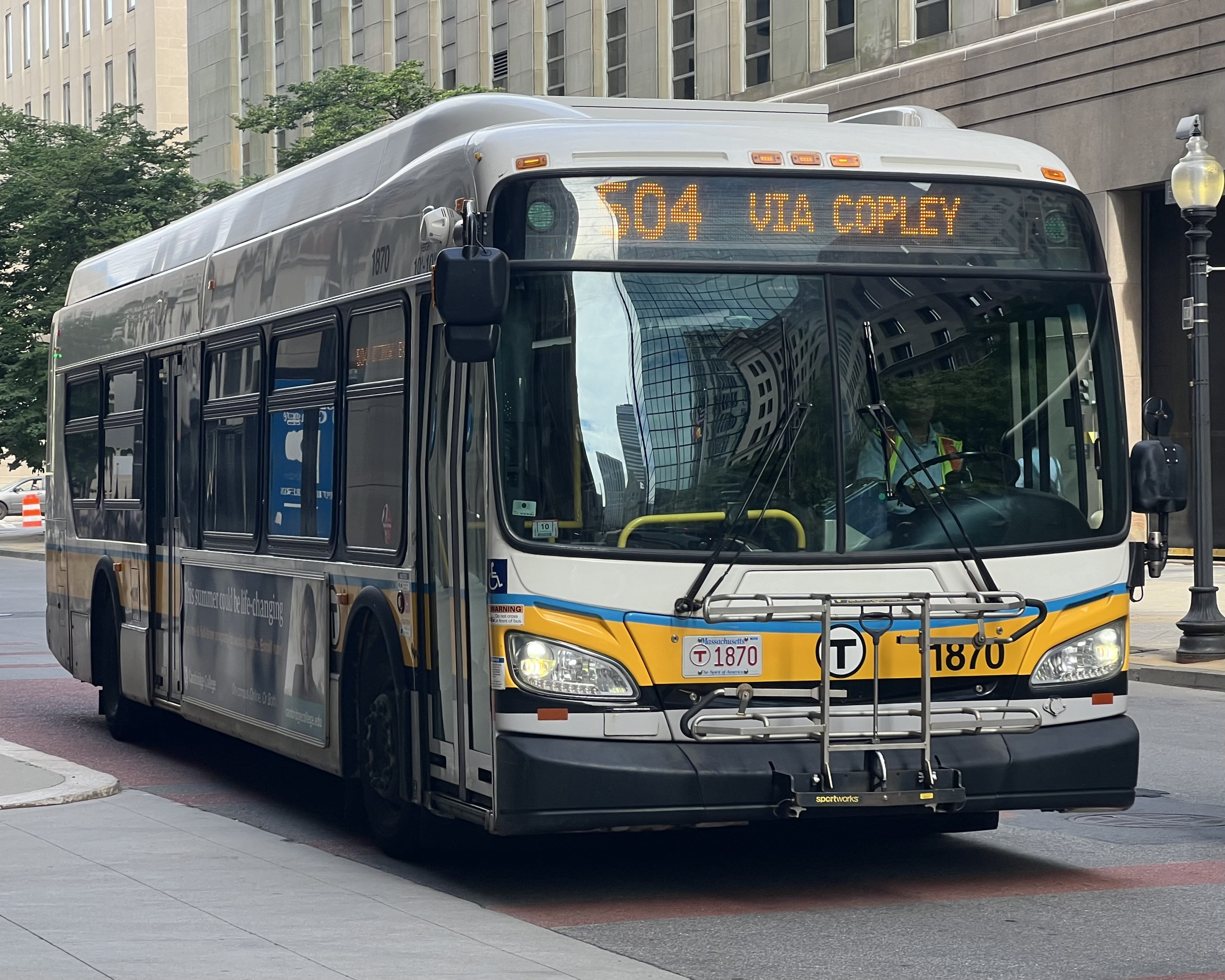
The 504 serves Watertown and Newton Corner

The portion of the route west of Brighton Center is also served by two express routes, which operate to downtown Boston via Copley Square:

- 501 Brighton Center–Federal Street & Franklin Street
- 504 Watertown Yard–Federal Street & Franklin Street

Express bus service from Brighton and Watertown began even while the "A" branch was still running. The 61 Watertown/Newton Corner-Downtown Boston via Mass. Turnpike route began in July 1967, with Saturday service added in March 1968. In December 1967, the 61 was renumbered as 4, and a new route 61 running from Oak Square to downtown via Brighton Center and Union Square, Boston and the Turnpike was initiated. In September 1968, the 61 was changed to originate at Brighton Center, from where it ran through Oak Square and entered the Turnpike at Newton Corner. Route 62 Watertown-Copley was started at the same time.

In June 1970, the routes were renumbered from 4, 61, and 62 to 304, 301, and 302 to reflect their express routings. (The 300-series numbers had been used by ex-Eastern Massachusetts Street Railway bus routes in Lawrence, briefly under MBTA control, in 1968). In March 1974, route 301 buses operating opposite the peak direction began using the pre-1968 routing on Cambridge Street. Inbound morning buses reverted to the Newton Corner routing in June 1974, but outbound afternoon buses continued to travel via Union Square. Some afternoon buses switched back to the Cambridge Street route in September 1976 and September 1978.

All three routes had a number of minor changes to their downtown and Copley Square routings in the late 1970s and 1980s. Midday and Saturday service on the 302 began in January 1983; in December 1989, the midday and Saturday buses added a Copley Square stop as route 304 Watertown-Downtown via Copley. In September 1996, the routes were renumbered as the 501, 502, and 504. In January 2005, the 503 Brighton Center–Copley Square route was inaugurated. Inbound route 503 afternoon trips began operating via Cambridge Street in March 2014; route 501 followed suit in March 2019.

The 2018–19 system review found that routes 501 and 503 had too-close stop spacing on the outer section of the route, inconsistent afternoon peak schedules, and poor reliability. No major issues were found with routes 502 and 504. The MBTA recommended that outbound route 502 and 504 buses operate directly to Galen Street, rather than looping the Newton Corner rotary to serve those stops. This was implemented on September 1, 2019; outbound route 501 and 503 buses began serving the Newton Corner stops at that time.

Most MBTA service began operating on Saturday schedules on March 17, 2020, due to the COVID-19 pandemic. Weekday-only routes 502 and 503 were suspended, while routes 501 and 504 operated on reduced schedules. Route 504 began operating via Copley on most trips – operating on surface streets between Copley Square and downtown Boston – to replace route 502. It also resumed looping around Newton Corner on outbound trips. Route 501 was suspended from June 2020 to August 31, 2020; upon its return, it began serving Copley Square as well. The May 2022 network proposals called for the 2020 changes to be made permanent, and for routes 501 and 504 to only operate at weekday peak hours. A November 2022 revision re-added midday service on route 504.
