= Watertown Yard =

Bus terminal in Massachusetts, US

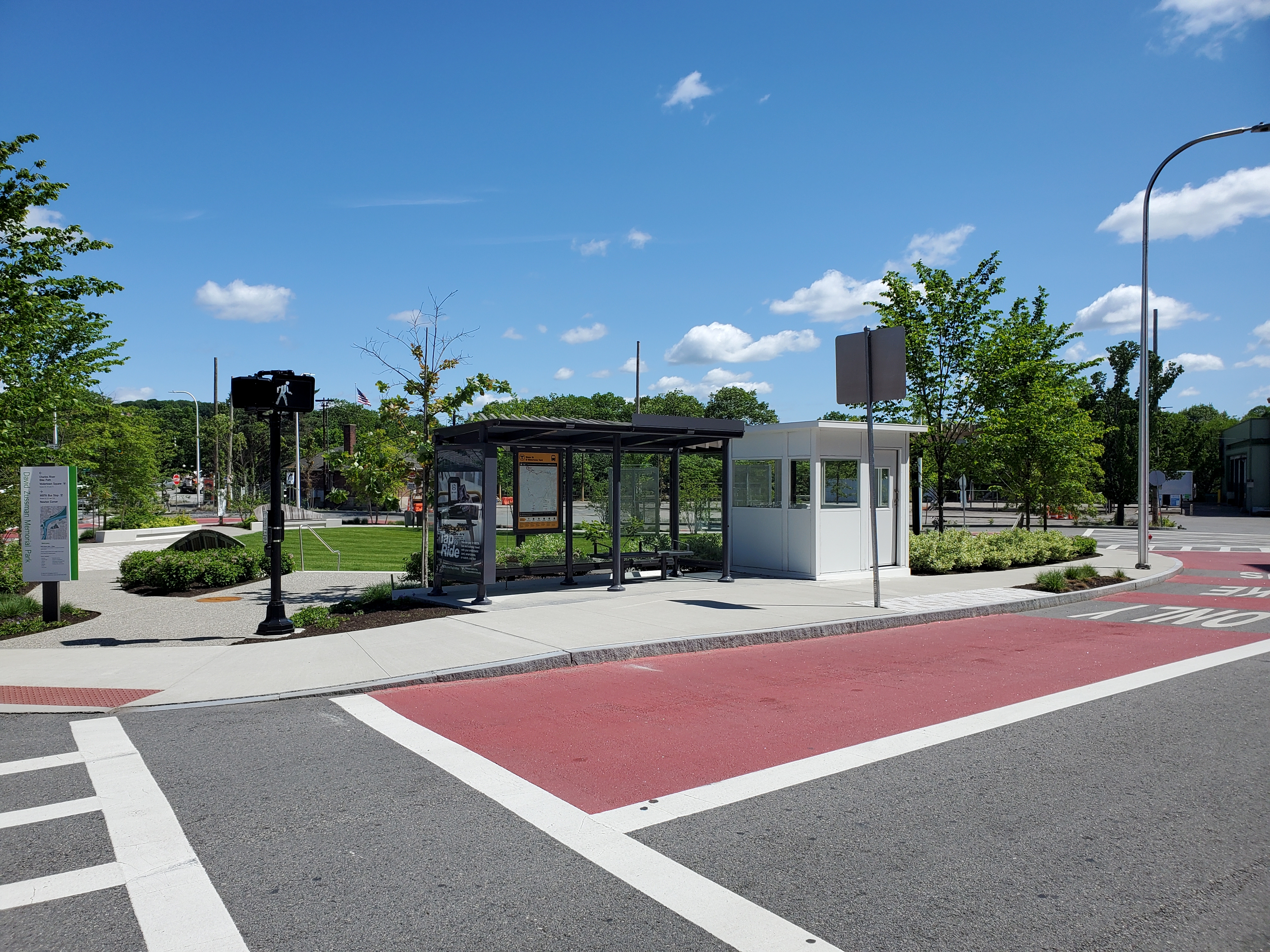
- Watertown Yard bus stop in 2025

General information
- Coordinates: 42°21′51.45″N 71°11′7.96″W
- Owner: Massachusetts Bay Transportation Authority
- Platforms: 1 side platform (for buses)
- Tracks: 2 (former)
- Connections: MBTA bus: 52, 57, 504; Watertown Connector

Construction
- Parking: 164 spaces

History
- Closed: June 21, 1969 (Green Line)

Former services
Preceding station	MBTA	Following station
Terminus	Green Line A branch	Newton Corner toward Park Street
Location

Watertown Carhouse is a bus maintenance facility and former streetcar carhouse located in the southern section of Watertown, Massachusetts, across the Charles River from Watertown Square. As Watertown Yard, the site also serves as a bus depot serving local and express routes 52, 57, and 504, with additional connections available at Watertown Square station on the opposite end of the Watertown Bridge. The yard parking lot is available as commuter parking for riders.

== History ==
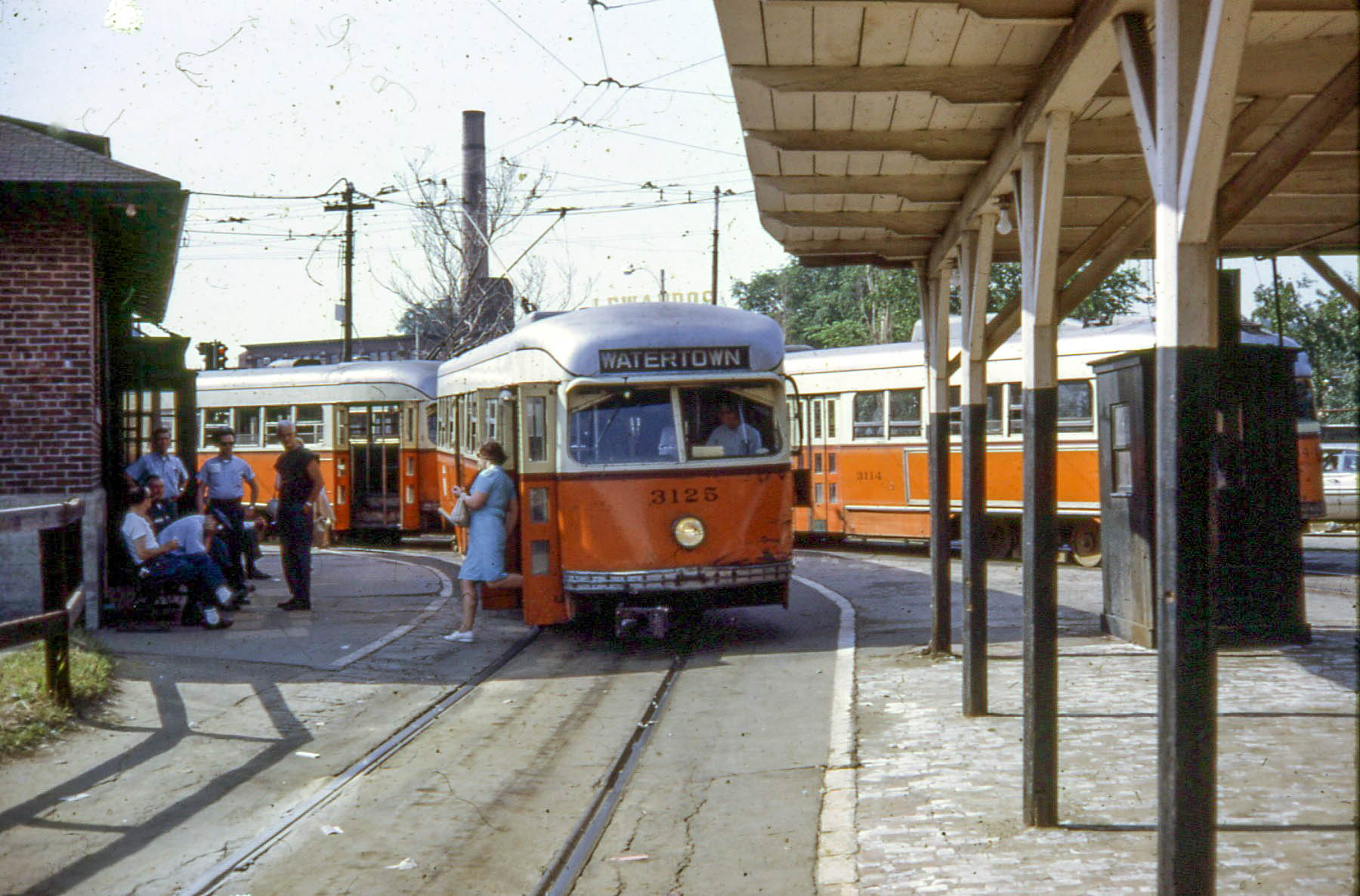
An outbound train arrives at Watertown in 1967

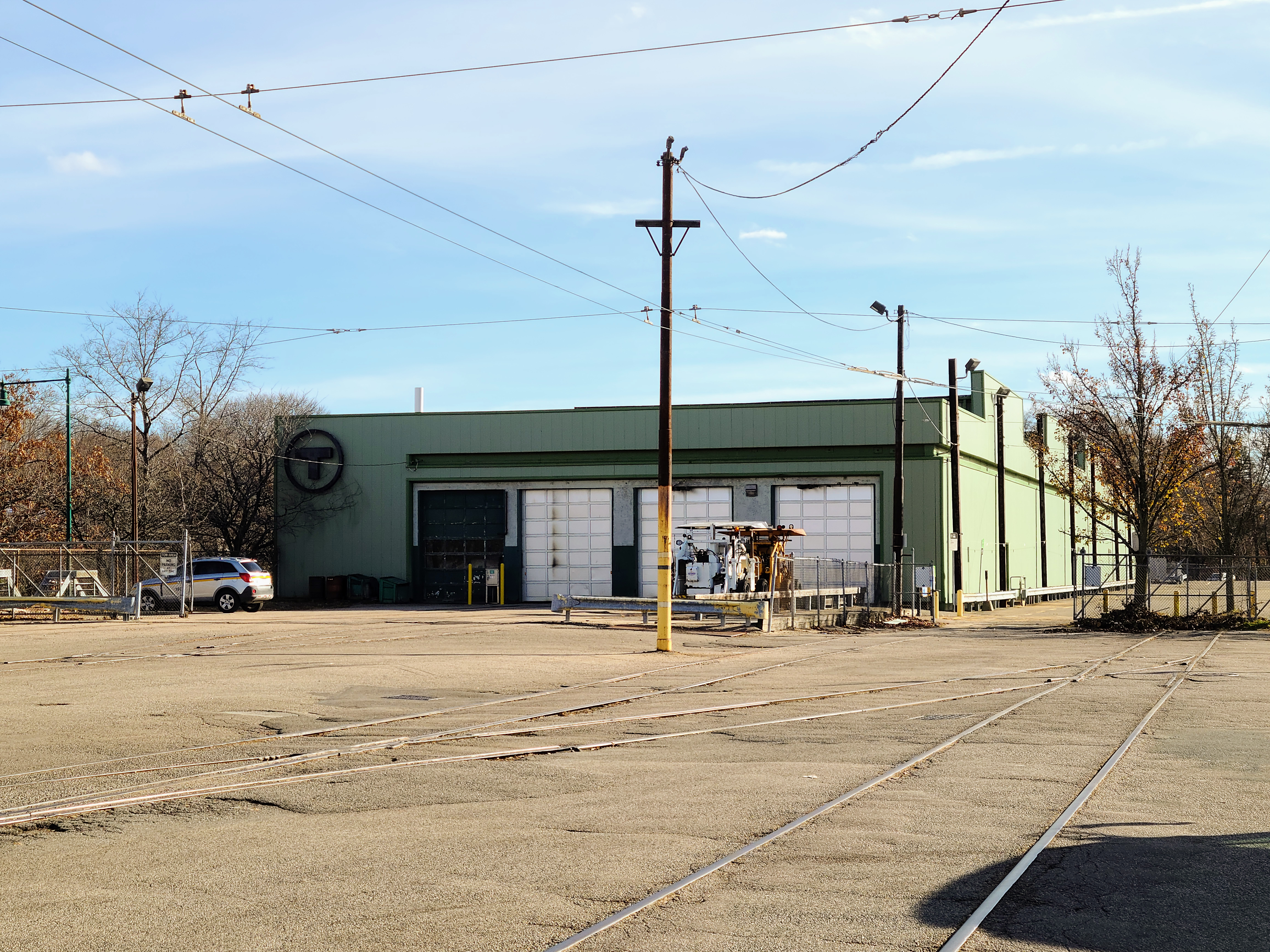
Watertown Carhouse in 2021

In 1900, streetcar service was extended south from Watertown Square to Newton Corner, which served as a transfer point between the Boston Elevated Railway (BERy) and suburban operators. In 1912, the Watertown Line was created by extending the Newton Corner line along these tracks to a new transfer facility, yard, and maintenance facility, Watertown Yard.

Watertown Yard formerly served as the terminus of the Green Line A branch, with its heavy maintenance shops eventually handling most work for the remaining trolley routes by the 1950s. When the D branch opened in 1959, the Riverside shops were opened to supplement the Watertown and Reservoir carhouses. Due to a rolling stock shortage created largely by the opening of the D branch, as well as traffic problems at the poorly designed Newton Corner rotary, the A branch was closed in 1969 and replaced by the route 57 bus. However, Watertown Carhouse continued to see frequent use.

The Bennett Street Carhouse near Harvard Square was closed in the 1970s for construction of the Harvard Kennedy School. On February 22, 1974, the MBTA began conversion of Watertown Carhouse to a trolleybus and streetcar maintenance facility to replace Bennett. From June through December 1984, route 71 trolleybuses as well as short turns of route 70 were extended to Watertown Yard during reconstruction at Watertown Square.

During the 1970s and 1980s, the line was kept open for maintenance moves to the carhouse at night. After the newly arrived Boeing LRVs began failing in the late 1970s, the MBTA was desperate for functional rolling stock. At Watertown, 15 out-of-service and wrecked PCC streetcars were rebuilt to as-new condition. (Ten of these cars still run on the Mattapan Line). Crews at the carhouse rebuilt trolleybuses serving the Harvard lines, converted other PCC cars into work cars, and salvaged trucks from pre-1924 Blue Line stock to build new work cars. LRVs and even the still-in-use Type 7 cars were brought in for maintenance work, using LRVs equipped with trolley poles to tow the modern pantograph-equipped cars under the older trolley wire. The carhouse was closed in March 1994, and removal of the overhead wires along the track connecting it to the system began in June 1994.

By the time the tracks to Watertown were removed later in 1994, Watertown served primarily as the Green Line's scrapyard. Several wrecked cars, including sections of cars 3648 and 3639 wrecked at Copley in 1989, remained in the carhouse until they were scrapped in 2012. As of 2021, tracks remain in the yard and in the carhouse itself.

Watertown Carhouse is now primarily used as a midday layover for buses, as a crew base, and for light maintenance work. Until January 2006, it was used for servicing, storage, and testing of new dual-mode buses and trolleybuses for the Silver Line Phase 2 BRT sets, which were tested under the wires used by route 71.

Until 2024, passengers boarded buses at the northwest corner of the yard, adjacent to Nonantum Road. On March 11, 2024, the stops were relocated as part of a street reconfiguration associated with a nearby development. The final stop for terminating buses was moved to Galen Street. The first stop for departing buses was temporarily on Water Street; it moved to Technology Way in 2025. As of 2024, the city of Watertown plans to extend route 71 to Watertown Yard, and to terminate route 59 there, as part of a reconfiguration of Watertown Square.
