= List of MBTA subway stations =

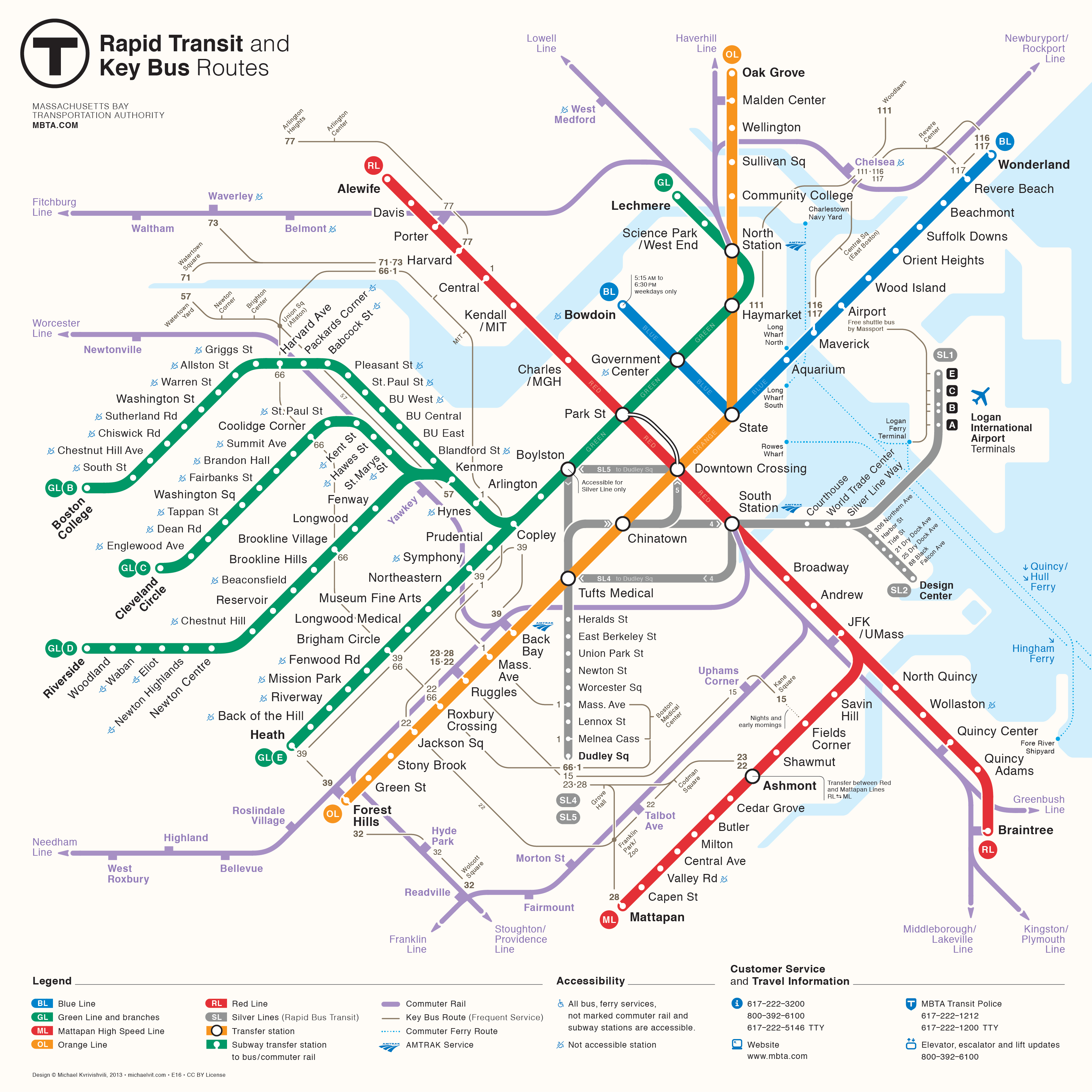
Stylized map of the Boston subway system from 2013. The map does not reflect changes since, including the 2014 opening of Assembly station, the 2018 start of SL3 service, and the 2022 opening of the Green Line Extension.

This is a list of MBTA subway stations in Boston and surrounding municipalities. All stations are operated by the Massachusetts Bay Transportation Authority. This list includes all rapid transit, light rail, and bus rapid transit (BRT) stations currently open on the MBTA's subway system. As of November 2026, the system has 152 stops and stations served by the Green, Blue, Red, Orange, and Silver lines. These range in scale from marked stops on the Green and Silver lines with no fixed infrastructure, to sprawling underground complexes at the downtown transfer stations. Stations are typically named after nearby streets, squares, neighborhoods, or institutions—e.g., Park Street, Central, Chinatown, and Airport, respectively. One station, Symphony, is closed from 2026 to 2029 for reconstruction.

An infill station on the Silver Line at Day Square has been proposed. One additional Green Line station, Mystic Valley Parkway, is proposed but not funded.

== Key ==
Station	Indicates the MBTA's official name for the station; if the station is accessible, a wheelchair symbol appears next to the station name Further information: MBTA accessibility
Line (branch)	Indicates the lines that stop at the given station; when all branches of a line stop at a station, only the line is shown
Connections	Denotes links to MBTA commuter rail, bus, and ferry routes, as well as other transit providers
City/neighborhood	Identifies the municipality (and in certain municipalities, the neighborhood) in which the station is located
Station info	A link to the station's information page on the MBTA website
‡	Official transfer stations
†	Terminals
†‡	Transfer station and terminal

== Stations ==
Station	Line (branch)	Connections	City/neighborhood	Station info
23 Drydock Avenue	Silver Line (SL2)		Boston/South Boston	Link
27 Drydock Avenue	Silver Line (SL2)		Boston/South Boston	Link
Airport ‡	Blue Line; Silver Line (SL3)	MBTA bus: 104, 171; Massport shuttles: 22, 33, 55, 66, 88	Boston/East Boston	Link
Alewife †	Red Line	MBTA bus: 62, 67, 76, 83, 350; 128 Business Council: A1, A2, A3, A5, A6, R1, R2	Cambridge/North Cambridge	Link
Allston Street	Green Line (B)		Boston/Allston	Link
Amory Street	Green Line (B)	MBTA bus: 57	Boston/Fenway–Kenmore	Link
Andrew	Red Line	MBTA bus: CT3, 10, 16, 17, 18, 171	Boston/South Boston	Link
Aquarium	Blue Line	MBTA bus: 4 MBTA ferry: F2H, F3, F4, F5 (at Long Wharf); F6, F7, F8, F10 (at Central Wharf)	Boston/Downtown	Link
Arlington	Green Line	MBTA bus: 9, 10, 55, 501, 504	Boston/Back Bay	Link
Ashmont †‡	Red Line; Mattapan Line	MBTA bus: 18, 21, 22, 23, 24, 26, 215, 217, 240; BAT: 12	Boston/Dorchester	Link
Assembly	Orange Line		Somerville/Assembly Square	Link
Babcock Street	Green Line (B)	MBTA bus: 57	Boston/Fenway–Kenmore	Link
Back Bay ‡	Orange Line	Acela, Lake Shore Limited, Northeast Regional; Framingham/Worcester Line; Franklin/Foxboro Line; Needham Line; Providence/Stoughton Line; MBTA bus: 10, 39	Boston/Back Bay	Link
Back of the Hill	Green Line (E)	MBTA bus: 39, 192	Boston/Mission Hill	Link
Ball Square	Green Line (E)	MBTA bus: 80, 89	Somerville	Link
Beachmont	Blue Line	MBTA bus: 119	Revere/Beachmont	Link
Beaconsfield	Green Line (D)		Brookline	Link
Bellingham Square	Silver Line (SL3)	MBTA bus: 104, 111, 112, 114, 116	Chelsea/Bellingham Square	Link
Blandford Street	Green Line (B)	MBTA bus: 57	Boston/Fenway–Kenmore	Link
Boston College †	Green Line (B)		Boston/Brighton	Link
Boston University Central	Green Line (B)	MBTA bus: 47, 57, 85	Boston/Fenway–Kenmore	Link
Boston University East	Green Line (B)	MBTA bus: 57	Boston/Fenway–Kenmore	Link
Bowdoin †	Blue Line		Boston/Beacon Hill	Link
Box District	Silver Line (SL3)		Chelsea	Link
Boylston	Green Line; Silver Line (SL5)	MBTA bus: 43	Boston/Downtown	Link
Braintree †‡	Red Line (Braintree)	Fall River/New Bedford Line; Kingston Line; CapeFLYER; MBTA bus: 226, 230, 236	Braintree	Link
Brandon Hall	Green Line (C)		Brookline	Link
Brigham Circle	Green Line (E)	MBTA bus: 39, 66	Boston/Mission Hill	Link
Broadway	Red Line	MBTA bus: 9, 11, 47	Boston/South Boston	Link
Brookline Hills	Green Line (D)	MBTA bus: 60	Brookline	Link
Brookline Village	Green Line (D)	MBTA bus: 60, 65, 66	Brookline	Link
Butler	Mattapan Line		Boston/Dorchester	Link
Capen Street	Mattapan Line		Milton	Link
Cedar Grove	Mattapan Line		Boston/Dorchester	Link
Central	Red Line	MBTA bus: 1, 47, 64, 70, 83, 91	Cambridge/Central Square	Link
Central Avenue	Mattapan Line	MBTA bus: 240; BAT: 12	Milton	Link
Charles/MGH	Red Line		Boston/West End	Link
Chelsea	Silver Line (SL3)	Newburyport/Rockport Line; MBTA bus: 112, 114; Lower Mystic Link	Chelsea	Link
Chestnut Hill	Green Line (D)		Newton/Chestnut Hill	Link
Chestnut Hill Avenue	Green Line (B)	MBTA bus: 86	Boston/Brighton	Link
Chinatown ‡	Orange Line; Silver Line (SL4, SL5)	MBTA bus: 11	Boston/Chinatown	Link
Chinatown Gate	Silver Line (SL4)	MBTA bus: 501, 504, 505	Boston/Chinatown	Link
Chiswick Road	Green Line (B)		Boston/Brighton	Link
Cleveland Circle †‡	Green Line (C)	: 51, 86 (at Reservoir)	Boston/Brighton	Link
Community College	Orange Line		Boston/Charlestown	Link
Coolidge Corner	Green Line (C)	MBTA bus: 66; Flixbus	Brookline/Coolidge Corner	Link
Copley	Green Line	MBTA bus: 9, 39, 55	Boston/Back Bay	Link
Courthouse	Silver Line (SL1, SL2, SL3, SLW)	MBTA bus: 4	Boston/South Boston	Link
Davis	Red Line	MBTA bus: 87, 88, 89, 90, 94, 96	Somerville/Davis Square	Link
Dean Road	Green Line (C)		Brookline	Link
Design Center	Silver Line (SL2)	MBTA bus: 4	Boston/South Boston	Link
Downtown Crossing ‡	Orange Line; Red Line; Silver Line (SL5)	MBTA bus: 7, 11, 501, 504, 505; 43 (at Park Street)	Boston/Downtown	Link
Drydock Avenue & Black Falcon Avenue	Silver Line (SL2)		Boston/South Boston	Link
East Berkeley Street	Silver Line (SL4, SL5)	MBTA bus: 9, 11	Boston/South End	Link
East Somerville	Green Line (E)	MBTA bus: 85, 91, 109	Somerville	Link
Eastern Avenue	Silver Line (SL3)	MBTA bus: 104, 112	Chelsea	Link
Eliot	Green Line (D)		Newton/Newton Upper Falls	Link
Englewood Avenue	Green Line (C)		Brookline	Link
Fenway	Green Line (D)	MBTA bus: 47, 85	Boston/Fenway–Kenmore	Link
Fenwood Road	Green Line (E)	MBTA bus: 39, 66; Mission Hill Link	Boston/Mission Hill	Link
Fields Corner	Red Line (Ashmont)	MBTA bus: 15, 17, 18, 19, 201, 202, 210	Boston/Dorchester	Link
Forest Hills †‡	Orange Line	Needham Line; Providence/Stoughton Line; Franklin/Foxboro Line; MBTA bus: 16, 21, 30, 31, 32, 34, 34E, 35, 36, 37, 38, 39, 40, 42, 50, 51	Boston/Jamaica Plain	Link
Gilman Square	Green Line (E)	MBTA bus: 80	Somerville	Link
Government Center †‡	Blue Line; Green Line (B, C, D, E)		Boston/Downtown	Link
Green Street	Orange Line		Boston/Jamaica Plain	Link
Griggs Street	Green Line (B)		Boston/Allston	Link
Harvard ‡	Red Line	MBTA bus: 1, 66, 68, 69, 71, 73, 74, 75, 77, 78, 86, 96, 109; Watertown Connector shuttles	Cambridge/Harvard Square	Link
Harvard Avenue	Green Line (B)	MBTA bus: 66	Boston/Allston	Link
Hawes Street	Green Line (C)		Brookline	Link
Haymarket ‡	Orange Line; Green Line (D, E)	MBTA bus: 4, 92, 93, 111, 354, 426, 428, 450	Boston/Downtown	Link
Heath Street †	Green Line (E)	MBTA bus: 14, 39	Boston/Jamaica Plain	Link
Herald Street	Silver Line (SL4, SL5)	MBTA bus: 9, 11	Boston/South End	Link
Hynes Convention Center	Green Line (B, C, D)	MBTA bus: 1, 55	Boston/Back Bay	Link
Jackson Square	Orange Line	MBTA bus: 14, 22, 29, 41, 44	Boston/Jamaica Plain	Link
JFK/UMass ‡	Red Line	Greenbush Line; Fall River/New Bedford Line; Kingston Line; MBTA bus: 8, 16, 41	Boston/Dorchester	Link
Kendall/MIT	Red Line	MBTA bus: 64, 68, 85; EZRide	Cambridge/Kendall Square	Link
Kenmore ‡	Green Line (B, C, D)	MBTA bus: 8, 19, 57, 60; Framingham/Worcester Line (at Lansdowne)	Boston/Fenway–Kenmore	Link
Kent Street	Green Line (C)		Brookline	Link
Lechmere	Green Line (D, E)	MBTA bus: 69, 80, 87, 88; EZRide	Cambridge/Lechmere Square	Link
Lenox Street	Silver Line (SL4, SL5)	MBTA bus: 8	Boston/Roxbury	Link
Longwood	Green Line (D)		Brookline	Link
Longwood Medical Area	Green Line (E)	MBTA bus: 39, 65, 85; Mission Hill Link	Boston/Mission Hill	Link
Magoun Square	Green Line (E)		Somerville	Link
Malden Center ‡	Orange Line	Haverhill Line; MBTA bus: 97, 99, 101, 104, 105, 106, 108, 131, 132, 137, 411, 430	Malden	Link
Massachusetts Avenue	Orange Line	MBTA bus: 1	Boston/Fenway–Kenmore	Link
Massachusetts Avenue	Silver Line (SL4, SL5)	MBTA bus: 1, 8	Boston/South End	Link
Mattapan †	Mattapan Line	MBTA bus: 24, 28, 29, 30, 31, 33, 245, 716	Boston/Mattapan	Link
Maverick	Blue Line	MBTA bus: 114, 116, 120, 121; MBTA ferry: F3 (at Lewis Wharf)	Boston/East Boston	Link
Medford/Tufts †	Green Line (E)	MBTA bus: 80, 94, 96	Medford	Link
Melnea Cass Boulevard	Silver Line (SL4, SL5)	MBTA bus: 1, 8, 19, 47, 171, CT3	Boston/Roxbury	Link
Milton	Mattapan Line	MBTA bus: 217	Milton	Link
Mission Park	Green Line (E)	MBTA bus: 39, 66	Boston/Mission Hill	Link
Museum of Fine Arts	Green Line (E)	MBTA bus: 8, 19, 39, 47, 65, 85, CT3	Boston/Fenway–Kenmore	Link
Newton Centre	Green Line (D)	MBTA bus: 52	Newton/Newton Centre	Link
Newton Highlands	Green Line (D)	MBTA bus: 59; 128 Business Council: N1	Newton/Newton Highlands	Link
Newton Street	Silver Line (SL4, SL5)	MBTA bus: 8, 10	Boston/South End	Link
North Quincy	Red Line (Braintree)	MBTA bus: 210, 211, 217	Quincy/North Quincy	Link
North Station ‡	Orange Line; Green Line (D, E)	Downeaster; Fitchburg Line; Haverhill Line; Lowell Line; Newburyport/Rockport Line; MBTA bus: 4 EZRide; MBTA ferry: F10 (at Lovejoy Wharf); Seaport Ferry (at Lovejoy Wharf)	Boston/West End	Link
Northeastern University	Green Line (E)	MBTA bus: 39	Boston/Fenway–Kenmore	Link
Northern Avenue & Harbor Street	Silver Line (SL2)	MBTA bus: 4	Boston/South Boston	Link
Northern Avenue & Tide Street	Silver Line (SL2)	MBTA bus: 4	Boston/South Boston	Link
Nubian	Silver Line (SL4, SL5)	MBTA bus: 1, 8, 14, 15, 19, 23, 28, 29, 41, 42, 44, 45, 47, 66, 171	Boston/Roxbury	Link
Oak Grove †	Orange Line	Haverhill Line; MBTA bus: 131, 132, 137	Malden	Link
Orient Heights	Blue Line	MBTA bus: 120, 712, 713	Boston/East Boston	Link
Packards Corner	Green Line (B)	MBTA bus: 57	Boston/Allston	Link
Park Street ‡	Red Line; Green Line	MBTA bus: 43 (SL5) 7, 11, 501, 504, 505 (at Downtown Crossing)	Boston/Downtown	Link
Porter	Red Line	Fitchburg Line; MBTA bus: 77, 83, 96	Cambridge/Porter Square	Link
Prudential	Green Line (E)	MBTA bus: 39, 55	Boston/Back Bay	Link
Quincy Adams	Red Line (Braintree)	MBTA bus: 230, 238	Quincy/South Quincy	Link
Quincy Center ‡	Red Line (Braintree)	Greenbush Line; Fall River/New Bedford Line; Kingston Line; MBTA bus: 210, 211, 215, 216, 217, 220, 222, 225, 230, 236, 238, 245	Quincy/Quincy Center	Link
Reservoir ‡	Green Line (D)	MBTA bus: 51, 86 (at Cleveland Circle)	Brookline	Link
Revere Beach	Blue Line	MBTA bus: 110, 411	Revere	Link
Riverside †	Green Line (D)	MBTA bus: 558; MWRTA: MassBay Riverside Shuttle; Blue Apple Bus, Go Buses, Megabus	Newton/Auburndale	Link
Riverway	Green Line (E)	MBTA bus: 39, 66	Boston/Mission Hill	Link
Roxbury Crossing	Orange Line	MBTA bus: 15, 22, 23, 28, 44, 45, 66; Mission Hill Link	Boston/Roxbury	Link
Ruggles ‡	Orange Line	Franklin/Foxboro Line; Needham Line; Providence/Stoughton Line; MBTA bus: 8, 15, 19, 22, 23, 28, 43, 44, 45, 47, 65, 85, CT3; Mission Hill Link	Boston/Roxbury	Link
Savin Hill	Red Line (Ashmont)		Boston/Dorchester	Link
Science Park	Green Line (D, E)	–	Boston/West End	Link
Shawmut	Red Line (Ashmont)		Boston/Dorchester	Link
Silver Line Way ‡	Silver Line (SL1, SL2, SL3, SLW)		Boston/South Boston	Link
South Station †‡	Red Line; Silver Line (SL1, SL2, SL3, SL4, SLW)	Acela, Lake Shore Limited, Northeast Regional; Framingham/Worcester Line; Needham Line; Franklin/Foxboro Line; Providence/Stoughton Line; Fairmount Line; Greenbush Line; Fall River/New Bedford Line; Kingston Line; CapeFLYER; MBTA bus: 4, 7, 11; Intercity buses at South Station Bus Terminal	Boston/Downtown	Link
South Street	Green Line (B)		Boston/Brighton	Link
Saint Mary's Street	Green Line (C)	MBTA bus: 47, 85	Brookline	Link
Saint Paul Street	Green Line (C)		Brookline	Link
State ‡	Blue Line; Orange Line	MBTA bus: 4, 92, 93, 354	Boston/Downtown	Link
Stony Brook	Orange Line		Boston/Jamaica Plain	Link
Suffolk Downs	Blue Line		Boston/East Boston	Link
Sullivan Square	Orange Line	MBTA bus: 85, 89, 90, 91, 92, 93, 95, 101, 105, 109; Lower Mystic Link	Boston/Charlestown	Link
Summit Avenue	Green Line (C)		Brookline	Link
Sutherland Road	Green Line (B)		Boston/Brighton	Link
Symphony	Green Line (E)	MBTA bus: 1, 39	Boston/Fenway–Kenmore	Link
Tappan Street	Green Line (C)		Brookline	Link
Terminal A	Silver Line (SL1)	MBTA bus: 171; Massport shuttles: 11, 22, 55, 66, 88; Intercity buses and Logan Express	Boston/East Boston	Link
Terminal B Stop 1	Silver Line (SL1)	MBTA bus: 171; Massport shuttles: 11, 22, 55, 66, 88; Intercity buses and Logan Express	Boston/East Boston	Link
Terminal B Stop 2	Silver Line (SL1)	MBTA bus: 171; Massport shuttles: 11, 22, 55, 66, 88; Intercity buses and Logan Express	Boston/East Boston	Link
Terminal C	Silver Line (SL1)	MBTA bus: 171; Massport shuttles: 11, 33, 55, 66, 88; Intercity buses and Logan Express	Boston/East Boston	Link
Terminal E	Silver Line (SL1)	MBTA bus: 171; Massport shuttles: 11, 33, 55, 66, 88; Intercity buses and Logan Express	Boston/East Boston	Link
Tufts Medical Center ‡	Orange Line; Silver Line (SL4, SL5)	MBTA bus: 11, 43	Boston/Chinatown	Link
Union Park Street	Silver Line (SL4, SL5)	MBTA bus: 8, 10	Boston/South End	Link
Union Square †	Green Line (D)	MBTA bus: 85, 87, 91, 109	Somerville/Union Square	Link
Valley Road	Mattapan Line		Milton	Link
Waban	Green Line (D)		Newton/Waban	Link
Warren Street	Green Line (B)		Boston/Brighton	Link
Washington Square	Green Line (C)	MBTA bus: 65	Brookline	Link
Washington Street	Green Line (B)	MBTA bus: 65	Boston/Brighton	Link
Wellington	Orange Line	MBTA bus: 97, 99, 100, 106, 108, 110, 112, 134	Medford	Link
Wollaston	Red Line (Braintree)	MBTA bus: 211	Quincy/Wollaston	Link
Wonderland †	Blue Line	MBTA bus: 110, 116, 411, 424, 426W, 439, 441, 442, 450W, 455	Revere	Link
Wood Island	Blue Line	MBTA bus: 112, 120, 121	Boston/East Boston	Link
Woodland	Green Line (D)	MWRTA: 201	Newton/Newton Lower Falls	Link
Worcester Square	Silver Line (SL4, SL5)	MBTA bus: 8	Boston/South End	Link
World Trade Center	Silver Line (SL1, SL2, SL3, SLW)		Boston/South Boston	Link

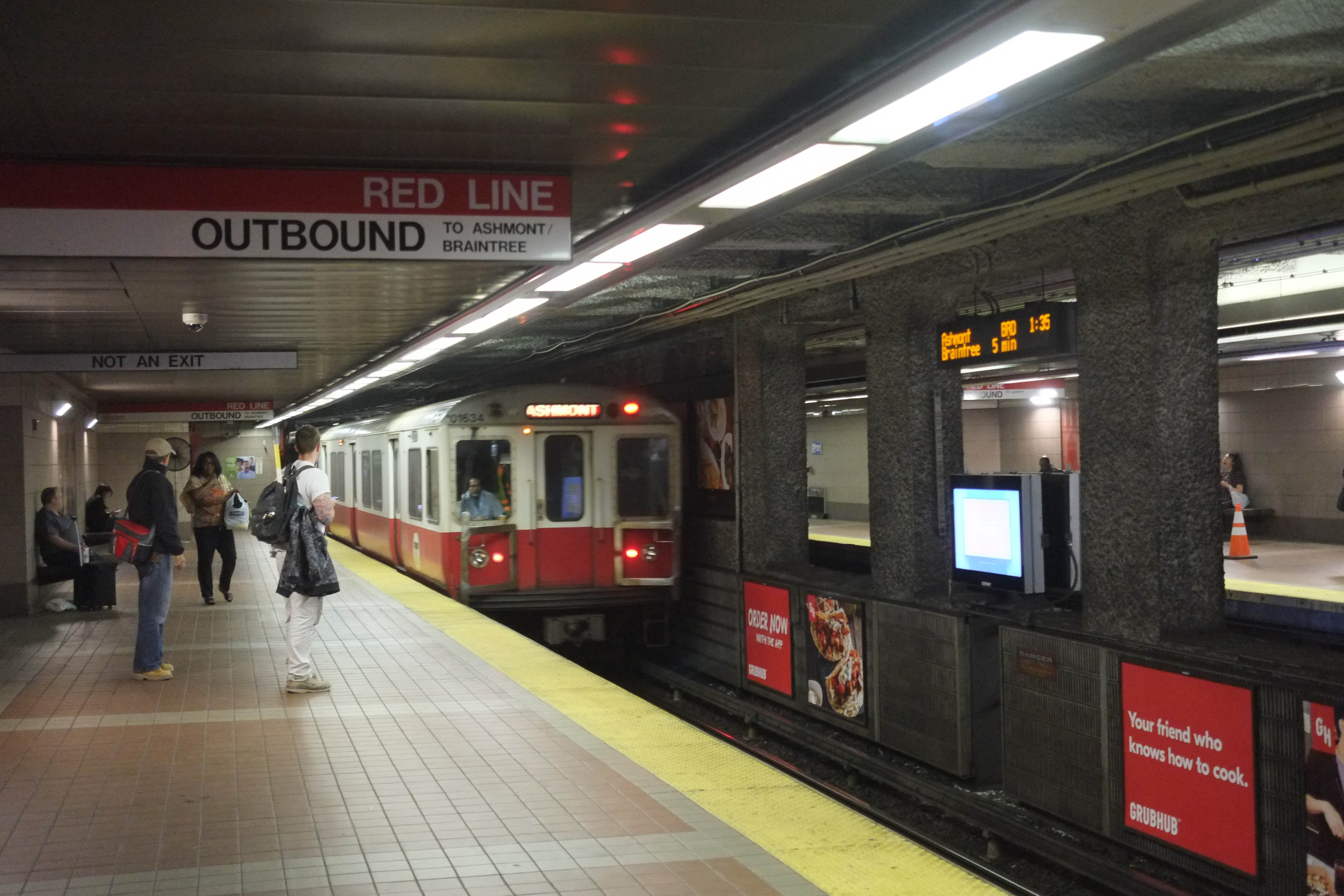
Averaging over 24,000 weekday boardings in 2019, South Station is the busiest MBTA subway station.

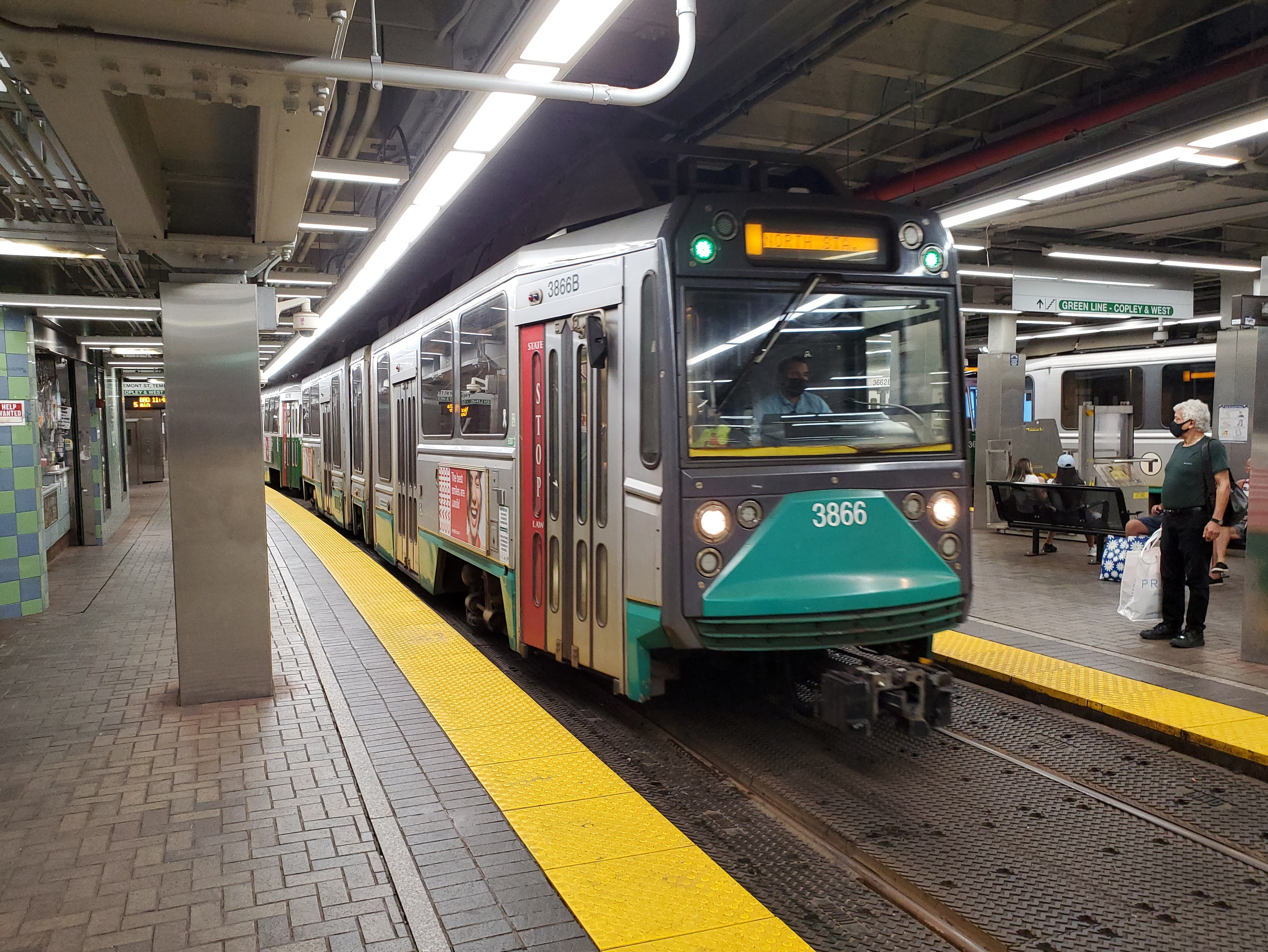
Park Street station is a busy transfer point for the Green Line and Red Line

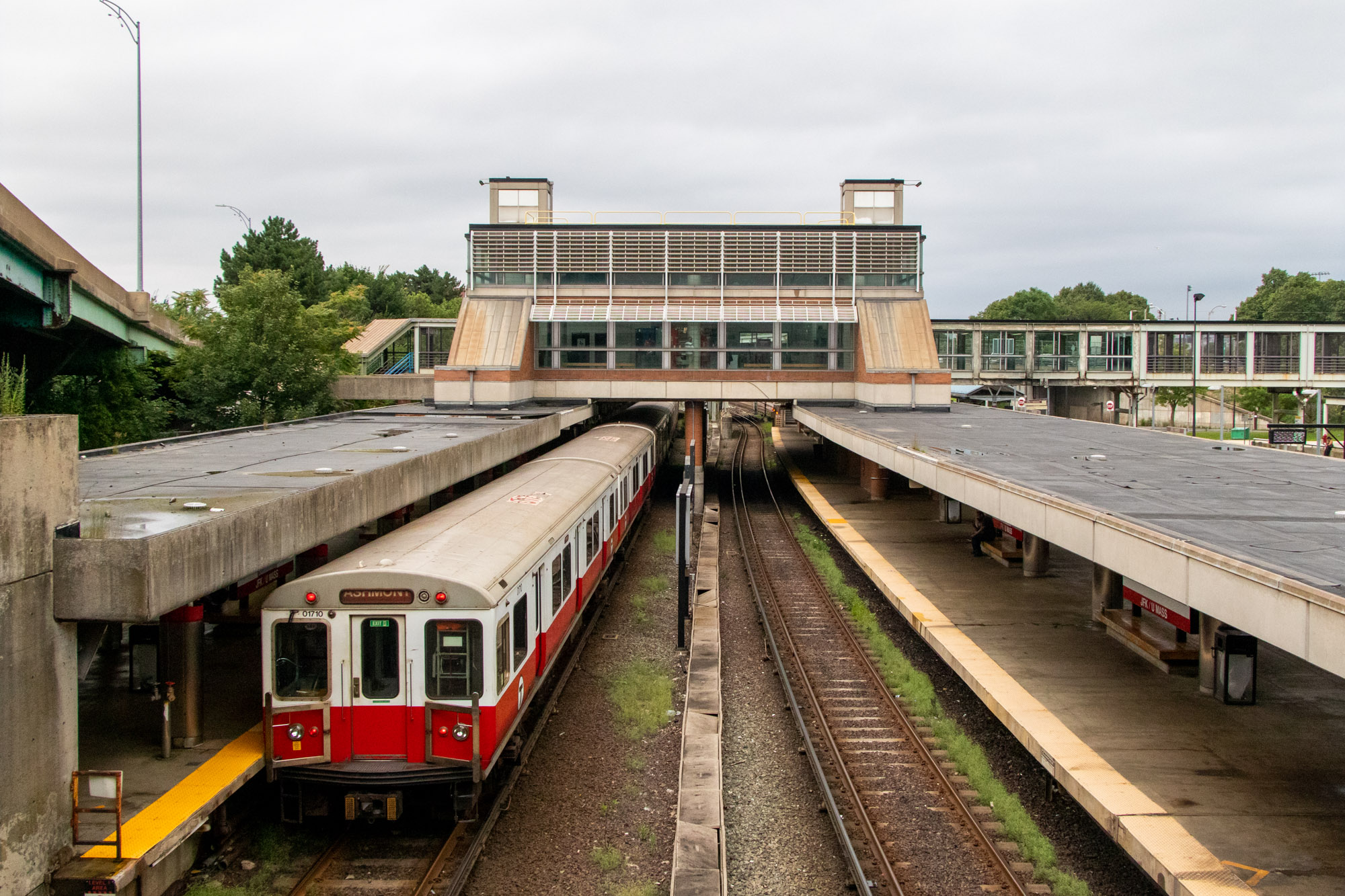
JFK/UMass station is one of several transfer points between the subway and Commuter Rail systems.

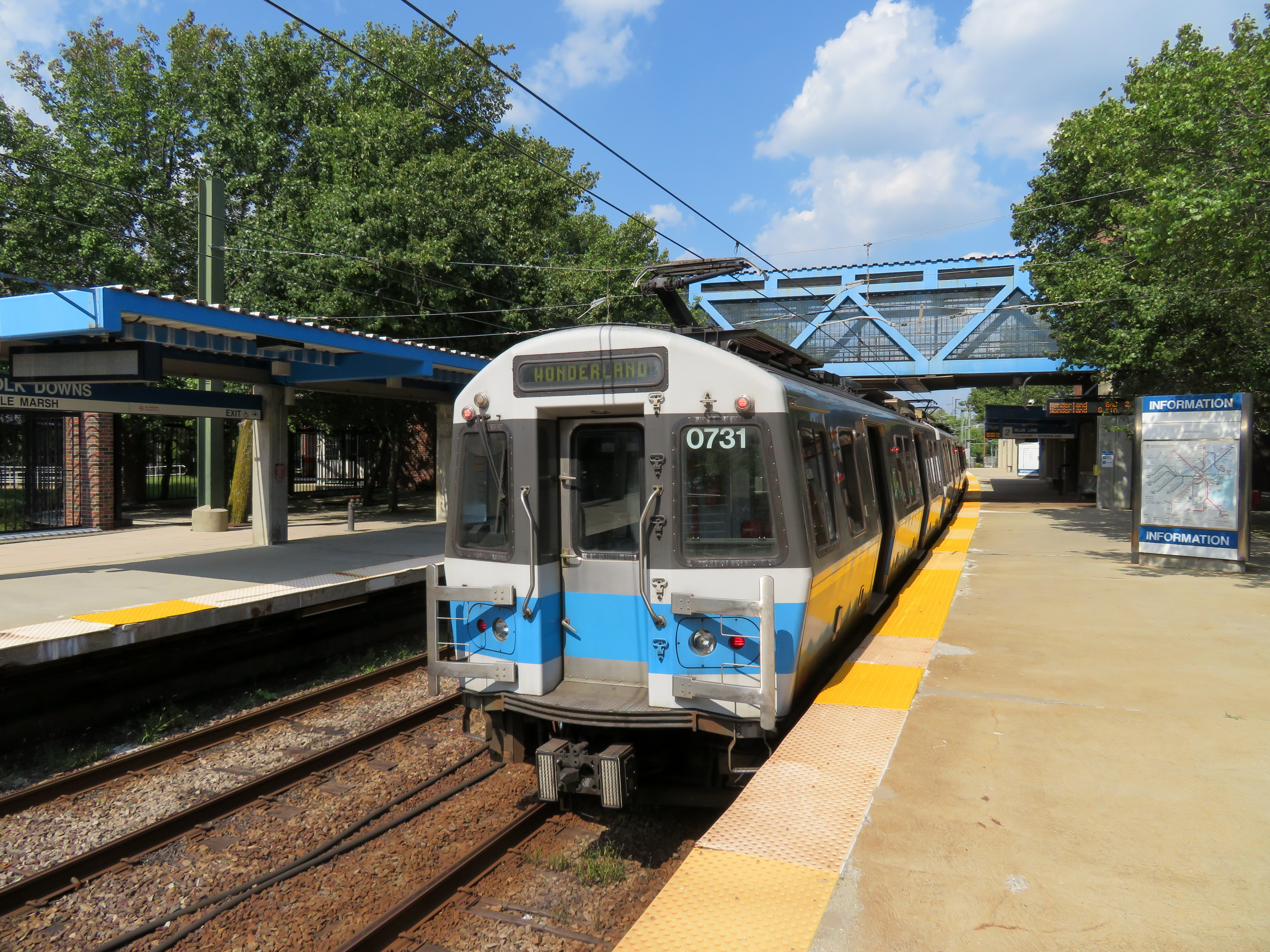
Suffolk Downs station, a typical station outside the downtown core

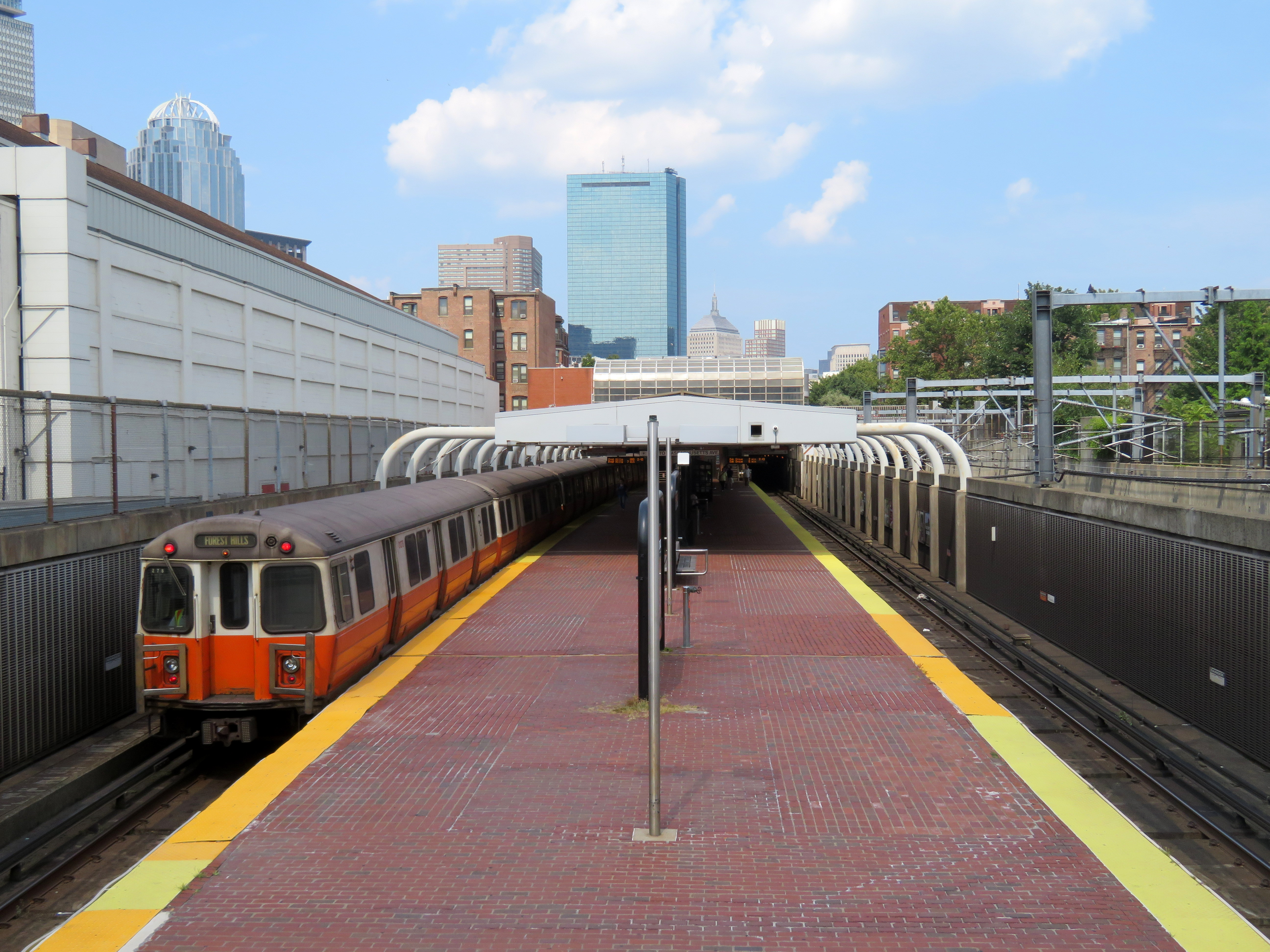
Most newer rail stations, like Massachusetts Avenue, have island platforms.

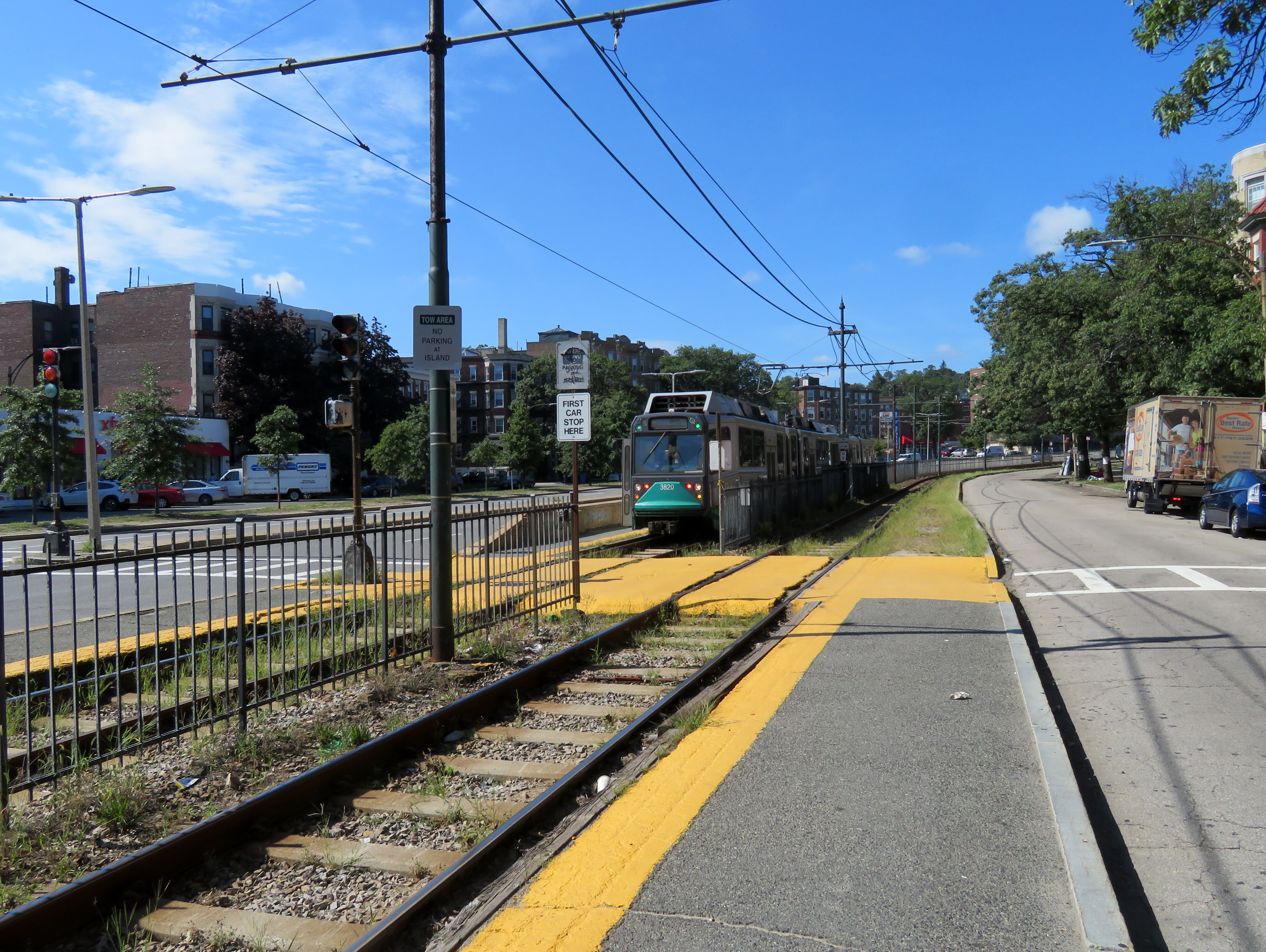
Griggs Street station, a typical non-accessible Green Line surface stop

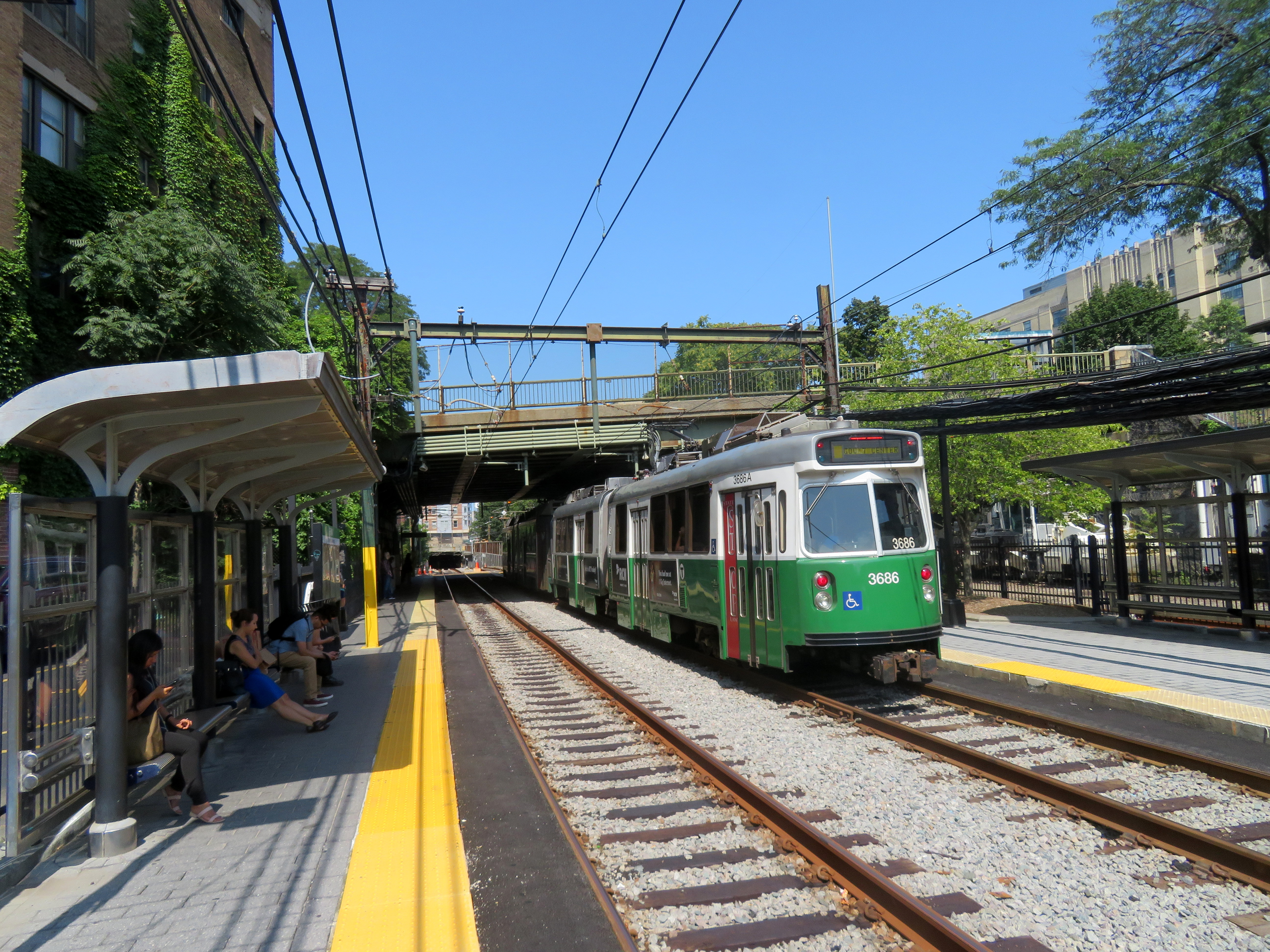
Fenway station, an accessible stop on the Green Line D branch

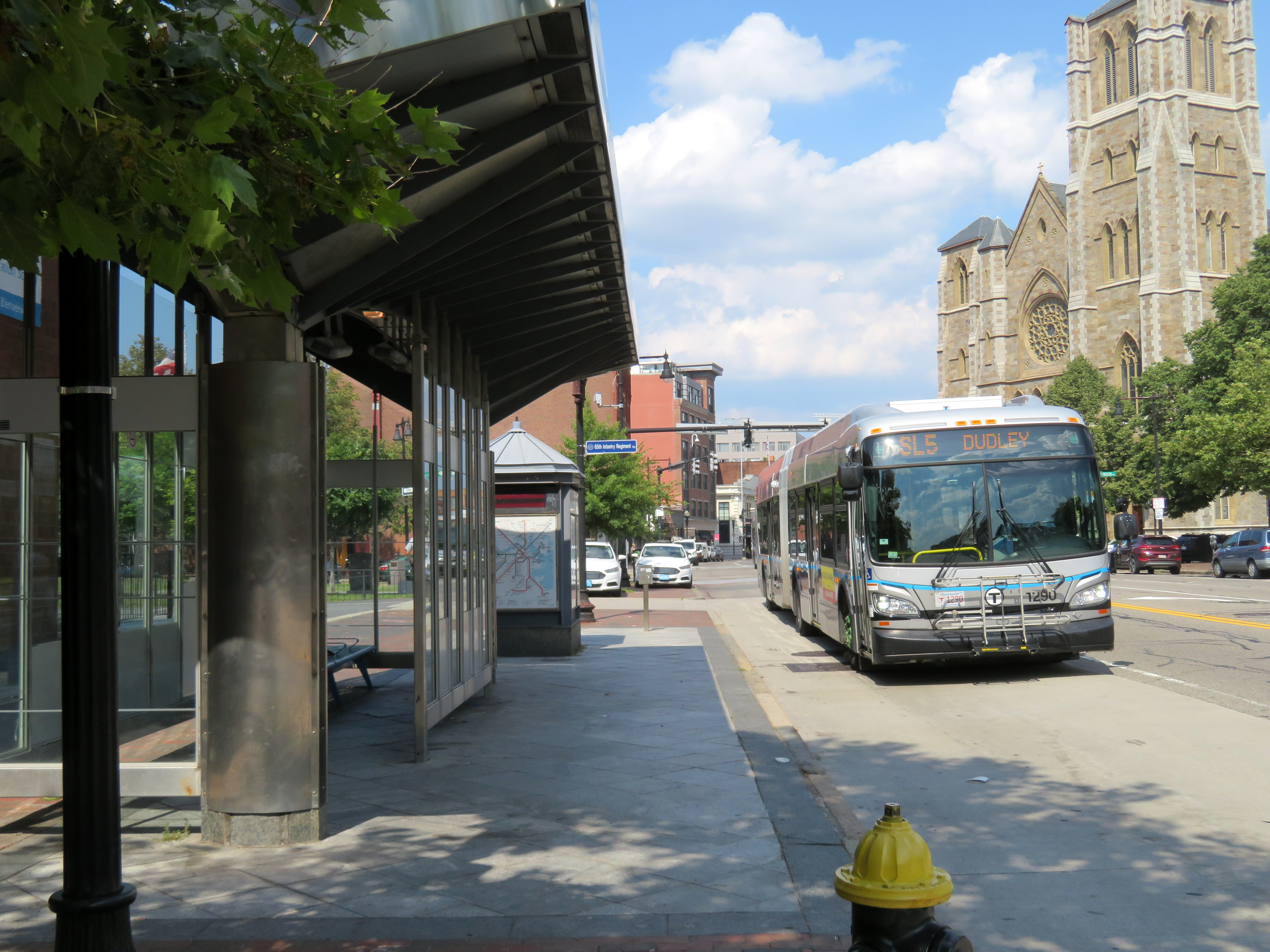
Union Park Street, a typical Silver Line street stop

== Former stations ==
=== Closed without replacement ===
This listing includes stations that have closed during the MBTA era (since 1964) without replacement by another rapid transit station. Most former stops on Green Line A branch and the outer section of the Green Line E branch, which were merely marked stopping locations rather than platforms, are not listed.

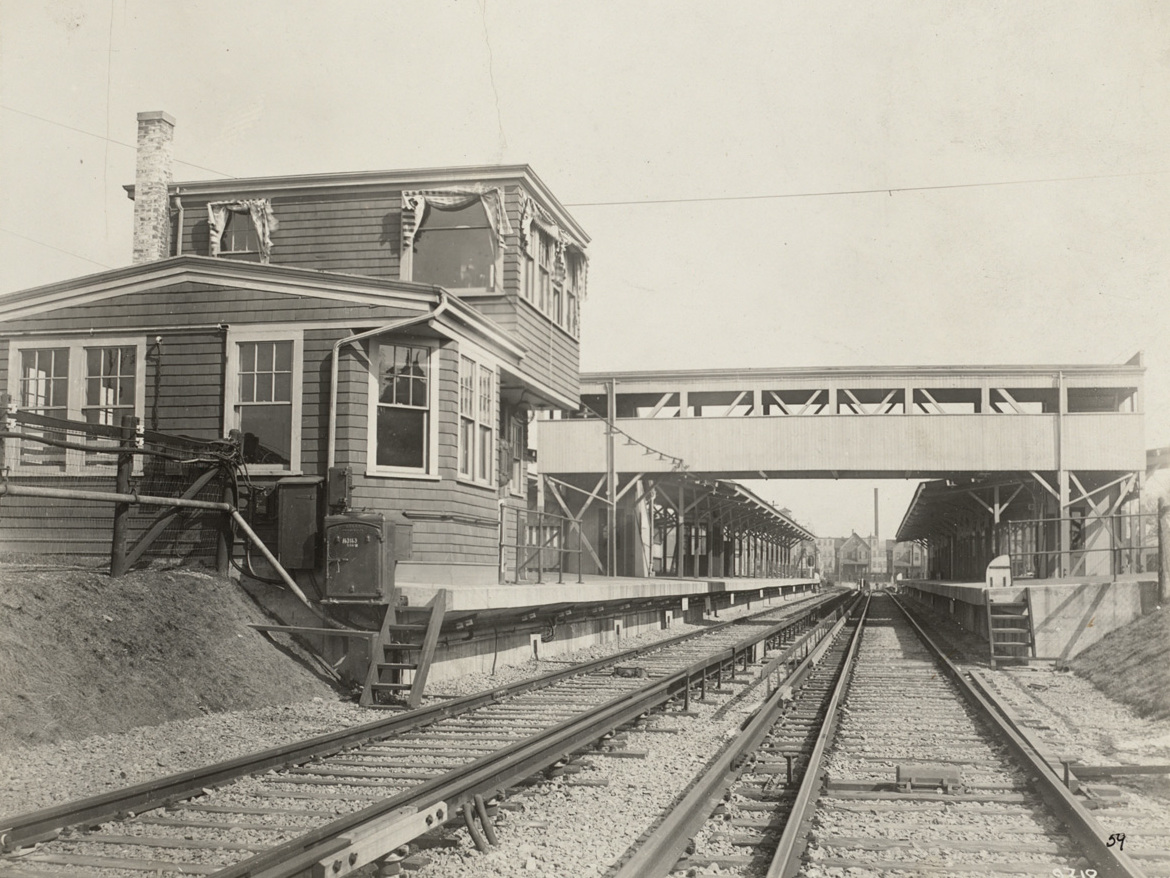
Everett station in 1918

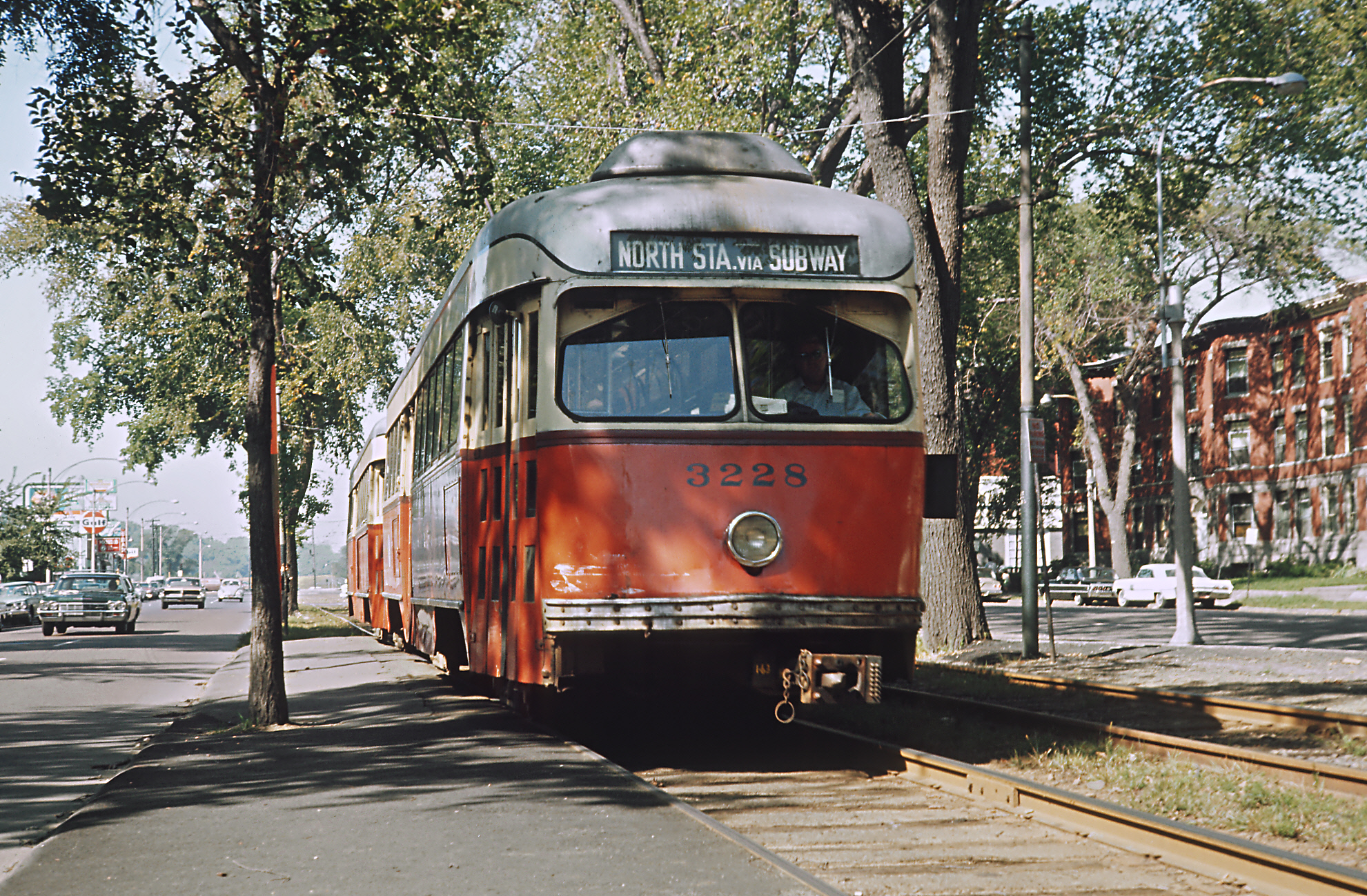
A train at Strathmore Road in 1965

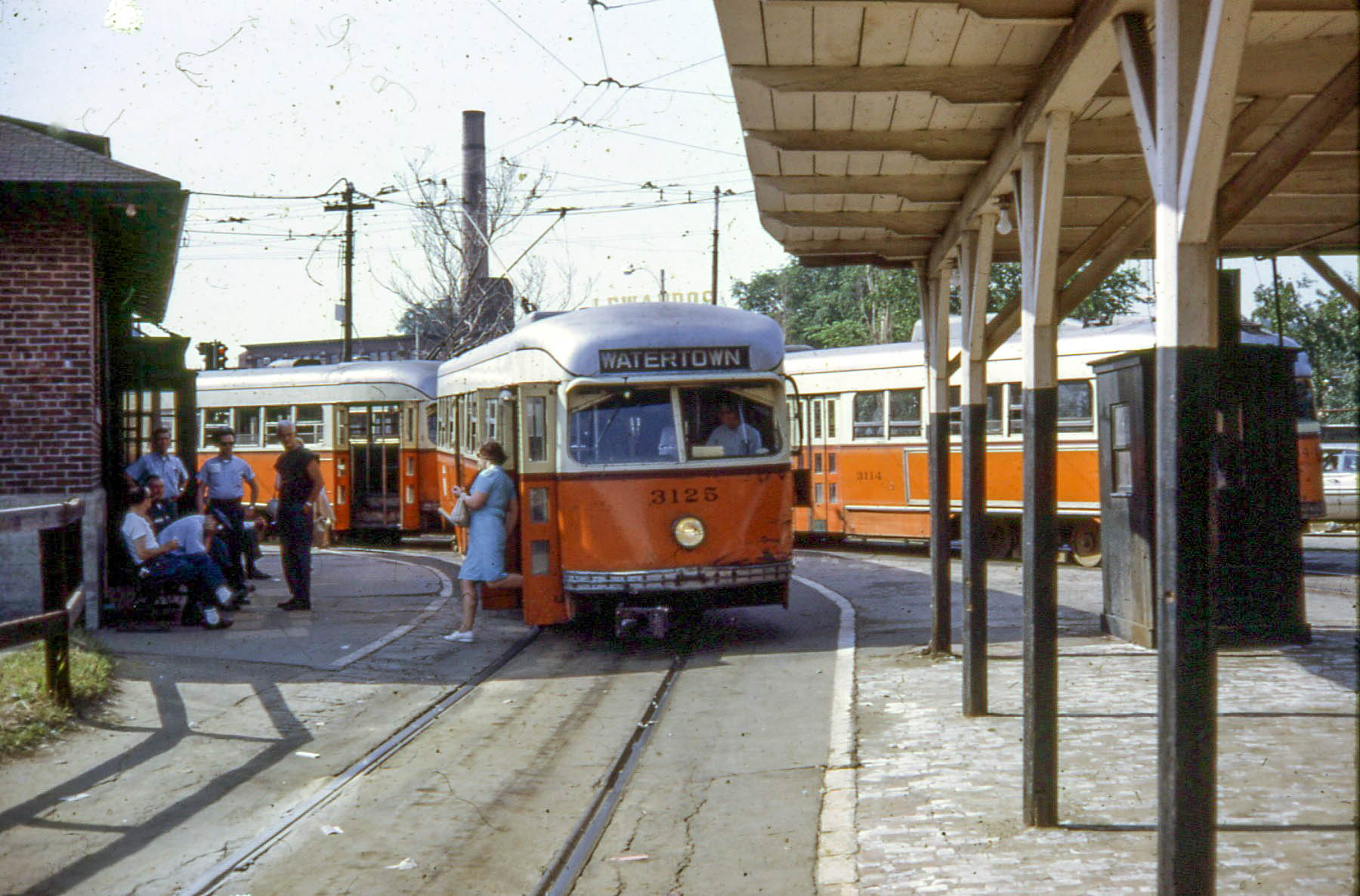
Watertown Yard was the terminus of the Green Line A branch.

Station	Line (branch)	City/neighborhood	Date closed	Refs
88 Black Falcon Avenue	Silver Line (SL2)	Boston/Seaport	April 2019	
Arborway	Green Line (E)	Boston/Jamaica Plain	December 28, 1985	
Black Falcon Avenue & Design Center Place	Silver Line (SL2)	Boston/Seaport	June 21, 2014	
Carlton Street	Green Line (C)	Brookline	July 24, 1982	
City Point	Silver Line (SL3)	Boston/South Boston	March 20, 2009	
City Square	Orange Line (Charlestown Elevated)	Boston/Charlestown	April 4, 1975	
East 1st Street & M Street	Silver Line (SL3)	Boston/South Boston	March 20, 2009	
Egleston	Orange Line (Washington Street Elevated)	Boston/Roxbury	April 30, 1987	
Everett	Orange Line (Charlestown Elevated)	Everett	April 4, 1975	
Fairbanks Street	Green Line (C)	Brookline	November 7, 2026	
Farragut Road	Silver Line (SL3)	Boston/South Boston	August 20, 2005	
Fordham Road	Green Line (B)	Boston/Allston	April 20, 2004	
Forsyth Street	Green Line (E)	Boston/Fenway–Kenmore	March 22, 1980	
Greycliff Road	Green Line (B)	Boston/Brighton	April 20, 2004	
Mount Hood Road	Green Line (B)	Boston/Brighton	April 20, 2004	
Newton Corner	Green Line (A)	Newton	June 21, 1969	
Oak Square	Green Line (A)	Boston/Brighton	June 21, 1969	
Parker Street	Green Line (E)	Boston/Fenway–Kenmore	March 22, 1980	
Stadium	Red Line	Cambridge	November 18, 1967	
Strathmore Road	Green Line (C)	Brookline	July 24, 1982	
Summer Street & Powerhouse Street	Silver Line (SL3)	Boston/South Boston	March 20, 2009	
Summit Avenue	Green Line (B)	Boston/Brighton	April 20, 2004	
Thompson Square	Orange Line (Charlestown Elevated)	Boston/Charlestown	April 4, 1975	
Union Square	Green Line (A)	Boston/Allston	June 21, 1969	
University Road	Green Line (B)	Boston/Fenway–Kenmore	c. 1975	
Vancouver Street	Green Line (E)	Boston/Fenway–Kenmore	March 22, 1980	
Watertown Yard	Green Line (A)	Watertown	June 21, 1969	
Wigglesworth Street	Green Line (E)	Boston/Longwood Medical Area	March 22, 1980	
Winchester Street	Green Line (C)	Brookline	July 24, 1982	
Winthrop Road	Green Line (C)	Brookline	July 24, 1982	

=== Closed with replacement ===
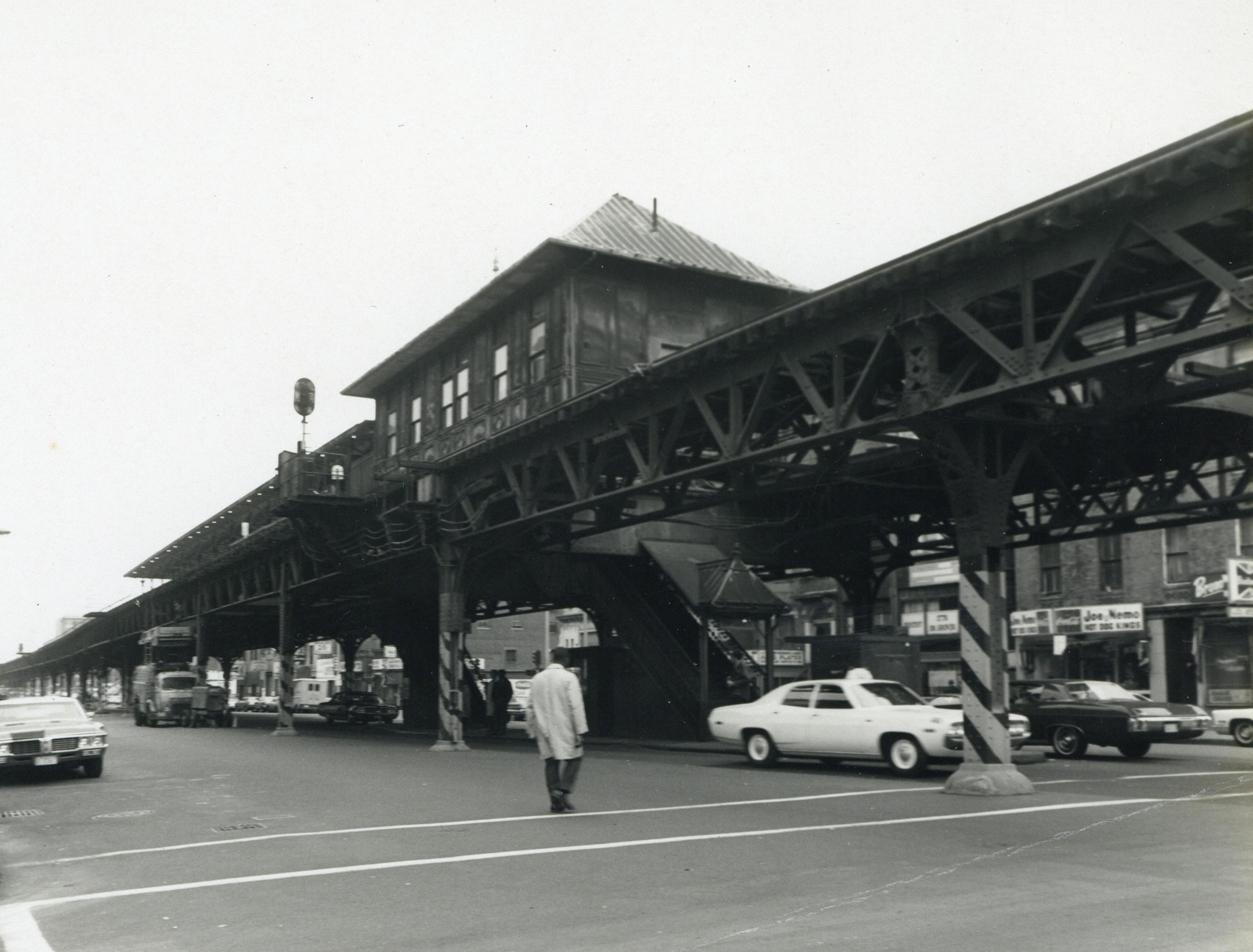
Northampton station, closed in 1987, is now the site of a surface-level Silver Line station.

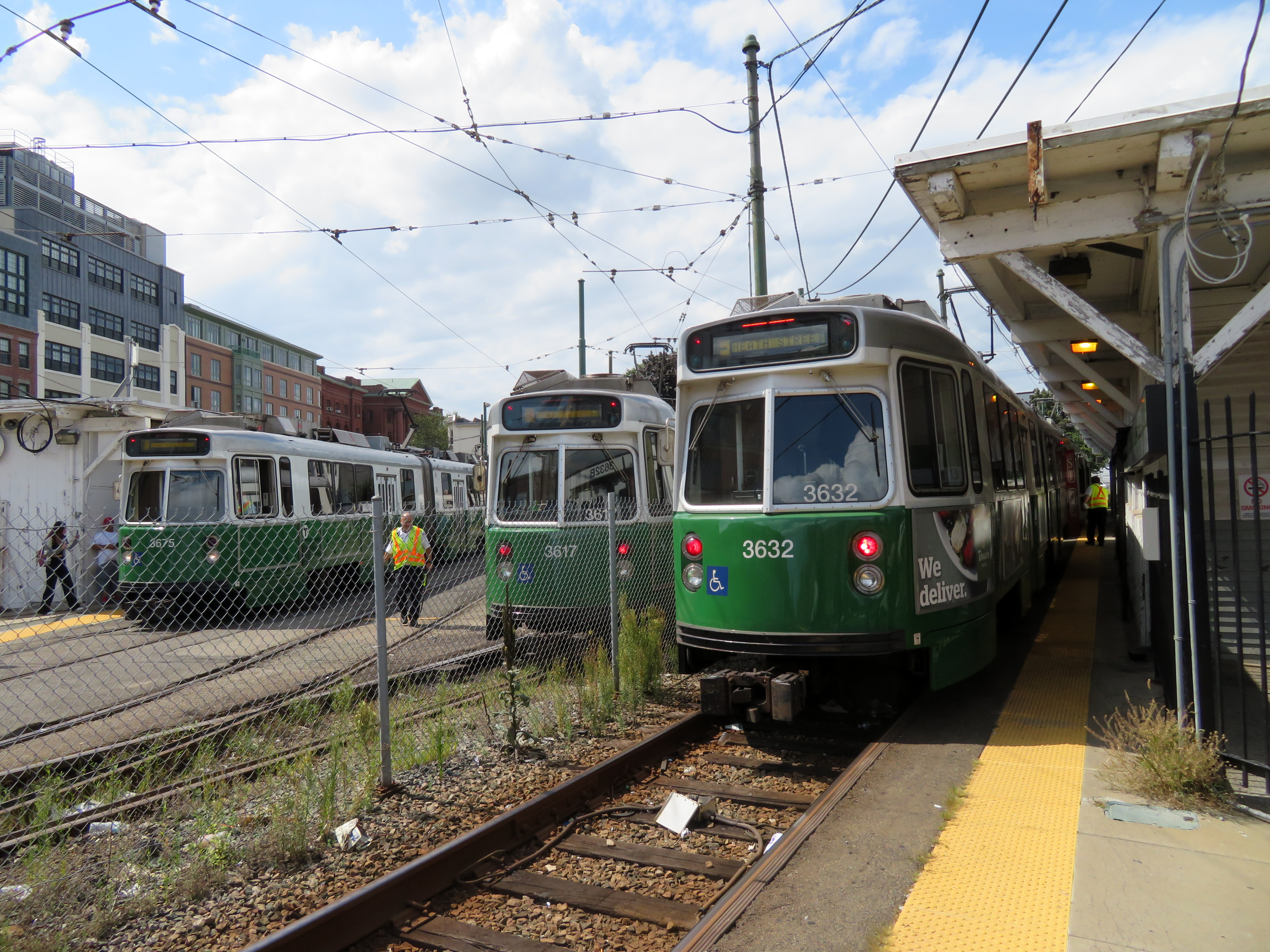
Lechmere station was closed in 2020 for replacement by an elevated station nearby

This listing includes stations that have closed during the MBTA era (since 1964), but were replaced with another rapid transit station. This includes stations rebuilt nearby on a different routing of the same line (such as Forest Hills when the Washington Street Elevated was replaced with the Southwest Corridor), temporary stations (such as Harvard/Brattle), and stations replaced with Silver Line stops (such as Dover). Most MBTA rapid transit stations have been rebuilt or substantially renovated on the same routing; these are not included.

Station	Line (branch)	City/neighborhood	Date closed	Replacement type	Refs
Alcorn Street	Green Line (B)	Boston/Allston	c. 1975	Replaced with Babcock Street	
Boston University West	Green Line (B)	Boston/Allston	November 12, 2021	Replaced with Amory Street	
Dover	Orange Line (Washington Street Elevated)	Boston/South End	April 30, 1987	Replaced with East Berkeley Street in 2002	
Dudley Square	Orange Line (Washington Street Elevated)	Boston/Roxbury	April 30, 1987	Replaced with Nubian in 2002	
Forest Hills	Orange Line (Washington Street Elevated)	Boston/Jamaica Plain	April 30, 1987	Rebuilt slightly west as part of Southwest Corridor construction	
Foster Street	Green Line (B)	Boston/Brighton	1970	Replaced by Greycliff Street	
Green Street	Orange Line (Washington Street Elevated)	Boston/Jamaica Plain	April 30, 1987	Rebuilt several blocks west as part of Southwest Corridor construction	
Harvard	Red Line	Cambridge	January 30, 1981	Rebuilt slightly north during Red Line Northwest Extension construction	
Harvard/Brattle	Red Line	Cambridge	September 2, 1983	Temporary station during Harvard station reconstruction	
Harvard/Holyoke	Red Line	Cambridge	September 2, 1983	Temporary station during Harvard station reconstruction	
Leamington Road	Green Line (B)	Boston/Brighton	June 21, 1980	Consolidated into Sutherland Road	
Lechmere	Green Line (E)	Cambridge	May 24, 2020	Rebuilt nearby as part of the Green Line Extension	
Northampton	Orange Line (Washington Street Elevated)	Boston/South End	April 30, 1987	Replaced with Massachusetts Avenue in 2002	
Pleasant Street	Green Line (B)	Boston/Allston	February 26, 2021	Replaced with Babcock Street	
Saint Paul Street	Green Line (B)	Boston/Allston	November 12, 2021	Replaced with Amory Street	
Sullivan Square	Orange Line (Charlestown Elevated)	Boston/Charlestown	April 4, 1975	Rebuilt nearby as part of the Haymarket North Extension	

== See also ==
- List of MBTA Commuter Rail stations
