= Fordham Road (disambiguation) =

Fordham Road may refer to:

- Fordham Road, a major street in The Bronx borough of New York City

== Subway stations ==
=== New York City ===
- Fordham Road (IRT Jerome Avenue Line), serving the 4 train
- Fordham Road (IND Concourse Line), serving the B and D trains
- Fordham Road – 190th Street (IRT Third Avenue Line), a former elevated station at Third Avenue

=== Boston ===
- Fordham Road station (MBTA), in Boston (Massachusetts, USA)
