= Englewood station =

Englewood station may refer to:

- Englewood Union Station in the Englewood neighborhood of Chicago, Illinois
- Englewood station (Chicago and Western Indiana Railroad) in the Englewood neighborhood of Chicago, Illinois
- Englewood station (Erie Railroad) in Englewood, New Jersey
- Englewood station (RTD) in Englewood, Colorado
- Englewood Avenue (MBTA station) in Brookline, Massachusetts
