= Griggs Street station =

Light rail station in Boston, Massachusetts, US

Griggs Street
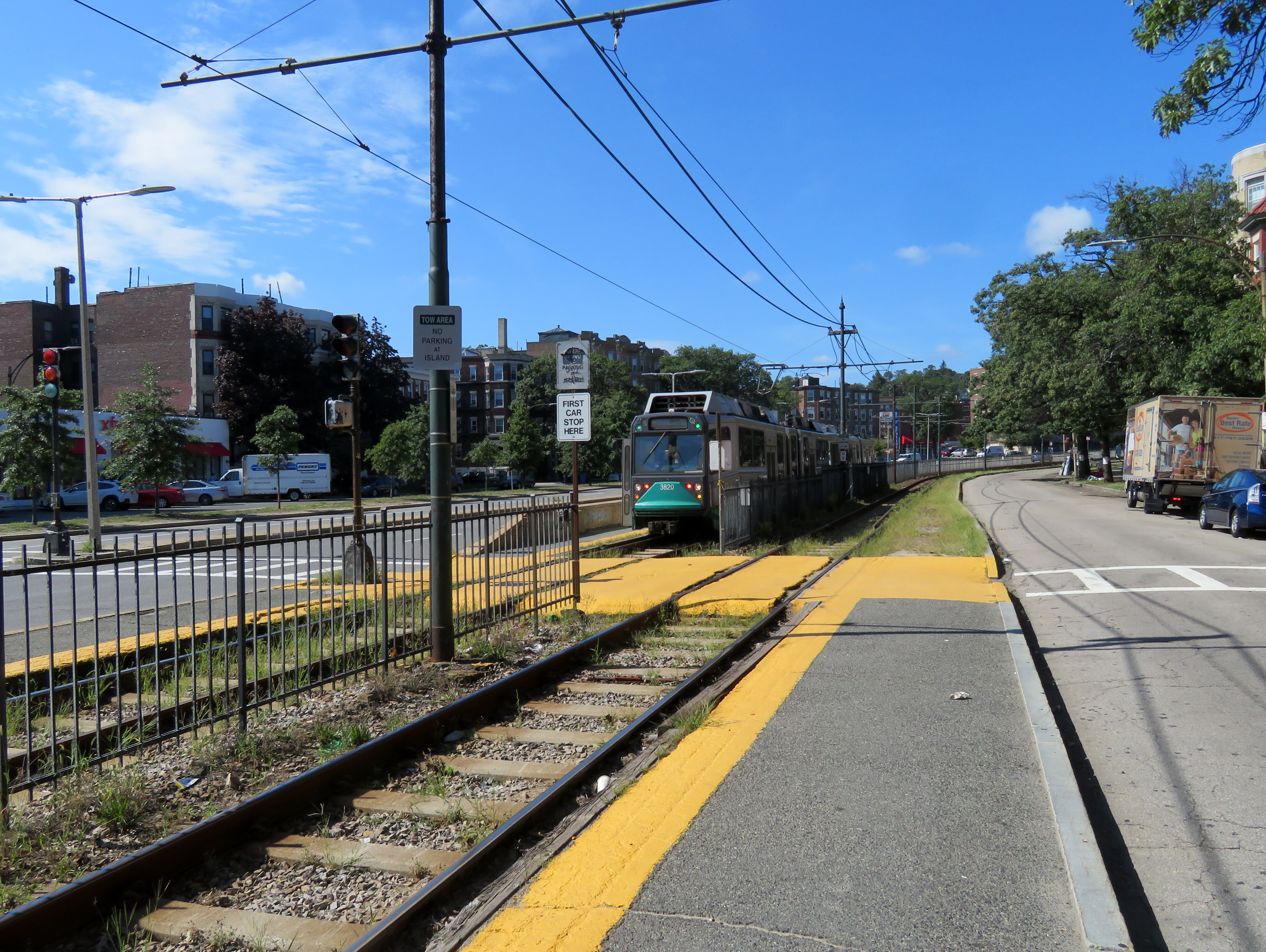
- An inbound train at Griggs Street station in 2018

General information
- Location: Commonwealth Avenue at Griggs Street; Allston, Boston, Massachusetts
- Coordinates: 42.34883°N 71.13439°W
- Platforms: 2 side platforms
- Tracks: 2

Construction
- Accessible: No

History
- Opened: May 26, 1900
- Rebuilt: 2027–2028 (planned)
- Former names: Griggs Street/Long Avenue

Passengers
- 2011: 1,203 daily boardings

Services
Preceding station	MBTA	Following station
Allston Street toward Boston College	Green Line B branch	Harvard Avenue toward Government Center
Location

Griggs Street station is a light rail station on the MBTA Green Line B branch, located between the southbound travel lanes and frontage road of Commonwealth Avenue at Griggs Street in Allston, Boston, Massachusetts. The station is not accessible. It has two side platforms, located on the near sides of a pedestrian crossing, to serve the line's two tracks. The station was called Griggs Street/Long Avenue until around 2017.

== Reconstruction ==
Track work in 2018–19, which included replacement of platform edges at several stops (not including Griggs Street), triggered requirements for accessibility modifications at those stops. Planning for modifications to five B Branch stops began in 2021. In 2024, Griggs Street and the other remaining non-accessible B Branch stops were added to the project. By July 2026, the MBTA expected to issue a $73 million design-build contract in August 2026, with construction lasting from mid-2027 to late 2028. Bids received were higher than expected. In October 2026, the MBTA indicated the project was being rescoped; the contract would be rebid and awarded in 2027, with construction lasting through 2028.
