= Harvard Avenue station =

Light rail station in Boston, Massachusetts, US

Harvard Avenue
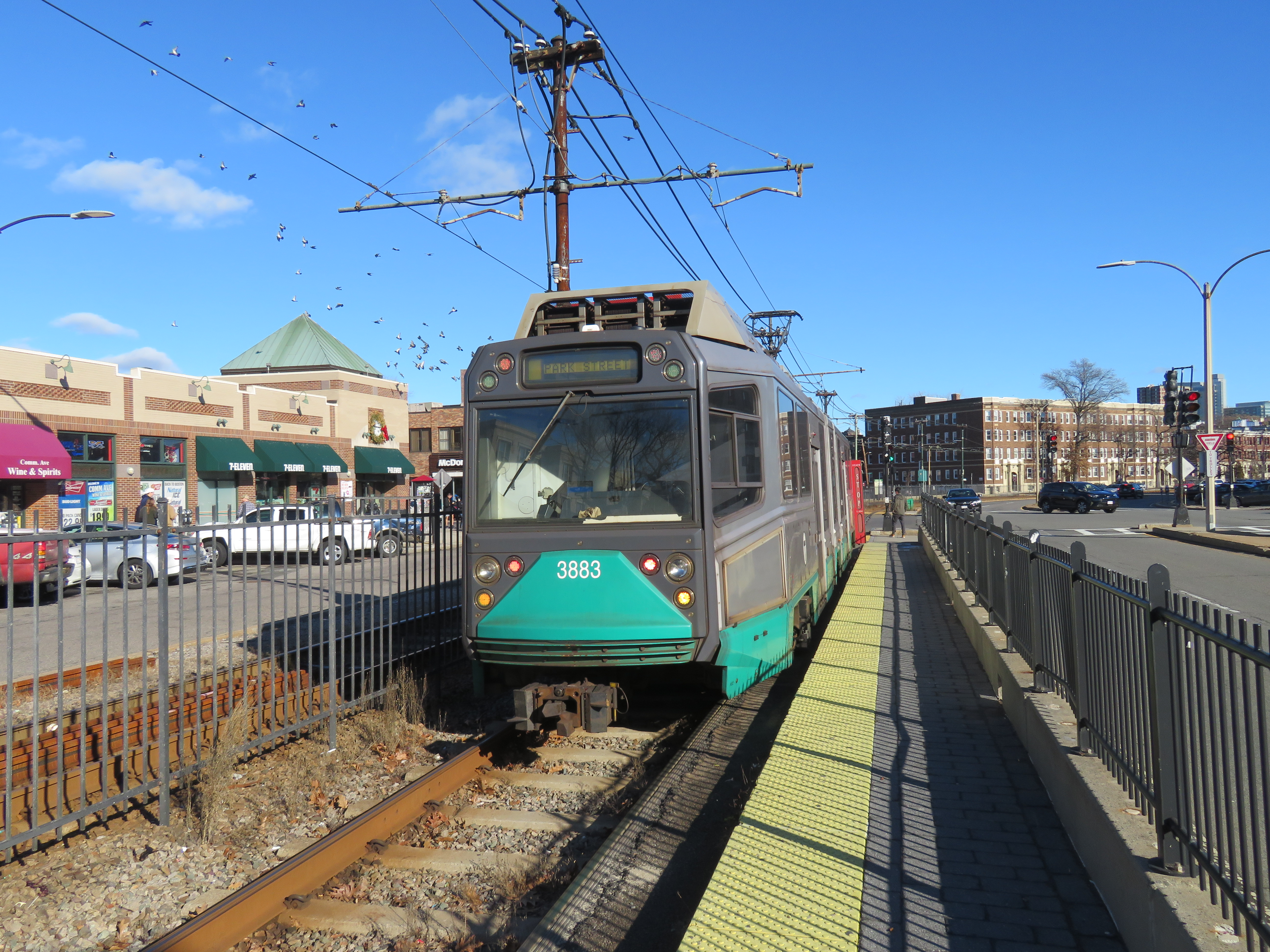
- An inbound train at Harvard Avenue station in December 2018

General information
- Location: Commonwealth Avenue at Harvard Avenue; Allston, Boston, Massachusetts
- Coordinates: 42.3504°N 71.1310°W
- Platforms: 2 side platforms
- Tracks: 2
- Connections: MBTA bus: 66

Construction
- Accessible: yes

History
- Rebuilt: November 2001–October 2002

Passengers
- 2011: 3,602 daily boardings

Services
Preceding station	MBTA	Following station
Griggs Street toward Boston College	Green Line B branch	Packards Corner toward Government Center
Former services
Preceding station	MBTA	Following station
Griggs Street toward Boston College	Green Line B branch	Fordham Road (station closed 2004) toward Government Center
Location

Harvard Avenue station is a light rail station on the MBTA Green Line B branch, located in the Allston neighborhood of Boston, Massachusetts. The station is located on the west side of Commonwealth Avenue at Harvard Avenue, in a residential and commercial district. The station consists of two side platforms, located on opposite sides of Harvard Avenue, which serve the B branch's two tracks. The station is fully accessible. Harvard Avenue is the second-busiest surface stop on the Green Line surface branches (behind only Longwood Medical Area) in a 2011 count, with an average of 3,602 boardings on weekdays.

== History ==
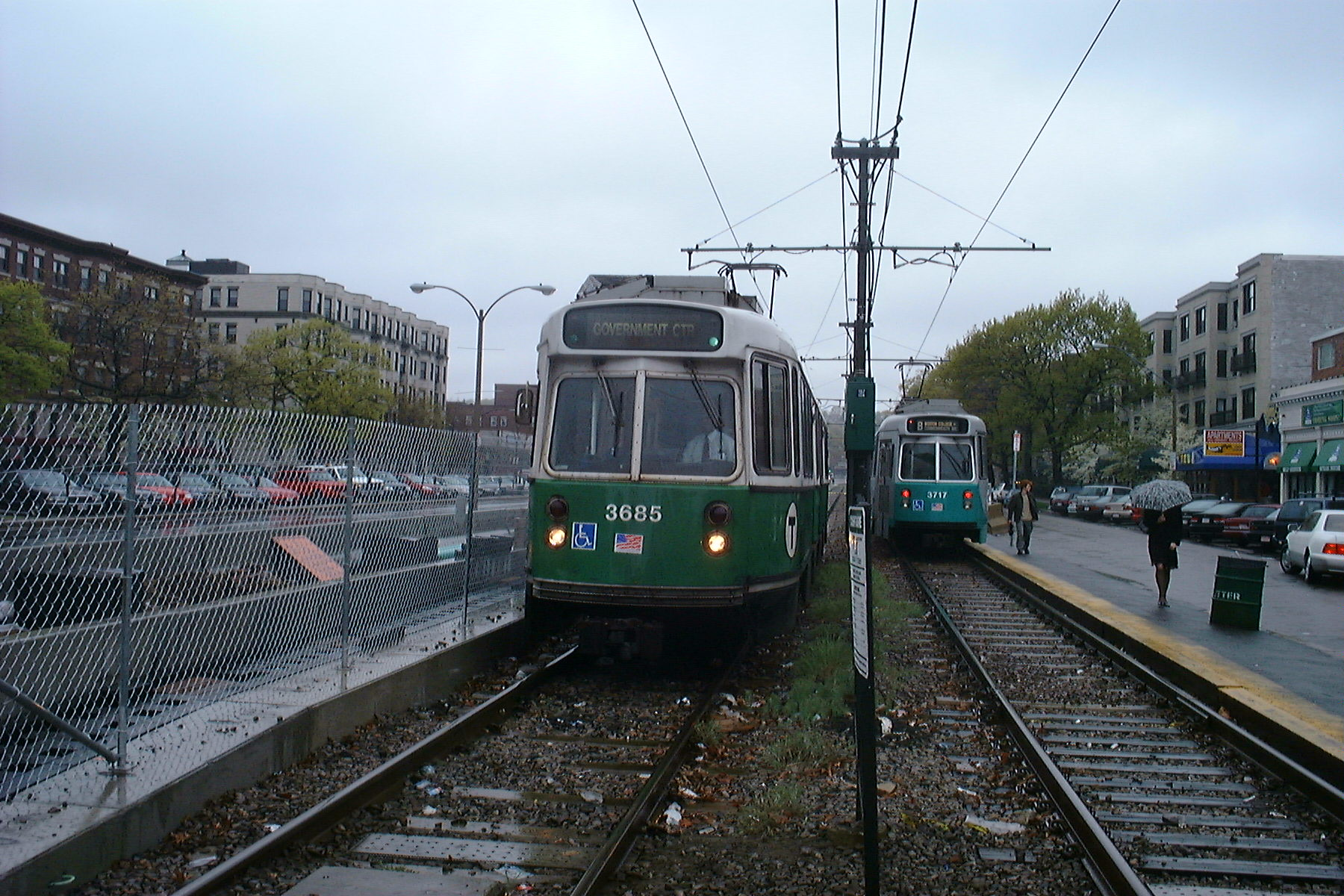
Reconstruction work in April 2002

Due to its high ridership, Harvard Avenue was one of the first Green Line surface stops to be made accessible. In the early 2000s, the MBTA modified key surface stops with raised platforms for accessibility. Portable lifts were installed at Harvard Avenue around 2000 as a temporary measure. The platform modifications - part of a $32 million modification of thirteen B, C, and E branch stations - began in November 2001, with completion of the project in October 2002. Delays in construction caused cascading delays to similar renovations at Boston University East and Boston University Central. During the construction work, temporary platforms were constructed on the opposite side of Harvard Avenue from their usual configuration.
