= Blandford Street station =

Light rail station in Boston, Massachusetts, US

Blandford Street
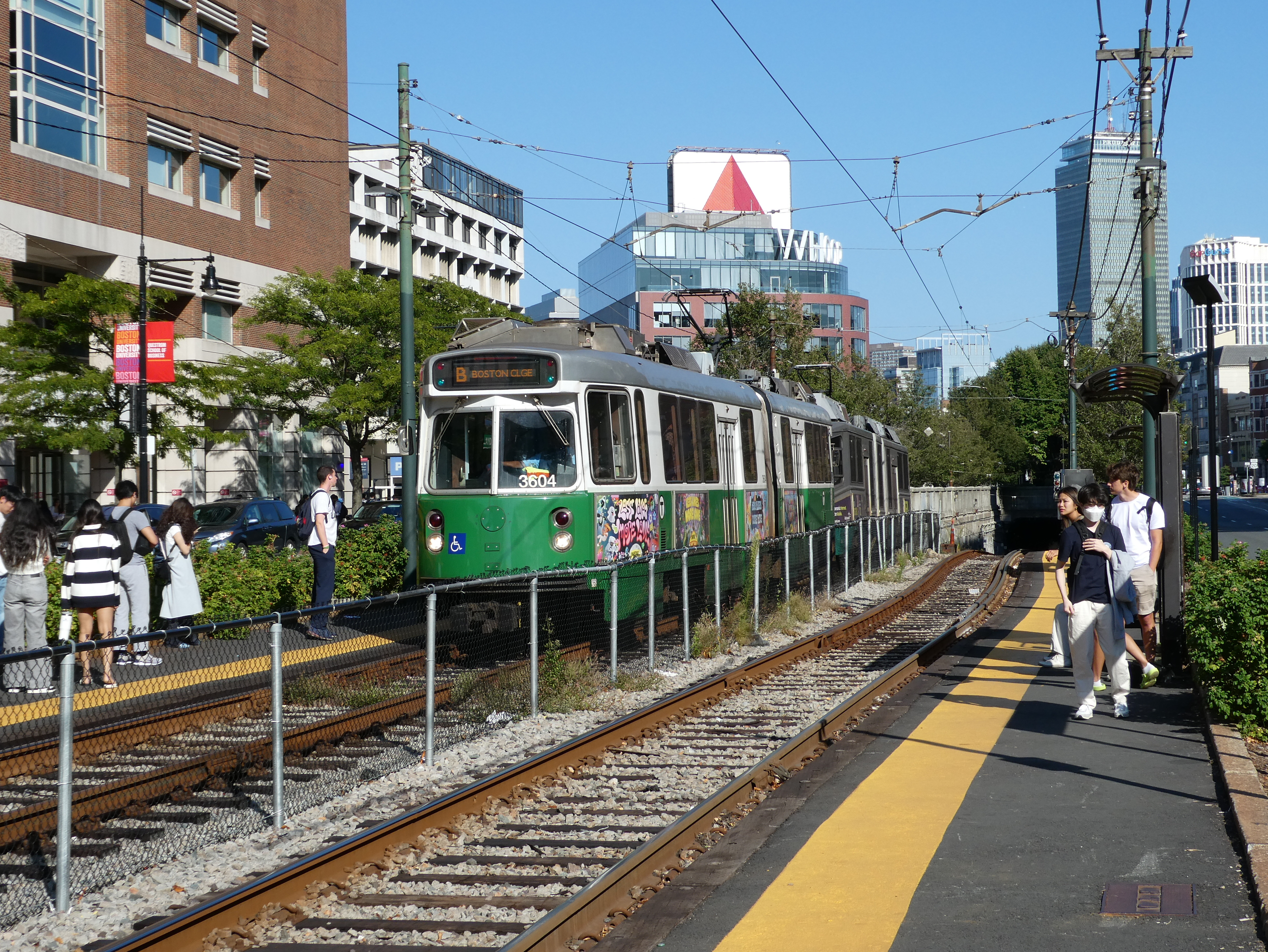
- An outbound train at Blandford Street station in 2024

General information
- Location: Commonwealth Avenue at Silber Way; Boston, Massachusetts
- Coordinates: 42.34922°N 71.10003°W
- Platforms: 2 side platforms
- Tracks: 2
- Connections: MBTA bus: 57

Construction
- Accessible: No

History
- Opened: 1896
- Closed: 2027 or 2028 (planned)

Passengers
- 2011: 1,540 daily boardings

Services
Preceding station	MBTA	Following station
Boston University East toward Boston College	Green Line B branch	Kenmore toward Government Center
Former services
Preceding station	MBTA	Following station
Boston University East toward Watertown	Green Line A branch Discontinued 1969	Kenmore toward Park Street
Location

Blandford Street station is a surface-level light rail station on the MBTA's Green Line B branch located in Boston, Massachusetts. The station is located in the center median of Commonwealth Avenue at Silber Way and Blandford Mall, about 2 blocks west of Kenmore Square, near the east end of Boston University. The station consists of two low side platforms, which serve the B branch's two tracks. The station is the first station outbound on the B branch after it splits off from the C and D branches at Kenmore.

Blandford Street is the seventh-busiest surface stop on the B branch, averaging 1,540 boardings per weekday in 2011. The MBTA plans to close the stop by 2028 because it would not be possible to make it accessible.

== History ==
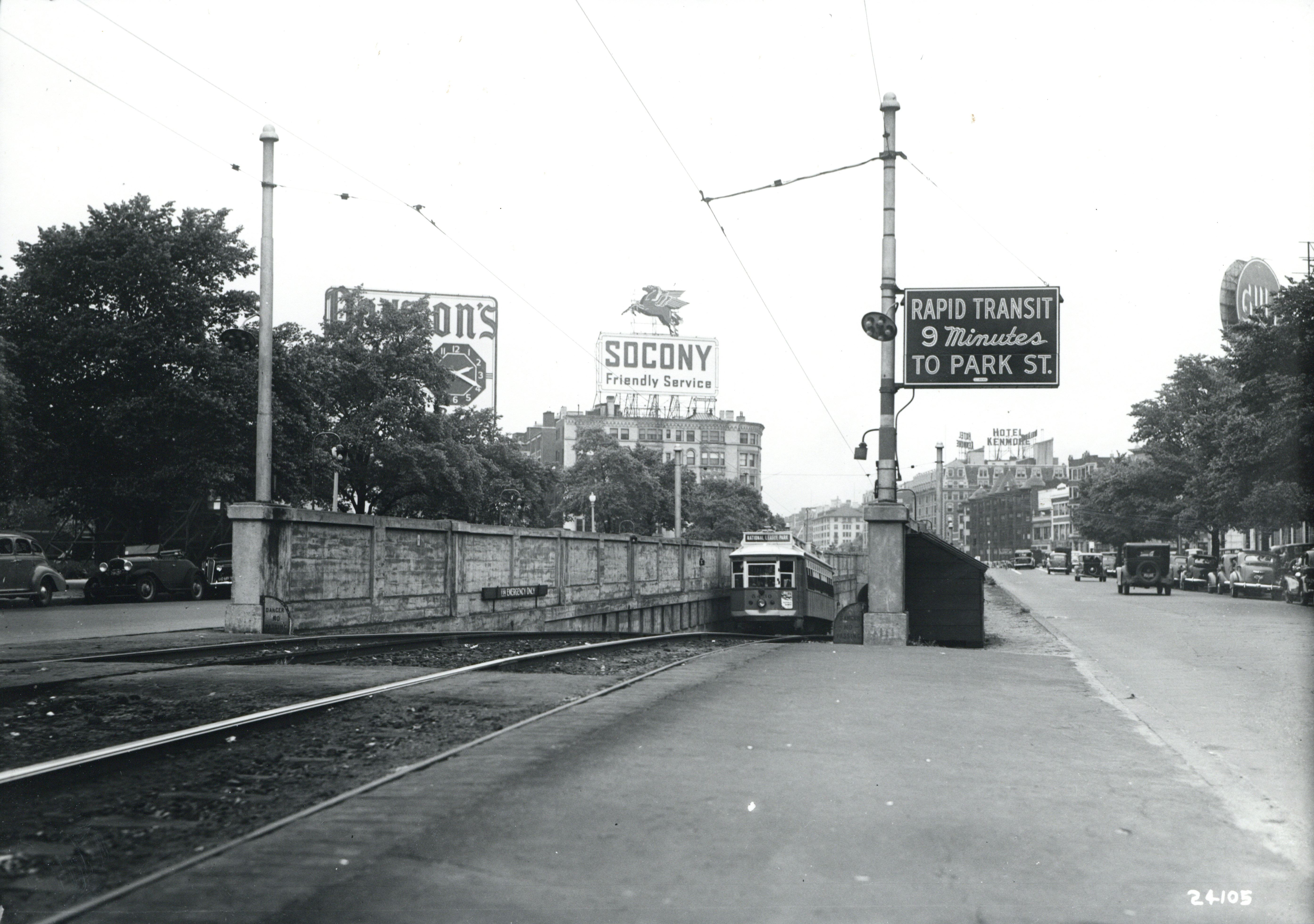
An outbound car exits the Blandford Street Portal bound for Braves Field in 1943

The Commonwealth Avenue line was originally served by surface streetcars beginning in 1896 as part of what would later become the Green Line A branch. On October 3, 1914, the Boylston Street subway was opened to the Kenmore Portal just east of Kenmore Square, allowing streetcars to enter and run underground into the Tremont Street subway. In October 1932, Kenmore station was built, and the modern Blandford Street Portal was built just east of Blandford Street.

The name "Blandford Street" for the station is an anachronism. The street, along with Cummington and Hinsdale streets, was bought by Boston University in June 2012 for use as a pedestrian mall. On July 30, 2012, BU closed these roadways to most automobile traffic and renamed Blandford Street as Blandford Mall. However, the station is still named Blandford Street.

Track work in 2018–19, which included replacement of platform edges at several stops (not including Blandford Street), triggered requirements for accessibility modifications at those stops. In March 2024, the MBTA indicated that it was considering future consolidation of Blandford Street and Boston University East into a single station. By June, the MBTA included Blandford Street in plans to make the remaining B Branch stops accessible. However, in December 2024, the agency indicated it would instead close Blandford Street by 2027 because it would not be feasible to build accessible platforms long enough for two-car trains of future new Type 10 vehicles.

By July 2026, the MBTA expected to issue a $73 million design-build contract in August 2026, with construction lasting from mid-2027 to late 2028. Bids received were higher than expected. In October 2026, the MBTA indicated the project was being rescoped; the contract would be rebid and awarded in 2027, with construction lasting through 2028.

=== Pocket track ===
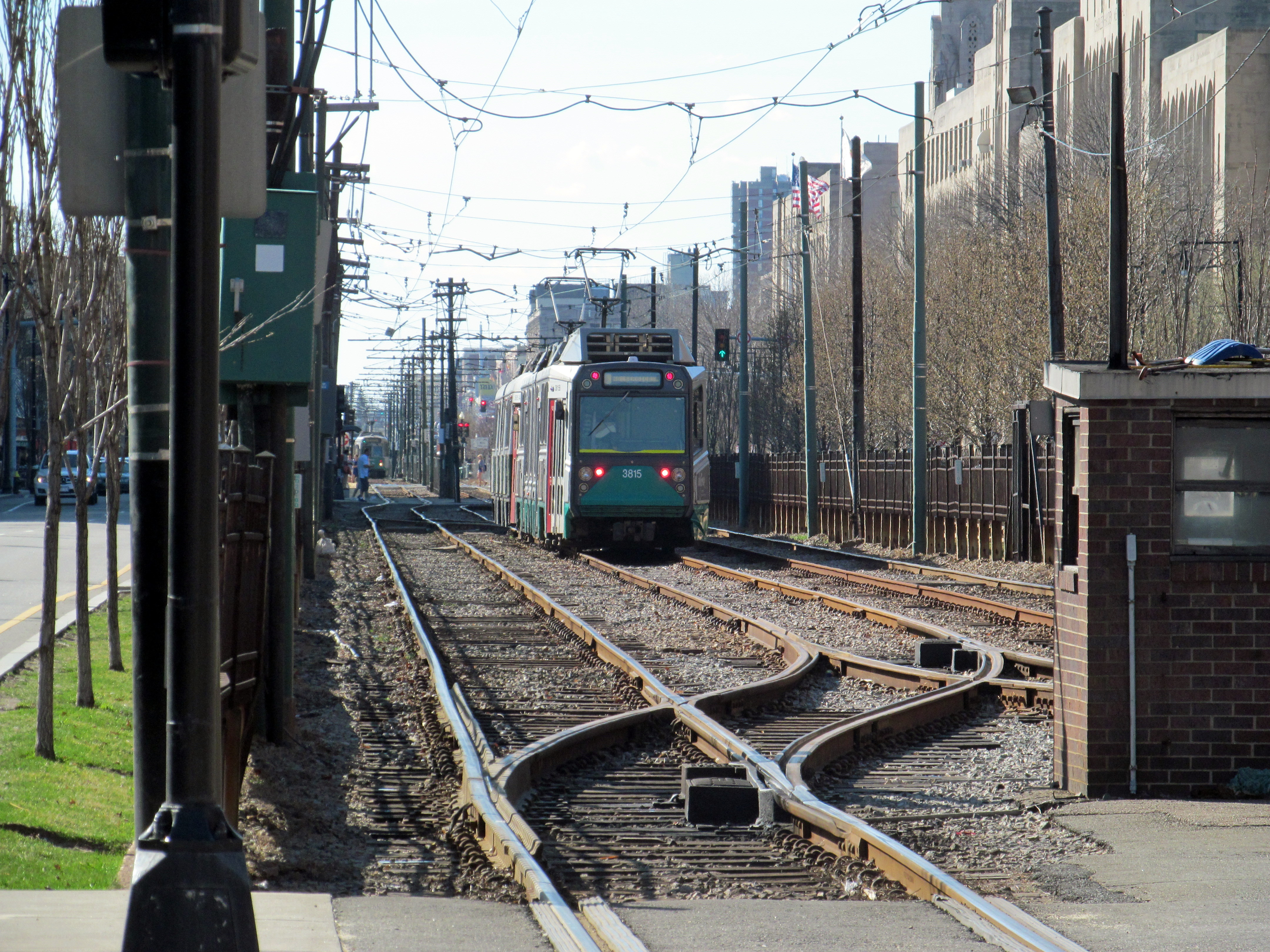
A train sitting on the pocket track

A pocket track just west of the station between Blandford Mall and Granby Street is used for several operational purposes. Neither the C nor D branches have similar pocket tracks, so the Blandford Street pocket track is a primary location to store trains on the west end of the Central Subway without blocking revenue service tracks. The pocket track opened on June 30, 1931, replacing a former surface crossover at Kenmore Square.

It is frequently used as a layover point for trains during the middle of the day and overnight, and to temporarily store disabled cars. During Red Sox games and other major events at Fenway Park, extra trains are stored on the pocket track to provide extra service from Kenmore to Park Street to handle exiting crowds. An experimental four-car post-game train was operated on April 9, 2011, using the track as a staging point.

The pocket track is also used to short turn westbound service from the central subway, such as when the B branch is not operating due to maintenance, accidents, or weather conditions. Run as Directed (RAD) trains, which provide additional capacity in the subway during peak periods, often operate from Blandford Street. RAD service began on January 1, 1977 and was intensified from July 24, 1982 to September 10, 1982 when the C branch was closed for maintenance. During the closure of the Huntington Avenue subway, beginning December 28, 1985, regular scheduled service was run between Blandford Street and Lechmere. On July 26, 1986 this reverted to RAD service, which was intensified on December 26, 1986 with use of other cutbacks (which, unlike Blandford Street, do not have pocket tracks). RAD service was greatly reduced on September 10, 1988, but increased again from Blandford Street on September 1, 2008.
