= Tappan Street station =

Light rail station in Brookline, Massachusetts, US

Tappan Street
- The station in October 2026 during reconstruction work

General information
- Location: Beacon Street at Tappan Street; Brookline, Massachusetts
- Coordinates: 42.33852°N 71.13852°W
- Platforms: 2 side platforms
- Tracks: 2

Construction
- Accessible: Yes

History
- Rebuilt: 2026

Passengers
- 2011: 674 daily boardings

Services
Preceding station	MBTA	Following station
Dean Road toward Cleveland Circle	Green Line C branch	Washington Square toward Government Center
Location

Tappan Street station is a light rail stop on the Green Line C branch of the MBTA subway system, located in the median of Beacon Street east of Tappan Street in Brookline, Massachusetts. The station consists of two side platforms which serve the C branch's two tracks. Tappan Street station is accessible, with raised platforms to accommodate low-floor light rail vehicles.

== Reconstruction ==
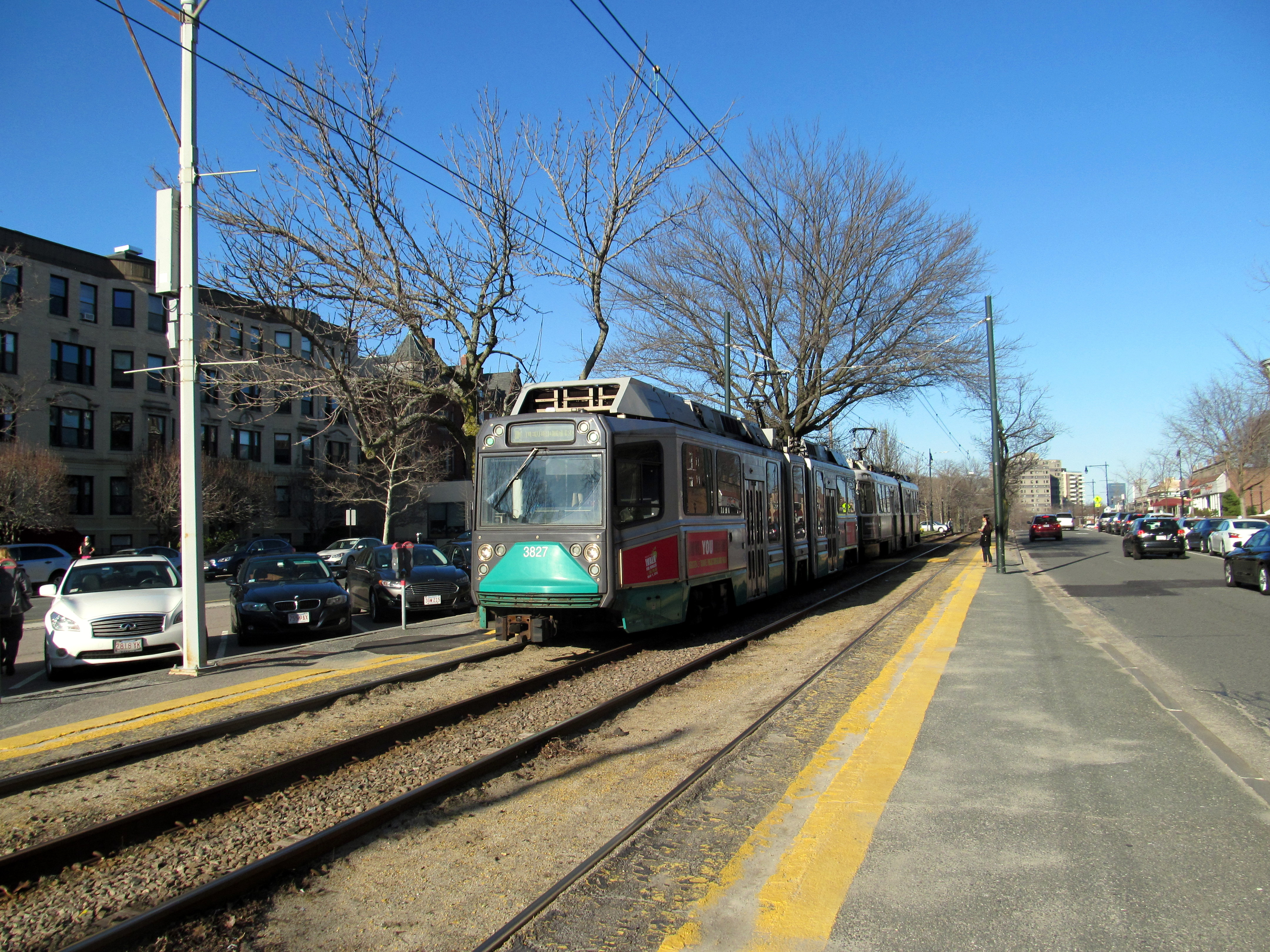
Tappan Street station in 2016, prior to reconstruction

Track work in 2018–19, which included replacement of platform edges at several stops, triggered requirements for accessibility modifications at those stops. Design work for Tappan Street and seven other C Branch stations was 15% complete by December 2022. Designs shown in February 2024 called for the Tappan Street platforms to be widened and rebuilt at their current locations.

In May 2024, the Federal Transit Administration awarded the MBTA $67 million to construct accessible platforms at 14 B and C branch stops including Tappan Street. The MBTA awarded a $41.9 million design-build contract in April 2025. Design work for Tappan Street and Englewood Avenue was complete by September 2025, with the Tappan Street platforms to be widened and rebuilt at their current locations.

By March 2026, reconstruction of Tappan Street station was expected to last from April to July 2026. Tappan Street and Englewood Avenue were planned to be the first stations in the project to be completed. Construction began during a shutdown of the C Branch on May 6–17, 2026. The station remained closed for reconstruction: the inbound platform reopened on June 29 (eight days later than planned), and the outbound platform reopened on July 18. This made the station accessible, though some items like signage, railings, shelters, and trees were installed later. The rebuilt platforms are 8 inches (200 mm) high for compatibility with the folding doors of existing rolling stock. They will be raised to 14 inches (360 mm) for level boarding once Type 10 LRVs replace existing Green Line vehicles.
