= Dean Road station =

Light rail station in Brookline, Massachusetts, US

Dean Road
- Dean Road station in November 2026

General information
- Location: Beacon Street at Dean Road / Corey Road; Brookline, Massachusetts
- Coordinates: 42.33762°N 71.14249°W
- Platforms: 2 side platforms
- Tracks: 2

Construction
- Accessible: Yes

History
- Rebuilt: 2026

Passengers
- 2011: 398 daily boardings

Services
Preceding station	MBTA	Following station
Englewood Avenue toward Cleveland Circle	Green Line C branch	Tappan Street toward Government Center
Location

Dean Road station is a light rail stop on the Green Line C branch of the MBTA subway system, located in the median of Beacon Street in Brookline, Massachusetts. The station has two side platforms serving the C branch's two tracks. Dean Road station is accessible, with raised platforms to accommodate low-floor light rail vehicles.

== Reconstruction ==
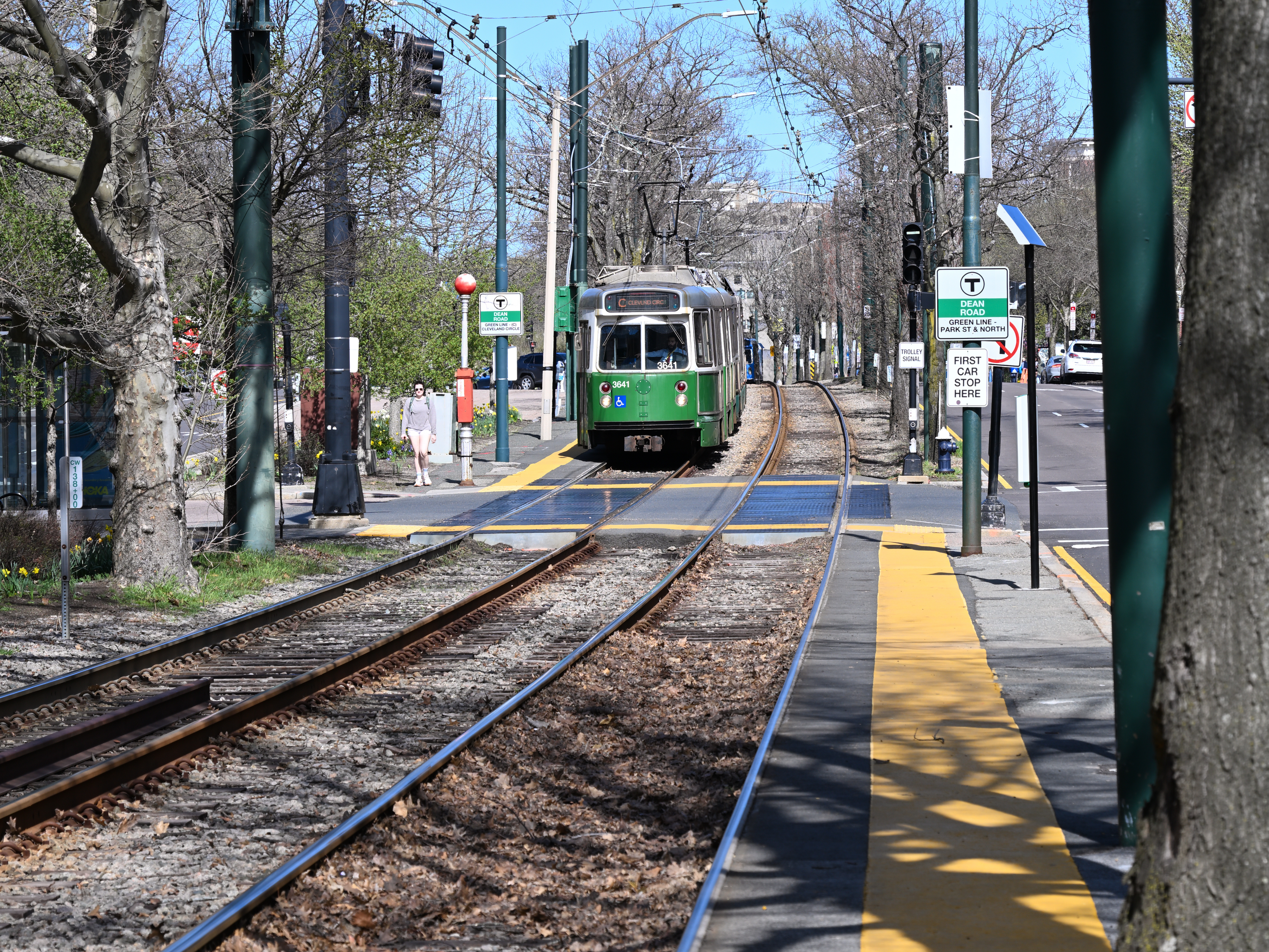
Dean Road station in 2025 prior to reconstruction

Track work in 2018–19, which included replacement of platform edges at several stops, triggered requirements for accessibility modifications at those stops. Dean Road was the only non-accessible C Branch stop not included in these plans. Designs shown in February 2024 included Dean Road and called for both platforms to be shifted to the far side of the intersection. In May 2024, the Federal Transit Administration awarded the MBTA $67 million to construct accessible platforms at 14 B and C branch stops including Dean Road.

The MBTA awarded a $41.9 million design-build contract in April 2025. Designs shown in February 2026 called for only the outbound platform to be moved to the far side; the inbound platform would be rebuilt at its existing location. By March 2026, preliminary construction work was expected to take place in April and May 2026, followed by main construction from July to September 2026.

Construction began during a shutdown of the C Branch on May 6–17, 2026. The inbound platform was closed from September 14 to October 9, 2026, for reconstruction. This made the station accessible. The rebuilt platforms are 8 inches (200 mm) high for compatibility with the folding doors of existing rolling stock. They will be raised to 14 inches (360 mm) for level boarding once Type 10 LRVs replace existing Green Line vehicles.
