= Fordham Road station (MBTA) =

Former light rail station in Boston

Fordham Road
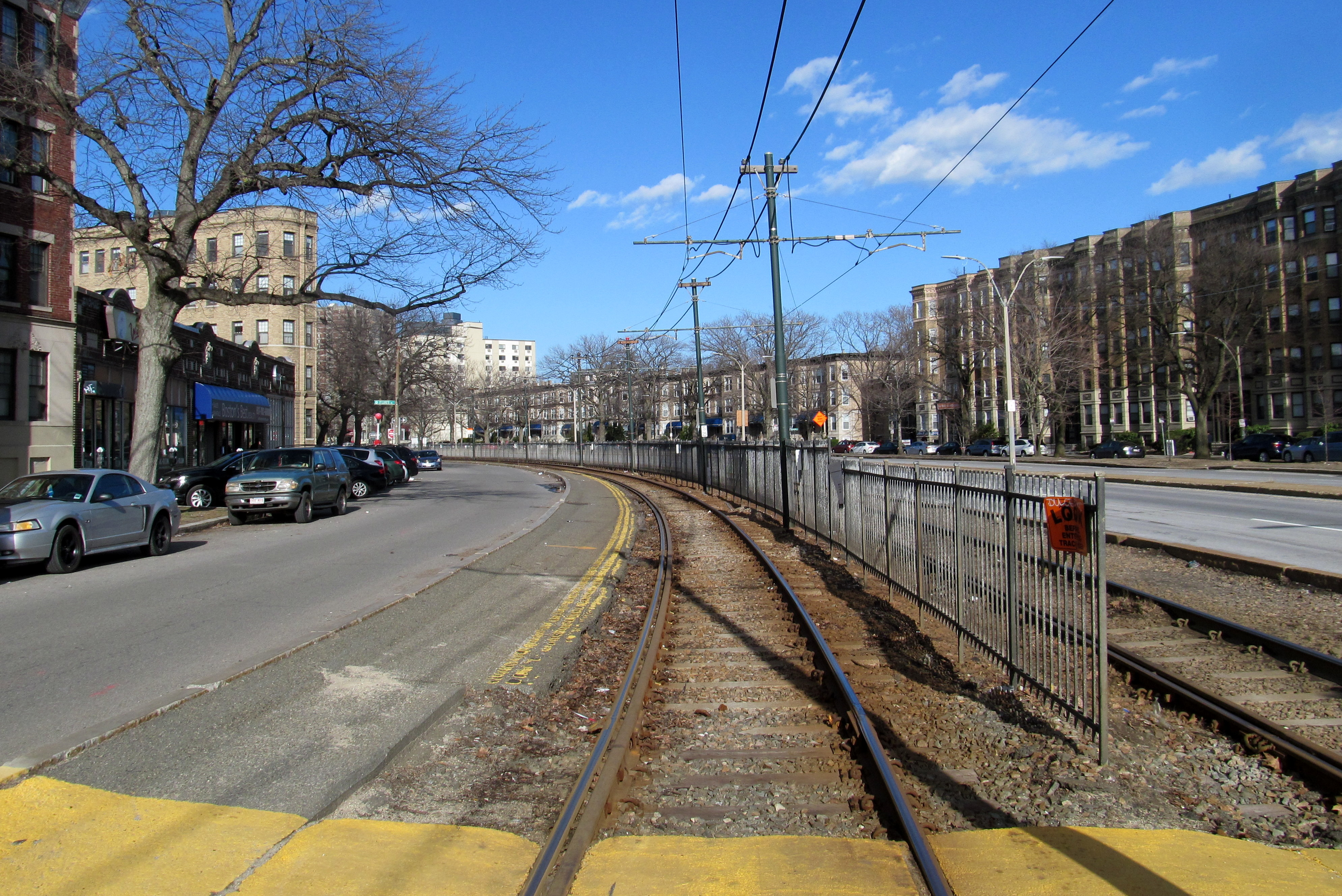
- The former outbound platform in April 2017

General information
- Location: Commonwealth Avenue at Fordham Road; Allston, Boston, Massachusetts
- Coordinates: 42.350564°N 71.128047°W
- Platforms: 2 side platforms
- Tracks: 2

History
- Closed: April 20, 2004

Passengers
- 1995: 921 (weekday average boardings)

Former services
Preceding station	MBTA	Following station
Harvard Avenue toward Boston College	Green Line B branch	Packards Corner toward Government Center
Location

Fordham Road station was a light rail stop on the MBTA Green Line B branch, located in the median of Commonwealth Avenue at Fordham Road in Allston, Boston, Massachusetts. The stop had two side platforms, each located before the pedestrian crossing at Fordham Road. It was closed in 2004 as part of an effort to speed up travel times on the line.

== History ==
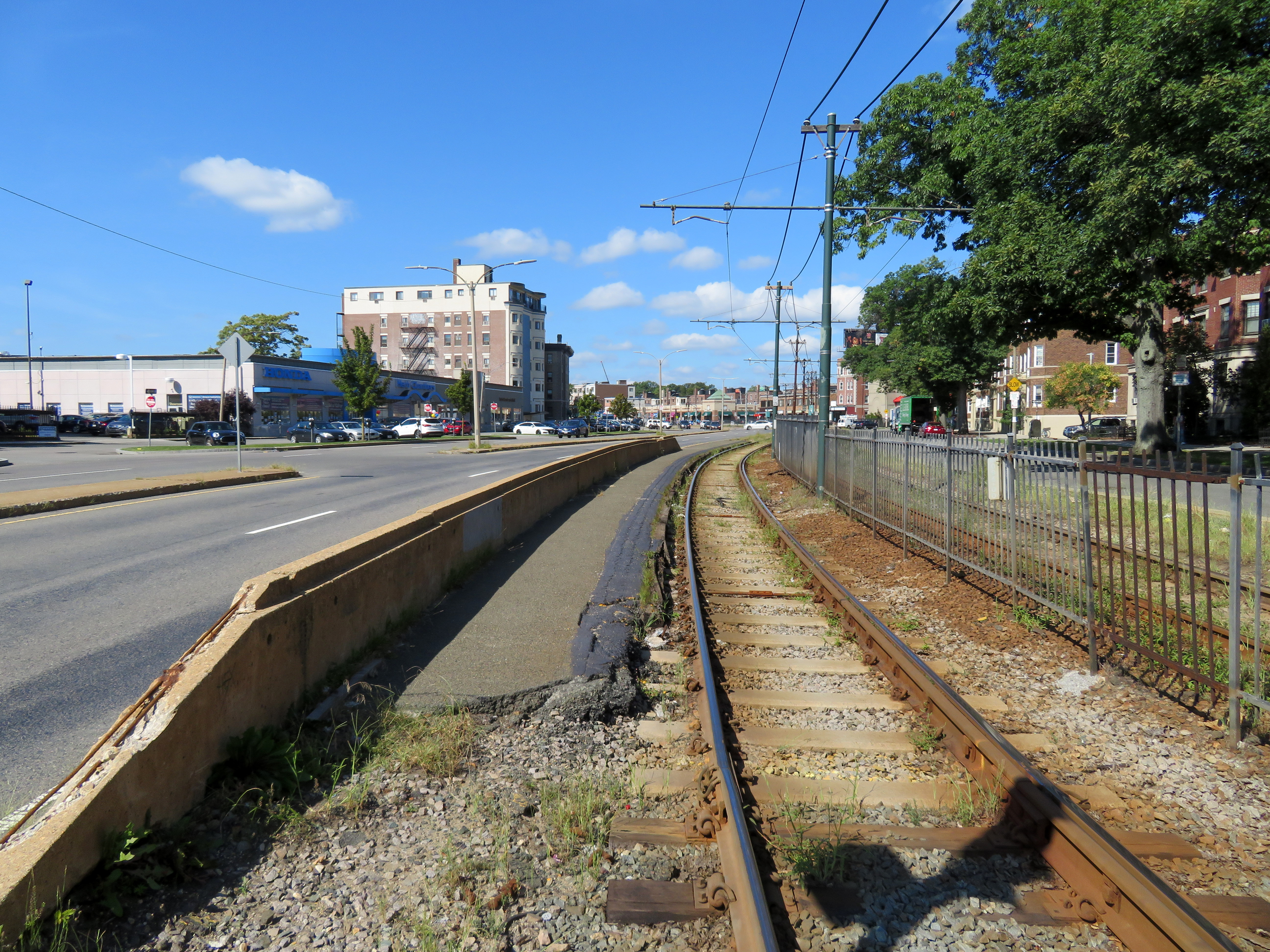
The abandoned inbound platform in 2018

In 2003, Fordham Road was one of five stops on the B branch proposed for closure to speed up travel on the line. The stops were chosen for their low average daily ridership and proximity to stops with higher ridership. In a 1995 count, Fordham Road had averaged 921 daily boardings compared to 1,521 at Packards Corner and 4,077 at Harvard Avenue station, both of which were less than 0.2 miles (0.32 km) away. Chiswick Road was dropped from the proposal shortly after it was announced, but the other four stops - Fordham Road, Summit Avenue, Mount Hood Road, and Greycliff Road - were provisionally closed on April 20, 2004. On March 15, 2005, after a survey showed that 73% of 1,142 riders surveyed approved of the closures, the MBTA board voted to make the closures permanent.
