= Englewood Avenue station =

Light rail station in Brookline, Massachusetts, US

Englewood Avenue
- The nearly-complete outbound platform in September 2026

General information
- Location: Beacon Street at Englewood Avenue; Brookline, Massachusetts
- Coordinates: 42.33699°N 71.14559°W
- Platforms: 2 side platforms
- Tracks: 2

Construction
- Accessible: Yes

History
- Rebuilt: 2026

Passengers
- 2011: 555 daily boardings

Services
Preceding station	MBTA	Following station
Cleveland Circle Terminus	Green Line C branch	Dean Road toward Government Center
Location

Englewood Avenue station is a light rail stop on the Green Line C branch of the MBTA subway system, located in the median of Beacon Street at Englewood Avenue in Brookline, Massachusetts. The station has two low side platforms which serve the C branch's two tracks. Englewood Avenue station is accessible, with raised platforms to accommodate low-floor light rail vehicles.

== Reconstruction ==
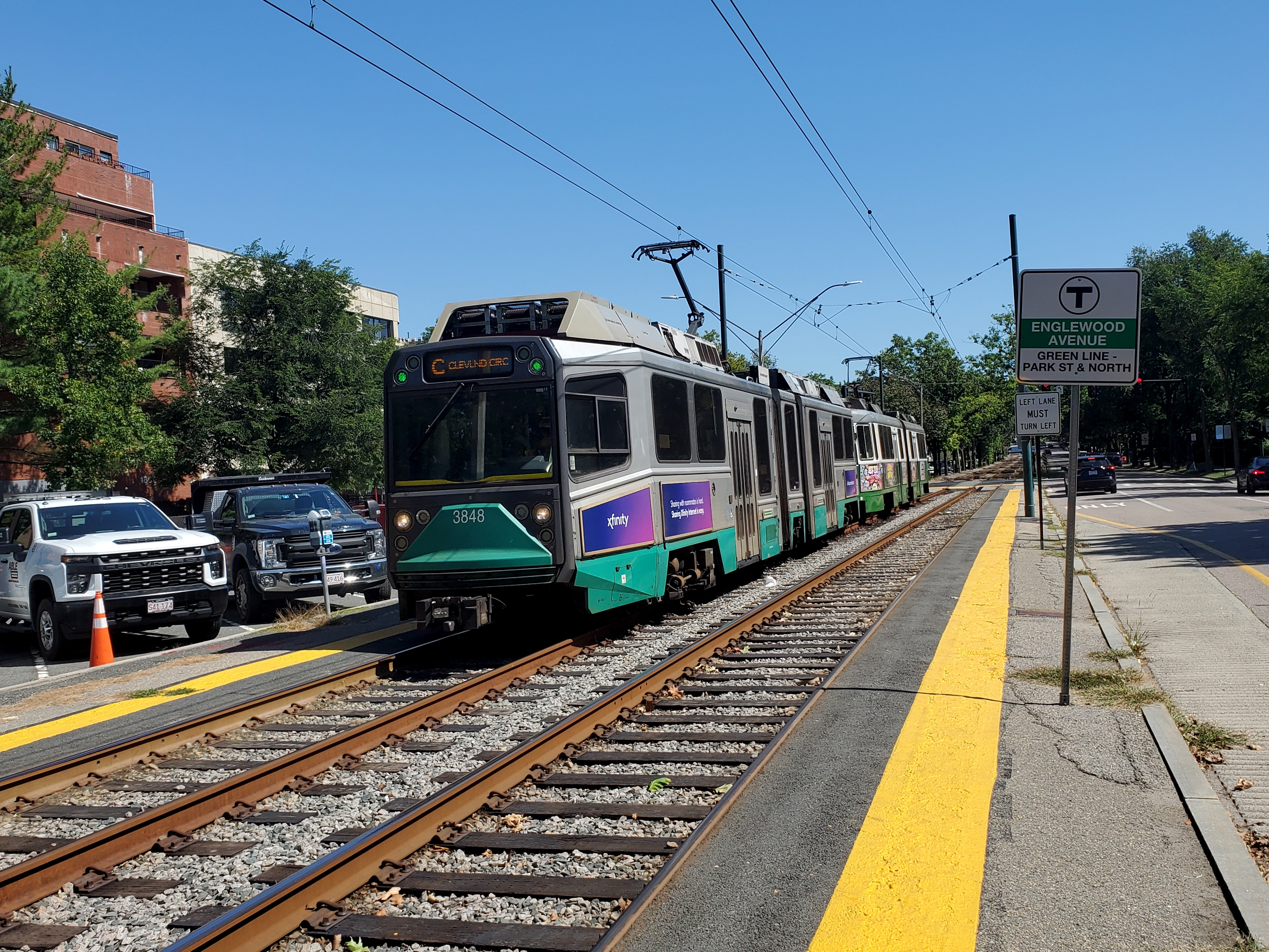
An outbound train at the station in 2024, prior to reconstruction

Track work in 2018–19, which included replacement of platform edges at several stops, triggered requirements for accessibility modifications at those stops. Design work for Englewood Avenue and seven other C Branch stations was 15% complete by December 2022. Designs shown in February 2024 called for the inbound platform to be shifted to the east side of the intersection.

In May 2024, the Federal Transit Administration awarded the MBTA $67 million to construct accessible platforms at 14 B and C branch stops including Tappan Street. The MBTA awarded a $41.9 million design-build contract in April 2025. Design work for Tappan Street and Englewood Avenue station was complete by September 2025.

By March 2026, reconstruction of Englewood Avenue station was expected to last from April to July 2026. Tappan Street and Englewood Avenue were planned to be the first stations in the project to be completed. Construction began during a shutdown of the C Branch on May 6–17, 2026. The outbound platform remained closed for reconstruction and reopened on July 18. This made the station accessible, though some items like signage, railings, shelters, and trees were installed later. The rebuilt platforms are 8 inches (200 mm) high for compatibility with the folding doors of existing rolling stock. They will be raised to 14 inches (360 mm) for level boarding once Type 10 LRVs replace existing Green Line vehicles.
