= House at 156 Mason Terrace =

Historic house in Massachusetts, United States

- U.S. National Register of Historic Places
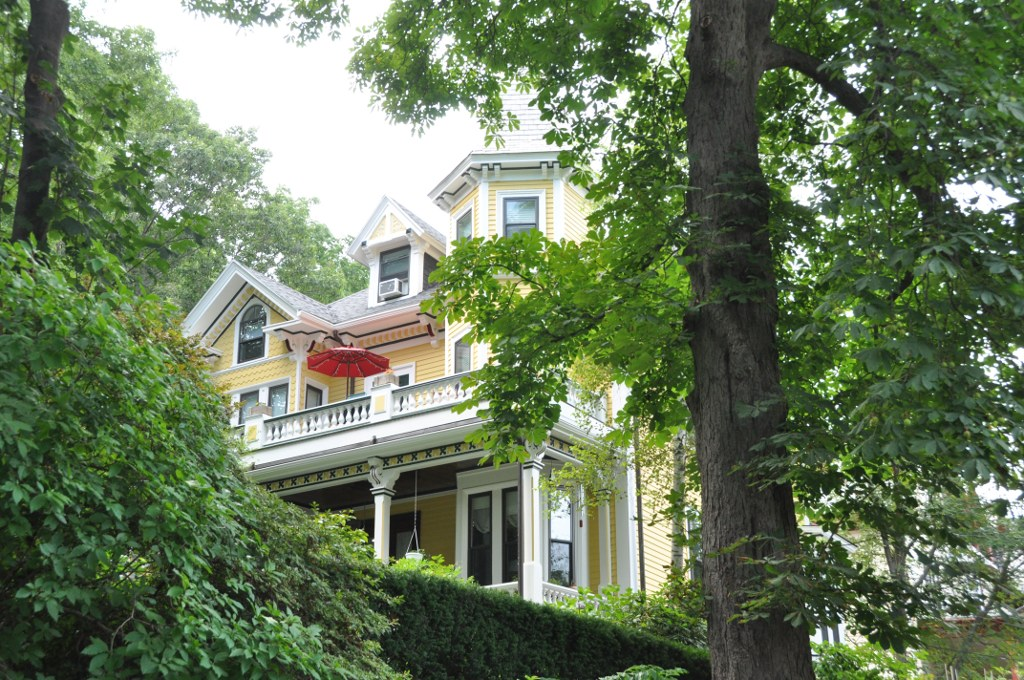

- Location within Massachusetts Location within the United States
- Location: 156 Mason Terr., Brookline, Massachusetts
- Coordinates: 42°20′33″N 71°7′47″W
- Built: 1888
- Architectural style: Stick/Eastlake, Queen Anne
- MPS: Brookline MRA
- NRHP reference No.: 85003283
- Added to NRHP: October 17, 1985

The House at 156 Mason Terrace in Brookline, Massachusetts, is one of the most elaborately decorated houses on Corey Hill. The 2–1/2 story wood-frame house was built c. 1888–90, and has classic Queen Anne and Stick style details, including a turret with polygonal roof, porch with Stick decorations, and the variety of gables and projecting sections that typify Queen Anne styling. The house was built on land owned by Thomas Griggs, and was in 1890 sold to James Dunbar, a judge.

The house was listed on the National Register of Historic Places in 1985.

== See also ==
- National Register of Historic Places listings in Brookline, Massachusetts
