= Museum of Fine Arts station (MBTA) =

Light rail station in Boston, Massachusetts, US

Museum of Fine Arts
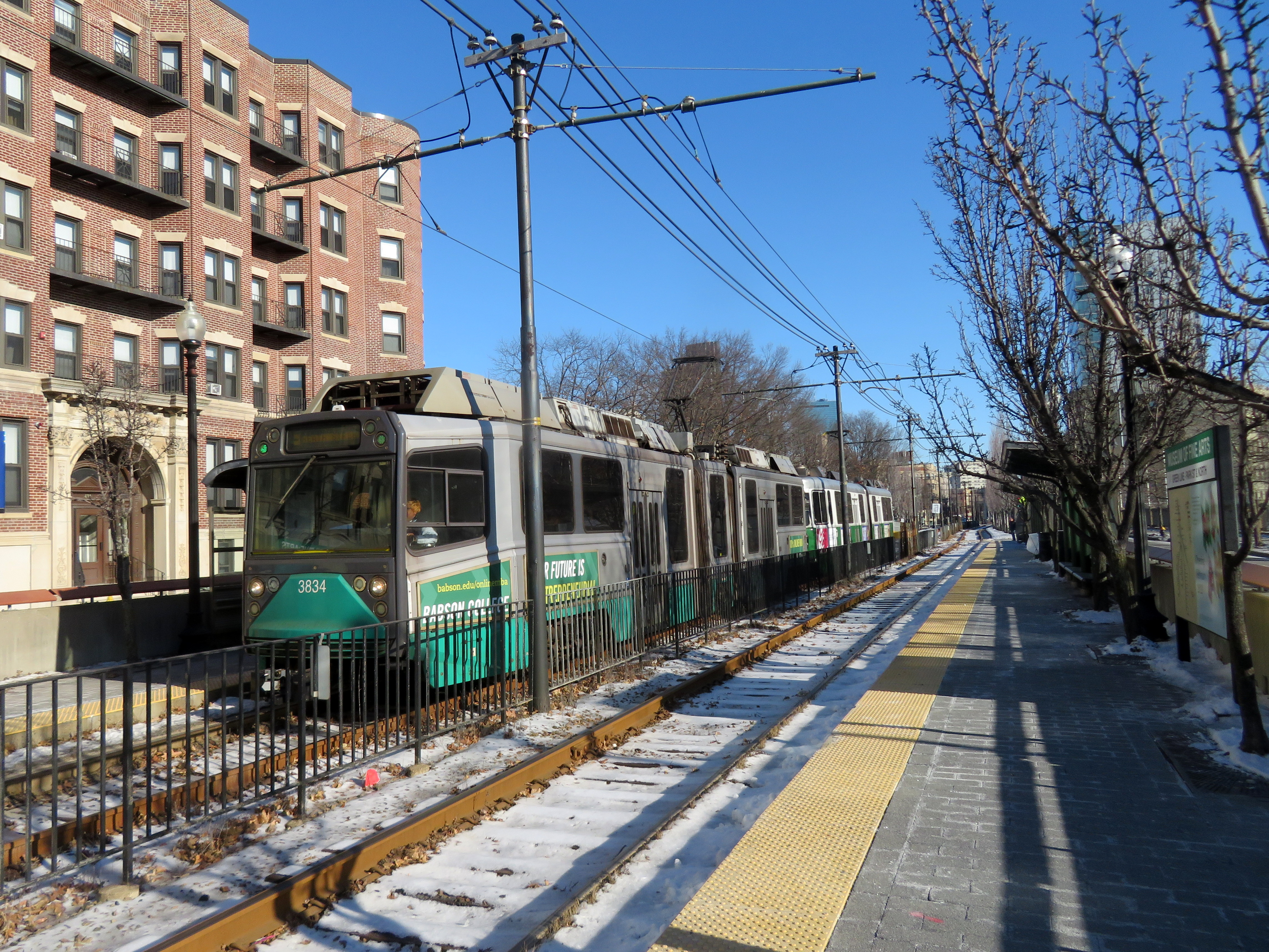
- An outbound train at Museum of Fine Arts station in 2019

General information
- Location: Huntington Avenue at Ruggles Street; Boston, Massachusetts
- Coordinates: 42.33796°N 71.09495°W
- Platforms: 2 side platforms
- Tracks: 2
- Connections: MBTA bus: 8, 19, 39, 47, 85, CT3

Construction
- Accessible: Yes

History
- Rebuilt: 2001–January 13, 2003
- Former names: Ruggles Street, Ruggles-Museum, Museum, Museum/Ruggles

Passengers
- 2011: 1,683 daily boardings

Services
Preceding station	MBTA	Following station
Longwood Medical Area toward Heath Street	Green Line E branch	Northeastern University toward Medford/Tufts
Location

Museum of Fine Arts is a surface-level light rail stop on the MBTA Green Line E branch, located the median of Huntington Avenue in Boston, Massachusetts, between Museum Road and Ruggles Street. The station is named after the adjacent Museum of Fine Arts, although it also provides access to Northeastern University, Wentworth Institute of Technology, and the Isabella Stewart Gardner Museum. Museum of Fine Arts station is accessible.

== History ==
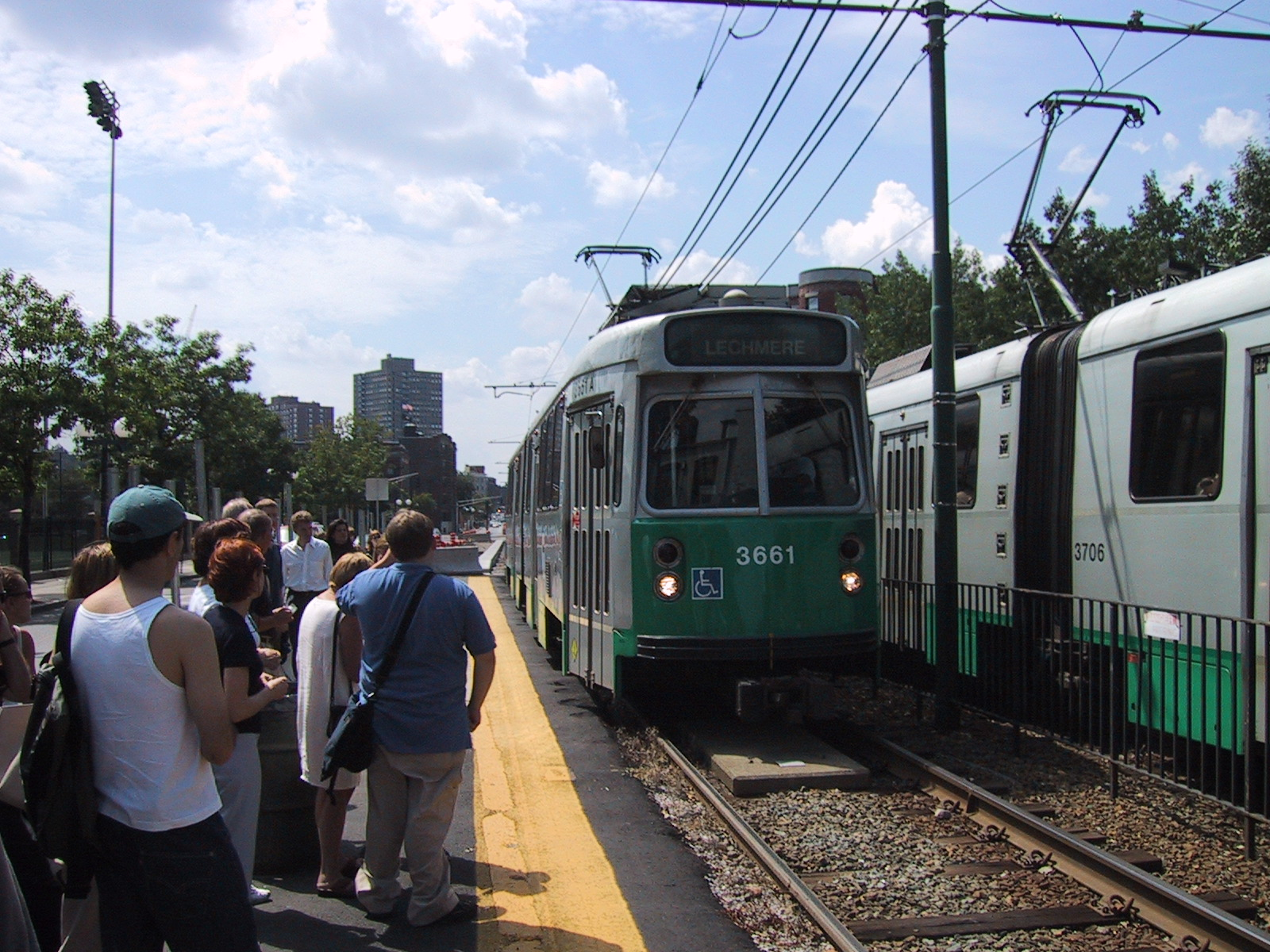
Temporary station in 2001 used during construction of the accessible station

Until the completion of the Huntington Avenue subway from Copley to a portal near Opera Place on February 16, 1941, streetcars ran on the surface from the Boylston Street portal. Like other surface stops on the median-reservation section of the line, Ruggles Street station had bare asphalt platforms. In 1972, the MBTA began planning a reconstruction of that section of the line, then scheduled for 1973–74. The work was eventually done in 1980, when the line was closed to modify the track and wires for the new LRVs. The line was cut back to Symphony on March 21, 1980; it was re-extended to Northeastern (using LRVs) on June 21 and Brigham Circle on September 20.

The station was originally known as Ruggles Street or Ruggles–Museum. After nearby Ruggles station opened in 1987, the station was called Museum (sometimes Museum/Ruggles). The name was changed to Museum of Fine Arts in the 1990s.

In the early 2000s, the MBTA modified key surface stops with raised platforms for accessibility as part of the Light Rail Accessibility Program. Portable lifts were installed at Museum of Fine Arts around 2000 as a temporary measure. The platforms were later lengthened and repaved with concrete; temporary platforms to the northeast were used during the renovations. That renovation – part of a $32 million modification of thirteen B, C, and E branch stations – was completed on January 13, 2003. Around 2006, the MBTA added a wooden mini-high platform on the outbound side, allowing level boarding on older Type 7 LRVs. These platforms were installed at eight Green Line stations in 2006–07 as part of the settlement of Joanne Daniels-Finegold, et al. v. MBTA.
