= Northeast (disambiguation) =

Northeast is a compass point.

Northeast, north-east, north east, northeastern or north-eastern or north eastern may also refer to:

- Northeast (direction), an intercardinal direction

== Places ==
=== Africa ===
- North East (Nigeria)
- North Eastern Province (Kenya)
- North-East District (Botswana)
- North East Region (Ghana)
- North Eastern District, Eritrea

=== Asia and Oceania ===
- Northeast India or the Seven Sister States
- North East Delhi, a district of Delhi
- North Eastern Province, Sri Lanka
- Northeast China or Manchuria
- North Eastern (General Electors Communal Constituency, Fiji), an electoral division of Fiji
- North-East Region, Singapore
  - North East Community Development Council, Singapore
- Northeast Province (IMCRA region), an Australian marine biogeographic province
- Northeast (Vietnam)
- Tōhoku region or "Northeast Region", Japan

=== United Kingdom ===
- North East (London Assembly constituency), a constituency of the London Assembly
- North East (London sub region), a sub-region of the London Plan
- North East England, one of the official government regions of England
- North East Scotland (Scottish Parliament electoral region), an electoral region, but in wider use to refer to the area made up of Aberdeen, Aberdeenshire and Moray
- North East (Dundee ward), Scotland
- North East (Glasgow ward), Scotland

=== Americas ===
- North East, Maryland
- North East, New York
- North East, Pennsylvania
- Northeast, Minneapolis (sometimes referred to as Nordeast)
- Northeast Region, Brazil, an official grouping of states for economic and statistical purposes
- Atlantic Northeast, a region of North America
- Northeast, Washington, D.C., the northeast quadrant of Washington, D.C.
- Northeastern United States
- Northeast Community, a neighborhood in Tampa, Florida
- Northeast (Billings), a section of Billings, Montana
- Northeast Township, Adams County, Illinois
- Northeast Township, Orange County, Indiana

== People ==
- Sam Northeast (born 1989), English cricketer

== Transportation ==
- Northeast Airlines, a now defunct US airline which began operations in 1931 and merged with Delta Air Lines 1972
- Northeast Airlines (UK), a now defunct British airline which began operations in 1951 as BKS and was merged into British Airways in 1976
- Northeast Airlines (China), a planned start-up airline to be based in Shenyang, People's Republic of China
- Northeast Express Regional Airlines, a now defunct Maine-based regional airline which operated as an affiliate of Northwest Airlines
- Northeastern Limited, named passenger train of the Illinois Central, from Shreveport, Louisiana to Meridian, Mississippi
- North Eastern Railway (disambiguation), various railway companies
- North Eastern Region of British Railways, operating division of British Railways 1948–1967

== Sports ==
- NorthEast United FC, football team based in Guwahati, Assam, India which competes in Indian Super League
- Northeastern Warriors, badminton team based in Guwahati, Assam, India which competes in Premier Badminton League
- North East Re-Organising Cultural Association FC, football club based in Imphal, Manipur, India which competes in I-League
- North East Tigers, boxing team which competes in Super Boxing League (India)
- Northeastern Huskies, are athletic teams representing Northeastern University in Boston, Massachusetts, United States

== Other uses ==
- Northeast (film), a 2005 Argentine film
- North East (film), a 2016 Nigerian romantic drama film
- North East Island (disambiguation)
- Northeastern University, a university in Boston, Massachusetts, USA
- Northeastern University (disambiguation)
- Northeastern Conference, a high school athletic conference in Massachusetts

== See also ==
- Nord-Est (disambiguation), French for northeast
- Nor'easter, a storm
- Nord-Ost, a Russian musical theatre production
