= Longwood Medical Area station =

Light rail station n Boston, Massachusetts, US

Longwood Medical Area
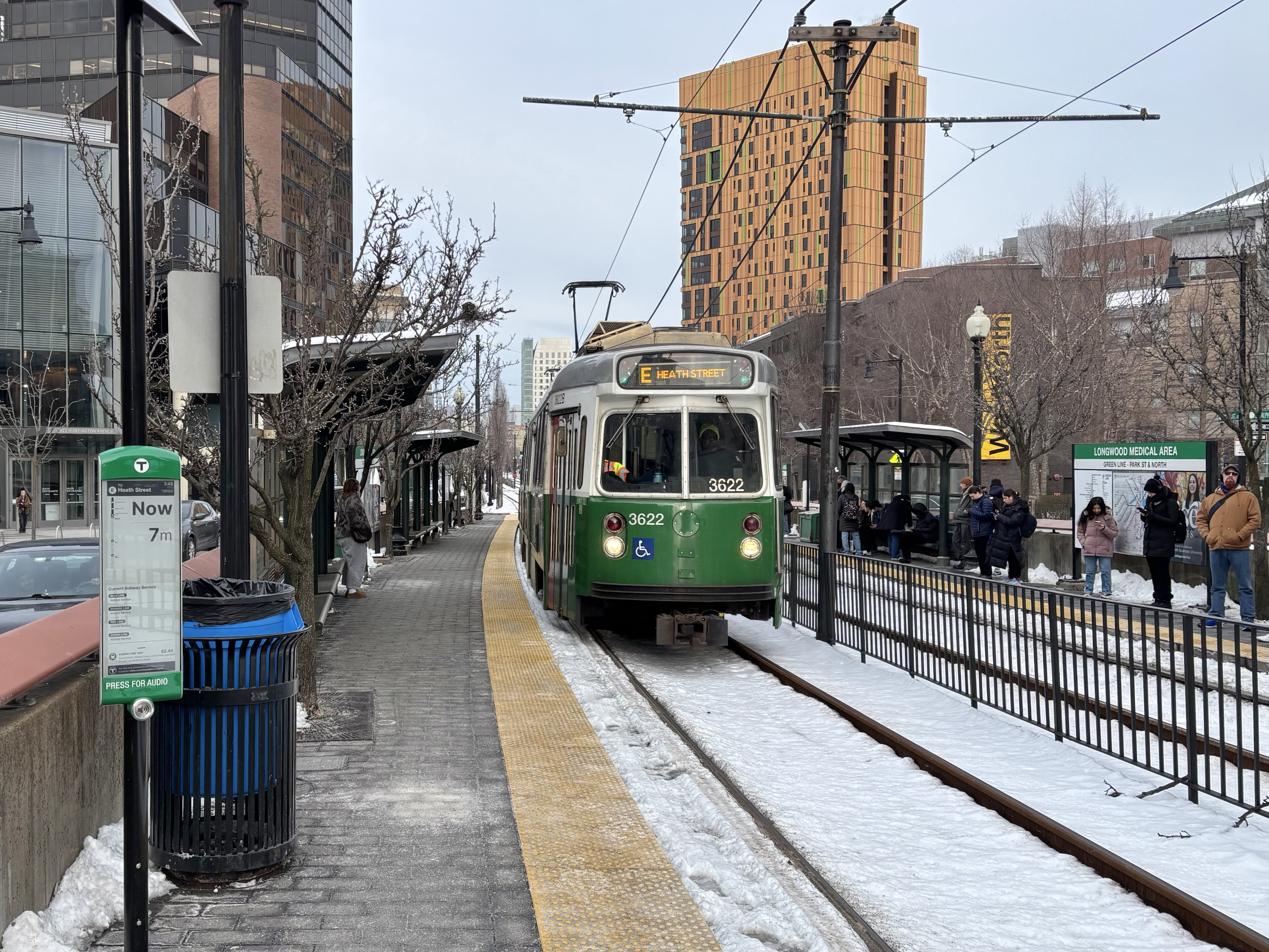
- An outbound train entering the station in February 2025

General information
- Location: Huntington Avenue at Longwood Avenue; Boston, Massachusetts
- Coordinates: 42.33618°N 71.09954°W
- Platforms: 2 side platforms
- Tracks: 2
- Connections: MBTA bus: 39, 85; Mission Hill Link

Construction
- Accessible: Yes

History
- Rebuilt: 2001–January 13, 2003

Passengers
- 2011: 3,813 daily boardings

Services
Preceding station	MBTA	Following station
Brigham Circle toward Heath Street	Green Line E branch	Museum of Fine Arts toward Medford/Tufts
Location

Longwood Medical Area station is a light rail stop on the MBTA Green Line E branch, located in the Mission Hill neighborhood of Boston, Massachusetts. It is named for the adjacent Longwood Medical Area and is the busiest surface stop on the Green Line surface branches, averaging 3,813 daily boardings by a 2011 count.

== History ==
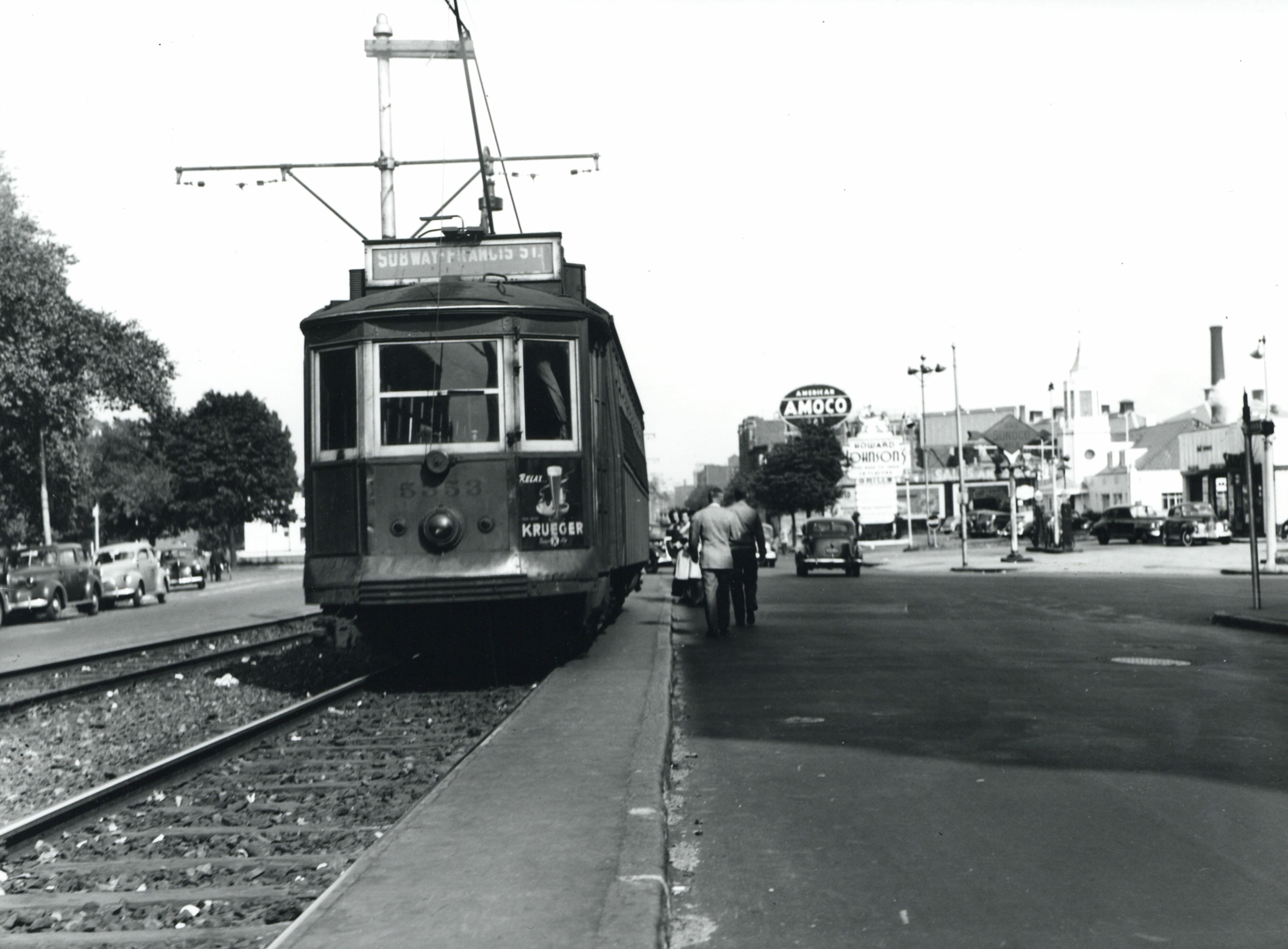
A streetcar at the stop in 1942

Until the completion of the Huntington Avenue subway from Copley to a portal near Opera Place on February 16, 1941, streetcars ran on the surface from the Boylston Street portal. Like other surface stops on the median-reservation section of the line, Longwood Avenue station had bare asphalt platforms. In 1972, the MBTA began planning a reconstruction of that section of the line, then scheduled for 1973-74. The work was eventually done in 1980, when the line was closed to modify the track and wires for the new LRVs. The line was cut back to Symphony on March 21, 1980; it was re-extended to Northeastern (using LRVs) on June 21 and Brigham Circle on September 20.

The station was renamed from Longwood–Hospitals to Longwood Medical Area in the 1980s. Longwood Medical Area's 3,813 daily boardings make it the busiest surface stop on the Green Line. In the early 2000s, the MBTA modified key surface stops with raised platforms for accessibility as part of the Light Rail Accessibility Program. The renovation of Longwood Medical Area - part of a $32 million modification of thirteen B, C, and E branch stations - was completed on January 13, 2003.
