= Symphony station =

Symphony station may refer to:

- Symphony station (MBTA) in Boston, Massachusetts
- Symphony station (Sound Transit) in Seattle, Washington
