= Green Line E branch =

Light rail line in Massachusetts, US

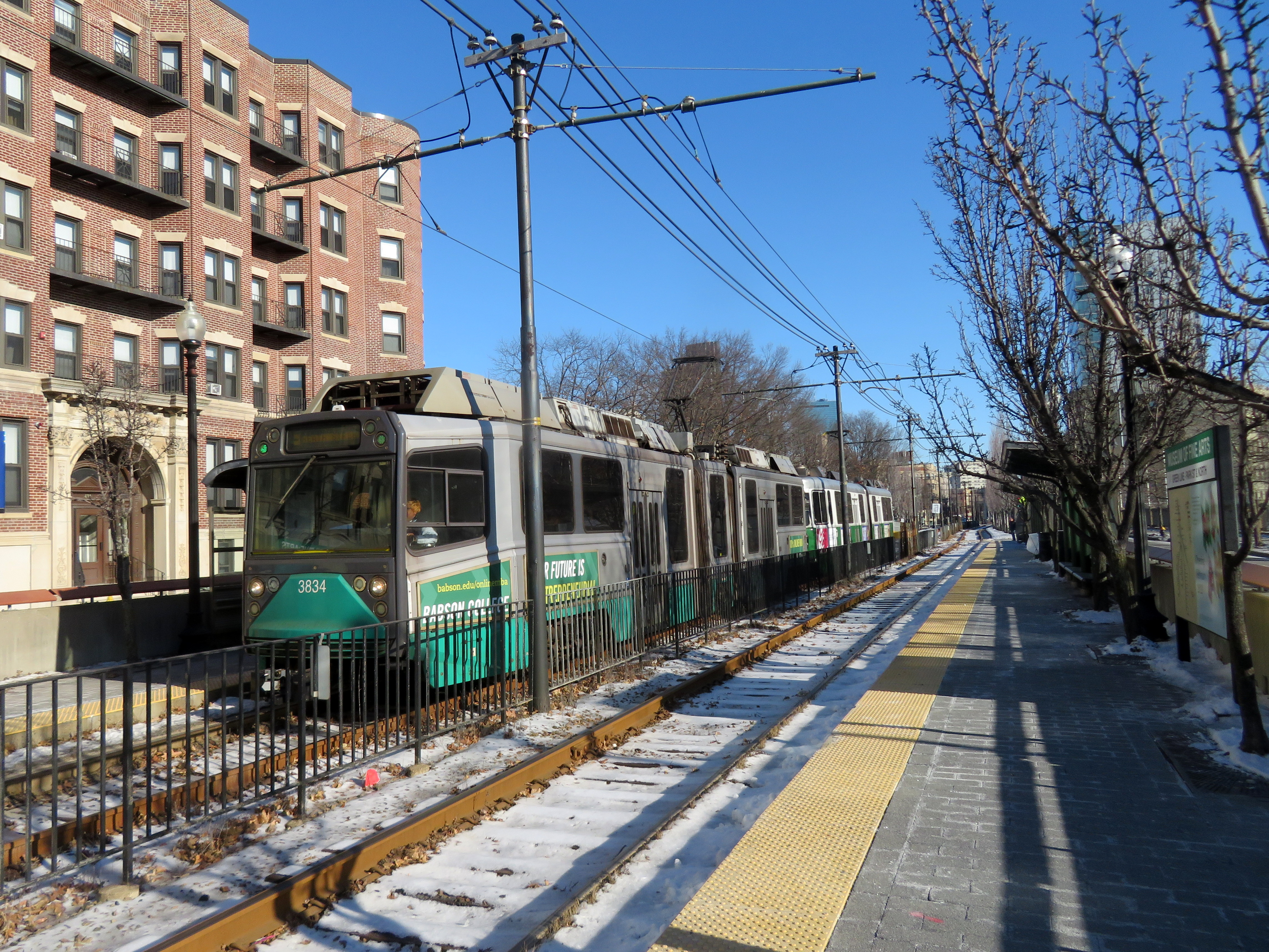
- An outbound train at Museum of Fine Arts station in 2019

Overview
- Locale: Greater Boston
- Termini: Medford/Tufts; Heath Street
- Stations: 25

Service
- Type: Light rail
- System: Green Line (MBTA subway)
- Operator: Massachusetts Bay Transportation Authority

Technical
- Line length: 8.6 miles (13.8 km)
- Num of tracks: 2
- Track gauge: 4 ft 8 1/2 in (1,435 mm) standard gauge
- Electrification: Overhead line, 600 V DC

The E branch (also referred to as the Huntington Avenue branch, or formerly as the Arborway Line) is a light rail line in Boston, Cambridge, Medford, and Somerville, Massachusetts, operating as part of the Massachusetts Bay Transportation Authority (MBTA) Green Line. The line runs in mixed traffic on South Huntington Avenue and Huntington Avenue between Heath Street and Brigham Circle (the last MBTA street-running tracks in revenue service), in the median of Huntington Avenue to Northeastern University, then into the Huntington Avenue subway. The line merges into the Boylston Street subway just west of Copley, running to North Station via the Tremont Street subway. It then follows the Lechmere Viaduct to Lechmere, then the Medford Branch to Medford/Tufts. As of February 2023, service operates on eight-minute headways at weekday peak hours and eight to nine-minute headways at other times, using 13 to 17 trains (26 to 34 light rail vehicles).

Horsecar service on Centre and South streets in Jamaica Plain began in 1857, followed by service on Tremont Street (part of which became the west part of Huntington Avenue) to Brookline Village in 1859 and on the east part of Huntington Avenue in 1881–84. Jamaica Plain service was electrified in 1891, and Huntington Avenue service in 1894. Several branches of the Huntington Avenue line were opened west of Brookline Village between 1894 and 1900; both Huntington Avenue and Jamaica Plain service began using the new Tremont Street subway in 1897. A connector on South Huntington Avenue opened in 1903, allowing service to Jamaica Plain via Huntington Avenue. In the 1920s, Jamaica Plain service was extended to Arborway, while the western branches were reconfigured; they were cut in the 1930s.

The Huntington Avenue subway opened in 1941, cutting travel times through congested Copley Square. Ownership passed from the Boston Elevated Railway to the Metropolitan Transit Authority in 1947, and to the MBTA in 1964. Tremont Street subway service was designated as the Green Line in 1965, with the Huntington Avenue line becoming the E branch in 1967. Service was modified numerous times during the early MBTA era, including a major reconstruction of the line in 1980–82. In 1985, service past Brigham Circle was replaced with the route 39 bus – a "temporary" change that controversially became permanent, although service as far as Heath Street was restored in 1989 after replacement of the street trackage on Huntington Ave. The downtown terminal of the E branch underwent a number of changes during the MBTA era; from 1987 to 2020, it was usually Lechmere. In May 2020, the E branch was cut back to North Station for construction of the Green Line Extension, as part of which it was temporarily extended to Union Square in March 2022. It was permanently extended to Medford/Tufts in December 2022.

== History ==
=== Horsecar lines ===
What became the E branch was formed from portions of several streetcar lines. The first of these was the West Roxbury Railroad, a horsecar line opened on November 14, 1857, in what was then West Roxbury. It ran from Roxbury Crossing to Jamaica Plain along Lowell Street (now Columbus Avenue), Centre Street, and South Street. The line was quickly leased by the Metropolitan Railroad, which operated through service between Jamaica Plain and downtown Boston using its line on Tremont Street. Travel time for the 4 1/2-mile (7.2 km)-long line was over an hour with a ten-cent fare. A two-track carhouse with a waiting room was located at the terminus of the line at Jamaica Street in Jamaica Plain. (The Metropolitan's main carhouse and barn was located at Roxbury Crossing.) In 1858, the Metropolitan opened a connector between Lowell Street and John Eliot Square, allowing Jamaica Plain cars to also use the Washington Street line (via Dudley Square) to reach downtown. The railroad also rebuilt the Jamaica Plain line that year to accommodate heavier ridership, including the double-tracking of some portions.

On August 1, 1859, the Metropolitan was granted permission to add a 1.6-mile (2.6 km)-long branch to School Street (northwest of Brookline Village) along what was then called Washington Street. (It was soon renamed as Tremont Street east of Brookline Village; the portion between Brigham Circle and Brookline Village was renamed again as part of Huntington Avenue in 1895.) The line opened on October 26, 1859. Permission to double-track the line was given on September 9, 1879. The portion west of Brookline Village may have been intermittently operated.

As the west part of the Back Bay was filled, Huntington Avenue became a major thoroughfare. The Metropolitan received rights to construct a double-track line on Huntington from Copley Square (where it connected to the existing Marlborough Street line) to West Chester Park (later renamed Massachusetts Avenue) on March 18, 1881. The 0.7-mile (1.1 km) line opened by that September, serving the exhibitions at the Mechanics Hall and New England Fair Building. A 1.2-mile (1.9 km) extension along the newly-laid-out section of Huntington from West Chester Park to Brigham Circle was granted on October 29, 1883; its opening on October 1, 1884, completed a second Brookline–Boston route. A 1.2-mile (1.9 km) branch along Longwood Avenue to Coolidge Corner opened around late 1884. Around 1888, a 0.8-mile (1.3 km) branch was opened west from Brookline Village on Boylston Street and Cypress Street, serving the Pill Hill area. (This may have been to compete with the Boston and Albany Railroad, which had begun its Newton Circuit service through Brookline in 1886.)

=== Electrification ===
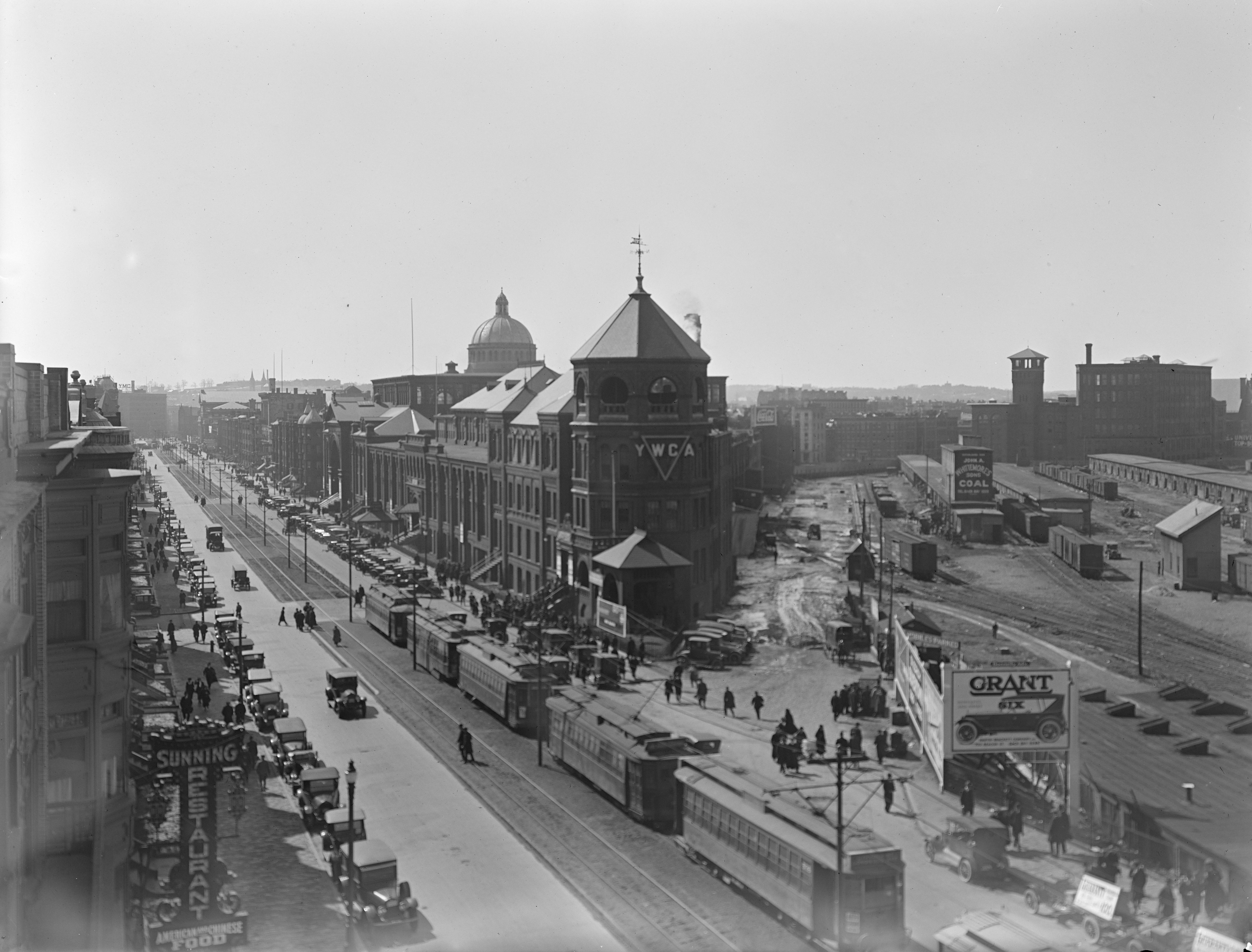
Streetcars on Huntington Avenue at Mechanics Hall (the modern location of Prudential station) in 1920

In November 1887, the Metropolitan was merged into the West End Street Railway as it consolidated the various Boston street railways into a unified system. After the successful electrification of the Beacon Street line in 1888–89, the West End quickly moved to electrify its entire system. The Jamaica Plain–Northern Depots line was concerted to electric operation on October 14, 1891, followed by other Tremont Street lines on October 22. The horsecar barn at Jamaica Plain was replaced with a new structure for the electric cars; in early 1901, it was in turn replaced by a 320-by-325-foot (98 m × 99 m) carhouse with a passenger waiting room and space for 150 streetcars.

The West End electrified its Huntington Avenue line in 1893–94. Work was completed by mid-July 1894 except for a short stretch near the Riverway. On August 4, all Brookline service via Huntington Avenue was converted to electric operation. This included the Washington Street branch (extended to Park Street), the Cypress Street branch, and the Tremont Street tracks to Roxbury Crossing. The Washington Street branch was extended to Beacon Street at Washington Square on September 1, allowing through service between Reservoir via Brookline Village. On August 15, 1896, an extension of the Beacon Street line opened on Chestnut Hill Avenue and Commonwealth Avenue to Lake Street. Reservoir service via Brookline Village was extended to Lake Street, where a connection was made with the Commonwealth Avenue Street Railway.

In November 1894, the Cypress Street branch was extended slightly to the new Cypress Street carhouse, which housed 36 streetcars. The carhouse was expanded in 1897, with a new capacity around 79 cars. Electrification of the Longwood Avenue branch was after the other Huntington Avenue branches, completed in 1894 or 1895. Only the Boston portion of the branch was electrified (possibly owing to the deteriorated bridge over the Muddy River and the Highland branch, which was replaced in 1897–98); in September 1894, Brookline directed the West End to remove the Longwood Avenue tracks west of the town line. In 1894–96, the city paved Huntington Avenue as a boulevard, with the streetcar tracks moved into a dedicated median east of Brigham Circle.

The first section of the Tremont Street subway opened on September 1, 1897. Among the lines immediately routed into the subway using the Public Garden incline were the Cypress Street via Huntington Avenue and Jamaica Plain crosstown via Huntington Avenue lines. The southern subway section to the Pleasant Street incline opened on September 30, and Jamaica Plain cars via Tremont Street were routed into the subway. Reservoir service via Huntington Avenue was added to the subway on November 8. Longwood Avenue cars and Lake Street via Huntington Avenue cars soon used the subway as well. Other early services also used Huntington Avenue east of Massachusetts Avenue, including a Forest Hills–Park Street route via Washington Street (introduced on November 1, 1898) and a Humboldt Avenue–East Boston Ferries route.

=== Expansion ===
Two connecting routes opened in August 1900. New tracks on Harvard Street from Brookline Village to Coolidge Corner allowed through service from Allston to the subway via Huntington Avenue. The Ipswich Street line provided an additional route between Brookline Village and the subway; service on that line initially ran to Cypress Street. Service using the Ipswich Street line was extended west on Boylston Street from Cypress Street to Chestnut Hill Avenue on September 29, 1900, and to the Newton line at Chestnut Hill on November 19. Through service on the Longwood Avenue branch ended on August 8, 1901; it became a Brookline Avenue–Huntington Avenue shuttle. On May 5, 1903, the Boston and Worcester Street Railway (B&W) began operations. It initially terminated at Chestnut Hill, but was extended over BERy tracks on Boylston Street and Huntington Avenue to Park Square on July 6.

The Main Line Elevated opened between Dudley Square and Sullivan Square on June 10, 1901. The Main Line used the outer tracks of the Tremont Street subway (the Pleasant Street incline tracks) and provided a significantly faster route to downtown that surface streetcars, prompting a rearrangement of the streetcar network. Jamaica Plain service was rerouted to the Dudley Square transfer station; a new Dudley–Brookline route was introduced soon after. Tracks on South Street between Jamaica Plain and Forest Hills Square (and the adjacent Forest Hills Yard) were approved by the city in June 1900. Construction did not begin until April 1902, and the connector opened on May 17. The Boston Elevated Railway opened tracks on the newly-laid-out South Huntington Avenue between Centre Street and Huntington Avenue on May 11, 1903, and began running Jamaica Plain–Park Street service via South, Centre, South Huntington, and Huntington.

By March 1907, regular service on Huntington Avenue west of Massachusetts Avenue included cars from Jamaica Plain via South Huntington Avenue, Lake Street (with some Reservoir short turns) via Washington Street, Oak Square via Harvard Street, and Allston Carhouse via Harvard Street, all entering the subway and looping at Park Street; as well as Cypress Street–Dudley cars and B&W cars. (A number of additional routes continued to use Huntington Avenue east of Massachusetts Avenue.) Additional routes used the tracks on South Street and Center Street in Jamaica Plain, including Forest Hills–Park Street (via Columbus Avenue), Jamaica Plain Carhouse–Dudley, and Jamaica Plain–Sullivan Square. Some Allston–Park Street cars were rerouted over Longwood Avenue on October 12, 1907, replacing the shuttle. On November 30, 1908, Main Line trains were rerouted into the Washington Street Tunnel; the outer Tremont Street subway tracks and the Pleasant Street Incline reopened to streetcars on December 4, with some lines extended or rerouted from Dudley. Streetcars entering the subway on Boylston Street continued to loop at Park Street; those entering at Pleasant Street (including lines from Brookline via Tremont Street, and Jamaica Plain via Roxbury Crossing) exited the subway at Canal Street and looped at North Station.

The Washington Street Elevated was extended to Forest Hills on November 22, 1909, increasing its prominence as a transfer location. Requests from local residents and politicians to extend the South Huntington Avenue line from Jamaica Plain Carhouse to Forest Hills began before the extension was completed and continued throughout the 1910s. Free transfers at Jamaica Plain Carhouse were added on March 1, 1913. That April, the BERy indicated willingness to add express service to the South Huntington Avenue line, but could not extend the line until more cars were available. On June 12, 1915, the Hyde Park–Forest Hills line was extended to Jamaica Plain Carhouse, with the Forest Hills–North Station (via Columbus Avenue) route cut back to Jamaica Plain Carhouse; this change was to provide more frequent service between Forest Hills and the carhouse. The change was unpopular with residents; on October 2, 1915, the Hyde Park line was cut back to Forest Hills and the Charles River line extended in its stead, establishing a direct connection between West Roxbury and the South Huntington Avenue line. On March 1, 1924, the BERy opened a streetcar transfer station inside Arborway Yard to relieve crowding at Forest Hills station. The South Huntington Avenue line was soon extended to Arborway, improving connections with the other lines.

=== Reroutes and buses ===
Beginning on January 25, 1913, both Allston–Brookline Village–Park Street lines were extended to North Station, providing through service between the Back Bay and North Station. On May 24, 1914, the BERy began operating a Allston–Dudley crosstown line via Brookline Village. The Boylston Street subway opened on October 3, 1914, extending the subway west to Kenmore Square. Huntington Avenue and Ipswich Street service began using a portal in the median of Boylston Street, which replaced the Public Garden Incline. The outer terminal of Washington Street service was cut to Washington Square except at rush hours as part of the October 3 changes, and the peak-hour terminal was cut to Reservoir on November 21. Oak Square–Park Street service via Huntington Avenue was cut back to Allston–Park Street on January 30, 1915, and a Cypress Street–Park Street line via Longwood Avenue was added. Washington Street service was re-extended to Lake Street on November 6, 1915, as Beacon Street service was cut to Reservoir.

By 1921, four subway services operated on Huntington Avenue: Lake Street, Jamaica Plain, Longwood, and Opera Place short turns. That November, the BERy proposed to operate the line as a quasi-rapid transit service. Brookline Village–Park Street service would operate with two-car trains of large center-entrance streetcars (three-car trains at peak hours); single-car shuttles would operate Jamaica Plain–Huntington and South Huntington and Lake Street–Brookline Village service. Jamaica Plain residents were strongly opposed to the forced transfer, causing the Elevated to revise its plans. Beginning on February 6, 1922, two-car trains were operated between Brookline Village (Cypress Street) and Park Street; Washington Street service was operated as a Brookline Village–Lake Street shuttle. Jamaica Plain service was not changed. Francis Street–Park Street short turns ran from October 20, 1926, to June 27, 1932, and were resumed on June 25, 1934.

On June 13, 1925, Ipswich Street service was cut to Massachusetts–Chestnut Hill, which ended direct service between Chestnut Hill and downtown Boston. In March 1926, the Huntington Avenue and Ipswich Street lines swapped outer terminals, with Huntington Avenue trains running to Chestnut Hill to restore direct service. In December 1928, the BERy began running South Huntington Avenue cars express over Huntington Avenue during the evening peak. The Longwood Avenue shuttle was converted to bus on June 22, 1925. Rarely shown on maps, it was discontinued in 1942 (after an abortive 1934 plan to run the Cypress Street–Kenmore bus over Longwood Avenue); not until the introduction of route 47 in 1972 was Longwood Avenue again used for transit. The Washington Street shuttle was converted to bus on April 24, 1926. It was redirected to Brighton Center on June 23, 1928, and eventually became route 65. The rails were removed for scrap during World War II.

In the 1930s, the Worcester Turnpike was paved as Massachusetts Route 9, an intercity highway, which forced the removal of streetcars. Buses replaced Boston and Worcester Street Railway cars on June 11, 1932. That November, paving reached Chestnut Hill; Huntington Avenue cars were cut back to Cypress Street and Ipswich Street cars to Brookline Village, and a Chestnut Hill–Brookline Village bus route was added. The Ipswich Street line was cut to a short shuttle route in mid-1933, with a new Brookline Village–Kenmore bus route. Cypress Street Carhouse closed on December 3, 1933; the Cypress Street route joined the South Huntington Avenue route in operating from Arborway Yard.

On June 10, 1934, Cypress Street service was cut back to Brookline Village, and buses began operating between Cypress Street and Kenmore. The two bus routes were modified numerous times; they were combined in 1985 and are now MBTA bus route 60. The Allston–Dudley route was replaced by buses on September 10, 1938, with the Brookline Village cars from Huntington Avenue cut back as additional Brigham Circle short turns. The city immediately demolished the Brookline Village transfer station to speed traffic flow through the square.

=== Huntington Avenue subway ===
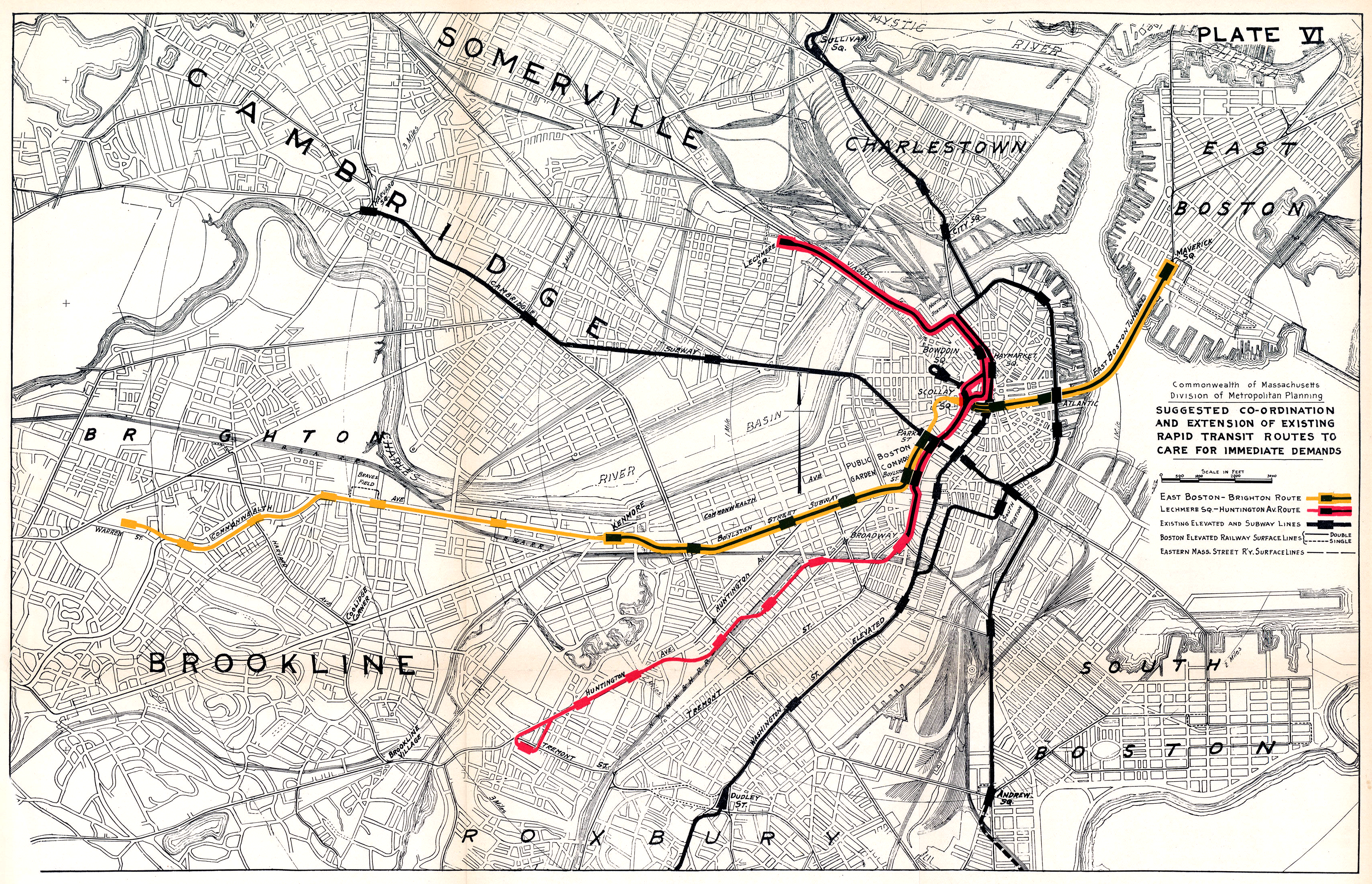
Map of the 1926 proposal

A subway for the Huntington Avenue line was proposed as early as 1906 to remove streetcars from congested Boylston Street and Copley Square. (Streetcars operated in mixed traffic on those segments, with a dedicated median only on Huntington Avenue west of Dartmouth Street.) A subway as far as Mechanics Hall was proposed in 1911, but it was rejected in 1912 on the grounds that the opening of the Cambridge subway and the Boylston Street subway would halve the number of streetcars on Boylston Street.

In May 1924, the state legislature directed the Metropolitan District Commission to plan an expanded rapid transit system in Boston, including an extension of the Boylston street Subway under Governors Square. The report, released in December 1926, called for the existing streetcar tunnels in Boston to be reorganized into two rapid transit lines with high-floor rolling stock. One line was to run from Lechmere through the existing Tremont Street subway, parallel the New Haven Railroad tracks towards Providence using tunnels and an embankment as far as Massachusetts Avenue, then run along the surface on Huntington Avenue to Francis Street (Brigham Circle). The extension would have new stations at Pleasant Street, Back Bay station, West Newton Street, and Massachusetts Avenue, plus consolidated surface stops at the Museum of Fine Arts and the Longwood Medical Area. Streetcar lines on Tremont Street and Huntington Avenue would connect with rapid transit trains at a surface-level transfer station at Brigham Circle. Future extension of the tunnel to Brookline Village was considered.

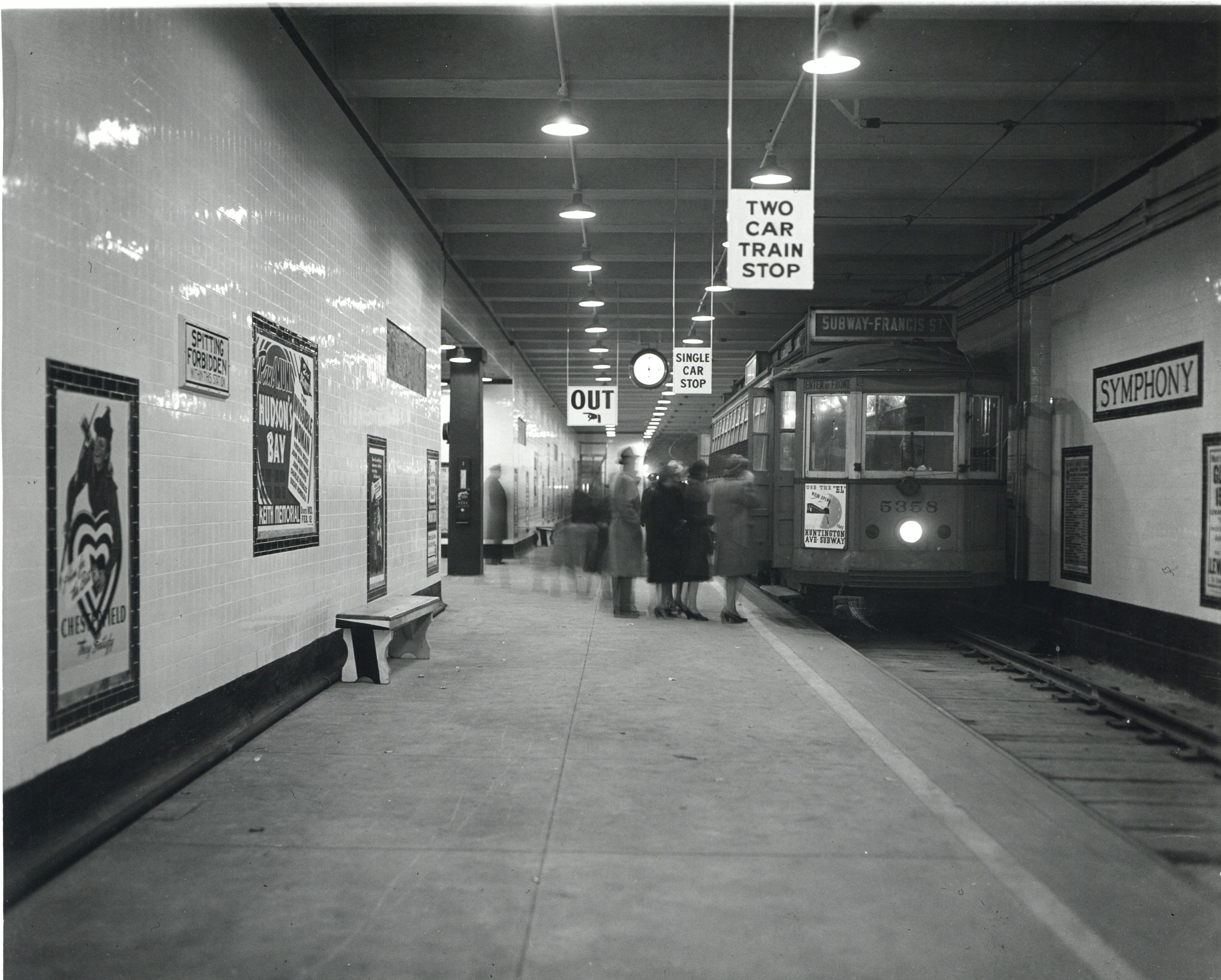
Symphony station shortly after its 1941 opening. The streetcar is a route 57 car bound for the Francis Street (Brigham Circle) cutback.

After the Berkeley Street line was closed around 1930, only Huntington Avenue cars used the Boylston Street Incline. In June 1932, the state legislature authorized the construction of a tunnel from Gainsborough Street under Huntington Avenue, Stuart Street, Columbus Avenue, and the Boston Common to Park Street station. The BERy did not approve the project because the portion east of Copley Square would have duplicated the existing subways at considerable cost, and it would not relieve congestion at the intersection with Massachusetts Avenue; the state act did not allow for any modifications to the route.

Mayor James Michael Curley advanced a new plan in 1933, calling for an $8.5 million subway from Copley Square to Longwood Avenue, to be funded by the National Industrial Recovery Act rather than imposing local debt. In July 1933, the state legislature provided conditions for the construction of the subway with more route flexibility. It was approved by the city and the BERy, but not by the state Emergency Finance Board. The Boston Transit Department developed six possible tunnel plans for evaluation. A tunnel as far west as Longwood Avenue or as short as Dartmouth Street was considered, as splitting from the existing subway east of Copley station (with a new station added under Copley Square) or to the west.

In October 1936, construction of the subway to just shy of West Newton Street was approved as a federal Works Progress Administration (WPA) project. Work was expected to last 1 year and cost $1.715 million, with the city's share about $539,000. The Boston City Council and Boston Elevated Railway approved the plans in April 1937. Construction began on September 18, 1937. In 1938, the Boston Transit Department extended the project to Opera Place, with underground stations at Mechanics and Symphony and an auto underpass of Massachusetts Avenue adjacent to Symphony station. Federal approval was granted in early August.

The subway was constructed as twin tubes some 4,316 feet (1,316 m) long; they were adjacent except at Symphony station, where they ran on opposite sides of the underpass. The final cost of the project was $7.13 million (equivalent to $120 million in 2025), of which the city paid $1.93 million and the federal government $5.20 million. It was the second-largest project to be primarily funded by the WPA, exceeded only by LaGuardia Airport.

The Huntington Avenue subway opened on February 16, 1941, taking Huntington Avenue cars (the last to use the Boylston Street Portal) underground for a larger part of their route. By then, three routes used the Huntington Avenue line:

- 39: Arborway–Park Street
- 41: Jamaica Plain–Dudley Square
- 57: Francis Street–Park Street (a short turn of route 39)

A loop at Heath Street was constructed in 1945 to allow use of the new PCC streetcars, which only had an operator's cab at one end and could not use crossovers like the one at Francis Street to reverse direction. Route 57 was extended to the new loop on December 15, 1945, and began using PCC streetcars on January 3, 1946. From June 1947 to June 1949, and again in the 1950s, an additional Northeastern University–Park Street shuttle was run.

Route 41 was replaced by buses on June 8, 1949. In 1954, route 57 was extended to the surface terminal at North Station. Route 57 - by then a weekday-only route - was discontinued effective September 1, 1961. The number was reassigned to the short-lived Boylston–Pleasant Street shuttle in November 1961. From September 1962 to March 1965, a single Lechmere–Heath Street round trip was operating during the morning peak to serve school demand. This trip was the only time that three-car trains of PCC cars were used on Huntington Avenue.

=== MBTA era ===
The Massachusetts Bay Transportation Authority (MBTA) took over from the MTA in 1964. The MBTA gave color designations to the four subway lines in 1965, with the Tremont Street subway routes designated as the Green Line. On December 26, 1964, Heath Street–Government Center short turns using the newly opened loop at Government Center were added to accommodate ridership from the new Prudential Center. These trips were cut back to Park Street the next month, but returned to Government Center on March 25, 1967. On September 19, 1966, the Heath Street short turn was increased in frequency, with every other trip terminating at Heath Street during peak hours. This experiment was unsuccessful and was ended on November 7. The Heath Street short turns were reduced from two-car trains to single cars on January 3, 1972.

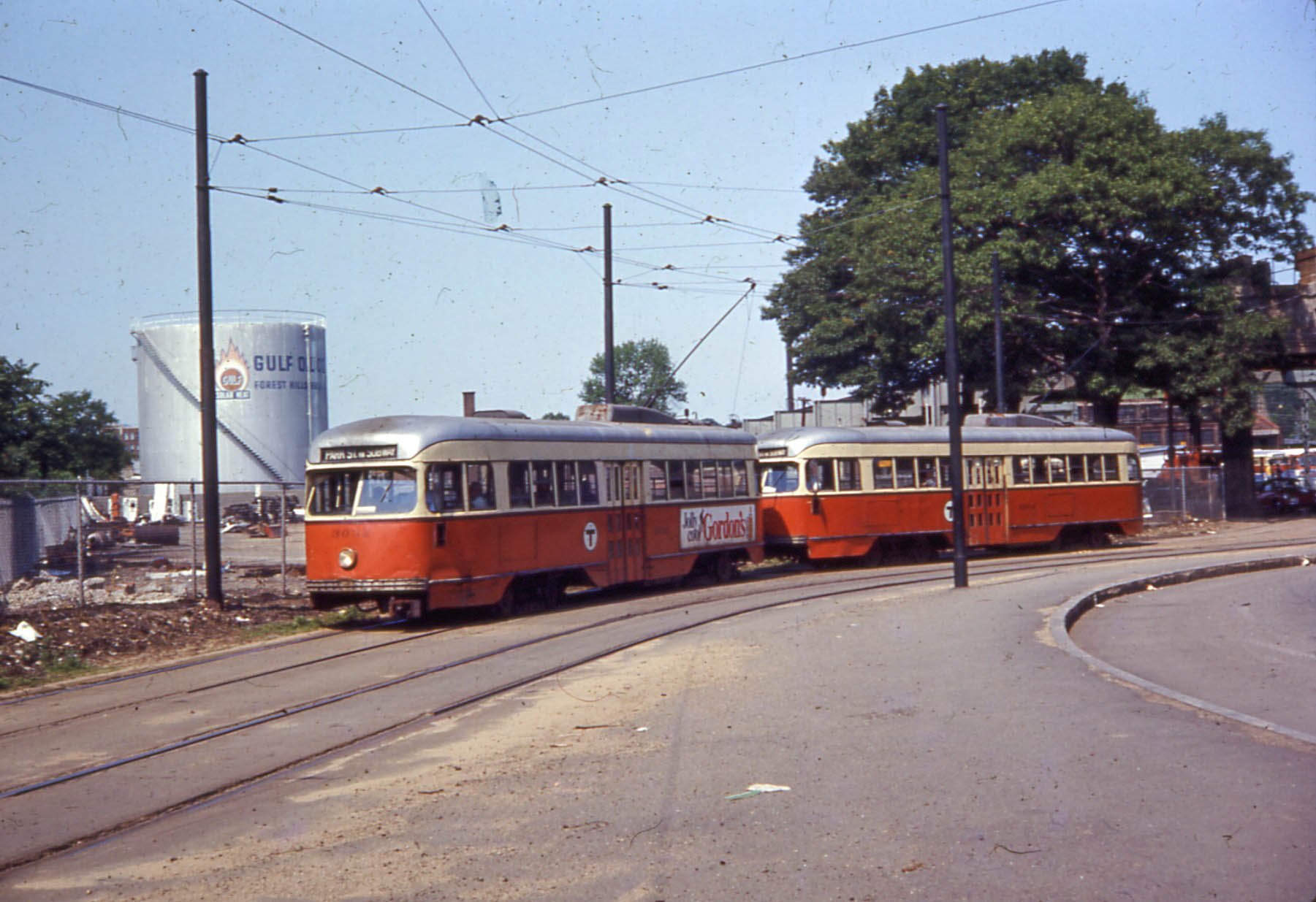
A two-car train at Arborway in 1967

The five Green Line branches were lettered in 1967, with the Huntington Avenue line designated the E branch. In 1968, the city and the MBTA began planning a widening of Huntington Avenue east of Brigham Circle. Three of the eight stops (Forsyth Street, Vancouver Street, and Wigglesworth Street) would be closed, with platforms widened (the original impetus for the project) at the remaining five. The long siding would be moved inside the reservation, and fencing would be placed between the tracks to deter pedestrians from crossing the tracks away from intersections. The project was stalled in 1969 by federal budget cuts. In 1971, the MBTA replaced both tracks between Brigham Circle and Parker Hill Street. The widening project was revived in 1972, with the addition of a footbridge at Northeastern. The project faced opposition from the Museum of Fine Arts, which objected to the taking of a 10-foot (3.0 m)-wide strip of the museum's lawn. It was placed on hold in 1975 due to the ongoing recession.

From September 11, 1976, to January 1, 1977, service was replaced with buses at night to allow installation of new lighting and electrical equipment in the Huntington Avenue subway. On January 1, all peak and midday service was cut to Heath Street as winter weather caused a car shortage; buses designated route 39 ran between Arborway and Copley. This ended on March 19; regular Heath Street turns were extended to North Station from then to June 18, 1977. Route 39 buses again replaced weekday service past Heath Street from June 18 to September 9 due to track work on Centre Street. Continued streetcar shortages and delays with the new Boeing LRVs caused weekday service to be replaced with buses past Heath Street on October 17, 1977. Service to Arborway resumed in stages, with full service restored on December 31, 1978. The new LRVs were first used on the line for Northeastern short turns on January 16, 1978; these were extended to Heath Street on April 24.

Although the planned road widening never occurred, the MBTA ultimately reconstructed the line for use by the new LRVs as part of other road and sewer work on Huntington Avenue. The MBTA work largely followed the plans proposed in the 1960s; the Northeastern footbridge was not included. The three previously proposed stops were cut along with Parker Street; the remaining stops at Brigham Circle, Longwood Medical Area, Museum-Ruggles, and Northeastern were rebuilt with wider and longer platforms. On March 21, 1980, service was cut back to a Symphony–Park Street shuttle (run by LRVs) to allow for construction, with route 39 buses again operating. The shuttle was extended to Northeastern on June 21 and Brigham Circle on September 20. Symphony was closed on January 3, 1981, during a budget crisis. Service restoration on the outer section of the line, originally scheduled for 1981, was delayed by the budget issues. Arborway service ultimately resumed on June 26, 1982, including peak-hour Heath Street short turns and the reopening of Symphony.

Heath Street service was extended to Lechmere on January 2, 1983. A snowstorm on February 11 temporarily shut down the Arborway Line; a Lechmere–Government Center shuttle was run to replace the Heath Street cars. The Arborway Line quickly reopened, but the Heath Street turns were not resumed; the shuttle ran until March 26. From October 12 to November 11, 1983, the line was cut back to Brigham Circle (with double-ended LRVs) due to Southwest Corridor construction near Arborway, with route 39 buses running. Heath Street short turns were resumed on September 18, 1984, using LRVs.

=== Arborway restoration controversy ===
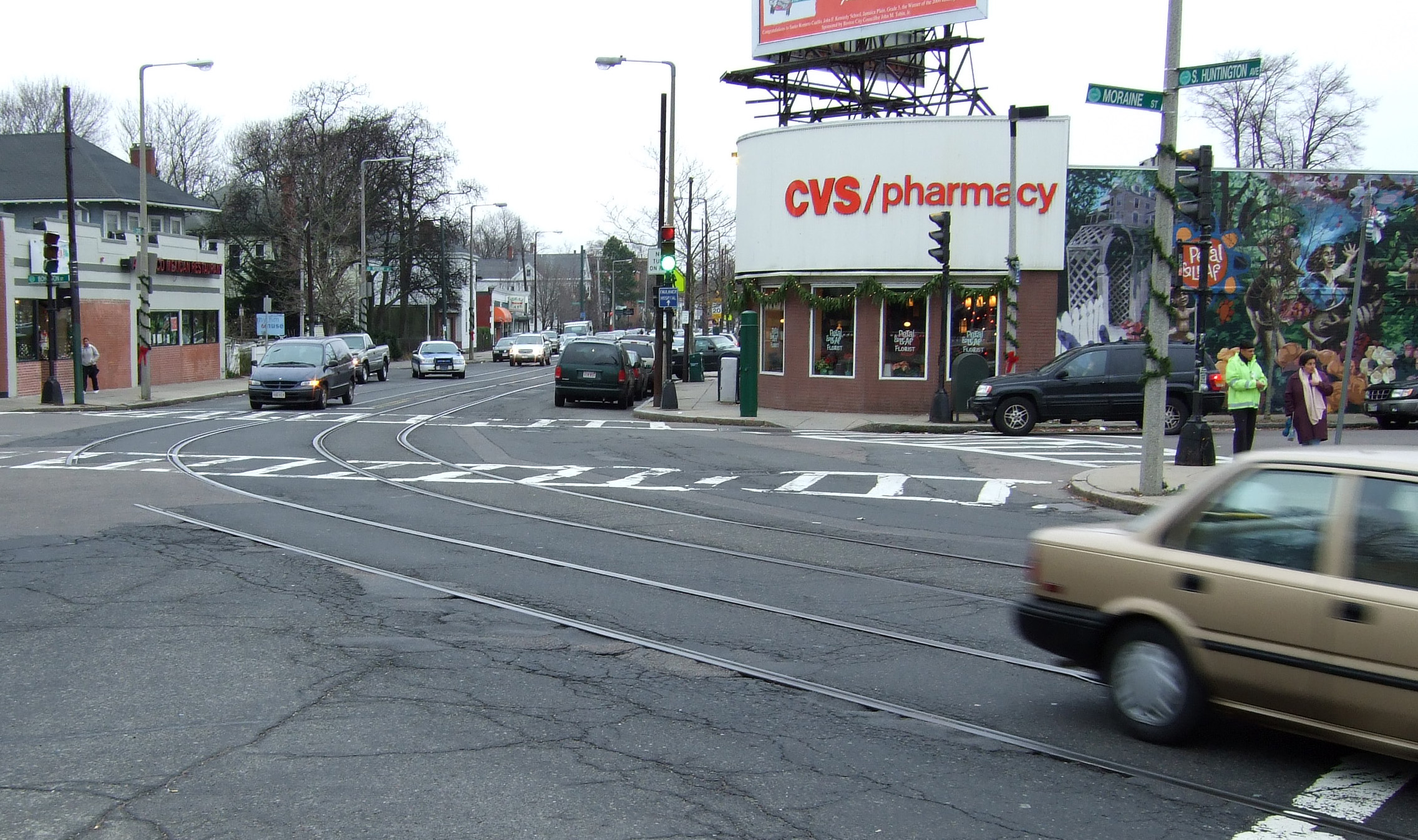
Unused E branch tracks at the intersection of South Huntington Avenue and Moraine Street in 2006

On December 28, 1985, the Arborway Line was indefinitely replaced by route 39 (Arborway–Copley) bus service due to road construction on Huntington Avenue. This ended PCC streetcar service on the Green Line, though they remained in use on the Mattapan Line. LRV service was resumed to Brigham Circle on July 26, 1986; the downtown terminal was Lechmere on weekdays, and Government Center nights and weekends. On June 20, 1987, all Brigham Circle service was extended to Lechmere, with newer Type 7 LRVs replacing the Boeing LRVs. Heath Street service resumed on November 4, 1989, but route 39 buses continued to provide all service south of Heath Street. That December, route 39 was extended to Back Bay station to connect with the Orange Line; fares were reduced from subway to bus prices. By 1990, the Centre Street/South Huntington Avenue corridor was the single busiest MBTA bus corridor, with 19,040 daily riders on route 39. From 2000 to 2017, buses used a loop - originally built for the Green Line, but never used by revenue trains - at Forest Hills.

Whether to restore E branch service to Arborway became controversial; much of Jamaica Plain wanted the line to return, while the MBTA did not wish to resume using the long street-running section. A 1987 study found that restoring service to Arborway would cost $37.4 million in construction and $5.9 million in annual operating costs, but would draw more riders than bus service. To settle a lawsuit with the Conservation Law Foundation, the Massachusetts Executive Office of Transportation and Construction (EOTC) agreed to environmental mitigation for increased automobile emissions due to the Central Artery/Tunnel Project. In 2000, an Administrative Consent Order (ACO) affirmed specific project commitments, including restoration of streetcar service beyond Heath Street to Arborway. Restoration was also included in the State Implementation Plan for the Clean Air Act (SIP) which is required by the Environmental Protection Agency due to non-attainment of National Ambient Air Quality Standards. After some MBTA and community opposition, a revised settlement resulted in the substitution of other projects with similar regional air quality benefits, though no longer localized along the E branch corridor. EOTC promised to consider other transit enhancements in the Arborway corridor.

A 2004 study stated that since tracks to Arborway would be street-running along South and Centre streets, trolley traffic would increase local congestion and could potentially block emergency vehicles. Councilor John Tobin asked the MBTA to remove the tracks in March 2005, which by then had (along with the overhead poles) deteriorated to the point where they were not usable. The Arborway Committee filed suit in 2007, but an appeals court ruled in January 2011 that the lawsuit was a decade too late to be considered – effectively ending any attempt for the restoration of streetcar service for the foreseeable future. About 140 remaining overhead wire support poles were removed by the MBTA in late 2023. The City of Boston has proposed extending the E branch southward to Hyde Square in Jamaica Plain.

Dedicated lanes were added on several streets in Boston during the August–September 2022 closure of the Orange Line. Four sections, all of which are used by route 39 buses, were made permanent: Boylston Street from Ring Road to Clarendon Street, Clarendon from Boylston to Columbus Avenue, St. James Avenue from near Berkeley Street to Dartmouth Street, and Huntington Avenue from Brigham Circle to Gainsborough Street (39 and 66). In September 2023, the MBTA indicated that the Huntington Avenue lanes saved up to two minutes per trip at peak hours. In May 2022, the MBTA released a draft plan for a systemwide network redesign. The draft proposed that route 39 be extended to Porter via Central and Fenway, taking over portions of routes 47, 91, and 87. The portion from Longwood Avenue to Back Bay was to be discontinued. A November 2022 draft network plan reverted route 39 to its existing routing, with a more frequent route 47 instead extended to Union Square. Service changes effective August 24, 2025, extended service one hour longer on Friday and Saturday evenings. Effective December 14, 2025, route 39 is scheduled to operate every 15 minutes or less during normal service hours.

=== Later changes ===
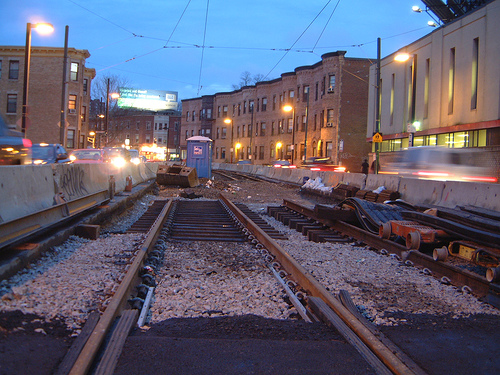
Reconstruction of the E branch along Huntington Avenue in November 2006

On October 20, 1996, the Muddy River flooded the Central Subway. The E branch was replaced by buses; service was restored to Northeastern on October 25, Brigham Circle on November 9, and Heath Street on December 7. In 1999, the MBTA considered abandoning the E Branch west of Brigham Circle due to poor track conditions. After opposition from residents and politicians, the MBTA decided to rebuild the tracks on South Huntington Avenue instead. From July 24 to December 17, 2000, the line was cut back to Brigham Circle during track work, with route 39 supplemented by express service.

In the early 2000s, the MBTA modified key surface stops with raised platforms for accessibility as part of the Light Rail Accessibility Program. Portable lifts were installed at Heath Street and Museum of Fine Arts around 2000 as a temporary measure. For much of mid-2002, buses replaced weekend service to allow for the station construction. The accessible platforms at Northeastern, Museum of Fine Arts, Longwood, Brigham Circle, and Heath Street - part of a $32 million modification of thirteen B, C, and E branch stations - were completed in 2003. Prudential station was made accessible in 2002–03 as part of the construction of 111 Huntington Avenue nearby.

From June 28, 2004, to November 12, 2005, E branch service was cut back to North Station as the Causeway Street elevated was replaced by a new tunnel. Track work again caused the line to be cut to Brigham Circle from September 2 to December 30, 2006. Three-car trains were operated on the line for a brief period beginning on March 21, 2011. Service was cut to North Station from April 30 to November 4, 2011, as Science Park was renovated.

As part of a series of service reductions due to a budget crisis, weekend service was cut to Brigham Circle on July 1, 2012. The cutback was unpopular with local residents, who considered it an unnecessary inconvenience. On October 13, 2012, the cut was quietly reversed by reducing frequency on the branch slightly, thus allowing the same equipment to cover the full line at no additional cost. This was made official with the December 29, 2012 timetable.

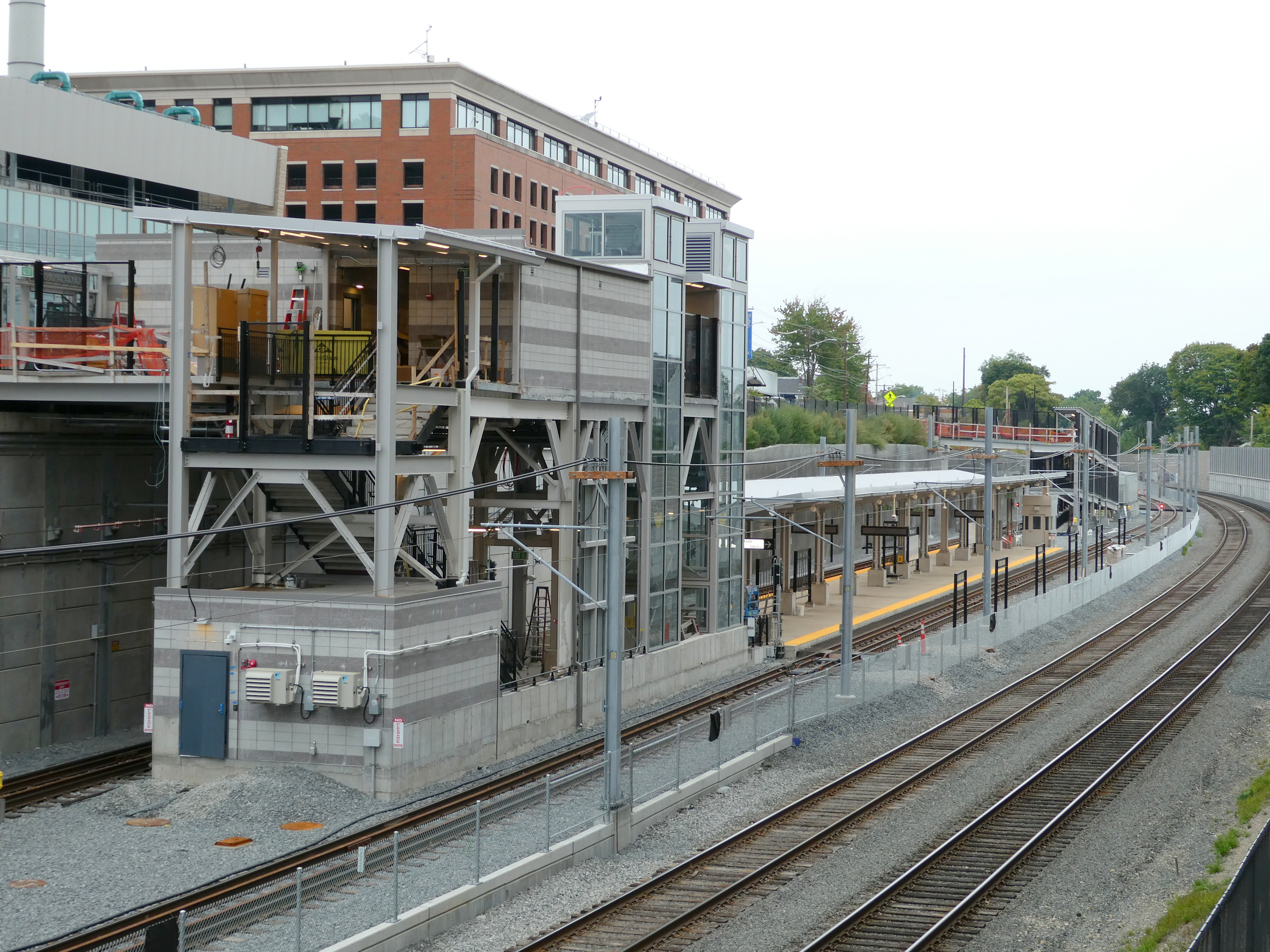
Medford/Tufts station under construction in September 2022

From August 3–29, 2020, Prudential–Heath Street service was replaced by buses to allow for expedited track work. Seven grade crossings and 9,500 feet (2,900 m) of track were replaced during the closure. An additional monthlong closure between Heath Street and Brigham Circle took place August 2–29, 2021. The first phase of construction for accessibility modifications at Symphony station began in 2023, but the main phase was placed on hold in 2024 after bids came in higher than expected.

On May 24, 2020, service was cut back from Lechmere to North Station to allow the old Lechmere Elevated to be demolished and the Lechmere Viaduct connected to the Green Line Extension viaduct. Original plans for the Green Line Extension called for the E branch to run to Union Square. However, in April 2021, the MBTA indicated that the E branch would instead be extended to Medford/Tufts, with the D branch running to Union Square. The D and E branches were chosen for the extension because they serve the Longwood Medical Area; the E branch was assigned to the longer Medford Branch because its western leg is shorter than that of the D branch.

The Union Square Branch opened as part of the E branch on March 21, 2022. From August 6–20, 2022, the E branch was closed between Heath Street and Copley for track replacement and installation of a train protection system; Union Square was served by C and D branch trains. The section between Union Square and Government Center was closed from August 22 to September 18, 2022, to allow for final integration of the Medford Branch, elimination of a speed restriction on the Lechmere Viaduct, and other work. After the closure, both D and E trains served Union Square. On November 1, 2022, Lechmere became the terminal for E branch service, with trains continuing out-of-service to Medford/Tufts as test trains. Medford Branch revenue service began on December 12, 2022.

In 2021, the MBTA indicated plans to modify the Heath Street–Brigham Circle section of the E branch with accessible platforms to replace the existing non-accessible stopping locations. The new platforms are planned to be long enough to accommodate two 110-foot (34 m) Type 10 vehicles. Design work began in July 2023. Platforms will be built at Riverway and Mission Park; Fenwood Road and Back of the Hill will be closed. The Heath Street loop will be replaced with a new station that can accommodate a future extension to the south. As of October 2026, design work is expected to be completed in late 2027, with construction taking place in 2028–2029. The full project was expected to cost $86 million in 2022. In 2026, the MBTA estimated the project would cost $283 million. Symphony station closed effective May 30, 2026, for approximately three years for renovations including accessibility.

== Station listing ==
Location	Station	Opened	Notes and connections
Medford	Medford/Tufts	December 12, 2022	MBTA bus: 80, 94, 96
Medford	Ball Square	December 12, 2022	MBTA bus: 80, 89
Somerville	Magoun Square	December 12, 2022	
Somerville	Gilman Square	December 12, 2022	MBTA bus: 80
Somerville	East Somerville	December 12, 2022	MBTA bus: 85, 91, 109
East Cambridge	Lechmere	March 21, 2022	The Lechmere Viaduct opened on June 1, 1912, with a direct connection to surface lines until July 9, 1922. The surface station was open from July 10, 1922, to May 23, 2020. MBTA bus: 69, 80, 87, 88; EZRide
West End	Science Park	August 20, 1955	
North End	North Station	June 28, 2004	Amtrak: Downeaster; MBTA Commuter Rail: Fitchburg, Lowell, Haverhill, Newburyport/Rockport; MBTA subway: Orange Line; MBTA bus: 4 EZRide; MBTA ferry: F10 (at Lovejoy Wharf); Seaport Ferry (at Lovejoy Wharf); Original surface station was open from September 3, 1898 to March 27, 1997. Elevated station was open from June 1, 1912 to June 24, 2004.
North End	Haymarket	September 3, 1898	MBTA subway: Orange Line; MBTA bus: 4, 92, 93, 111, 354, 426, 428, 450
Downtown Boston	Government Center	September 3, 1898	MBTA subway: Blue Line; MBTA bus: 354
Downtown Boston	Park Street	September 1, 1897	MBTA subway: Red Line, Silver Line (SL5); MBTA bus: 43; At Downtown Crossing: Orange Line; 7, 11, 501, 504, 505
Downtown Boston	Boylston	September 1, 1897	MBTA subway: Silver Line (SL5); MBTA bus: 43
Back Bay	Arlington	November 13, 1921	MBTA bus: 9, 10, 55, 501, 504
Back Bay	Copley	October 3, 1914	MBTA bus: 9, 10, 39, 55, 501, 504
Back Bay	Prudential	February 16, 1941	MBTA bus: 39, 55
Fenway–Kenmore	Symphony	February 16, 1941	Temporarily closed from May 30, 2026, to mid-2029. MBTA bus: 1, 39
Fenway–Kenmore	Northeastern University	August 4, 1894	MBTA bus: 39
Fenway–Kenmore	Forsyth Street	August 4, 1894	Closed March 22, 1980
Fenway–Kenmore	Parker Street	August 4, 1894	Closed March 22, 1980
Fenway–Kenmore	Museum of Fine Arts	August 4, 1894	MBTA bus: 8, 19, 39, 47, 65, 85, CT3
Fenway–Kenmore	Vancouver Street	August 4, 1894	Closed March 22, 1980
Longwood	Longwood Medical Area	August 4, 1894	MBTA bus: 39, 65, 85; Mission Hill Link
Longwood	Wigglesworth Street	August 4, 1894	Closed March 22, 1980
Longwood	Brigham Circle	August 4, 1894	MBTA bus: 39, 66
Mission Hill	Fenwood Road	August 4, 1894	MBTA bus: 39, 66; Mission Hill Link
Mission Hill	Mission Park	August 4, 1894	MBTA bus: 39, 66
Mission Hill	Riverway	August 4, 1894	MBTA bus: 39, 66
Mission Hill	Back of the Hill	June 26, 1982	MBTA bus: 39
Mission Hill	Heath Street	December 15, 1945	MBTA bus: 14, 39
Jamaica Plain	Stops on South Huntington Avenue	July 11, 1903	Closed December 28, 1985
Jamaica Plain	Stops on Centre and South Streets	October 14, 1891	Closed December 28, 1985
Jamaica Plain	Stops on South Street	May 17, 1902	Closed December 28, 1985
Jamaica Plain	Arborway	May 17, 1902	Closed December 28, 1985; Terminal for other streetcar (until 1953) and bus lines. Connection to Orange Line at Forest Hills.
