= Nord-Est =

Nord-Est (French for northeast) may refer to:

- Nord-Est (department), Haiti
- Nord-Est (development region), a region in Romania

See also

- Northeast (disambiguation)
