= Northeastern College (disambiguation) =

Northeastern College may refer to:

- Northeastern College, Santiago, Isabela, Philippines
- North Eastern College, Sangre Grande, Trinidad, Trinidad and Tobago

== See also ==
- Northeastern University (disambiguation)
