= Northeastern Railroad =

Northeastern Railroad may refer to:

- North Eastern Rail Road (Georgia), 1854-1895, predecessor of the Southern Railway
- Northeastern Railroad (South Carolina), 1851-1898, predecessor of the Atlantic Coast Line Railroad

== See also ==
- North Eastern Railway (disambiguation)
