= Northeastern University station =

Light rail station in Boston, Massachusetts, US

Northeastern
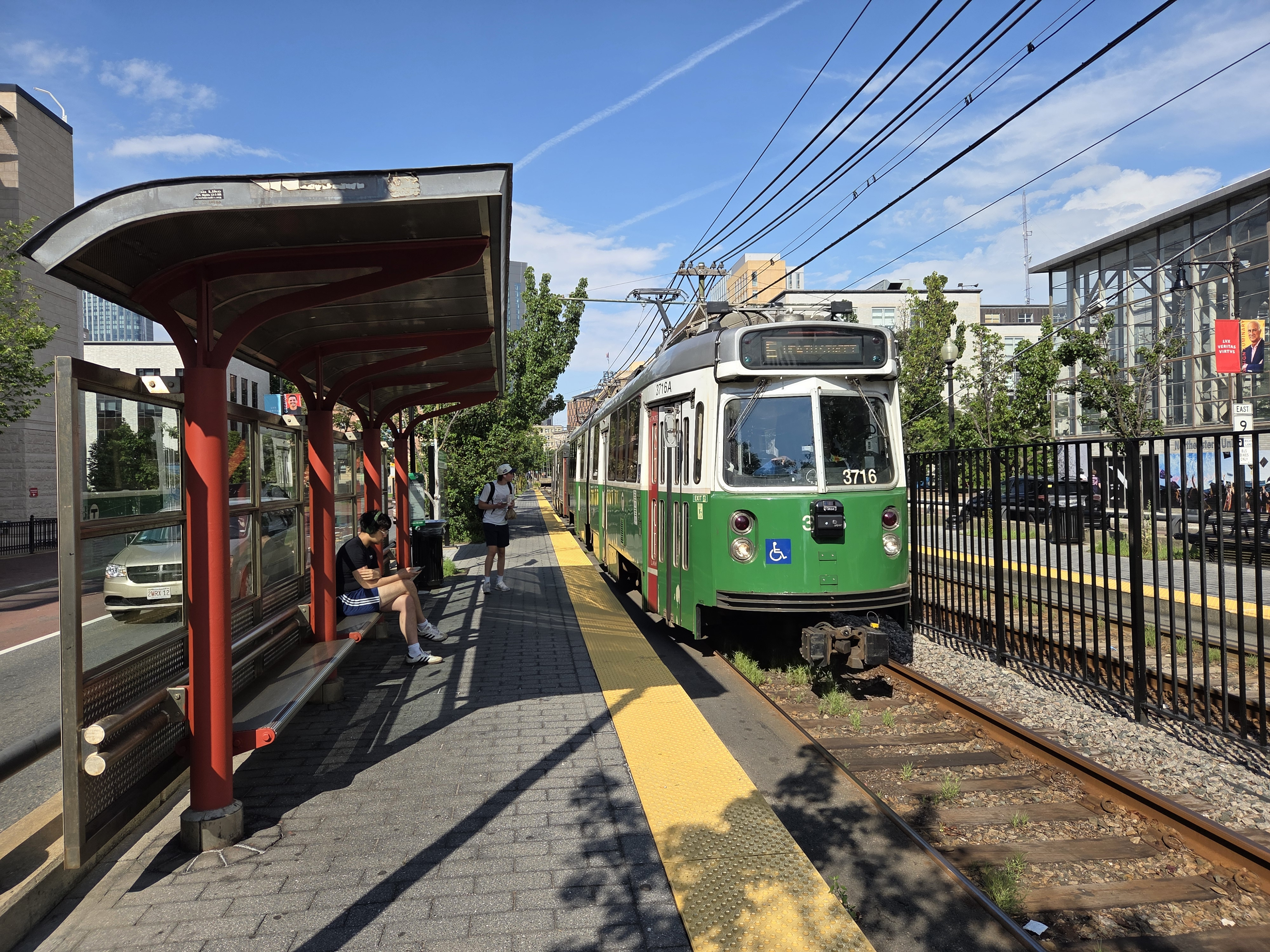
- An outbound train at the station in 2026

General information
- Location: Huntington Avenue at Opera Place; Boston, Massachusetts
- Coordinates: 42.34008°N 71.08967°W
- Platforms: 2 side platforms
- Tracks: 2
- Connections: MBTA bus: 39

Construction
- Accessible: Yes

History
- Rebuilt: 2002–May 26, 2003
- Former names: Opera Place (until 1947)

Passengers
- 2011: 2,650 daily boardings

Services
Preceding station	MBTA	Following station
Museum of Fine Arts toward Heath Street	Green Line E branch	Symphony (temporarily closed) toward Medford/Tufts
Location

Northeastern University station (signed as Northeastern) is a surface-level light rail stop on the MBTA Green Line. It is located in a dedicated median along Huntington Avenue in Boston, between Opera Place and Forsyth Street, and is adjacent to the Krentzman Quad on the campus of Northeastern University. It is the first surface-level stop going outbound along the Green Line E branch; trolleys rise from a portal located between Opera Place and Gainsborough Street and continue along the surface down Huntington Avenue towards Mission Hill.

== History ==
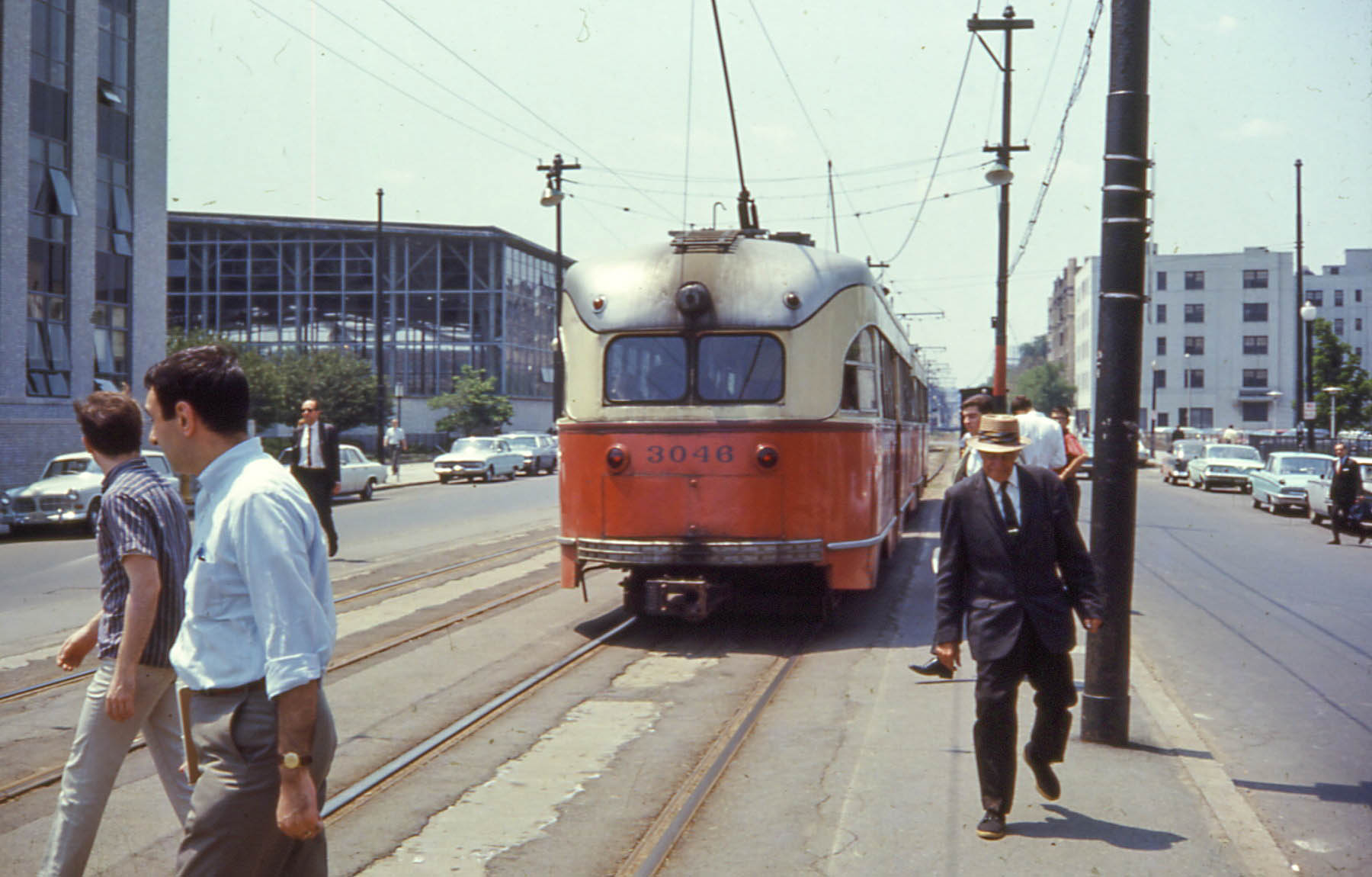
An outbound streetcar at Northeastern in 1967

Until the completion of the Huntington Avenue subway from Copley to a portal near Opera Place on February 16, 1941, streetcars ran on the surface from the Boylston Street portal. With the completion of the tunnel, Opera Place became an important short turn location; a siding was constructed adjacent to the inbound track. On May 21, 1947, the Boston Elevated Railway board voted to change the name from Opera Place to Northeastern University to reflect the growth of the adjacent Northeastern University. The stop was named on maps beginning around 1950, while most other surface stops did not appear separately until around 1990.

Like other surface stops on the median-reservation section of the line, Northeastern University station had bare asphalt platforms. In 1972, the MBTA began planning a reconstruction of that section of the line, then scheduled for 1973–74. The Northeastern siding was to be moved into the reservation, with a footbridge installed near the station for students. The work (minus the footbridge) were eventually done in 1980, when the line was closed to modify the track and wires for the new LRVs. The line was cut back to Symphony on March 21, 1980; it was re-extended to Northeastern (using LRVs) on June 21 and Brigham Circle on September 20. The platforms at Northeastern were lengthened and paved with brick.

In the early 2000s, the MBTA modified key surface stops with raised platforms for accessibility as part of the Light Rail Accessibility Program. The platforms at Northeastern were lengthened to Forsyth Street and repaved with concrete; temporary platforms northeast of Opera Place were used during the renovations. That renovation — part of a $32 million modification of thirteen B, C, and E branch stations — was completed on May 26, 2003. On August 23, 2004, a Type 8 Breda low-floor LRV derailed at the station, causing scarring in the outbound platform near the pedestrian crossing on the Opera Place side of the station.
