= Northeastern University (disambiguation) =

Northeastern University is a university in Boston, Massachusetts, USA.

Northeastern University may also refer to:

- Northeastern University (China)
- Northeastern University (NEU) in Khon Kaen, Thailand
- Northeastern University – London

== See also ==
- Northeastern University (MBTA station), a light rail station on the campus of Northeastern University in Boston
- Northeastern State University in Tahlequah, Oklahoma, USA
- Northeastern Illinois University
- Northeastern College (disambiguation)
