= North East Island =

North East Island may refer to:

- North East Island, New Zealand, main island of the Snares Island group
- Oromaki / North East Island, New Zealand a small island in Manawatāwhi/Three Kings Islands group
- North East Island (Tasmania), Australia
- North East Island, Chuuk State (Truk) Federated States of Micronesia

== See also ==
- North East Island National Park, Queensland, Australia
- North East Penang Island, Malaysia
