= North Eastern Railway =

North Eastern Railway may refer to:

- North Eastern Railway (Canada), one of Canada's National Railways companies
- North Eastern Railway (India)
- North Eastern Railway (United Kingdom)

== See also ==
- Northeastern Railroad (disambiguation)
- North-East line (disambiguation)
- London and North Eastern Railway
- North Eastern Region of British Railways
- Northern and Eastern Railway
- Scottish North Eastern Railway
