= Arborway station =

Boston MBTA former subway station

Arborway
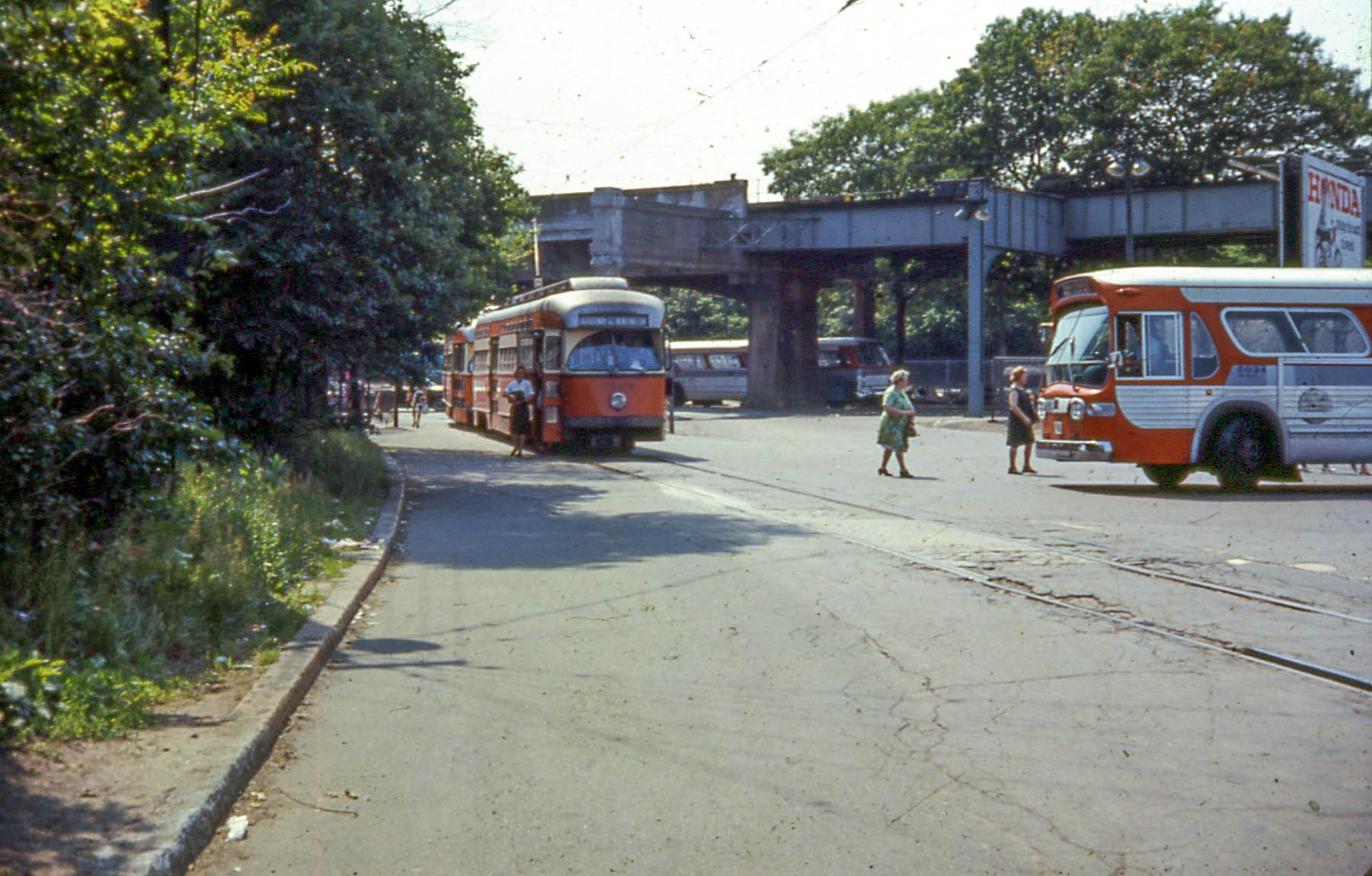
- A train arrives at Arborway in 1967

General information
- Coordinates: 42.3020°N 71.1114°W
- Platforms: 2
- Tracks: 1

History
- Closed: December 28, 1985

Former services
| Preceding station | MBTA | Following station |
|---|---|---|
| Terminus | Green Line E branch | Saint Mark Street toward Park Street |
Location

Arborway station was an MBTA light rail stop and bus transfer location in Boston, Massachusetts. It served the MBTA Green Line E branch. It was located in Arborway Yard near the Forest Hills station complex. It closed in 1985 when the outer section of the branch was temporarily—and ultimately permanently—closed.

== History ==
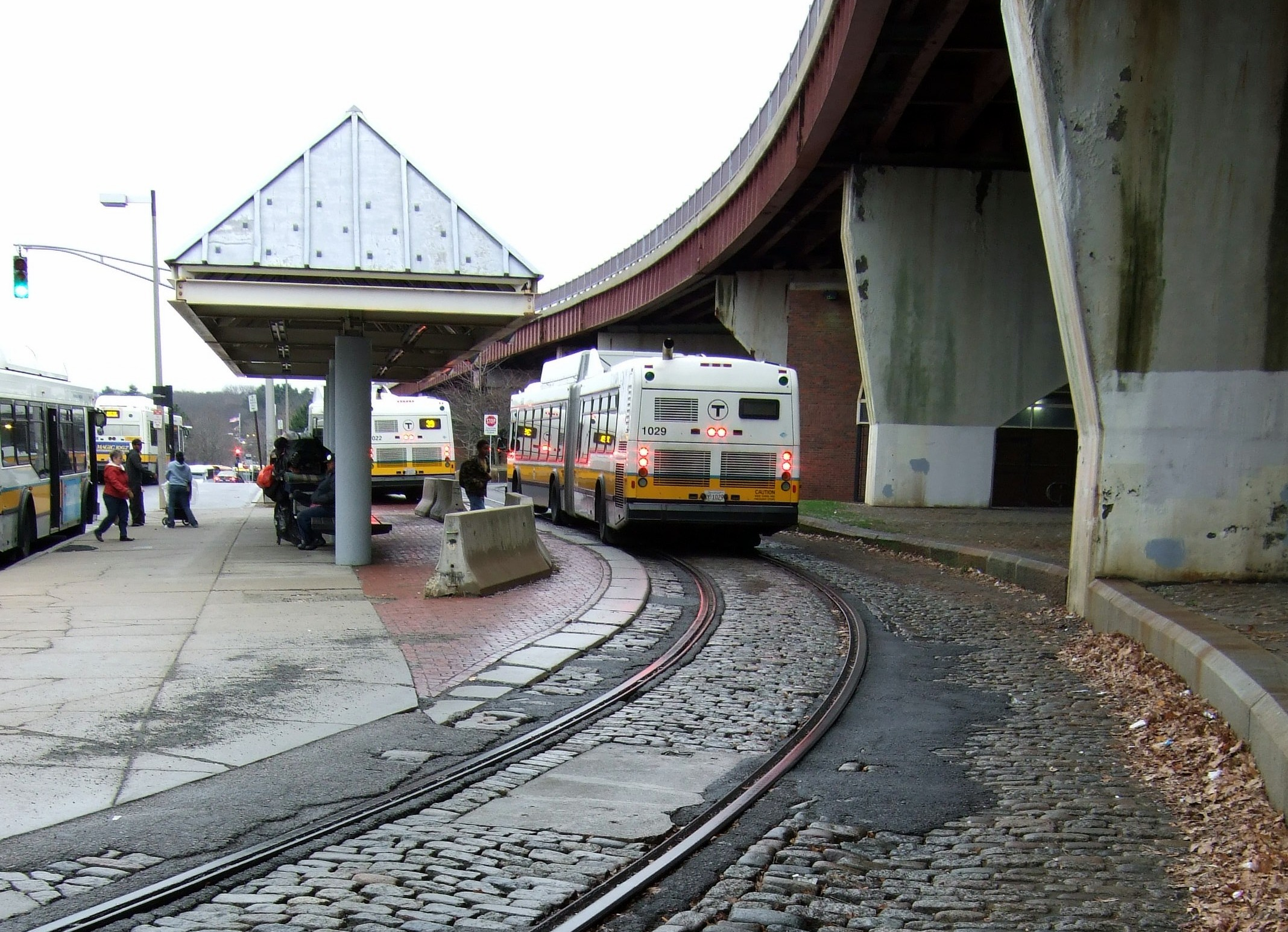
1987-built trolley loop at Forest Hills, never used by trolleys, was instead used for the route 39 bus service

On December 12, 1895, the West End Street Railway opened its Forest Hills Yard with a 12-track carhouse on the east side of Washington Street, serving newly electrified streetcar lines. The Boston Elevated Railway (BERy), successor to the West End, opened a second carhouse on the site two years later. In 1913, the BERy opened a ramp from the Washington Street Elevated into a small yard inside the complex. The ramp was disused after six months, and was removed in 1922.

On March 1, 1924, the BERy opened a streetcar transfer station inside the yard to relieve crowding at Forest Hills station. The Jamaica Plain via South Huntington line was soon extended to Arborway, improving connections with the other lines. The BERy replaced the older carhouses with a new six-track carhouse and a bus garage in 1924–25. Buses gradually replaced streetcars; all of the Arborway-terminating lines except the South Huntington line (Arborway Line, later Green Line E branch) were converted to bus by 1956. In 1962, the MTA opened its headquarters building at 500 Arborway.

Arborway closed on December 28, 1985 when the line was "temporarily" suspended and ultimately closed. When the new Forest Hills station was opened in 1987, a loop for the E branch was included as part of the station complex, so that Arborway would only be used for layovers and maintenance. No streetcar ever used the station, which was instead later used for route 39 buses from 2000 to 2017. The loop and the waiting area were removed in 2017 as part of the Casey Overpass replacement. The last streetcars were removed from the former Arborway carhouse in 2000. It was demolished in 2001 and replaced by a smaller facility for CNG-powered buses.

The MBTA plans to construct a two-level garage on the eastern portion of the site where the largely-disused 500 Arborway building is located. It will expand the Arborway-based fleet from 118 CNG buses to 200 battery-electric buses. This will include 60-foot (18 m) buses to move routes 28 and 39 from Southampton Garage and convert route 32 to 60-foot buses. The western portion of the site will be reserved for mixed-use development. The project was paused in mid-2025 due to a lack of funding, and would take 5-6 years to design and build once funded. State funding for the garage was announced in October 2025 as part of an $850 million transfer from the Commonwealth Transportation Fund to the MBTA.
