= Symphony station (MBTA) =

Subway station in Boston, Massachusetts, US

Symphony
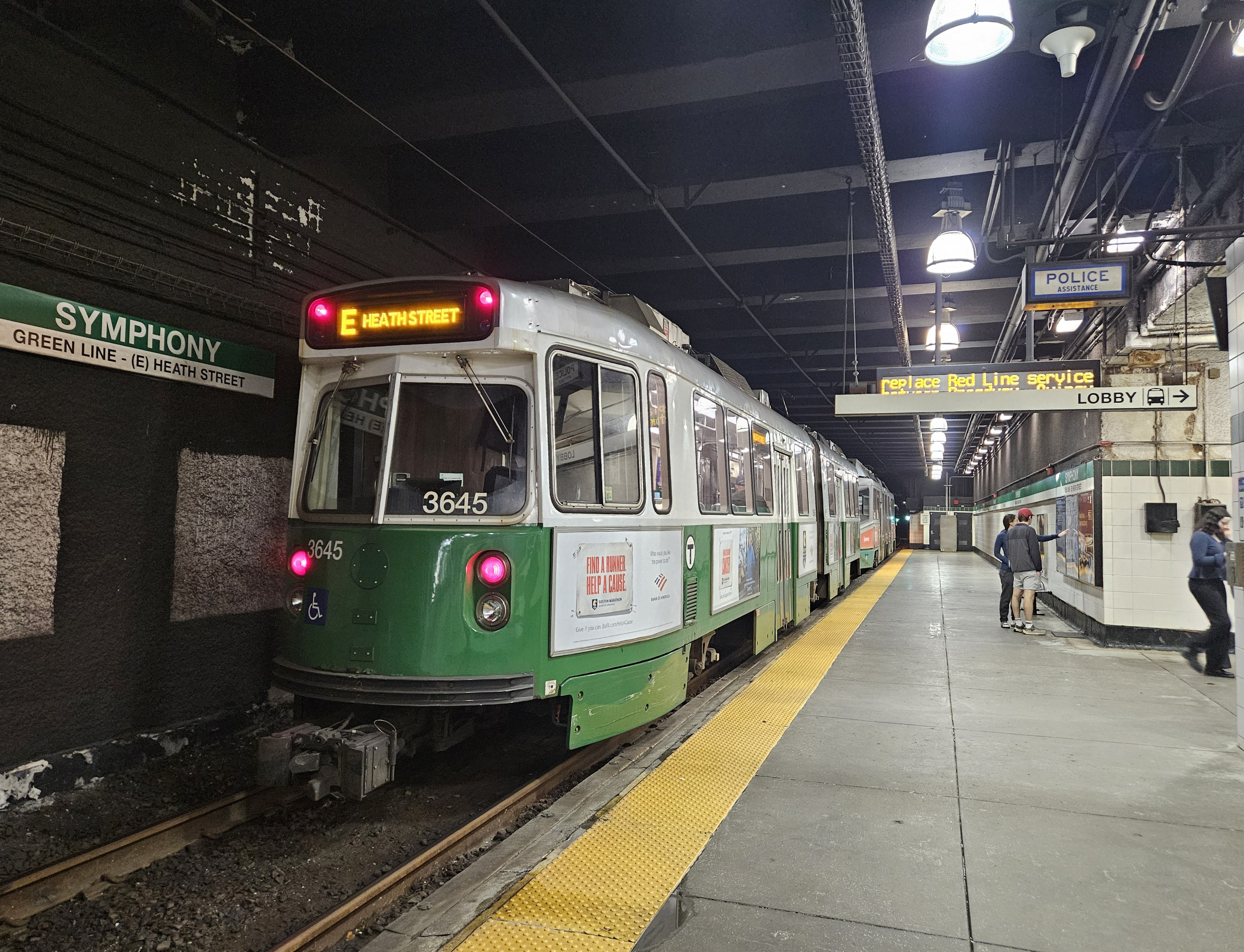
- An outbound train at Symphony station in May 2026

General information
- Location: Massachusetts Avenue at Huntington Avenue; Boston, Massachusetts
- Coordinates: 42.34277°N 71.08495°W
- Line: Huntington Avenue Subway
- Platforms: 2 side platforms
- Tracks: 2
- Connections: MBTA bus: 1, 39

Construction
- Structure type: Underground
- Accessible: No

History
- Opened: February 16, 1941
- Rebuilt: May 2026–Fall 2030

Passengers
- FY2019: 1,646 daily boardings

Services
Preceding station	MBTA	Following station
Northeastern University toward Heath Street	Green Line E branch	Prudential toward Medford/Tufts
Location

Symphony station is a temporarily closed underground light rail station in Boston, Massachusetts. It is normally served by the E branch of the Green Line, part of the MBTA subway system. The station is located under the intersection of Massachusetts Avenue and Huntington Avenue at the border of the Fenway–Kenmore and South End neighborhoods. It is named after the nearby Symphony Hall.

The station opened on February 16, 1941, as part of the Huntington Avenue Subway, which replaced surface streetcar tracks on part of Huntington Avenue. By 2026, Symphony was one of a small number of MBTA subway stations that were not accessible. Utility work for accessibility renovations began in 2023. After delays due to bids coming in higher than expected, a design and construction contract was issued in 2025. The station temporarily closed for about three years beginning May 30, 2026, to allow the work to take place. The renovations are expected to be completed in 2030.

== History ==
=== Opening ===
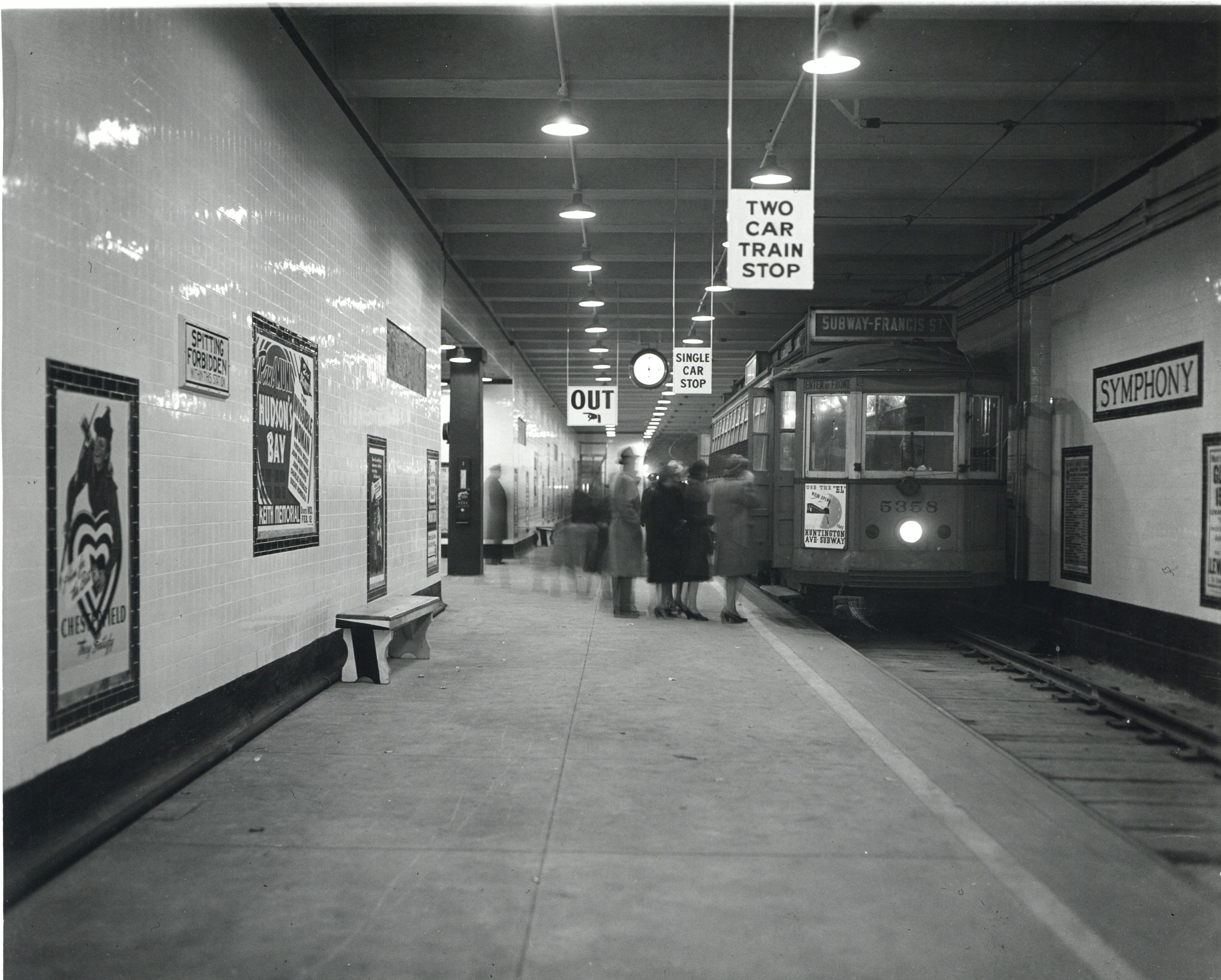
An outbound train at the station in 1941

The station opened February 16, 1941, as part of the Huntington Avenue Subway, which was a Works Progress Administration project that eliminated streetcars from Boylston Street and Copley Square in order to ease congestion. The tunnel ran from just west of Copley to just east of Opera Place, with intermediate stations near the major performance halls at Mechanics and Symphony.

Unusually for subway stations, the inbound and outbound tracks of the station are widely separated. The Huntington Avenue underpass was constructed at the same time as the station, with lanes for motor vehicles passing under Massachusetts Avenue at track level between the inbound and outbound platforms of the station. A sub-passage connected the two platforms; it was sealed off in the early 1960s when the MTA converted the station to no longer need employees present. Each platform had two entrance/exit stairways on opposite sides of Massachusetts Avenue, each of which split into a pair of stairways to street level.

In August 1978, the MBTA board authorized $91,750 for new glass entrance shelters for the station. Around that time, as part of the construction of the Symphony Plaza Towers, the stairways serving the inbound side were realigned, with each stairway from the station connecting to a single angled surface stairway rather than the original two. From January 3, 1981 to June 1982, the station was closed due to budget cuts.

Around 1973, the MBTA closed the fare collection booth at the station at night due to robberies, requiring passengers to pay on board trains instead. The fare collector was replaced with a token machine in 1994. The CharlieCard electronic fare collection system was installed at Symphony in 2006, making it fare-controlled at all operating hours.

=== Renovations ===
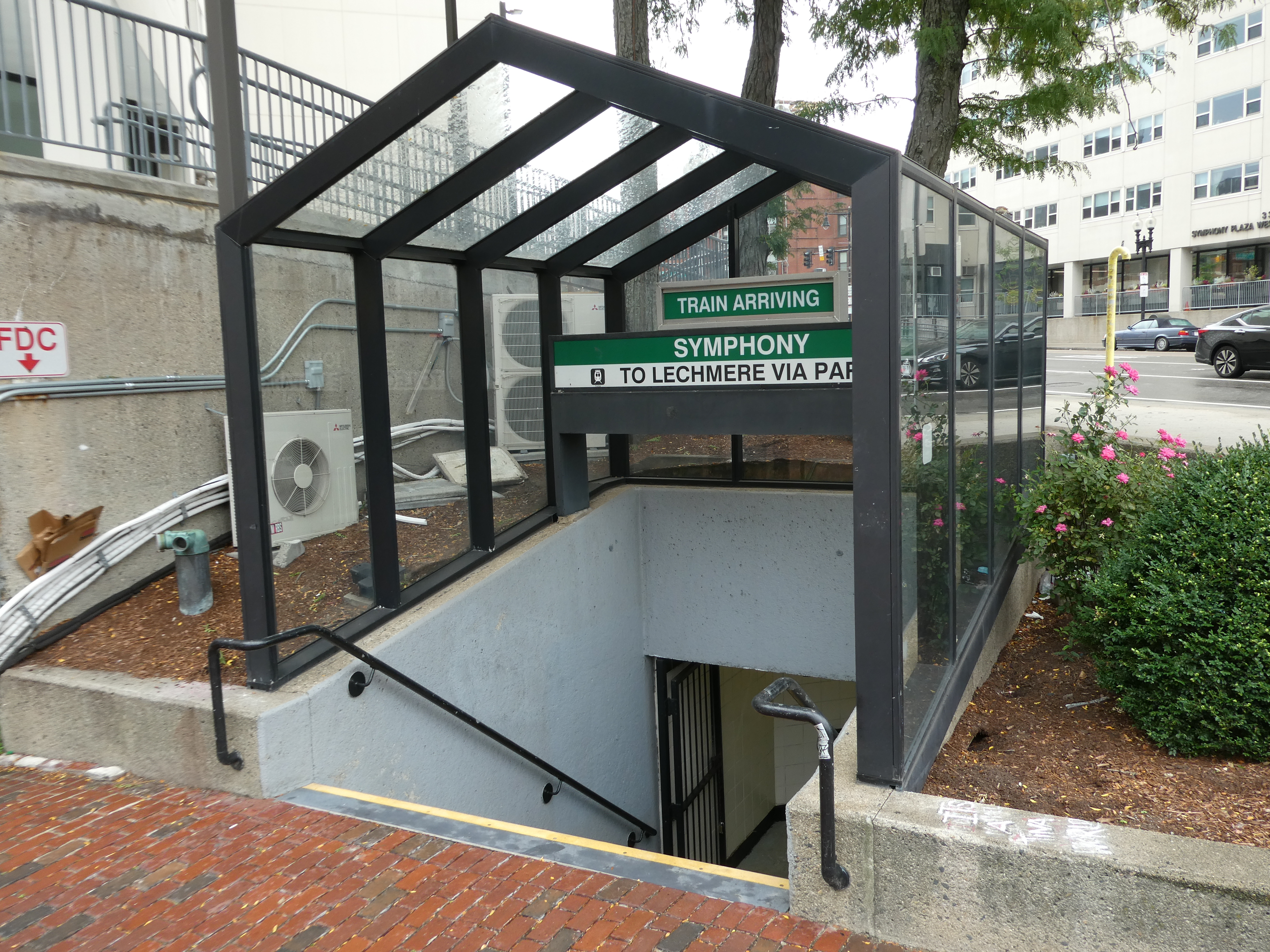
The existing entrances had only stairs and were not accessible.

Renovation work in November 2026

By 2026, Symphony was one of a small number of MBTA subway stations – along with Bowdoin, Hynes Convention Center, and Boylston – which were not accessible. Renovations were planned as part of the Light Rail Accessibility Project to make Symphony station fully accessible. The renovations include two elevators to each platform, platform modifications, and changes to other station elements to meet Americans with Disabilities Act of 1990 specifications. Planning proved difficult due to the number of historic structures in the area, as well as utility and code issues. Design reached 15% (conceptual) level in September 2011.

Plans presented in July 2017 added emergency exits and restrooms as well as the accessibility renovations. The MBTA issued a $6 million design contract in August 2019. Design reached 75% in March 2021; station design was completed in early 2022, with utility design completed midyear. The project was split into two construction phases in 2022. Utility work was bid in August–September 2022. In December 2022, the MBTA was awarded a $66.6 million Federal Transit Administration grant to fund the renovations.

Utility relocation work began in April 2023, with station work expected to begin a year later and last into 2026. In April 2024 the MBTA issued an solicitation for bids under the traditional design-bid-build procurement model. In June 2024, the MBTA reported that "[b]ids received far exceeded the estimated project cost and allocated budget", forcing re-evaluation of the project. The low bid was $119.9 million versus the MBTA estimate of $70.9 million. The MBTA reissued the solicitation using the construction manager at risk (CMAR) model in September 2024 with an expected contract value of $71 million. A construction industry lobbying group criticized the change to a CMAR model, which the MBTA had only used three times previously, and for re-bidding the project at the same cost without design changes.

Notice to proceed was given to the construction manager Suffolk in February 2025. In May 2025, the MBTA issued a change order to the construction manager, adding $14.9 million to the contract for construction at the unrelated Foxboro station, which was later be determined unlawful by the Massachusetts Attorney General. By December 2025, pre-construction design and planning work was expected to be completed in February 2026. The station was planned to temporarily close beginning in March 2026 for construction, with work to be completed by fall 2029. The MBTA approved a $151 million guaranteed maximum price for construction in February 2026. Construction began during a closure of the entire E Branch from May 30 to June 5, 2026, following which the station remained closed for renovations. The closure is expected to last 35 months (until mid-2029). The station will not be fully accessible immediately upon reopening, as the elevators are not expected to open until fall 2030.
