= Heath Street station =

Light rail station in Boston, Massachusetts, US

Heath Street
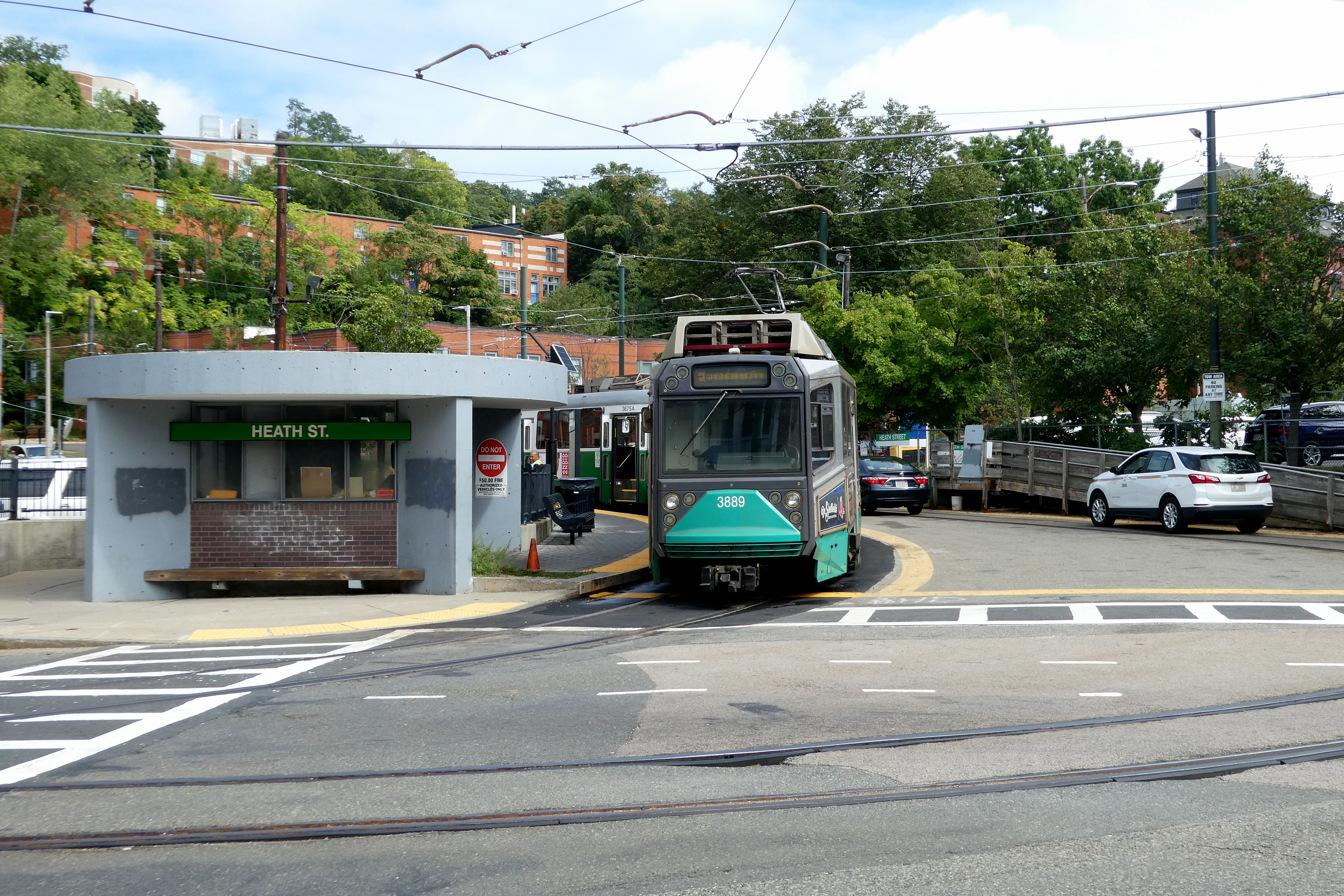
- A train at Heath Street station in September 2022

General information
- Location: South Huntington Avenue at Heath Street; Boston, Massachusetts
- Coordinates: 42.32831°N 71.11034°W
- Platforms: 2 side platforms
- Tracks: 2 (on a balloon loop)
- Connections: MBTA bus: 14, 39

Construction
- Accessible: Yes

History
- Opened: December 15, 1945
- Rebuilt: January 13, 2003; Fall 2027–Late 2029 (planned)

Passengers
- 2011: 820 daily boardings

Services
Preceding station	MBTA	Following station
Terminus	Green Line E branch	Back of the Hill toward Medford/Tufts
Former services
Preceding station	MBTA	Following station
VA Medical Center toward Arborway	Green Line E branch Arborway service – ended 1985	Back of the Hill toward Park Street
Location

Heath Street station (also called Heath Street/VA Medical Center) is a light rail stop that is the southern terminus of the Green Line E branch of the MBTA subway system. It is located at the intersection of South Huntington Avenue and Heath Street on the border between the Mission Hill and Jamaica Plain neighborhoods of Boston, Massachusetts. Heath Street station is accessible, with raised platforms to accommodate low-floor light rail vehicles. The MBTA plans to relocate the station to South Huntington Avenue between fall 2027 and late 2029 to accommodate the future Type 10 LRVs.

== History ==
=== Heath Street loop ===
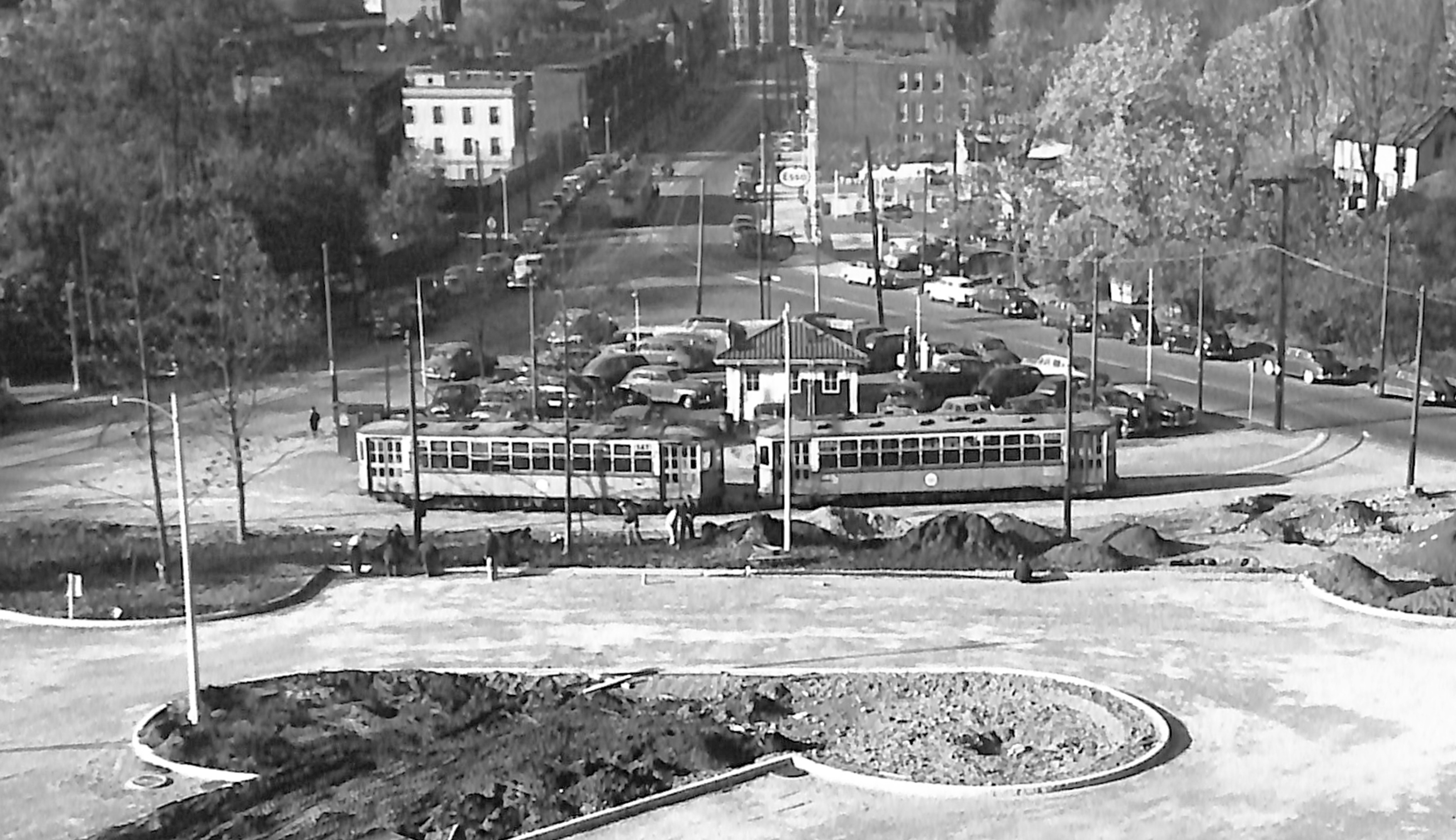
Streetcars at Heath Street loop in 1951

A loop at Heath Street was constructed in 1945 to allow use of the new PCC streetcars, which only had an operator's cab at one end and could not use crossovers like the one at Francis Street to reverse direction. Route 57 (Francis Street–Park Street) was extended to the new loop on December 15, 1945, and began using PCC streetcars on January 3, 1946. Until 1961, service on Huntington Avenue consisted of a Heath Street–North Station line and a Arborway–Park Street line. The Heath Street line was discontinued on September 11, 1961. Peak-hour service to the loop resumed on December 26, 1964; for a period in 1966, every other train on Huntington Avenue short-turned at the loop. Heath Street was the terminus of all weekday service (except nights) for three periods in 1977–1978 due to streetcar shortages and track work.

In 1972, the MBTA began planning a reconstruction of the median-running section of the line, then scheduled for 1973–1974. The work, including track replacement at the loop, eventually began in 1980 when the line was closed to modify the track and wires for the new LRVs. The line was cut back to Symphony on March 21, 1980; it was re-extended to Northeastern University (using LRVs) on June 21 and Brigham Circle on September 20, but Heath Street and Arborway service did not resume until June 26, 1982. Heath Street short turns were cut on February 11, 1983, when a snowstorm closed the line, and did not resume when it reopened.

On September 8, 1984, short turns using LRVs were extended to Heath Street. On December 28, 1985, the entire Arborway line was cut for repairs to the Huntington Avenue subway. Service to Brigham Circle resumed on July 26, 1986. Service as far as Heath Street resumed on November 4, 1989, after a September agreement between the state, the city, and the MBTA that also planned for resumption of Arborway service. Renovations to Heath Street station, including a circular concrete shelter/crew base, were part of $3.5 million in work performed to allow service to resume. Service past Heath Street to Arborway never resumed.

=== 21st century changes ===
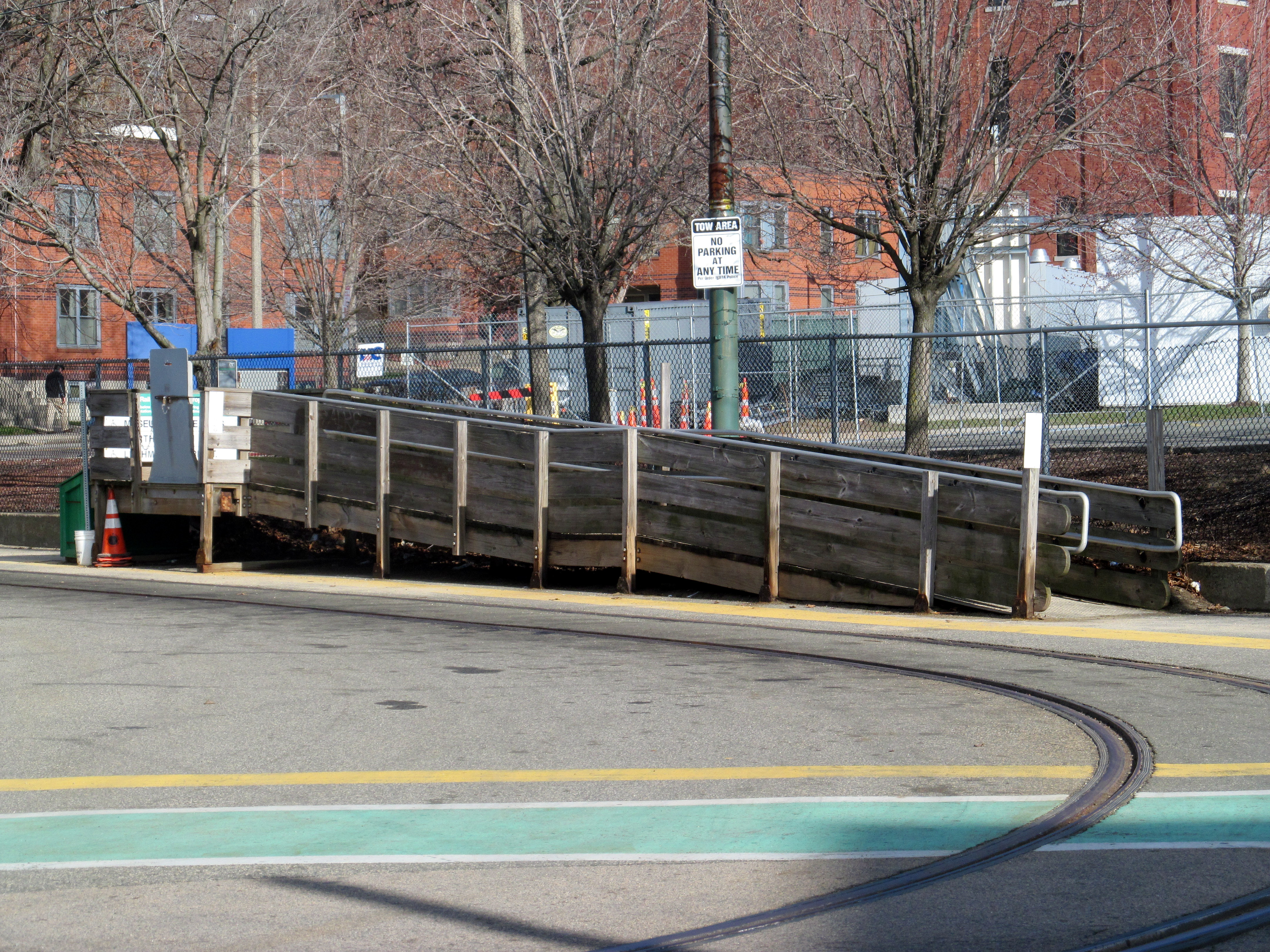
The mini-high ramp in 2016

In the early 2000s, the MBTA modified key surface stops with raised platforms for accessibility as part of the Light Rail Accessibility Program. Portable lifts were installed at Heath Street around 2000 as a temporary measure. The platform modifications – part of a $32 million modification of thirteen B, C, and E branch stations – were completed on January 13, 2003. The project included a wooden mini-high platform on the outer platform, allowing level boarding on older Type 7 LRVs.

As part of a series of service reductions due to a budget crisis, on July 1, 2012, the MBTA began terminating weekend service at Brigham Circle. The cutback was unpopular with local residents, who considered it an unnecessary inconvenience. On October 13, 2012, the cut was quietly reversed by reducing frequency on the branch slightly, thus allowing the same equipment to cover the full line at no additional cost. This was made official with the December 29, 2012 timetable.

In March 2011, the MBTA recommended stop changes to route 39 as part of the Key Routes Improvement Project. The outbound stops at Back of the Hill station and south of Heath Street were to be consolidated, and the inbound stop at Heath Street would be dropped due to its proximity to Back of the Hill. The outbound stop south of Heath Street was dropped in 2013, but the inbound stop was kept until June 21, 2020.

In 2021, the MBTA indicated plans to modify the Heath Street–Brigham Circle section of the E branch with accessible platforms to replace the existing non-accessible stopping locations. The new platforms are planned to be long enough to accommodate two 110-foot (34 m) Type 10 vehicles. Design work began in July 2023. In May 2025, the MBTA indicated that Heath Street station would also be rebuilt as part of the project. The loop would be closed; the new station would be designed to allow for a future extension on South Huntington Avenue. As of October 2026, design work is expected to be completed in late 2027, with construction taking place in 2028–2029.
