= Brigham Circle station =

Light rail station in Boston, Massachusetts, US

Brigham Circle
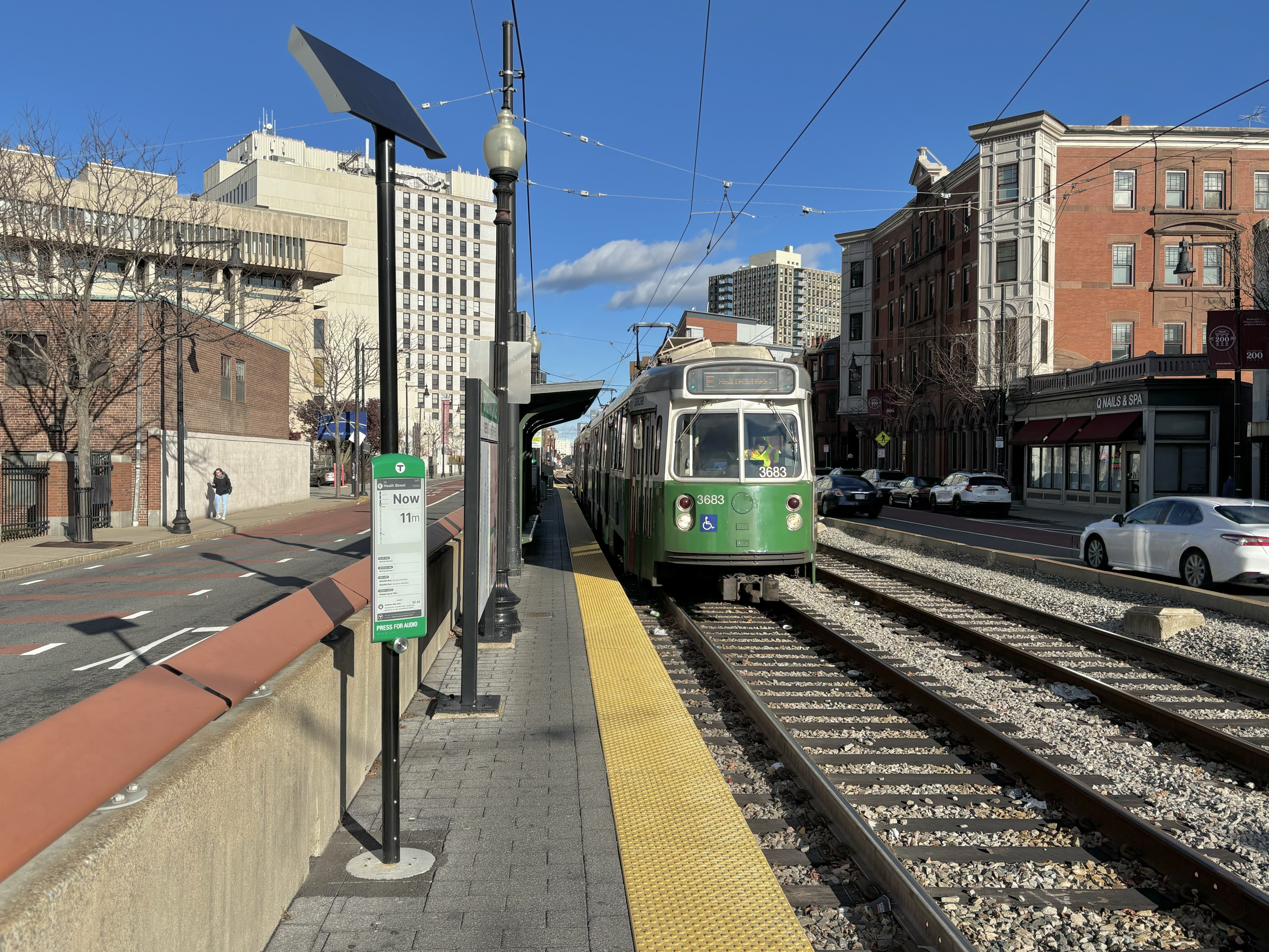
- An outbound train at Brigham Circle station in 2024

General information
- Location: Huntington Avenue at Francis Street; Boston, Massachusetts
- Coordinates: 42°20′4.53″N 71°6′13.35″W
- Platforms: 2 side platforms
- Tracks: 2
- Connections: MBTA bus: 39, 66

Construction
- Accessible: Yes

History
- Rebuilt: 2001–2003

Passengers
- 2013: 2,547 (weekday average)

Services
Preceding station	MBTA	Following station
Fenwood Road toward Heath Street	Green Line E branch	Longwood Medical Area toward Medford/Tufts
Location

Brigham Circle station is a light rail stop on the Green Line E Branch of the MBTA subway system, located just east of Brigham Circle in the Mission Hill neighborhood of Boston, Massachusetts. The two side platforms are staggered, with the outbound platform further west. Crosswalks across Huntington Avenue to the station are present at Brigham Circle (to the outbound platform), between the two platforms, and at Wigglesworth Street (to the inbound platform). Brigham Circle station is accessible, with raised platforms to accommodate low-floor light rail vehicles.

== Service ==
East of Brigham Circle, the E branch runs in a dedicated reservation in the median of Huntington Avenue; west of the circle is street running in mixed traffic to the terminus at Heath Street. Because of this, service is often terminated at Brigham Circle due to traffic conditions to preserve service frequency on the remainder of the line. At these times, the parallel 39 bus provides all service west of Brigham Circle. A facing point crossover is located just east of the station, allowing terminating trains to cross over to the inbound platform.

== History ==
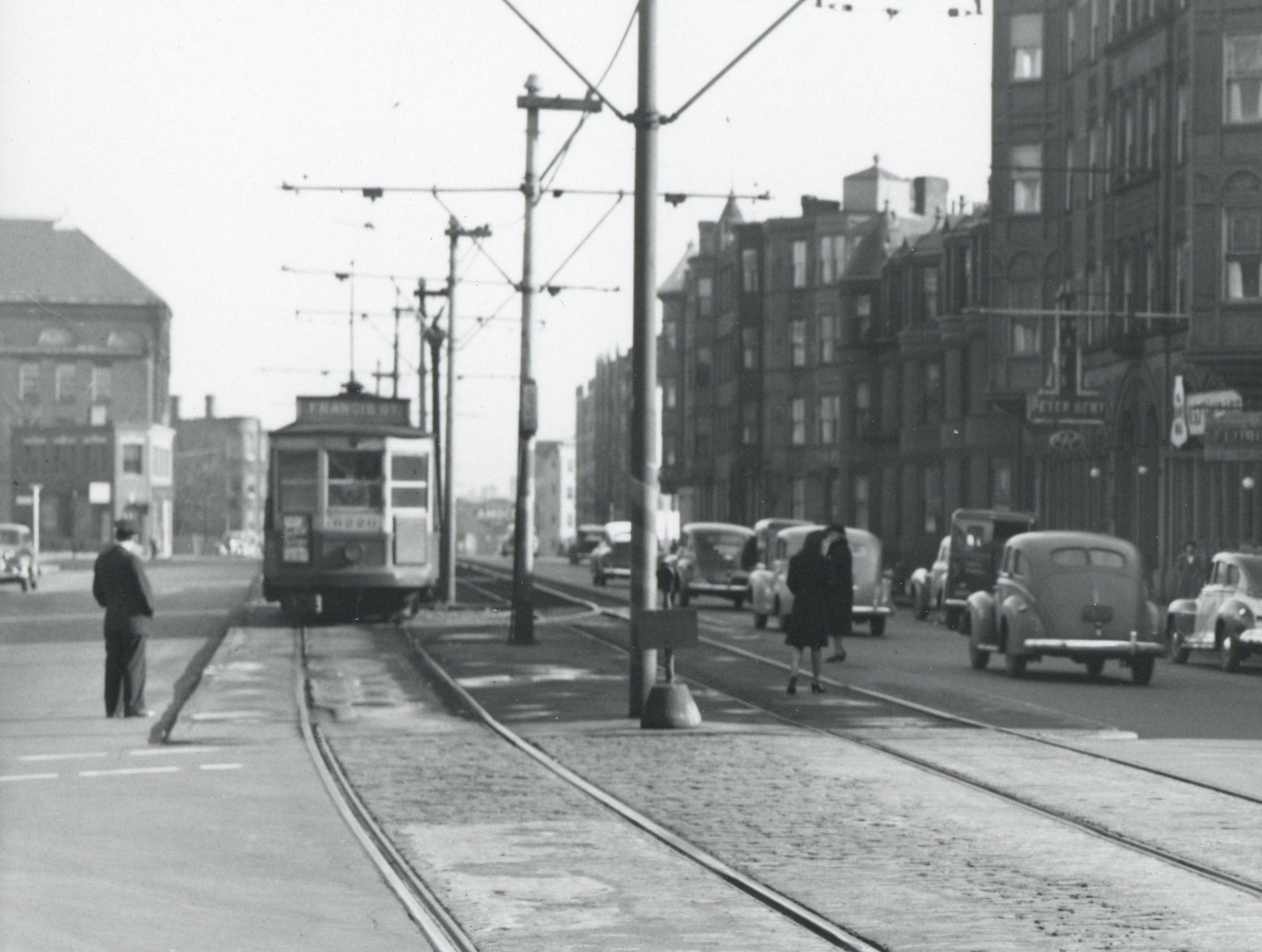
A streetcar at Brigham Circle station in 1943

Like other surface stops on the median-reservation section of the line, Brigham Circle (Francis Street) station had bare asphalt platforms. In 1972, the MBTA began planning a reconstruction of that section of the line, then scheduled for 1973-74. Three lightly used stops, including one at Wigglesworth Street, were to be closed. The work (minus the footbridge) were eventually done in 1980, when the line was closed to modify the track and wires for the new LRVs. The line was cut back to Symphony on March 21, 1980; it was re-extended to Northeastern (using LRVs) on June 21 and Brigham Circle on September 20. The inbound platform was moved east, with its east end at Wigglesworth Street.

In the early 2000s, the MBTA modified key surface stops with raised platforms for accessibility as part of the Light Rail Accessibility Program. The renovation of Brigham Circle - part of a $32 million modification of thirteen B, C, and E branch stations - was completed in 2003.

As part of a series of service reductions due to a budget crisis, on July 1, 2012 the MBTA began terminating weekend service at Brigham Circle. The cutback was unpopular with local residents, who considered it an unnecessary inconvenience. On October 13, 2012, the cut was quietly reversed by reducing frequency on the branch slightly, thus allowing the same equipment to cover the full line at no additional cost. This was made official with the December 29, 2012 timetable.
