= Central subway (Boston) =

System of rail tunnels in Boston, Massachusetts, US

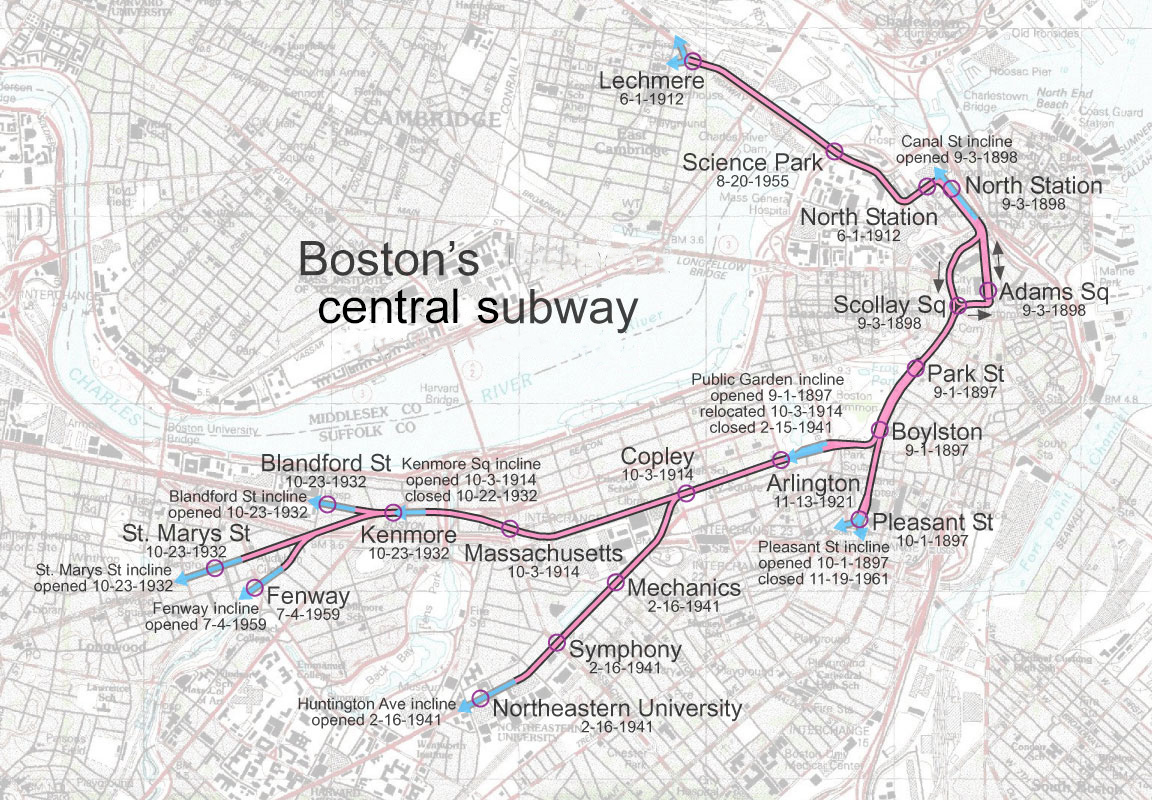
Map of Boston's central subway (and Lechmere Viaduct), showing portals used over time, with opening and closing dates

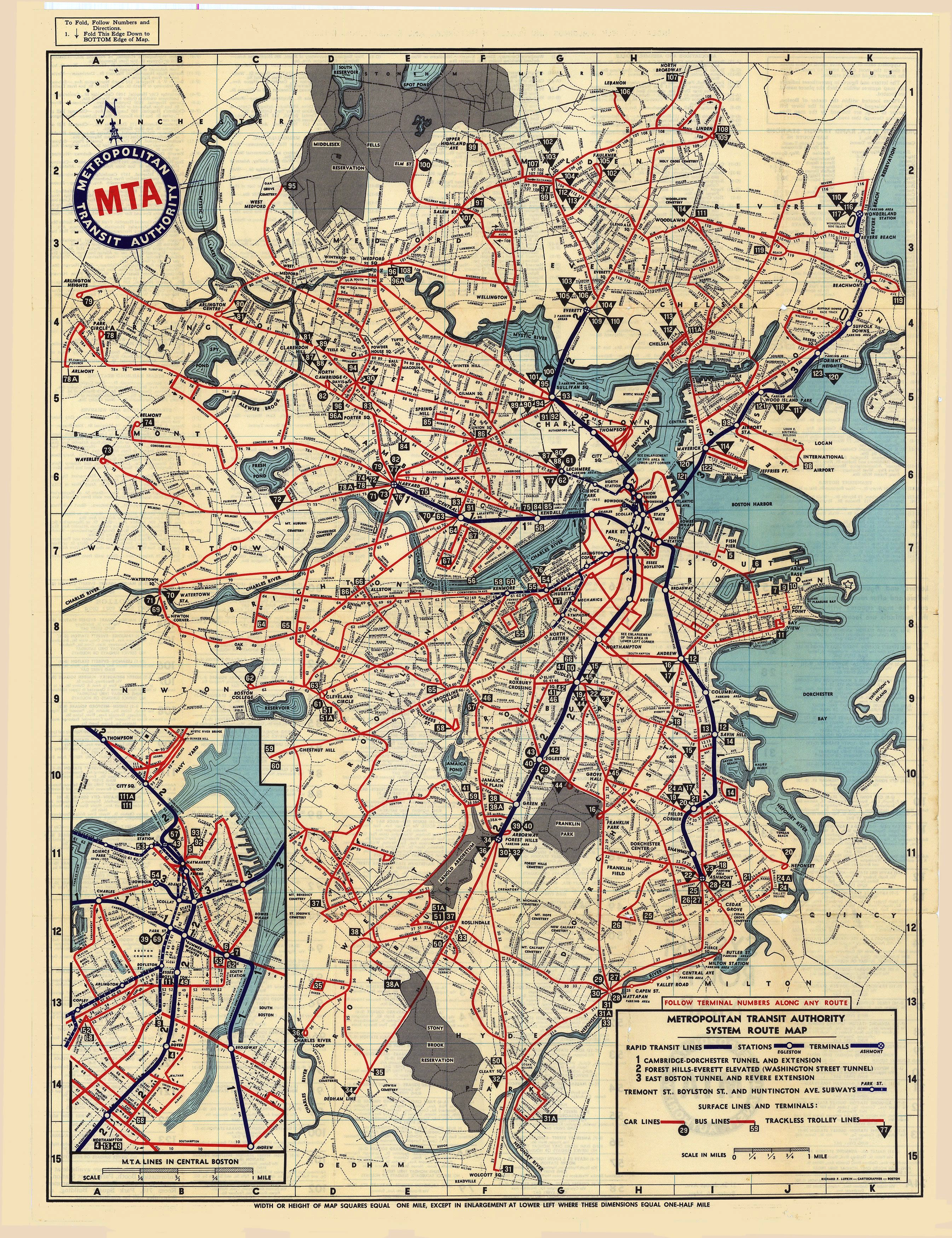
This 1954 MTA map refers to the tunnels as "TREMONT ST., BOYLSTON ST., AND HUNTINGTON AVE. SUBWAYS".

Boston's central subway is the system of tunnels through which the MBTA Green Line operates light rail transit (LRT or "trolley") service in the urban core of the city. The central subway comprises several tunnels built at different times, including the Tremont Street subway, the Boylston Street subway, and the Huntington Avenue subway.

Boston's subway operator, the MBTA, sometimes also refers to the Red Line and Orange Line heavy rail tunnels as part of the central subway tunnel.

== History ==
In the early and mid twentieth century, the central subway was also known as the trolley subway, and was used for at least seven different trolley routes and with a variety of equipment. The original vehicles used were early single-unit electric trams with trolley poles to pick up the electric power from an overhead wire, which Boston had a decade of experience with. When the Tremont Street subway opened in 1897, it handled over 280 trolleys per hour and took nearly 200 trolleys per hour off the congested Tremont Street.

Frank Sprague introduced electric multiple unit (EMU) trains in Chicago, also in 1897, and those came to Boston a few years later, not in the trolley subway but in the new "elevated", the Boston Elevated Railway (BERy), which mostly served the West End. By 1901, Boston had the first EMU trains running underground, using some of the tracks and modified platforms of the Tremont Street subway. These heavy-rail lines evolved into the MBTA's Red, Orange, and Blue lines, which shared some of the central subway tunnels and stations with the light-rail Green Line. In 1908, a new Washington Street tunnel was opened, parallel to the Tremont Street subway from Haymarket station to North Station, for the heavy-rail BERy traffic, restoring the Tremont Street subway to light-rail-only operation.
