= Green Line (MBTA) =

Light rail system in the metro Boston area

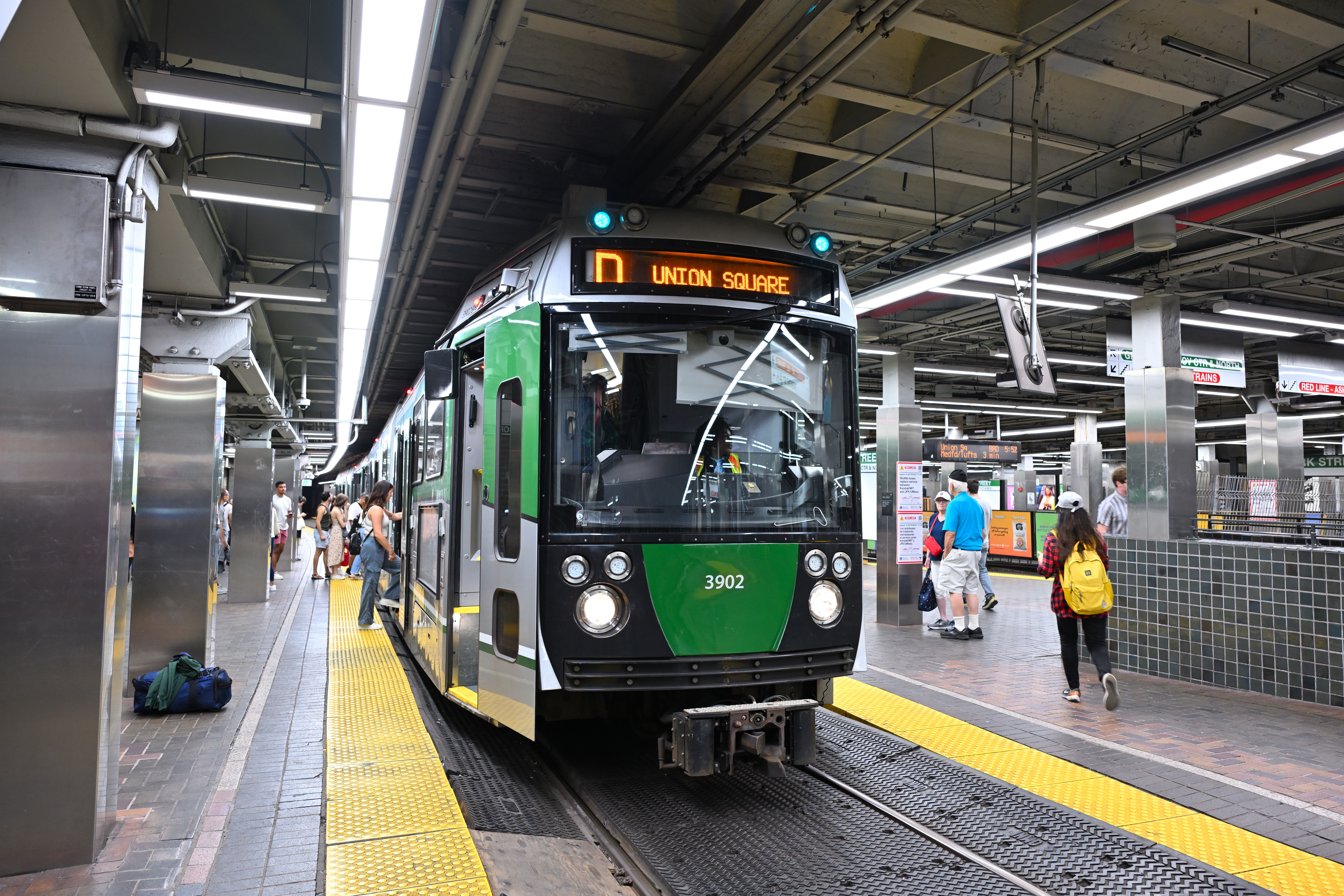
- Green Line train at Park Street station in 2024

Overview
- Owner: Massachusetts Bay Transportation Authority
- Locale: Boston, Brookline, Cambridge, Medford, Newton, and Somerville, Massachusetts
- Termini: North/east terminals: Union Square (D); Medford/Tufts (E); Government Center (B and C); South/west terminals: Boston College (B); Cleveland Circle (C); Riverside (D); Heath Street (E)
- Stations: 69

Service
- Type: Light rail
- System: MBTA subway
- Services: 4: B, C, D and E
- Rolling stock: Kinki Sharyo Type 7 AnsaldoBreda Type 8 CAF Type 9
- Daily ridership: 130,059 (July 2026)

History
- Opened: September 1, 1897 (Tremont Street subway)

Technical
- Line length: 26.7 miles (43.0 km)
- Num of tracks: 2
- Character: Subway, grade-separated surface ROW, viaduct, median reservation, street running
- Track gauge: 4 ft 8 1/2 in (1,435 mm) standard gauge
- Minimum radius: 33 feet (10 m)
- Electrification: Overhead line, 600 V DC
Route map

The Green Line is a light rail system run by the Massachusetts Bay Transportation Authority (MBTA) in the Boston, Massachusetts, metropolitan area. It is the oldest MBTA subway line, and with tunnel sections dating from 1897, the oldest subway in North America. It runs underground through downtown Boston, and on the surface into inner suburbs via six branches on radial boulevards and grade-separated alignments. With an average daily weekday ridership of 130,059 in July 2026, it is among the most heavily used light rail systems in the United States. The line was assigned the green color in 1967 during a systemwide rebranding because several branches pass through sections of the Emerald Necklace of Boston.

The four branches are the remnants of a large streetcar system, which began in 1856 with the Cambridge Horse Railroad and was consolidated into the Boston Elevated Railway several decades later. The branches all travel downtown through the Tremont Street subway, the oldest subway tunnel in North America. The Tremont Street subway opened its first section on September 1, 1897, to take streetcars off overcrowded downtown streets; it was extended five times over the next five decades. The streetcar system peaked in size around 1930 and was gradually replaced with trackless trolleys and buses, with cuts as late as 1985. The new D branch opened on a converted commuter rail line in 1959. The Green Line Extension project extended two branches into Somerville and Medford in 2022.

== Route description ==
The Green Line's core is the central subway, a group of tunnels which run through downtown Boston. The Tremont Street subway runs roughly north–south through downtown, with stations at Boylston, Park Street, Government Center, Haymarket, and North Station – all with connections to other lines of the MBTA subway system. The Boylston Street subway runs roughly east–west through the Back Bay neighborhood, with stations at Arlington, Copley, Hynes Convention Center, and Kenmore; it connects to the Tremont Street subway at Boylston. The Huntington Avenue subway diverges from the Boylston Street subway at a flat junction west of Copley, running southwest, with stations at Prudential and Symphony. A branch of the Tremont Street subway, disused since 1962, runs south from Boylston to the former Pleasant Street incline.

The Green Line has four western surface branches, each with a letter designation:

- The B branch runs west in a tunnel from Kenmore, surfacing in the median of Commonwealth Avenue at Blandford Street. It runs 4.2 miles (6.8 km) on Commonwealth Avenue through Boston University, Allston, and Brighton to Boston College station.
- The C branch runs southwest in a tunnel from Kenmore, surfacing in the median of Beacon Street at Saint Mary's Street. It runs 2.9 miles (4.7 km) on Beacon Street through Brookline to Cleveland Circle station.
- The D branch diverges from the C branch tunnel southwest of Kenmore, surfacing at Fenway station. It runs 9.7 miles (15.6 km) though Brookline and Newton along the grade-separated Highland branch (a former Boston and Albany Railroad commuter rail line) to Riverside station.
- The E branch runs southwest through the Huntington Avenue subway from Copley, surfacing in the median of Huntington Avenue at Northeastern University station. It runs 2.6 miles (4.2 km) along Huntington Avenue and South Huntington Avenue to Heath Street, with the outer 0.7 miles (1.1 km) (west of Brigham Circle) in mixed traffic rather than a dedicated median. Until 1985, the line continued south through Jamaica Plain to Arborway.

B and C branch service terminates at Government Center, while D and E branch service continues north from downtown Boston. North of North Station, the line inclines up to the Lechmere Viaduct, which crosses the Charles River with an elevated station at Science Park. The elevated Lechmere station is located on the Green Line Extension viaduct, which continues north to a flying junction with two branches:

- The Union Square Branch runs 0.7 miles (1.1 km) west to Union Square station via the Fitchburg Line right-of-way. It is operated as part of the D branch.
- The Medford Branch runs 3.0 miles (4.8 km) northwest to Medford/Tufts station via the Lowell Line right-of-way. It is operated as part of the E branch.

=== Former branches ===
The Green Line A branch was the northernmost of the branches, running from the Blandford Street portal (still used by the B branch), west to Watertown, mostly street-running. The 57 bus replaced the streetcar line in 1969. The A branch diverged from Commonwealth Avenue west of Boston University and ran to a terminus in Watertown, across the Charles River from Watertown Square, until 1969. Although the route-letter scheme had been introduced two years prior to its closure, the "A" designation was never signed on streetcars to Watertown. It was, however, included in the destination signs on the Boeing-Vertol LRVs ordered in the mid-1970s, when reopening service to Watertown was under consideration. The "A" line tracks remained in non-revenue service to access maintenance facilities at Watertown until 1994.

The Pleasant Street portal hosted two services in its final days. Route 9 to City Point ended in 1953; route 43 to Egleston was cut back to Lenox Street in 1956, cut back to the portal in 1961, and ended operation in 1962. Prior to that, route 48 serviced Tremont Street to Dover Street and Washington Street, ending at Dudley, and last running in 1938.

The last two routes to continue beyond the Canal Street portal both ran to Sullivan. The 92 ran via Main Street, last running in 1948, and the 93 via Bunker Hill Street last ran in 1949. Until 1997, trains continued to use the portal and its North Station surface station as a terminal.

In addition to the lines that later became the E branch, the Ipswich Street line split in Brookline, one branch running into the current "E" tracks and into the Boylston Street portal, and the other running up Brookline Street to end at Massachusetts Avenue station. These were truncated in 1932 into a shorter route from Brookline Village to the subway via the Boylston Street portal.

The last "foreign" cars to operate in the subway were those of the Eastern Massachusetts Street Railway, running from the Canal Street portal to the Brattle Loop at Scollay Square until 1935. It was then that the old Mystic River Bridge to Chelsea was closed to streetcars and the lines were replaced by bus service; the next year the Boston Elevated Railway (BERy) bought the Eastern Mass Chelsea Division and through-routed it with its lines connecting to the East Boston Tunnel at Maverick.

== Rolling stock ==
Like the three other MBTA subway lines, the line uses standard gauge tracks. However, instead of heavy rail metro rolling stock, the Green Line uses modern streetcars (light rail vehicles) as heavy rail stock would be inappropriate for the surface branches with their numerous grade crossings.

=== Listing ===
==== Active fleet ====
Rolling stock as of September 2026:

Year built	Manufacturer	Model	Image	Length	Width	Fleet numbers	Quantity
1986–1988	Kinki Sharyo	Type 7 LRV		72 ft (22 m)	104 in (2.64 m)	3600–3699	100 (70 active, all overhauled)
1997	Kinki Sharyo	Type 7 LRV		72 ft (22 m)	104 in (2.64 m)	3700–3719	20 (14 active, all overhauled)
1998–2007	AnsaldoBreda	Type 8 LRV		74 ft (23 m)	104 in (2.64 m)	3800–3894	95 (72 active)
2018–2020	CAF USA	Type 9 LRV		74 ft (23 m)	104 in (2.64 m)	3900–3923	24 (all active)

Non-revenue work cars include #3615 and #3669.

==== Retired fleet ====
Only MBTA operated vehicles are included here, not cars from the Boston Elevated Railway era.

Years in Service	Manufacturer	Model	Image	Length	Width	Fleet numbers	Quantity
1976–2007	Boeing Vertol	US Standard Light Rail Vehicle		71 ft (22 m)	104 in (2.64 m)	3400–3543	144 (31 units cancelled)
1937–1985 (Note: 10 PCC streetcars are currently in revenue service on the Mattapan Line.)	Pullman Standard	PCC streetcar		48 ft (15 m)	100 in (2.54 m)	3000–3346	344 (2 cars scrapped before 1964)

==== Future ====
Years Built	Manufacturer	Model	Image	Length	Width	Fleet numbers	Quantity
2027–2031	CAF USA	Type 10 LRV		114 ft (35 m)	104 in (2.64 m)	4001–4102	102 (pilot car #4002 arived in September 2026, to enter service in 2027)

=== History of rolling stock ===
==== Early rolling stock ====
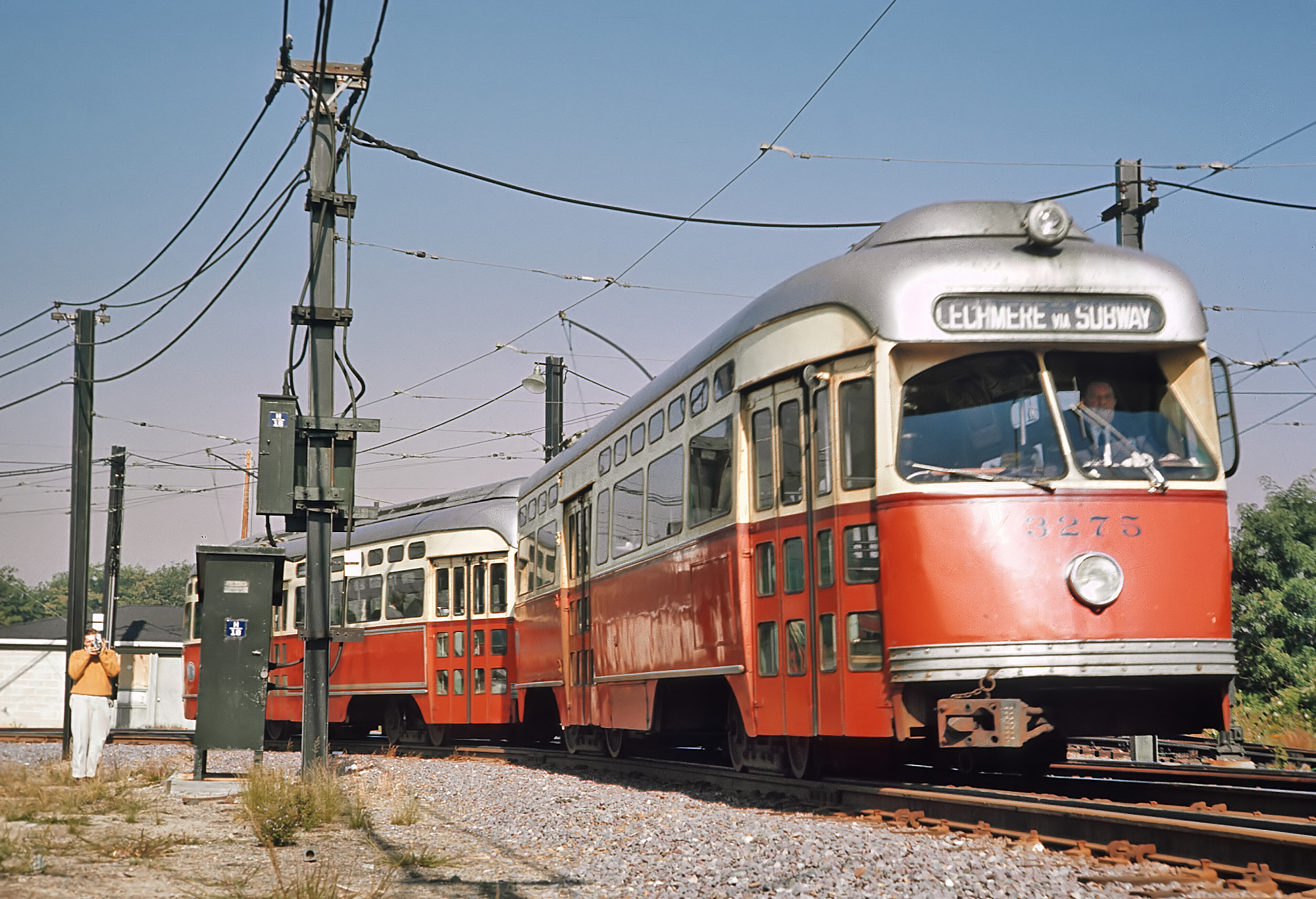
PCC streetcars on the D branch in 1965

When it opened at the end of the 19th century, the Tremont Street subway was not intended as a full-scale rapid transit line, but to allow ordinary streetcars to bypass the worst street congestion in downtown Boston. Operations by several different companies were eventually consolidated into the Boston Elevated Railway, which ran a mixture of car types. After receiving a test unit in 1937, the BERy began to standardize on PCC streetcars, acquiring 320 units between 1941 and 1951 plus an additional 25 in 1959 to phase out the last older cars. Beginning in 1923, all streetcars on the system were painted orange for maximum visibility in traffic. In 1971, the MBTA began painting Green Line streetcars in a green and white scheme to match the new line name.

Two older streetcars are on display on the unused outer inbound track at Boylston station, which formerly carried cars coming from the Pleasant Street portal. Car #5734, a Type 5 A-1 car built in 1924 and retired in 1959, is owned by the Seashore Trolley Museum, but resides semipermanently in Boston. PCC #3295, built in 1951 and retired in 1986, is owned by the MBTA. The cars were formerly used for fantrips, the most recent one being in 1998.

==== Boeing LRV ====
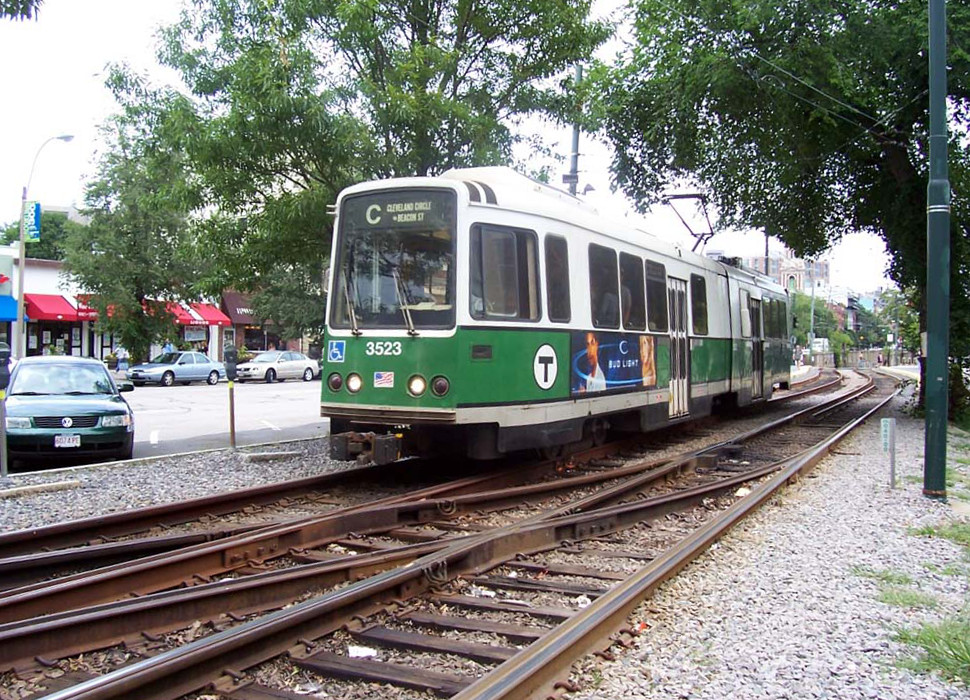
Boeing LRV on the C branch in 2005

In the early 1970s, light rail—which had largely disappeared from North America after the slow decline of streetcar systems from the 1920s to the 1950s—was reintroduced as a method of urban renewal less expensive than conventional metro systems. In 1971, as part of a program to supply further work to defense contractors as the Vietnam War wound down, the Urban Mass Transit Administration selected Boeing Vertol as systems manager for a project to design a new generic light rail vehicle. The UMTA hoped that this "US Standard Light Rail Vehicle" would jumpstart the development of transit lines just as the standardized PCC streetcars had done decades prior.

Boston (with its older streetcar tunnel systems) and San Francisco (with a new Muni Metro streetcar tunnel being built as part of BART construction) were chosen as the testbeds for this new rolling stock. The vehicle was designed as the largest rolling stock that would fit through the Tremont Street tunnel, the Muni Metro's Twin Peaks Tunnel, and SEPTA's subway–surface lines tunnel. The new cars were faster—a top speed of 50 miles per hour (80 km/h) versus the PCC's 36 miles per hour (58 km/h)—and had an articulated middle section for higher capacity.

Boeing began construction of 175 cars for the MBTA in May 1973. The first LRVs entered service on the D branch in December 1976 but were immediately beset with problems. Certain cars frequently derailed on tight turns in the Riverside, Boston College and Lechmere yards. Battery trays, air conditioners—mounted under the cars, continually drawing in dirt and debris from under the car when in the tunnels—and air compressors all suffered numerous failures; the plug-style doors had trouble sealing properly; and traction motors failed sooner than expected.

Desperate for reliable rolling stock, in 1977 MBTA launched an overhaul program to extend the availability of its older PCC cars. A total of 34 cars, primarily out-of-service wrecks and parts cars, were rebuilt to as-new condition. As of 2022, some of these rebuilt PCC cars still run on the Mattapan Line.

After years of fighting between the MBTA and Boeing-Vertol, both sides reached a settlement in 1979. MBTA was allowed to reject the final 40 SLRVs, and Boeing would return $40 million to MBTA for the cost of repairs and modifications to several cars.

==== Modern fleet ====
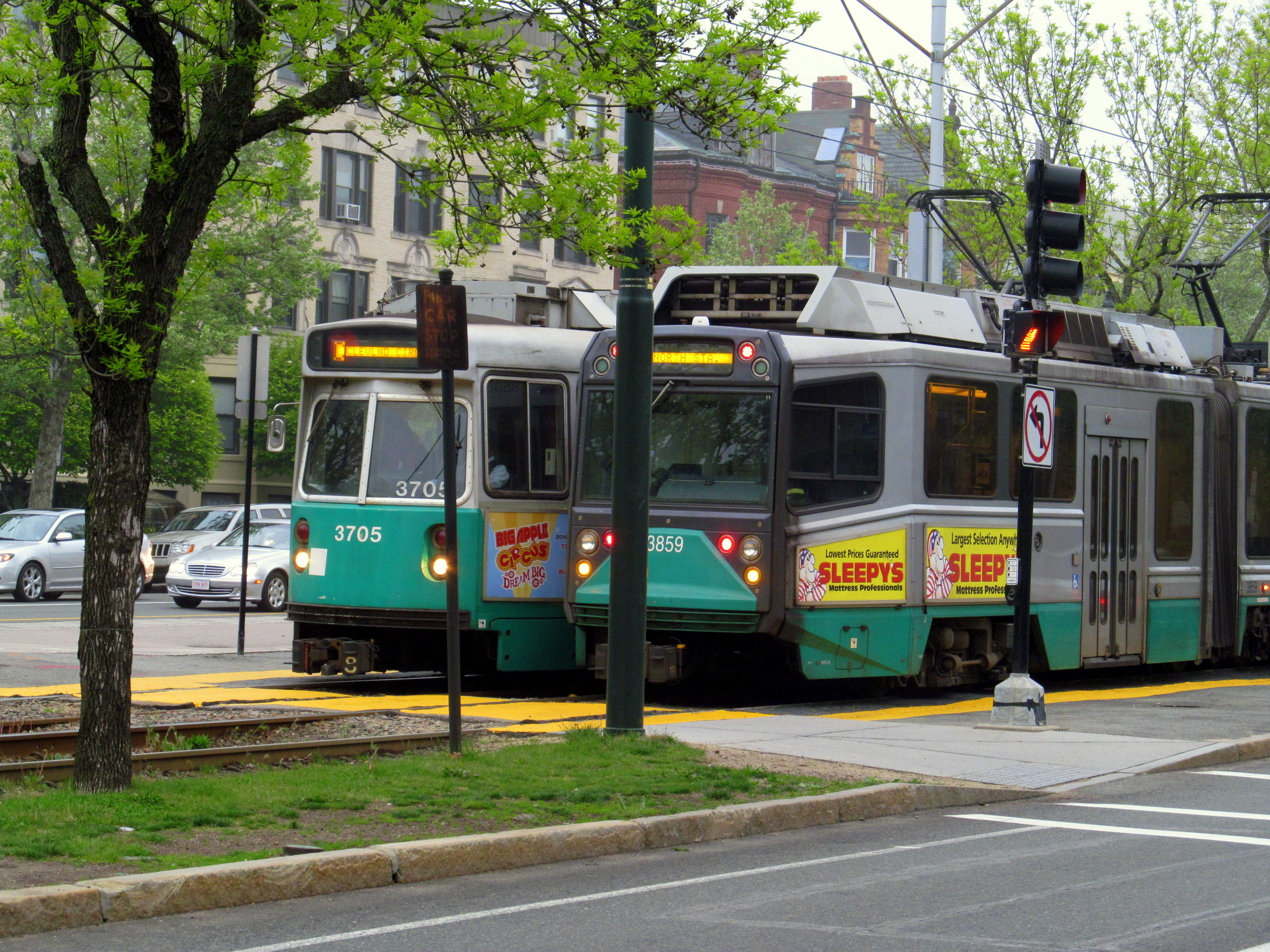
Type 7 (left) and Type 8 streetcars at Tappan Street in 2012

In the early 1980s, with a final settlement with Boeing in place, MBTA started looking for new equipment to supplement and replace the problematic LRVs.

In 1980, the MBTA tested Canadian Light Rail Vehicles for three months to determine whether they could be used on the Green Line. The MBTA ultimately found them unsuitable.

Ultimately, the MBTA purchased LRVs from the Japanese firm Kinki Sharyo. These Type 7 were designed with the best features of the US SLRV, the Canadian LRV, and the PCC cars. A total of 120 Type 7 vehicles were purchased, 100 were delivered between 1986 and 1988, and an additional 20 cars ordered and delivered in 1997.

Low-floor LRVs were added starting in 1998, allowing for accessible boarding directly from slightly raised platforms. MBTA ordered 100 of these Type 8 cars from Italian company AnsaldoBreda. The first Type 8s entered revenue service in March 1999, and quickly proved problematic and difficult to maintain: the first cars failed every 400 miles (640 km), far short of the 9,000 miles (14,000 km) specified by the MBTA, and were prone to derailment at higher speeds as well as brake problems, echoing the problems with the Boeing stock. In December 2004, the MBTA canceled orders for the cars still to be delivered as part of the authority's nine-year, US$225 million deal with Breda. One year later, in December 2005 the MBTA announced that it had entered into a restructuring of the deal, reducing the order to 85 cars (with spare parts to be provided in lieu of the 15 remaining cars), and providing for the remaining payment under the original deal only if the cars met performance requirements. Construction of the last car under the order was completed on December 14, 2006. Ultimately, 10 additional cars would be assembled and delivered in late 2007, with five spare shells retained (95 cars in service). The MBTA was criticized for their failure to assess Bredas' reliability before entering into the deal, and during delivery. The agency was also forced to spend an additional US$9.5 million to modify tracks to prevent derailments and the Type 8 fleet was unable to be used on the D branch (where cars reach full speed) after those modifications were complete in 2008.

As the final Type 8s were delivered, the last of the Boeing-Vertol cars were retired in March 2007 and all except ten of the cars were scrapped. Of the remaining cars, six were sold to the US Government and are now in Pueblo, Colorado for testing purposes, one was given to the Seashore Trolley Museum, and three were retained by the MBTA for work service.

In 2006, as part of a legal settlement, the MBTA committed to always operate at least one low-floor car in each train, with no trains consisting only of Type 7 cars.

Of the 120 Type 7 cars, 103 were overhauled by Alstom in Hornell, New York. The work includes new propulsion systems, climate control systems and interiors as well as exterior work. The pilot car for the program left in October 2012 and was returned in November 2014, with the last car overhauled in April 2019.

===== Type 9 =====
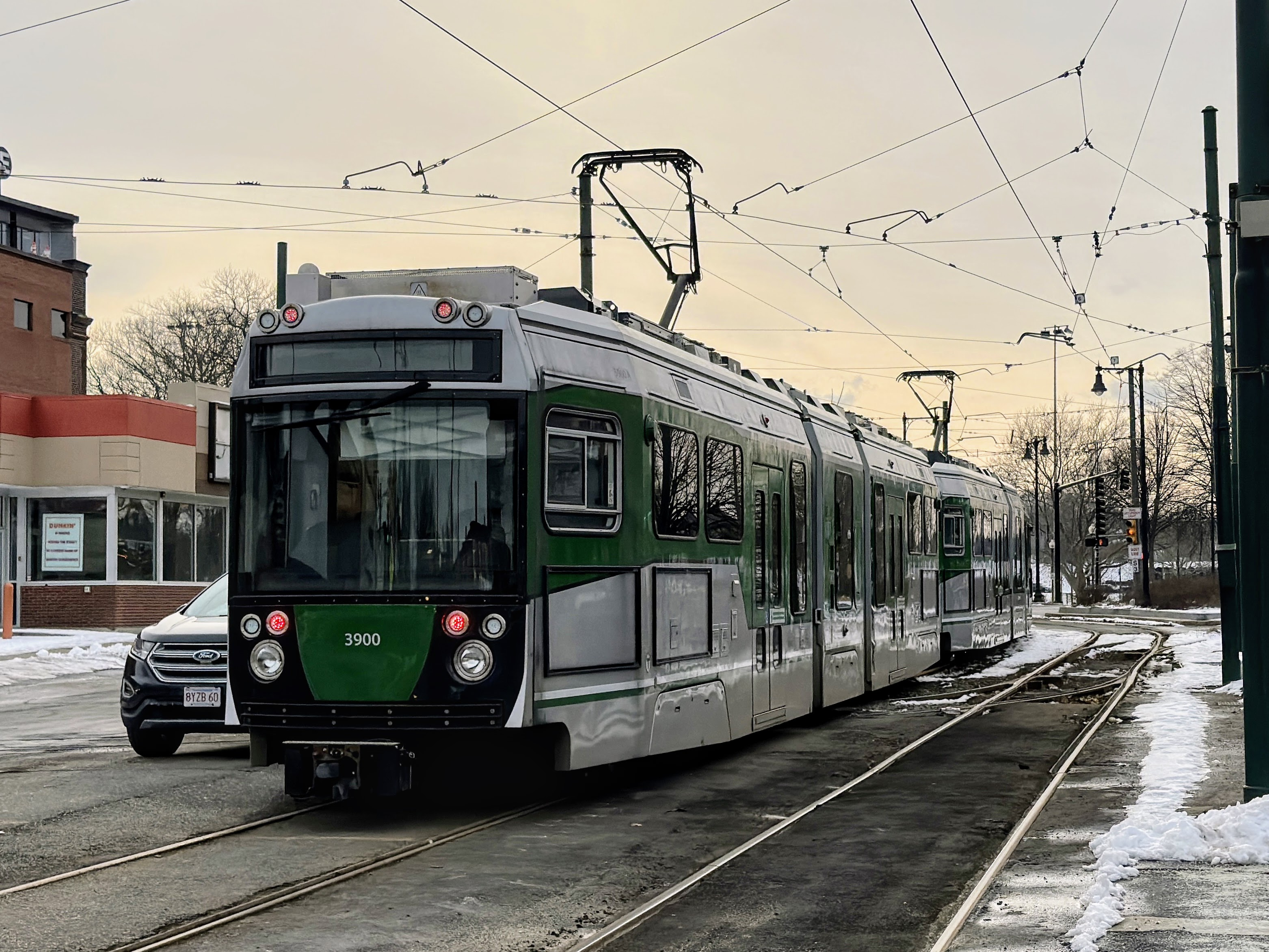
Type 9 LRV at Cleveland Circle in 2023

Twenty-four new Type 9 Green Line cars were delivered between 2017 and 2020. Revenue service began in late 2018 and all 24 cars were planned to enter service by the fall of 2019, although actual acceptance continued through 2021. The Type 9 cars will provide additional rolling stock to allow for Green Line Extension operations, and will not replace any of the existing fleet. The cars were made by CAF USA, Inc., with the shells and frames made in Spain, and final assembly and testing done at their plant in Elmira, New York. As of March 2017, the first unit had been expected to enter passenger service in Spring 2018, with all 24 cars in service by the end of the year. The first Type 9 car, #3900, began revenue service on December 21, 2018.

==== Future fleet ====
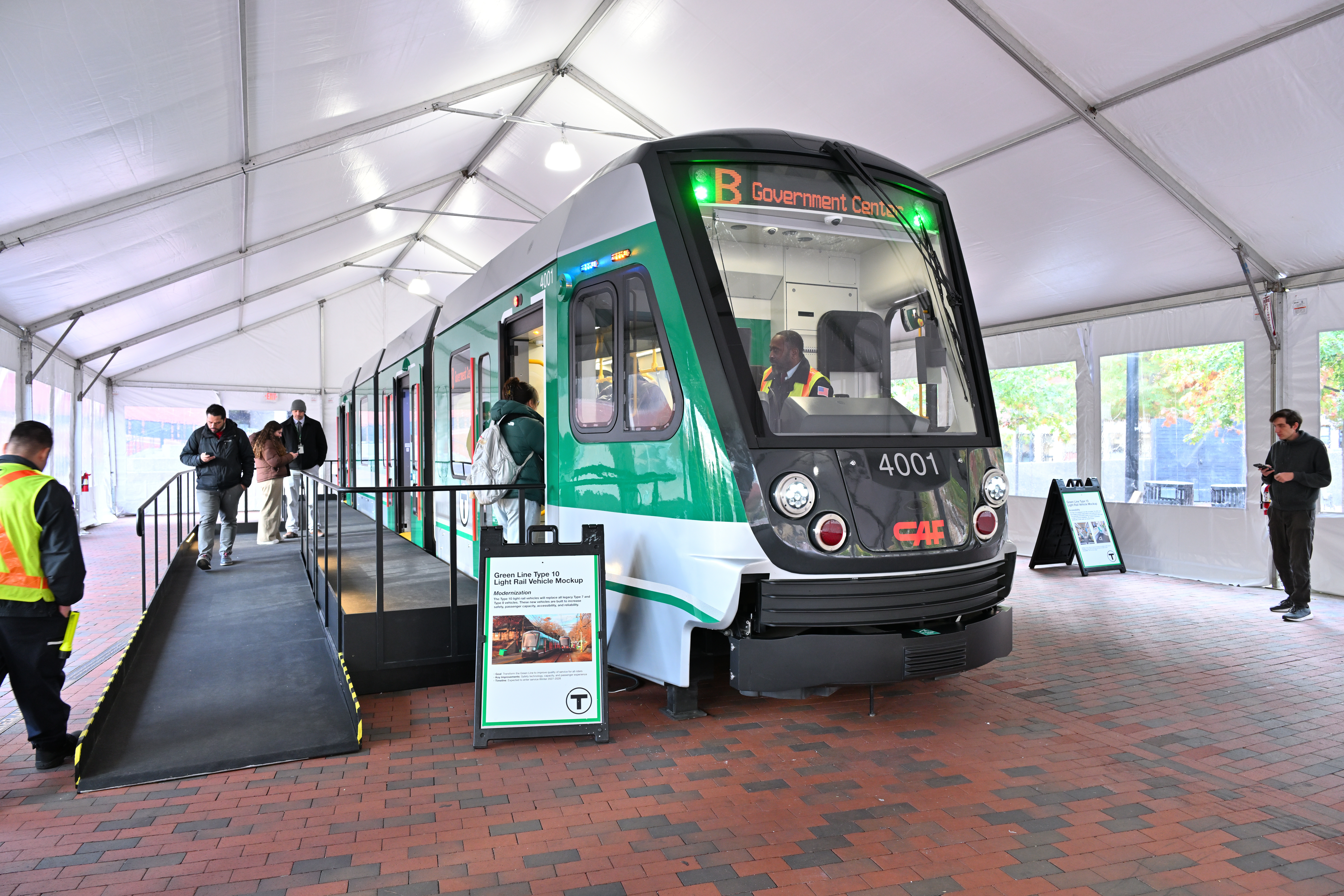
A full-scale mockup of the planned Type 10 "Supercar" LRV

Planning for a Type 10 fleet—which would replace all Type 7 and Type 8 cars in the mid-2020s—began in 2018 with plans for a fully low floor fleet. At 113 feet (34 m) long, Type 10 cars would be significantly longer than the existing fleet, and carry twice as many passengers as existing cars. The MBTA released a request for proposals in December 2019, with notice to proceed expected to be given in 2021. In June 2021, the MBTA indicated that the initial order would be for 102 LRVs operating as single cars, with two-car trains deferred for a later project with federal funding. Manufacturer bids were due in July 2021.

The MBTA awarded an $811 million contract to CAF USA on August 31, 2022, to manufacture 102 seven-segment Type 10 "Supercar" LRVs. Four pilot vehicles were initially to be delivered in spring 2026, with deliveries of two LRVs per month from spring 2027 to spring 2031, though an update given in April 2026 pushed back the pilot vehicle delivery back to the end of 2026, with the other dates unchanged. The contract included options for additional LRVs. As a separately-funded project, Lake Street Yard will be fully reconstructed to support Type 10 vehicles, with Riverside Yard and the GLX Vehicle Maintenance Facility also modified. When the Type 10 cars are delivered, the Type 9 fleet is expected to be transferred over to the Mattapan Line, replacing the PCC streetcars. On September 30, 2026, the first of the pilot green line cars had arived at Riverside.

== Accessibility ==
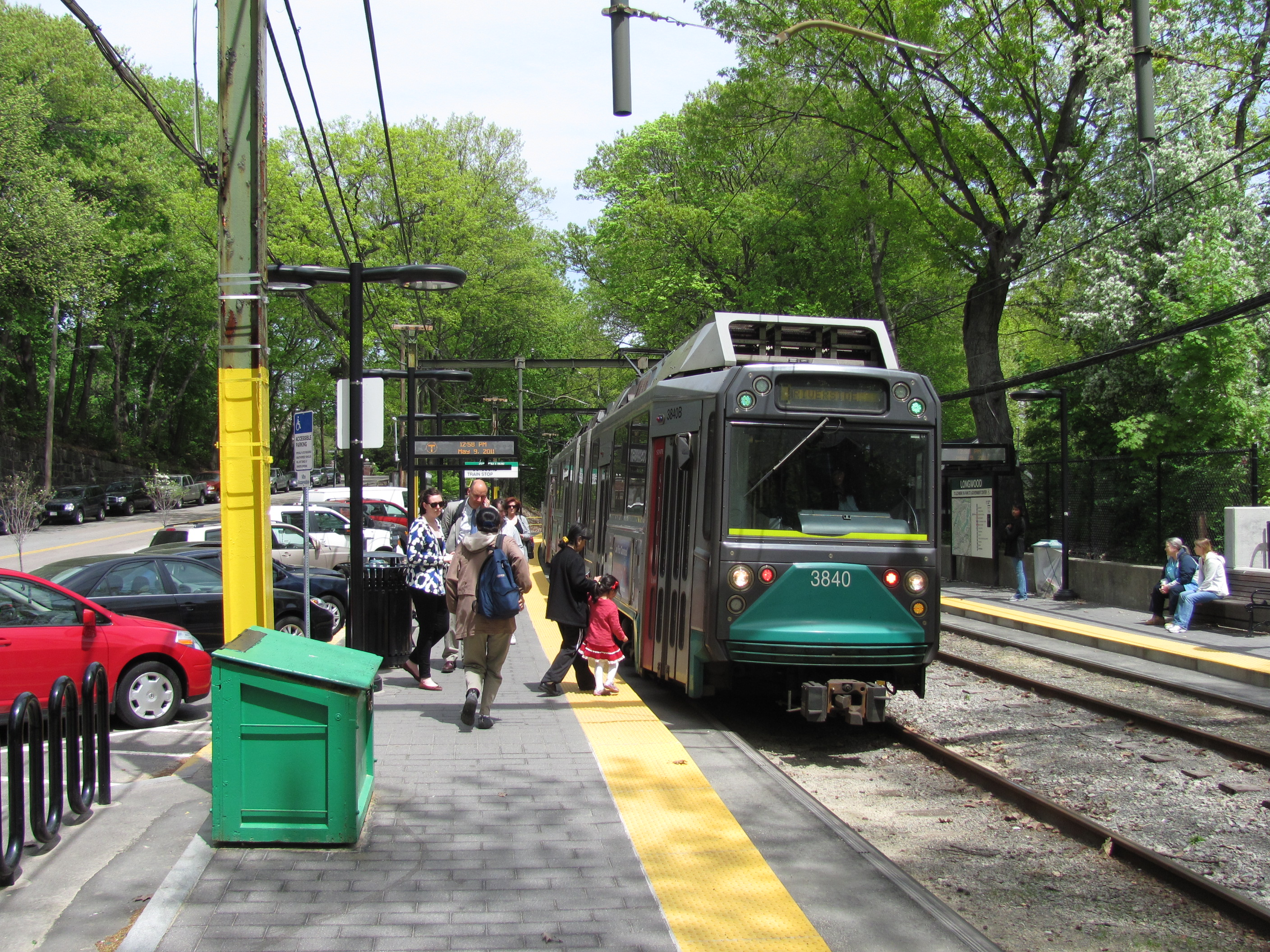
A low-floor Type 8 car at Longwood station, which has slightly raised platforms for accessible boarding

The Red Line, Blue Line, and Orange Line run rapid transit cars and use stations with high platforms level with the car floor providing easy access for the disabled. The Green Line originated as a streetcar line, and used a variety of streetcars before converting to light rail vehicles.

Originally all the Green Line stations had platforms at track level, and passengers had to ascend several steps up into the vehicles. This limited accessibility for persons with disabilities. To address this issue and comply with changing federal and state laws, additional facilities have been added:

- Wheelchair lifts have been provided at some stops. They are rolled up to the car door and the lift mechanism is operated using a hand crank. They are quite time-consuming to operate, causing significant delays when used during peak periods.
- Short platforms level with car floors, accessed by ramps, were installed just before or after selected stations. Because the car door arrangement required a large gap between the platform and the car, a bridge plate attached to the raised platform had to be positioned after the train stopped with a door at that platform.
- The MBTA has followed the worldwide trend of operating low-floor streetcars. Platforms are being raised slightly to about the height of a street curb. Low-floor cars have remotely controlled bridge plates at the center doors to allow wheelchairs and strollers to reach the car floor a few inches higher. As of 2022, the D branch will be the first branch to be completely retrofitted with raised platforms as part of this program.

== History ==
Beginning in the 1850s, Boston sprouted a large network of horsecar lines, the first public transit in the city. The West End Street Railway was created by the state legislature in 1887 to build a single line, but soon consolidated many of the existing lines into a single privately owned system with consistent fares and route designations. The Allston – Park Square line (which served the general area of the A branch) was the first section to be converted to electric traction in 1889. It used modified existing horsecars outfitted with Frank J. Sprague's revolutionary electrical equipment, which had first been demonstrated the previous year in Richmond, Virginia. In 1897, the West End Street Railway property was handed over to the Boston Elevated Railway in the form of a 24-year lease, and the companies were ultimately combined.

By the early 1890s, the sheer quantity of streetcars during peak periods was clogging the streets of downtown Boston. The Tremont Street subway, the first passenger subway in North America, was opened in stages in 1897 and 1898, with underground stations at Boylston, Park Street, Scollay Square, Adams Square, and Haymarket. The Main Line Elevated was run through the tunnel from 1901, displacing through-running streetcars, until it was rerouted to its own Washington Street Tunnel in 1908, and the streetcars were returned to the Tremont tunnel.

Though initially intended merely to clear streetcars from the busiest sections of downtown streets, the Tremont Street subway became useful as a rapid transit service in its own right. The 1912 completion of the Causeway Street Elevated and Lechmere Viaduct extended grade-separated service to Lechmere Square in Cambridge, and in 1922 the Lechmere transfer station was built. In 1914, the Boylston Street subway opened as a westward extension to just short of Kenmore Square, and in 1933 Kenmore station and short tunnel extensions towards two surface lines were added. In 1941, the Huntington Avenue subway and its two additional underground stations removed the last surface streetcars from downtown Boston.

Beginning in the 1930s, the massive surface streetcar system was "bustituted" with buses and trackless trolleys which had lower operating costs and more flexible routes. As the 1950s closed out, the only remaining streetcar lines were the Watertown Line, Commonwealth Avenue Line, Beacon Street Line, Arborway Line, and the Lenox Street Line plus several short turn services. In 1959, the Boston and Albany Railroad's Highland Branch was converted to the Riverside Line, a fully grade-separated suburban service. In 1961, the last through service to Lenox Street via the Pleasant Street portal ended, though a Pleasant Street – Boylston shuttle continued for one more year. In 1963, part of the original subway was rebuilt under Government Center, abandoning and partially demolishing Adams Square station.

In 1947, the now-bankrupt BERy was replaced by the public Metropolitan Transit Authority (M.T.A.). The new agency was unpopular, even spawning a popular protest song; in 1964, it was replaced with the Massachusetts Bay Transportation Authority which had an expanded funding area to preserve suburban commuter rail lines. In 1967, as part of a systemwide rebranding that included new station names and color names for the transit lines, the remaining streetcar services were designated the "Green Line" because several of them traveled near the Emerald Necklace park system. The streetcar lines were given letter designations: "A" to the Watertown Line, "B" to the Commonwealth Avenue Line, "C" to the Beacon Street Line, "D" to the Riverside Line, and "E" to the Arborway Line.

The Watertown Line ran mostly in mixed traffic after diverging from Commonwealth Avenue; it was permanently replaced with buses in 1969. The section of the Arborway Line past Heath Street was "temporarily" – ultimately permanently – bustituted in 1985. In 2001, with new low-floor streetcars entering service, the MBTA began retrofitting underground stations and major surface stops with low raised platforms for accessibility for all. In 2004, the Causeway Street Elevated was replaced with a new tunnel under the Boston Garden, which consolidated the Orange Line and Green Line at a new North Station "superstation", while continuing to connect to Commuter Rail service north of Boston.

The name "Green Line" was assigned in 1967 as part of a major reorganization of the MBTA system's branding. In the 1970s, the Green Line and all other MBTA lines were re-evaluated by the Boston Transportation Planning Review for region-wide efficacy and future modernization alternatives initiated as far as physical plant and operating measures.

The Green Line Extension to Union Square, Somerville and Tufts University in Medford opened in 2022. A parallel extension of the Somerville Community Path opened in 2023.

== Operations and signaling ==
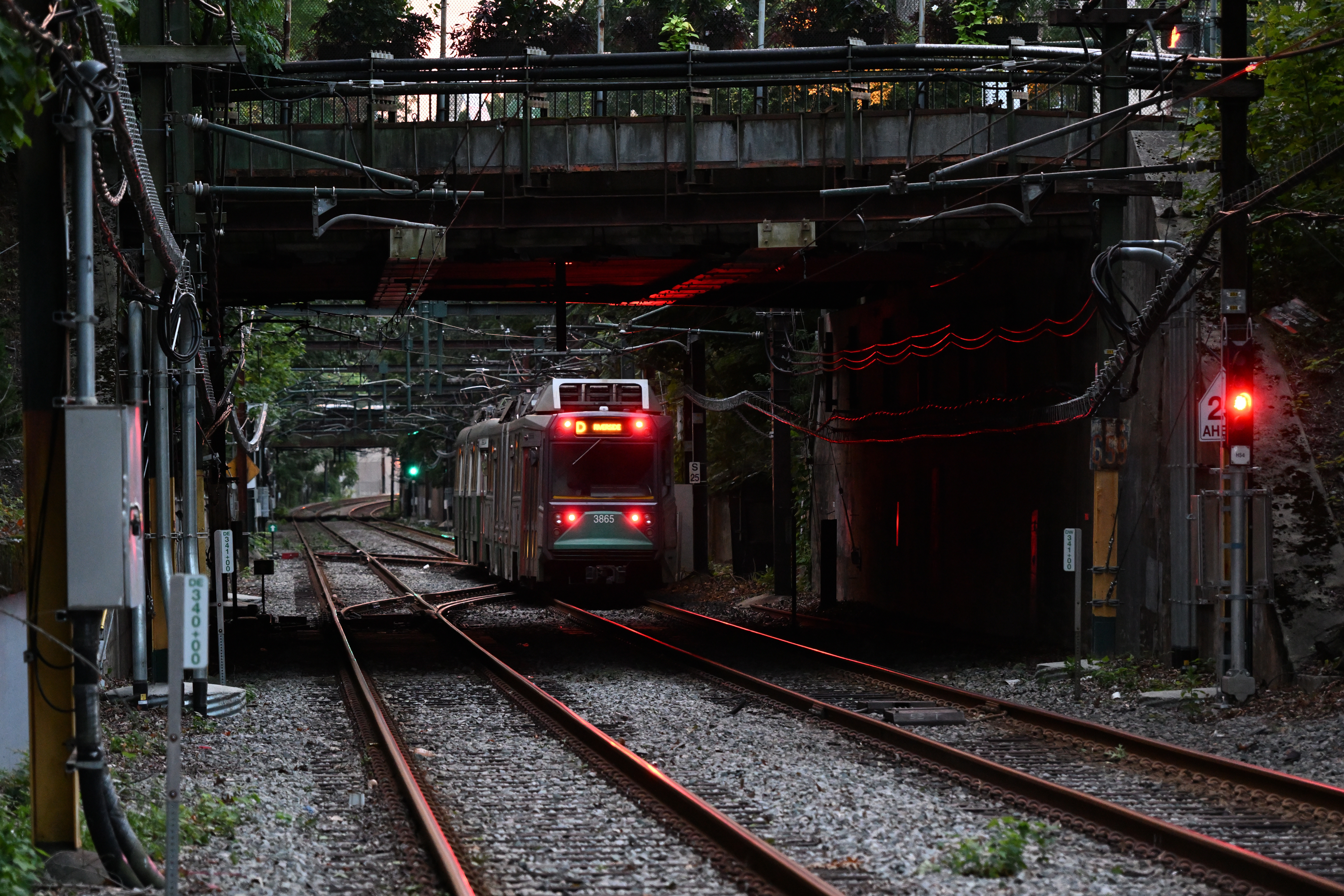
Trains on the D branch operate using wayside signals.

As of February 2023, each of the four branches operate on 7- to 9-minute headways during weekday peak hours, and 8- to 12-minute headways at other times. Vehicle usage ranges from 45 trains (90 cars) to 62 trains (124 cars).

Unlike the MBTA's heavy rail subway lines, the Green Line has only limited central control and monitoring. This also means that it has lagged behind the other three rail lines in the availability of countdown signs and "next train" arrival information. The line is signalled with advisory wayside signals, except on surface portions in street medians or in-street running. Wayside signal territory stretches from Lechmere to the surface portals at Kenmore, and along the entire length of the D–Riverside branch. There are no automatic protection devices, but the cars have track brakes, giving the ability to stop quickly under control of the operator. Interlockings are controlled through a wayside Automatic Vehicle Identification (AVI) system that relies on the operator properly entering the destination manually on a roto-wheel in the train cab at the beginning of a run.

The line is monitored from the Operations Control Center (OCC). Responsibility for controlling service is shared by the control room and field personnel along the right of way. Track circuit and signal indications are not transmitted to the operational personnel sites. In lieu of track circuit indications, the AVI system is displayed in the control room to provide a periodic update to train position wherever AVI detectors exist. The AVI system user interface was solely text based until the current control room was opened, in which a new schematic display based on AVI data was instituted. Track circuit indications are available digitally in signal houses at the Park Street interlocking, at the new North Station interlocking, and at the new Kenmore interlocking, but are not transmitted to OCC. In January 2013, the MBTA announced plans to add full vehicle location tracking on the Green Line for countdown signs and smartphone applications, including using AVI data in the tunnels and GPS receivers on the surface lines. The first real-time data—location data on the surface lines—became available in October 2014. Full tracking was expected by early 2015.

The MBTA typically runs two-car trains at all times. The last scheduled use of one-car trains on weekdays was in March 2007. Three-car trains were added on the B and D branches in 2010 – their first use since 2005 – and a four-car train was tested in April 2011. In March 2011, the number of three-car trains was substantially increased, including use on the E branch. However, three-car trains suffered from reliability problems and slow boarding. The use of three-car trains ended in March 2016.

=== Positive train control ===
The MBTA approved an $82.6 million contract in May 2019 for a train protection system for the Green Line. The system would enforce red signals and automatically stop a train if it approached another train too closely. The project was 28% complete by December 2021; installation of in-vehicle electronics was scheduled to be complete by September 2023, with wayside installation complete in June 2024 and full operation that December. A reallocation of funds in January 2022 shortened the project timeline, with completion expected in 2023. However, in January 2023, an NTSB report found that the project had been delayed to June 2025. The MBTA cancelled the contract in June 2024 citing a lack of progress and an inability by the contractor to complete the project.

The MBTA worked with a different contractor to develop the GLTPS-2 system in two phases. Phase 1, expected to be installed on the existing Type 7, Type 8, and Type 9 fleet by the end of 2025, will be an operator warning system with alarms that trigger when a train is exceeding speed limits or is at risk of imminent collision with another train. Phase 2, which will be installed only on the Type 9 and future Type 10 fleet, adds automatic enforcement by braking and is planned to be finished by June 2028. A $112.5 million contract to install the system was approved in February 2025.

=== Turnarounds ===
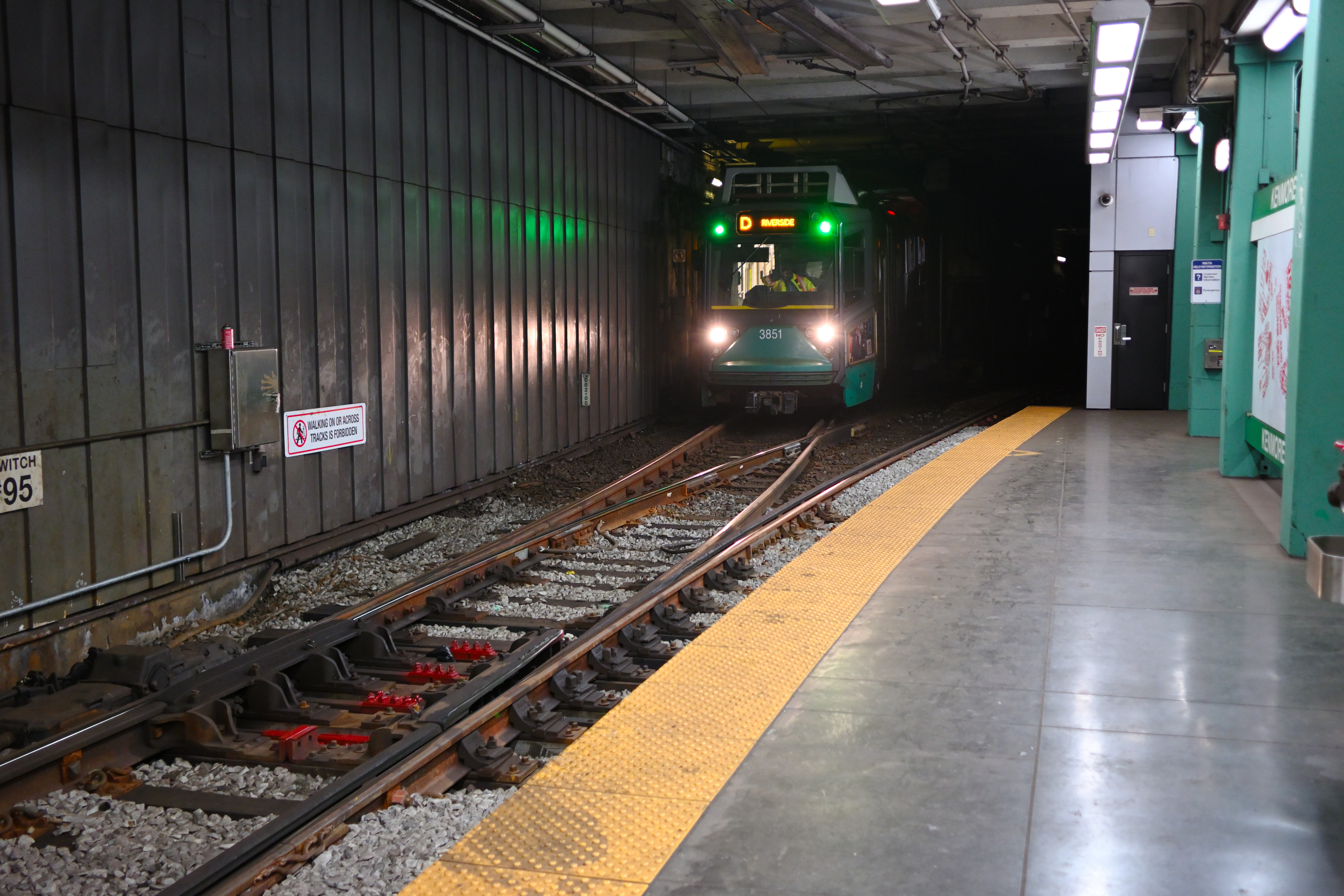
A D branch train on the loop at Kenmore station in 2024

Aside from the terminal stations, several locations have turnaround loops or crossover switches where trains can reverse direction for short turns. One of these, where northbound trains can turn southbound, is regularly used as the downtown terminal for two of the branches:

- At Government Center, a loop under City Hall Plaza. As of 2022, this is the terminal of the B and C branches.

Several other loops and crossovers are not used in regular revenue service but may be used during construction work or service disruptions, or for non-revenue trains, with some having been regularly used as terminals in the past:

- At North Station, a pair of pocket tracks allow reversing.
- At Government Center, the Brattle Loop allows southbound trains to turn northbound, however, this loop is currently only used during service disruptions.
- At Park Street, a loop connects the inner tracks. The MBTA plans to add a crossover to allow through movements from the terminating (inner) northbound platform at Park Street are expected to increase capacity and reliability.
- At Kenmore, a loop allows eastbound (inbound) C and D branch trains to turn westbound.
- On the B branch, a pocket track at Blandford Street allows trains to reverse in either direction. It is sometimes used to reverse westbound trains to provide extra service in the subway. Occasionally-used crossovers are located at Babcock Street, Washington Street, and east of Boston College.
- On the C branch, occasionally-used crossovers are located at St. Mary's Street and Coolidge Corner.
- On the D branch, occasionally-used crossovers are located west of Fenway, Brookline Hills, Beaconsfield, Reservoir, Newton Highlands, and Waban. At Reservoir, the spur tracks to Reservoir Carhouse have platforms for short turn trains.
- On the E branch, crossovers are located at Prudential, Northeastern University, and Brigham Circle, along with a siding at Northeastern. The Brigham Circle crossover is frequently used for short turns during traffic congestion on the street-running section of the line.

=== Location tracking ===
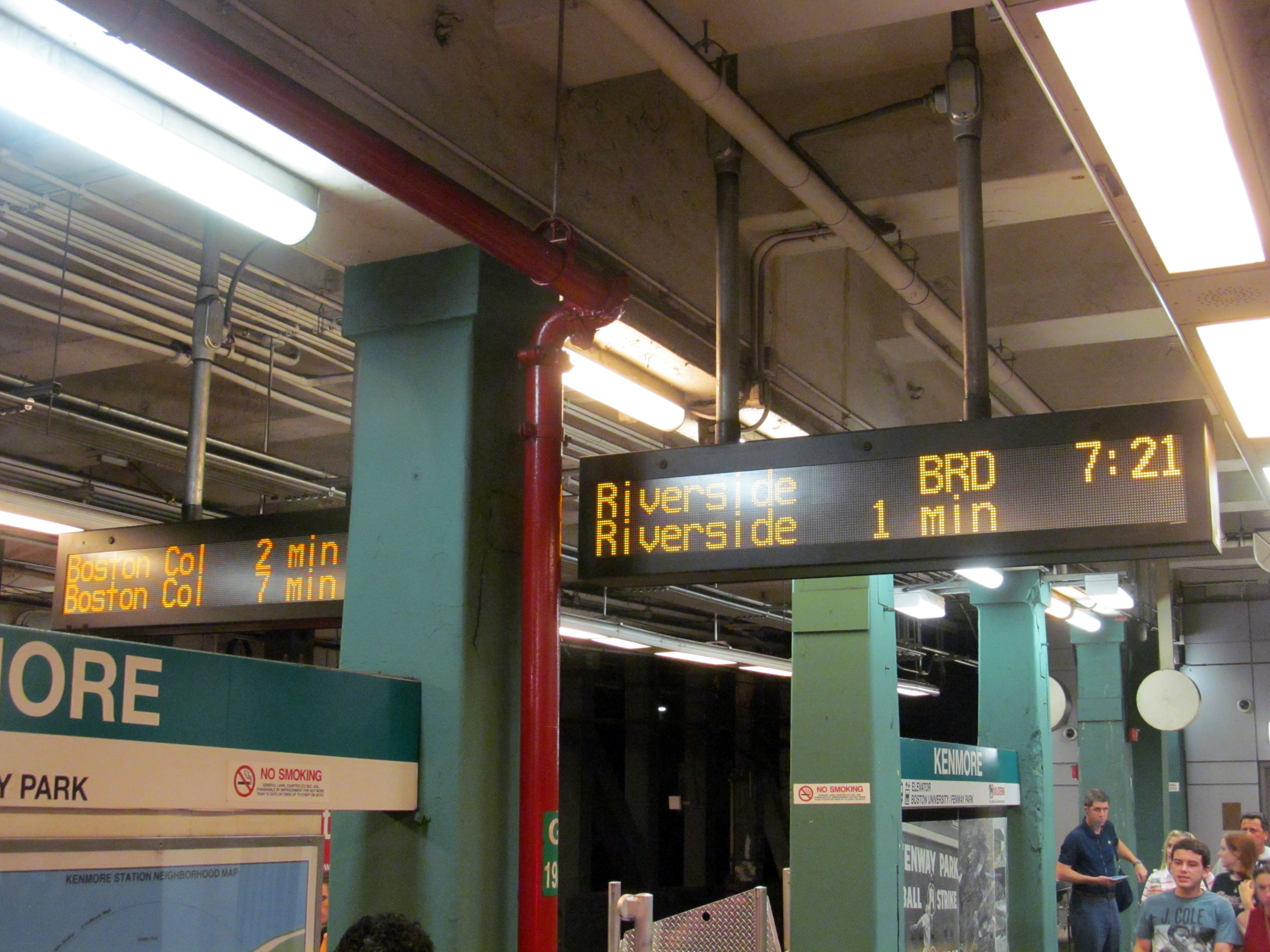
Activated countdown signs at Kenmore station in August 2015

The Red, Orange, and Blue lines have block signalling systems that make tracking the location of trains easier. Signs in most stations along these lines began to display real-time train information in late 2012 and early 2013, while data feeds have been available for smartphone applications since 2010. However, the wayside signalling system used in the Green Line's tunnels and the D branch does not provide for that level of tracking, nor do the basic stop/go signals used on the street-level branch lines. In January 2013, the MBTA announced plans to provide full tracking data for the Green Line by 2015, allowing use of smartphone applications and in-station countdown signs. The $13.4 million system is funded by MassDOT; it uses existing Automatic Vehicle Identification (AVI) systems plus additional sensors in the tunnels, and GPS receivers on the surface sections.

In September 2013, the MBTA announced that "Next Train" signs would be unveiled at Kenmore that month. On October 23, 2014, location tracking data became available for Green Line trains above ground. Arrival predictions for surface stations – including the activation of countdown signs along the D branch – and underground tracking and predictions were to be rolled out in two phases by early 2015. In March 2015, the MBTA announced that enough AVI equipment had been installed to allow the release of some underground data by April. Most underground data was live by August, but trains near Park Street and Boylston waited until September.

The first predictive countdown signs on the Green Line were activated at Newton Centre and Newton Highlands on April 24, 2015, followed shortly by other D branch stations. Countdown signs at Kenmore and Hynes were activated in August 2015. Signs at Copley and Arlington plus eastbound-only signs from Boylston through Science Park were activated in October 2015. The final set of signs – those on the westbound platforms of Science Park through Boylston – were activated in January 2016. Because holding and short-turning trains at the downtown terminals makes time-based predictions unreliable, the signs instead show how many stops away a train is.

== Projects ==
=== Somerville/Medford extension ===
Map of the Green Line Extension. Nearby parts of the Red Line and Orange Line are also shown.

The Green Line Extension (GLX) project added two new branches into the northern suburbs of Somerville and Medford. The project opened in two phases in 2022 at a total cost of $2.28 billion. The rebuilt Lechmere station and the Union Square Branch to Union Square opened on March 21, 2022, as an extension of the D branch (briefly the E branch). The Medford Branch opened to Medford/Tufts on December 12, 2022, as an extension of the E branch, with intermediate stations at East Somerville, Gilman Square, Magoun Square, and Ball Square. The total project cost is estimated to be $2.28 billion: $0.996 billion from the federal government and $1.28 billion from the state. Daily ridership on the extension is projected to be 45,000 by 2030.

The GLX begins at the north end of the Lechmere Viaduct, with a new elevated line continuing north for about 0.6 miles (0.97 km) parallel to the O'Brien Highway. The former surface-level Lechmere station was replaced by an elevated station on the new alignment. The two branches split with an aerial flying junction on the Red Bridge viaduct in the Inner Belt area. The Union Square Branch runs 0.7 miles (1.1 km) west from Red Bridge, sharing the Fitchburg Line right of way. The Medford Branch runs 3.0 miles (4.8 km) northwest from Red Bridge, sharing the Lowell Line right of way. Like the existing D branch, the new branches are fully grade-separated, with no level crossings. A new vehicle storage yard and maintenance facility is located in the Inner Belt area, with leads from both branches at Red Bridge. An extension of the Somerville Community Path runs along the Medford Branch south of Lowell Street, with a high bridge carrying it above the Red Bridge viaduct.

An extension north from Lechmere was first proposed in the 1920s, and again several times during the 20th century. In 1991, the state agreed to build a set of transit projects as part of an agreement with the Conservation Law Foundation (CLF), which had threatened a lawsuit over auto emissions from the Central Artery/Tunnel Project (Big Dig). Among the projects was an extension the Green Line from Lechmere to Medford Hillside through Somerville and Medford, two suburbs underserved by the MBTA relative to their population densities, commercial importance, and proximity to Boston. After delays in planning, the state agreed in 2006 to complete the project by 2014. The preferred alternative from the 2009 Draft Environmental Impact Report added the Union Square Branch; the Medford Branch terminus was set as College Avenue, with a potential future extension to Mystic Valley Parkway.

The planned completion was delayed to 2018 in 2011, and to 2020 in 2014. A groundbreaking ceremony was held in December 2012. The project was expected to cost about $2.2 billion, with half of that paid by the Federal Transit Administration (FTA). However, in 2015 it became clear that the project would cost $3 billion, putting its future in doubt. The project was value engineered to reduce its cost: station designs were simplified, several bridge reconstructions eliminated, the Community Path extension shortened, and the maintenance facility reduced in size. The FTA approved the modified $2.3 billion plan on April 4, 2017. The contract was rebid with a provision for the optional restoration of six of the elements deleted in the 2016 plan. The winning bid, selected in November 2017, included six optional elements, including canopies and additional elevators at stations, public art, a full-size vehicle maintenance facility, and the full extension of the Community Path to East Cambridge. Construction reached 20% completion in November 2019; it was over 50% completed by October 2020, and 80% by June 2021.

=== Accessibility renovations ===
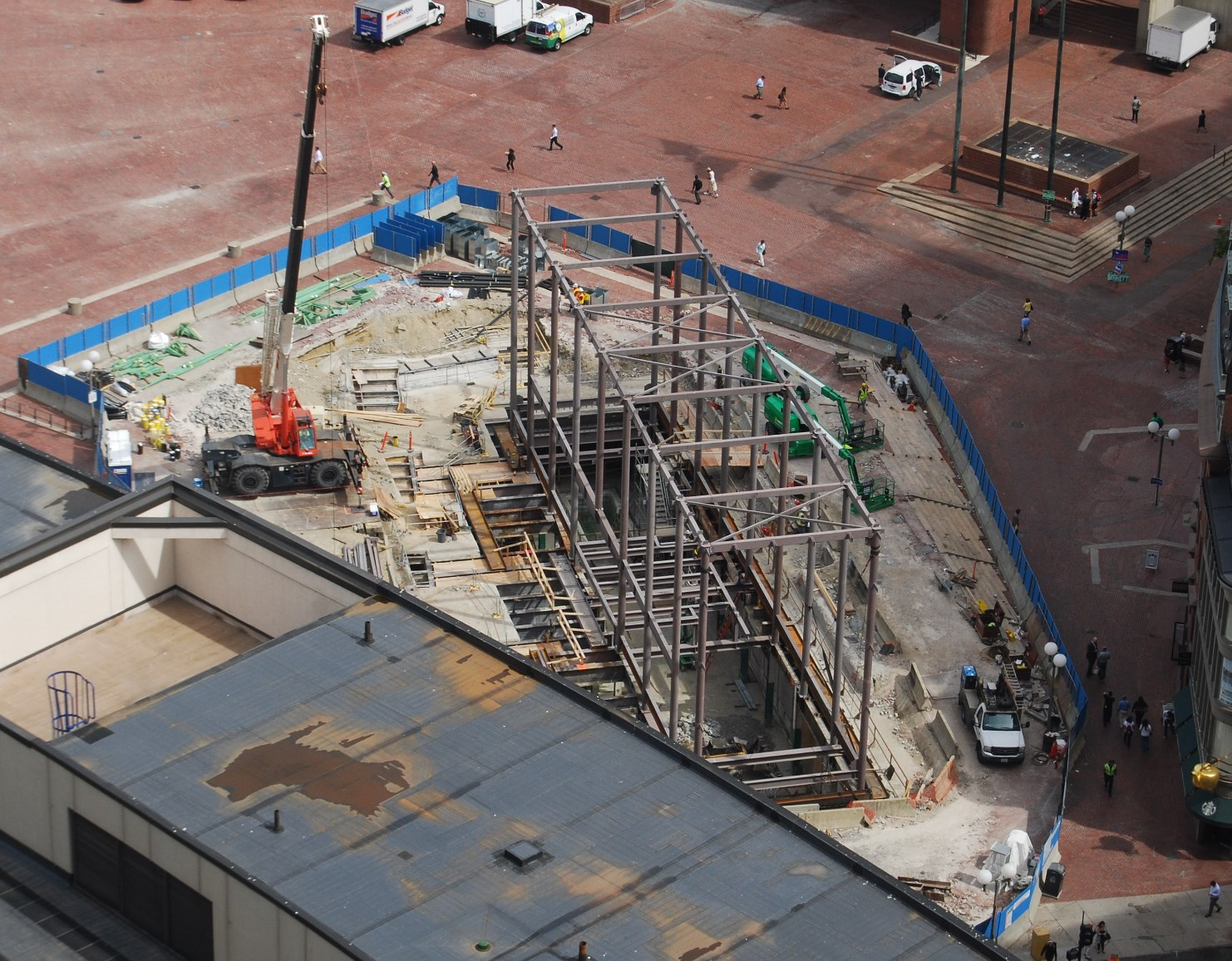
Government Center station under reconstruction in September 2014

The majority of the Green Line opened by 1959, long before the 1990 Americans with Disabilities Act mandated that new construction be fully accessible. The MBTA began modifying Red, Orange, and Blue Line stations for accessibility in the late 1980s; however, Green Line stations were not modified until the late 1990s, when the Type 8 vehicles were under construction. The MBTA began the Light Rail Accessibility Program in 1996. Because modifying the numerous stations all at once would be prohibitively expensive, the MBTA designated "key stations" – largely those with high ridership or bus connections – for prioritization.

Riverside station was completely rebuilt with raised accessible platforms around 1998. North Station and Park Street (both of which already had elevators from previous projects) were outfitted with portable lifts for temporary accessibility around 2000, as were Lechmere and ten surface stations. Between 1999 and 2003, 16 surface stations (4 on the B branch, 4 on the C branch, 3 on the D branch, and 5 on the E branch) were retrofitted with raised platforms. The 13 B, C, and E branch stations collectively cost $32 million. Construction of raised platforms was completed at Park Street and Haymarket around 2003; Prudential was also reconstructed that year by the developer of 111 Huntington Avenue. The fully accessible underground "superstation" at North Station opened in 2004. Wooden mini-high platforms, allowing level boarding on older Type 7 LRVs, were installed at eight Green Line stations in 2006–07 as part of the settlement of Joanne Daniels-Finegold, et al. v. MBTA.

Renovations for accessibility were completed at Arlington in 2009, Kenmore and Copley in 2010, and Science Park in 2011. A two-year closure of Government Center ended in 2016 with the opening of the accessible transfer station. As part of the Green Line Extension, Lechmere was replaced by a fully accessible elevated station in 2022. Symphony station closed effective May 30, 2026, for the first three years of a reconstruction planned to take four years. Hynes Convention Center (with renovations in design) and Boylston are the other remaining inaccessible stations in the Central Subway. As of 2025, the MBTA does not expect to make Boylston accessible by 2030, while Hynes is dependent on funding availability.

Other projects have moved towards full accessibility of the surface branches. Woodland was made accessible in 2006. Renovations completed in 2009 made Longwood accessible and replaced the lifts at Boston College and Brookline Village. A reconstruction of Brookline Hills (replacing lifts) was completed in 2022. Construction of two accessible stations (Babcock Street and Amory Street) on the B branch to replace four non-accessible stations took place in 2021. Temporary work to make Newton Highlands accessible was done in 2019, followed by the four remaining D branch stations in 2024; larger reconstructions of the five stations are planned for later in the 2020s. Several other surface accessibility projects are planned, which will make all surface stations accessible:

- The nine remaining non-accessible B branch stations are to be reconstructed in 2027–2028. Consolidations will reduce the nine stops to six.
- The nine remaining non-accessible C branch stations are to be reconstructed in 2026. Consolidations will reduce the nine stops to seven.
- The four remaining non-accessible E branch stations are to be reconstructed in 2027–2029. Consolidations will reduce the four stops to two.

=== Core Capacity Program ===
In the late 2010s, the MBTA began planning a capital project to meet future capacity needs that year on the Green Line. A study completed in 2018 settled on the size for Type 10 vehicles and evaluated infrastructure needed to support the new vehicles. In 2022, the MBTA entered the project development phase for the Federal Transit Administration Capital Investment Grants Program, which provides funding for "core capacity" projects on crowded sections of existing transit systems. As of April 2025, the MBTA intends to enter the engineering phase by mid-2025, with the full funding grant agreement expected in late 2028 and construction lasting through the mid-2030s. In April 2025, the MBTA Board approved plans for the $3.8 billion Core Capacity Program, of which half ($1.9 billion) would be federally funded. It includes:

- Signal upgrades, new crossovers, and other work in the Central Subway
- Systemwide overhead catenary relocation
- Traction power improvements on the D Branch
- Modifications to the Riverside, Reservoir, Lake Street, and Inner Belt yards
- Accessibility and infrastructure work on the B and E branches
- 58 additional Type 10 vehicles
- A test track between Chestnut Hill and Newton Centre for Type 10 vehicles
- Upgrades to a Type 10 simulator for operators

== Station listing ==
This listing includes only the Green Line section between Lechmere and Kenmore, which are served by multiple branches. For stops served by only one branch, see Green Line B branch § Station listing, Green Line C branch § Station listing, Green Line D branch § Station listing, and Green Line E branch § Station listing. All stations in the central subway have prepaid fare areas (fare control).

Location	Station	Branches	Opened	Notes and connections
East Cambridge	Lechmere	D, E	March 21, 2022	The Lechmere Viaduct opened on June 1, 1912, with a direct connection to surface lines until July 9, 1922. The surface station was open from July 10, 1922, to May 23, 2020. MBTA bus: 69, 80, 87, 88; EZRide
West End	Science Park	D, E	August 20, 1955	
North End	North Station	D, E	June 28, 2004	Original surface station was open from September 3, 1898, to March 27, 1997. Elevated station was open from June 1, 1912, to June 24, 2004. MBTA subway: Orange Line; MBTA Commuter Rail: Fitchburg, Lowell, Haverhill, Newburyport/Rockport; MBTA bus: 4 Amtrak: Downeaster; EZRide; MBTA ferry: F10 (at Lovejoy Wharf); Seaport Ferry (at Lovejoy Wharf)
North End	Haymarket	D, E	September 3, 1898	MBTA subway: Orange Line; MBTA bus: 4, 92, 93, 111, 354, 426, 428, 450
Downtown Boston	Government Center	B, C, D, E	September 3, 1898	MBTA subway: Blue Line; MBTA bus: 354
Downtown Boston	Park Street	B, C, D, E	September 1, 1897	MBTA subway: Red Line, Silver Line (SL5); MBTA bus: 43; At Downtown Crossing: Orange Line; 7, 11, 501, 504, 505
Downtown Boston	Boylston	B, C, D, E	September 1, 1897	MBTA subway: Silver Line (SL5); MBTA bus: 43
Back Bay	Arlington	B, C, D, E	November 13, 1921	MBTA bus: 9, 10, 55, 501, 504
Back Bay	Copley	B, C, D, E	October 3, 1914	MBTA bus: 9, 10, 39, 55, 501, 504
Back Bay	Hynes Convention Center	B, C, D	October 3, 1914	MBTA bus: 1, 55
Fenway–Kenmore	Kenmore	B, C, D	October 23, 1932	MBTA bus: 8, 19, 57, 60; At Lansdowne: Framingham/Worcester Line

== Incidents and collisions ==
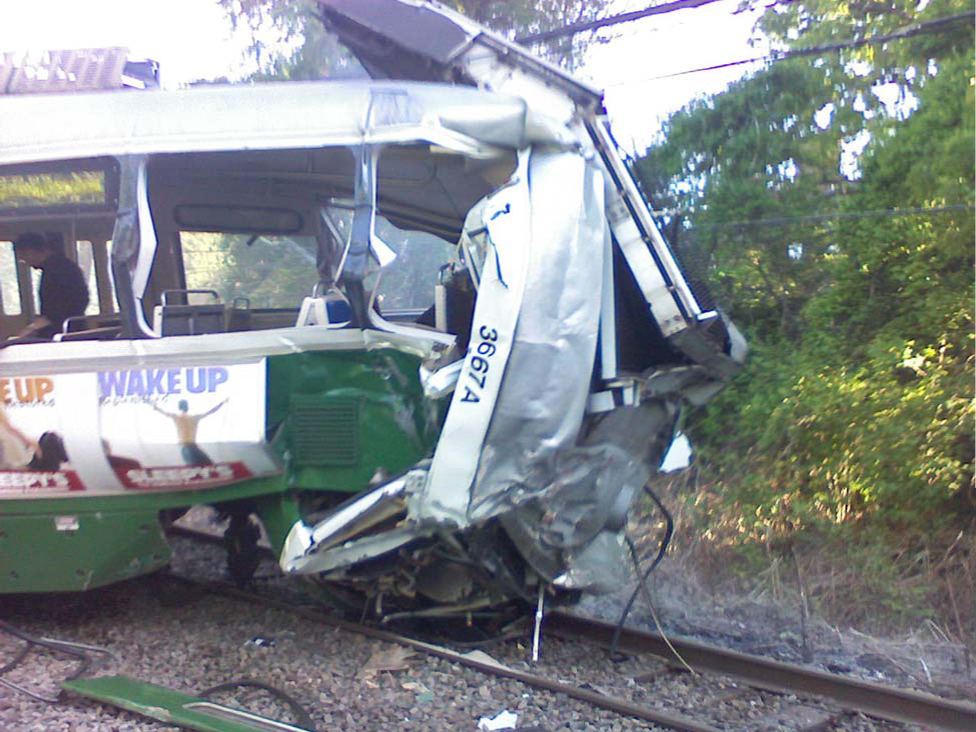
Type 7 LRV car wrecked in the May 2008 crash

On May 28, 2008, two D branch trains collided in Newton. The operator of one of the trains was killed and numerous riders were taken to area hospitals with injuries of varying degrees of seriousness. While it was originally thought that cell phone use was responsible for the crash, the cause was officially determined to be an episode of micro-sleep caused by the driver's sleep apnea.

On May 8, 2009, two trolleys rear-end collided underground between Park Street and Government Center when the driver of one of the trolleys, 24-year-old Aiden Quinn, was text messaging his girlfriend while driving. Quinn had run through a red light before the crash, which injured 46 people. MBTA officials estimated that the cost of the crash was $9.6 million. A strict ban on cell phone usage by MBTA operators was later enacted.

On October 8, 2012, two E branch trolleys collided in the 700 block of Huntington Avenue near Brigham Circle when one derailed into the other, injuring three people including a train operator. The next month on November 29, two trolleys collided at low speed at Boylston, injuring several dozen passengers.

On March 10, 2014, a D branch trolley with passengers aboard derailed in the tunnel just west of Kenmore Station, near the flat junction between the "D" and "C" branches. A second train had to brake suddenly to avoid hitting the derailed train. Ten people were treated for moderate injuries.

In October 2016, The Boston Globe reported that the Green Line had the highest number of derailments and collisions on light rail lines in the United States in 2015. The number of incidents had been increasing for several years due to deferred maintenance on tracks and wheels, which resulted in more low-speed derailments of Type 8 cars.

On July 30, 2021, two B branch trains collided at Babcock Street, causing 25 injuries.

On October 1, 2024, a train derailed near Lechmere, injuring seven people and disrupting service on the Green Line Extension. Regular service resumed on October 3. The National Transportation Safety Board, Federal Transit Administration, and Massachusetts Department of Public Utilities are investigating the derailment. A preliminary NTSB report noted the train was going 36 mph (58 km/h) in a 10 mph (16 km/h) zone and passed through a double red signal that required a stop. The train passed through a switch that was still moving into position, causing part of the first truck of the lead car to go straight and the rest of the train into the diverging track and causing the derailment.

On February 9, 2025, a E branch train crashed into an out of service train at East Somerville, injuring five people.

In 2009, the National Transportation Safety Board recommended that the Green Line be outfitted with positive train control to prevent collisions as part of its various crash investigations. The MBTA decided in 2012 not to implement PTC, estimating the cost at $645 million to $721 million. In 2015, as crashes continued to happen, the NTSB complained the agency was moving too slowly identifying a feasible alternative. In 2019, the MBTA awarded a contract to implement a similar safety system by 2024, at a cost of $170 million. A train would automatically brake if a driver violated a traffic signal, or if cameras or radar detected an obstacle. That contract was cancelled in June 2024. A new contract was awarded in February 2025 for a new system that would provide warnings to operators by the end of 2025, and enforce violations with automatically braking by mid-2028.

The Type 7 cars have been noted for poor crashworthiness by the NTSB and Massachusetts Department of Public Utilities (DPU), with several cases of serious structural damage and loss of survivable space (especially to the operator's cab) when hit by another train. After the February 2025 crash where a Type 8 rear ended a Type 7, causing major structural damage to the Type 7 (and comparatively minimal damage to the Type 8), the MBTA was ordered by the DPU to consider corrective measures, such as limiting the maximum allowable speed of Type 7 trains and only using Type 8s as leaders.
