= Copley station =

MBTA subway station in Boston, Massachusetts

Copley
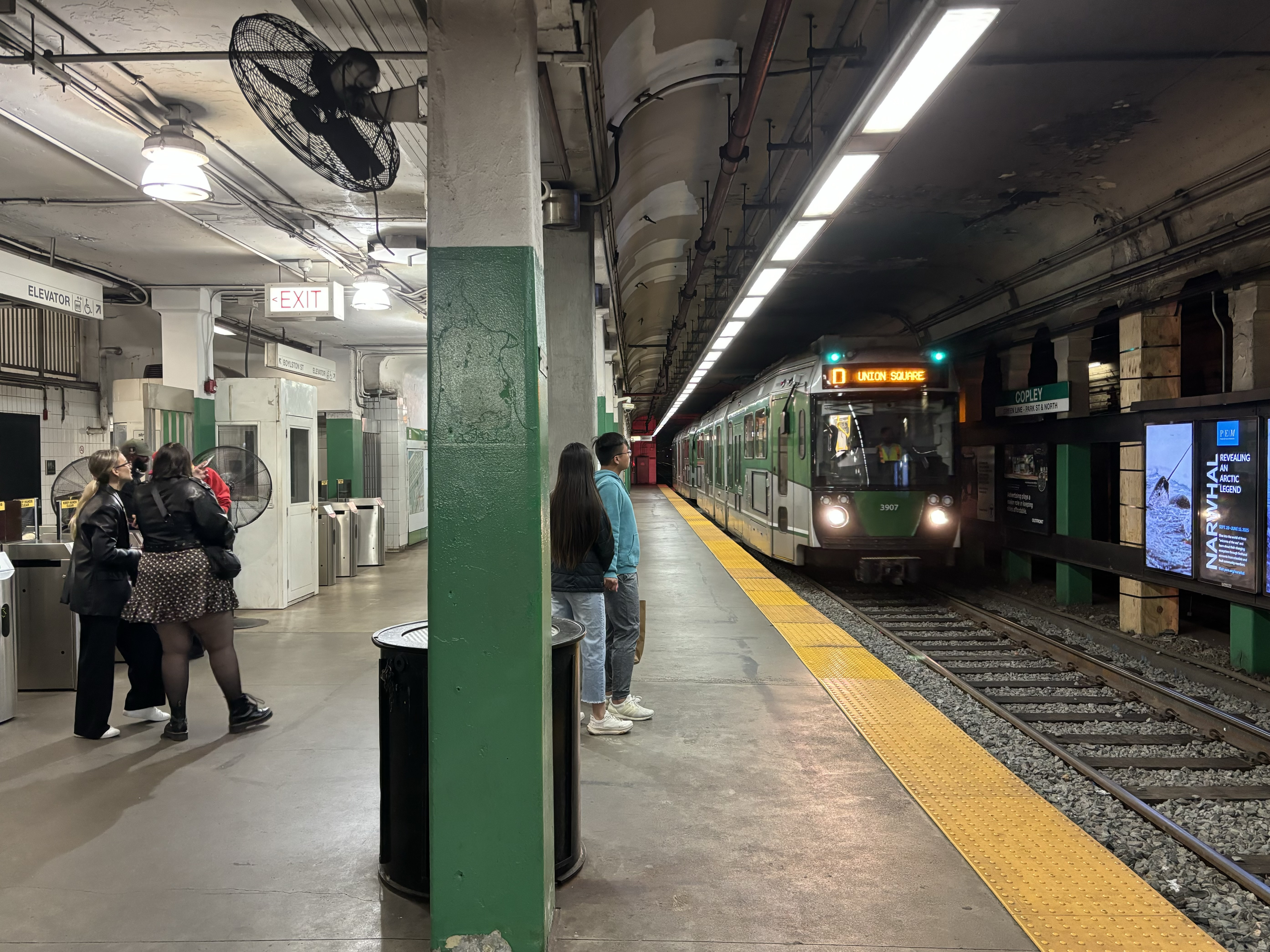
- An inbound train at Copley station in September 2024

General information
- Location: 640 Boylston Street at Copley Square; Boston, Massachusetts
- Coordinates: 42.3500°N 71.0777°W
- Line: Boylston Street subway
- Platforms: 2 side platforms
- Tracks: 2
- Connections: MBTA bus: 9, 10, 39, 55, 501, 504

Construction
- Structure type: Underground
- Accessible: Yes

History
- Opened: October 3, 1914
- Rebuilt: 2008–2011

Passengers
- FY2019: 12,244 daily boardings

Services
Preceding station	MBTA	Following station
Hynes Convention Center toward Boston College	Green Line B branch	Arlington toward Government Center
Hynes Convention Center toward Cleveland Circle	Green Line C branch	Arlington toward Government Center
Hynes Convention Center toward Riverside	Green Line D branch	Arlington toward Union Square
Prudential toward Heath Street	Green Line E branch	Arlington toward Medford/Tufts
Former services
Preceding station	MBTA	Following station
Hynes Convention Center toward Watertown	Green Line A branch	Arlington toward Park Street
Location

Copley station is an underground light rail station on the MBTA Green Line, located in the Back Bay section of Boston, Massachusetts. Located in and named after Copley Square, the station has entrances and exits along Boylston Street and Dartmouth Street.

Copley station opened in 1914 as part of the Boylston Street subway. The station is accessible following extensive station renovation completed in 2011. The renovation project was subject to a significant court case regarding the project's effects on the Old South Church.

== Station layout ==
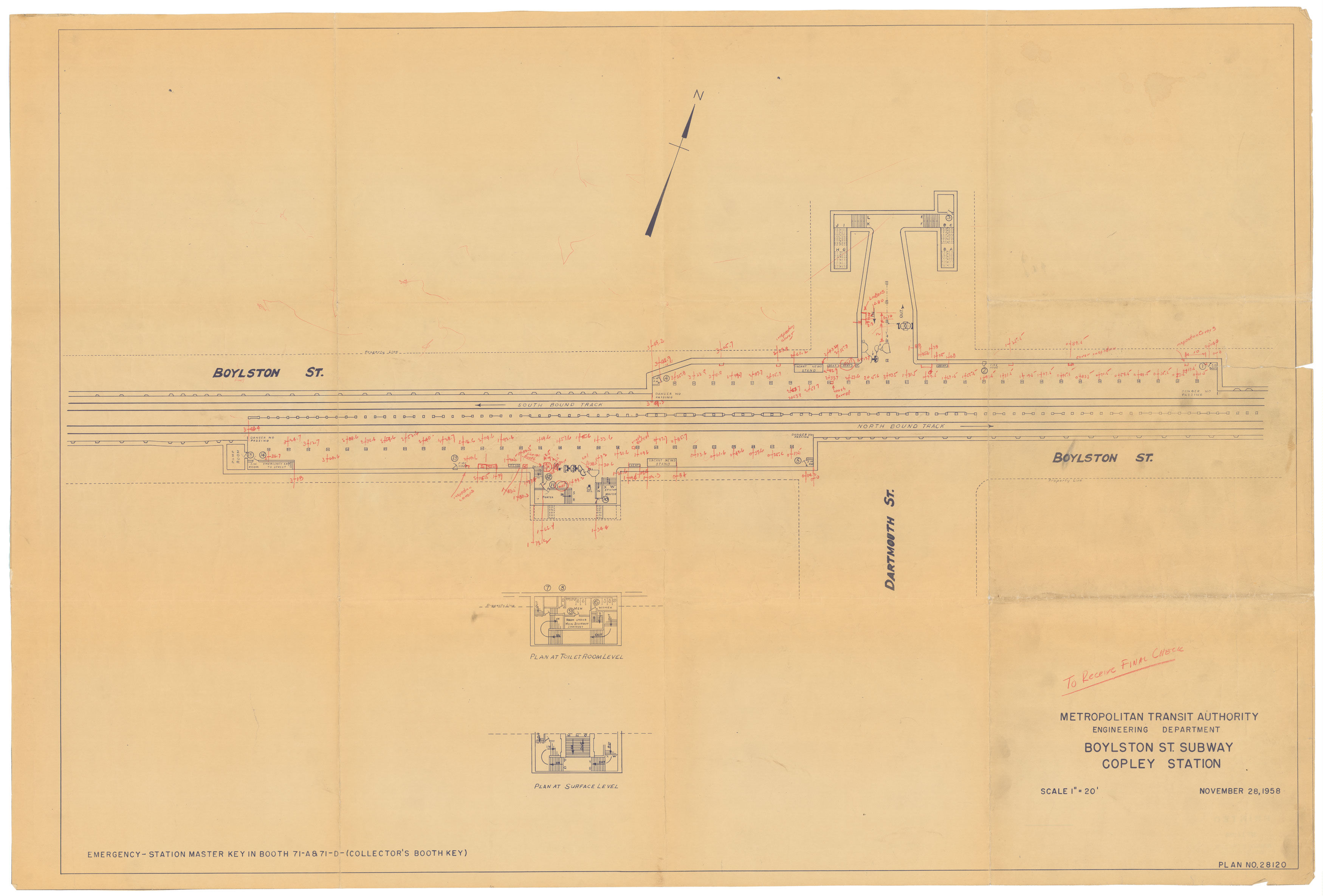
November 1958-drafted plan of Copley station showing the offset platforms

Copley station has two side platforms. The platforms are offset, with the outbound platform further east to avoid the Old South Church. Due to the offset platforms, there is no direct connection between the inbound and outbound platforms; passengers must exit the station and cross Boylston Street or travel one stop further inbound to Arlington station to change directions. Some stations constructed during the Boston Elevated Railway era had cross passages above or below the tracks to allow passengers to transfer between the inbound and outbound platforms; others had such passages constructed later. Even after the Huntington Avenue subway opened in 1941 and Copley became a transfer station, no passage was built. Copley station remains one of the few in the MBTA system that do not have a crossover between outbound and inbound platforms.

Just west of the inbound side of Copley station, the Green Line E branch splits off to the southwest from the main line via a flat junction, and then runs under Huntington Avenue towards its terminus at Heath Street.

Six MBTA bus routes – 9, 10, 39, 55, 501, and 504 – use a westbound stop at St. James Avenue at the southwest corner of Copley Square. Intercity bus routes run by Cavalier Coach, Peter Pan Bus, and Yankee Bus also use that stop. Routes 9, 39, and 55 also use an eastbound stop on Boylston Street adjacent to the inbound headhouse. Back Bay station, located three blocks south of Copley station on Dartmouth Street, is served by the Orange Line subway, four MBTA Commuter Rail lines, and three Amtrak services.

== History ==
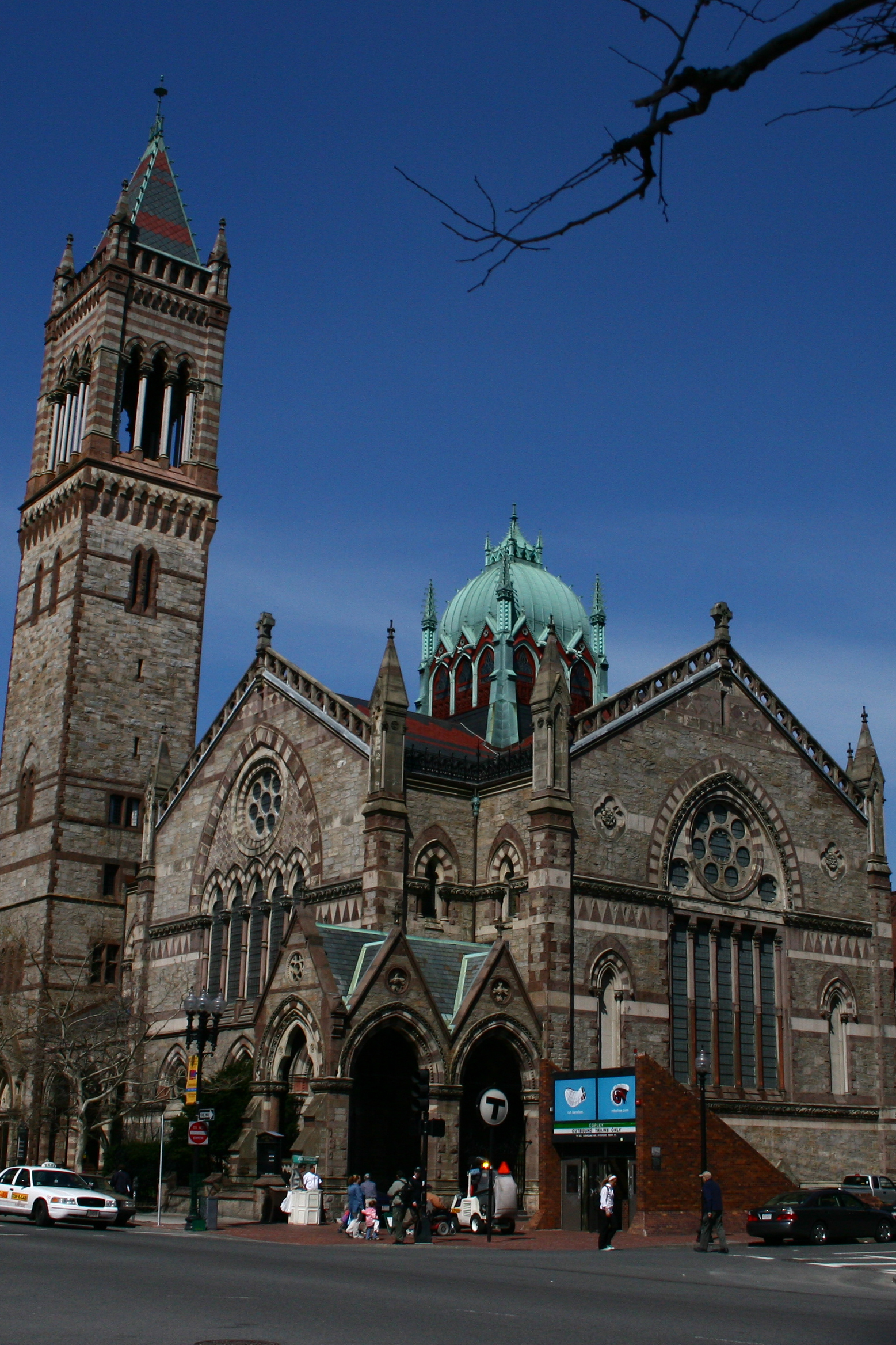
Old South Church and the old outbound headhouse in 2005

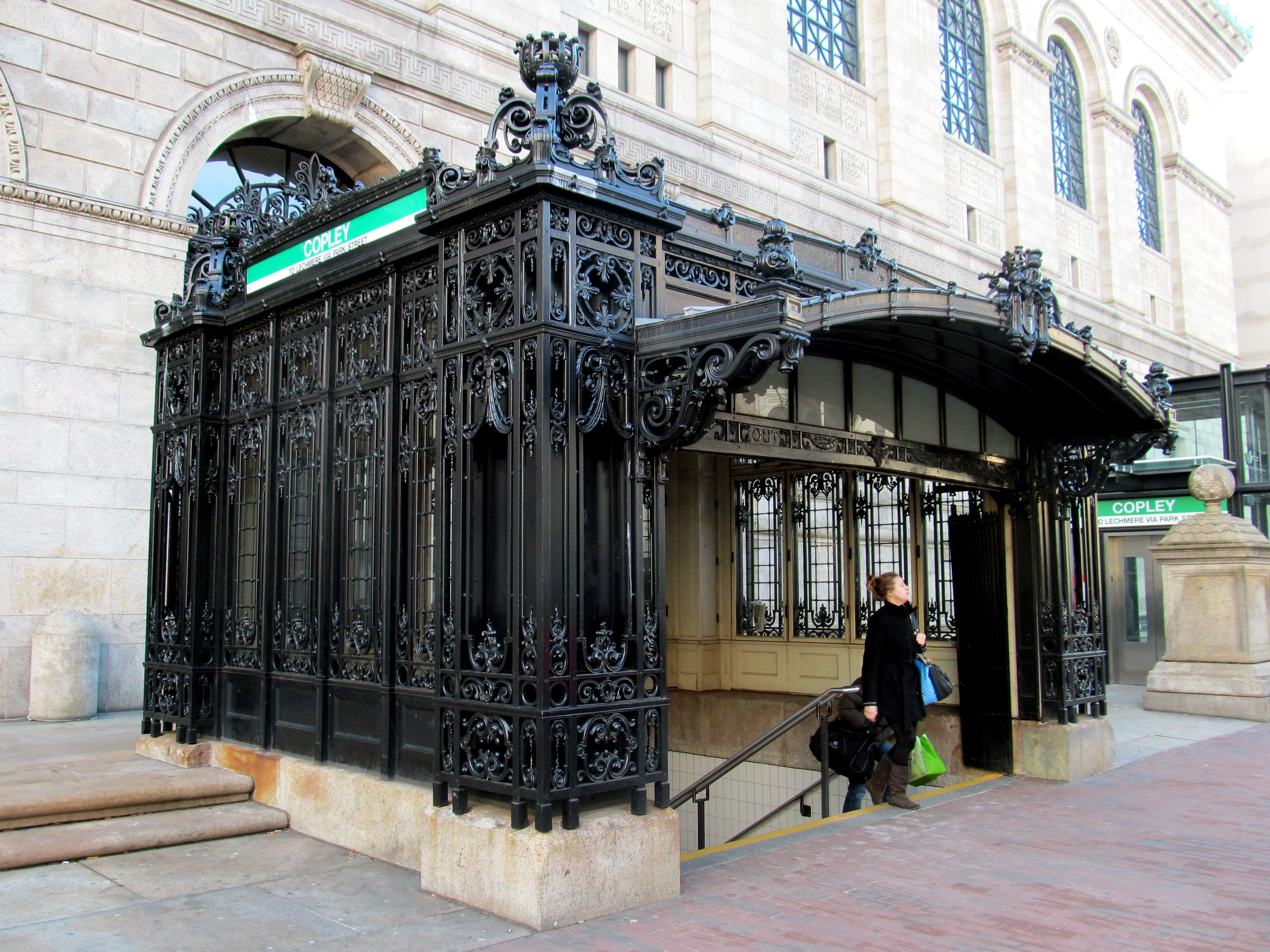
The ornate inbound headhouse next to the McKim Building

In 1907, the General Court authorized the construction of the Boylston Street subway as part of an extension of the original Tremont Street subway. Copley station opened October 3, 1914, as part of the project. The ornate wrought-iron head house next to the Boston Public Library was designed by the firm Fox, Jenny & Gale. Originally Copley had light blue and white tile mosaic for the station name on the walls; however, none of these have survived.

Copley station is closed every year on the day of the Boston Marathon. After the Boston Marathon bombing, the station remained closed through April 23, 2013.

Track realignment at Arlington and Copley, which will deal with Green Line vehicle doors becoming stuck on the platforms, is expected to take place in the mid-2020s.

=== Renovation project and lawsuit ===
As a "key station" on the MBTA system, Copley was a priority for the MBTA to make handicapped accessible under the Light Rail Accessibility Program. A 1995 MBTA report identified possible elevator locations for the station, noting potential conflicts with the historic Old South Church and the Boston Public Library McKim Building, both of which are National Historic Landmarks. The MBTA finished design plans in 2002; representatives from the church and the library approved the plans. These plans placed the outbound elevator next to the church, and the inbound elevator next to the library steps.

In August 2003, the Neighborhood Association of the Back Bay (NABB) asked the MBTA to move the outbound elevator across the street from the church, and the inbound elevator 150 feet (46 m) away from the library steps. In response, an MBTA preservation consultant prepared a report analyzing the impacts of the proposal. Based on this, the Federal Transit Administration issued a decision of "no adverse effect", with which the Massachusetts Historical Commission concurred in January 2004. In May 2004, the Department of the Interior concurred with the FTA's statement that "there is no prudent and feasible alternative to the proposed project and that all possible measures to minimize harm have been included in the project planning." On December 30, 2004, the FTA issued a Finding Of No Significant Impact (FONSI), concluding that alternate elevator locations were infeasible to construct or violated the Americans with Disabilities Act of 1990 by forcing handicapped riders onto a longer entrance route.

In June 2005, NABB and the Boston Preservation Alliance (BPA) filed suit against the MBTA and FTA, alleging that the agencies had violated the National Historic Preservation Act and the Department of Transportation Act of 1966. On December 28, 2005, a district court rejected the NABB and BPA's arguments, finding that the FTA had properly determined that the project would have "no adverse effect" and that the public interest would be served by the speedy renovation of the station. On September 14, 2006, the United States Court of Appeals for the First Circuit led by Michael Boudin confirmed the district court's decision.

The MBTA began the renovations – which included the two elevators, new outbound headhouses, new tiling and lighting, accessible platforms, and restoration of the wrought iron inbound headhouse – in 2008. In December 2008, the $45 million construction project (part of a $61 million billing that included similar modifications to Arlington station) was halted when it was found that drilling for the outbound elevator had caused a crack in the church's exterior wall as well as damage to the sanctuary. Construction resumed in December 2009, with the permission of church leaders, after automated monitoring systems were installed. The inbound headhouse, which had been disassembled and restored around a new structural steel frame, was returned in August 2010. The renovations were completed on October 29, 2010. Repairs to the church, paid for by the MBTA contractor's insurance, took place in 2011.
