= Arlington station (MBTA) =

Light rail subway station in Boston, Massachusetts, US

Arlington
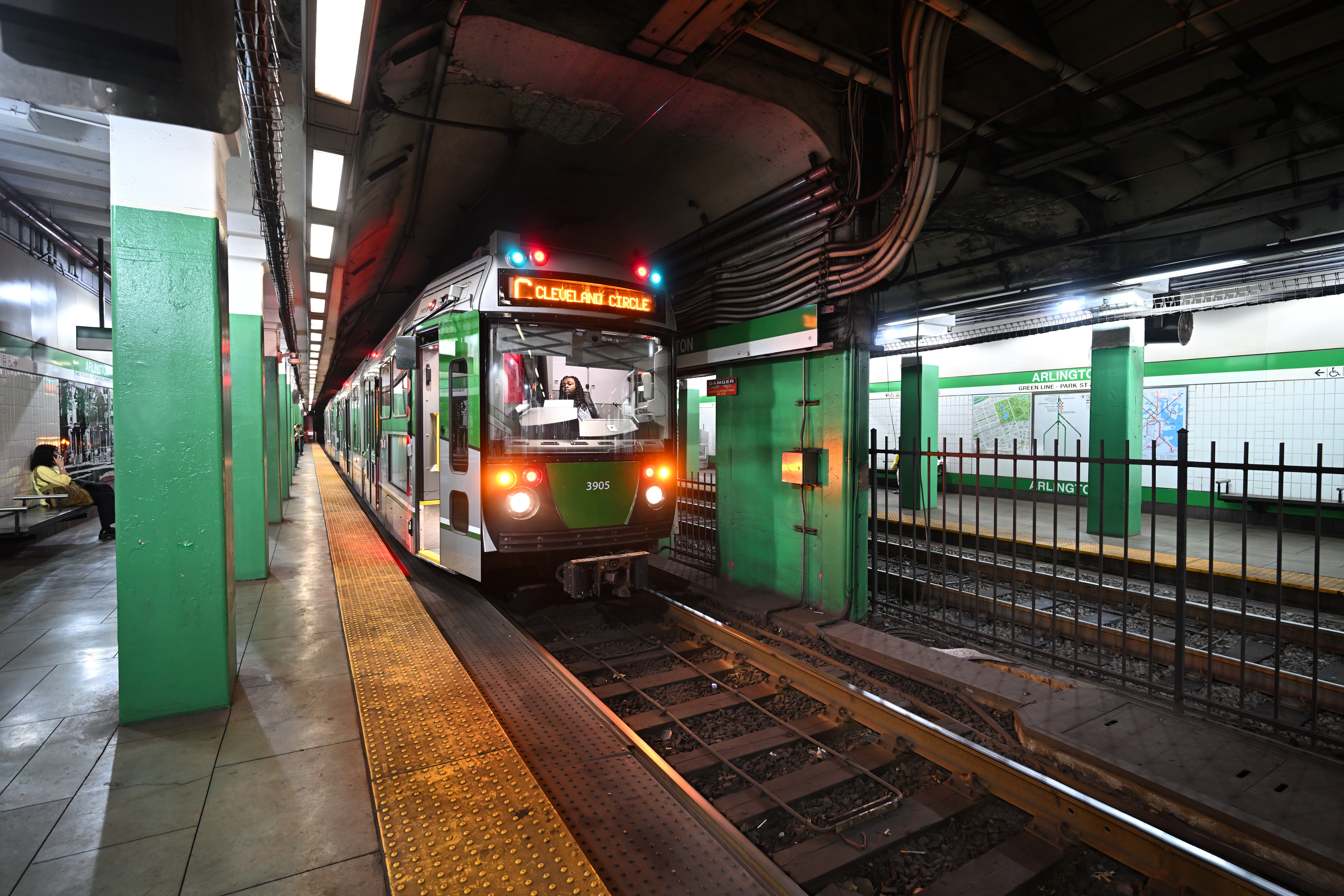
- An outbound train at Arlington station in April 2025

General information
- Location: 20 Arlington Street; Boston, Massachusetts
- Coordinates: 42.3518°N 71.0711°W
- Line: Boylston Street subway
- Platforms: 2 side platforms
- Tracks: 2
- Connections: MBTA bus: 9, 10, 55, 501, 504

Construction
- Structure type: Underground
- Accessible: Yes

History
- Opened: November 13, 1921
- Rebuilt: November 22, 2006–May 31, 2009

Passengers
- FY2019: 6,813 daily boardings

Services
Preceding station	MBTA	Following station
Copley toward Boston College	Green Line B branch	Boylston toward Government Center
Copley toward Cleveland Circle	Green Line C branch	Boylston toward Government Center
Copley toward Riverside	Green Line D branch	Boylston toward Union Square
Copley toward Heath Street	Green Line E branch	Boylston toward Medford/Tufts
Former services
Preceding station	MBTA	Following station
Copley toward Watertown	Green Line A branch Discontinued 1969	Boylston toward Park Street
Location

Arlington station is an underground light rail station on the Massachusetts Bay Transportation Authority (MBTA) Green Line located at the southwest corner of the Boston Public Garden at the corner of Arlington and Boylston Streets at the east end of the Back Bay neighborhood of Boston, Massachusetts. Arlington station was not included in the original construction of the Boylston Street subway, which opened in 1914. Its construction was delayed by World War I, and the station ultimately opened in 1921.

== Station layout ==
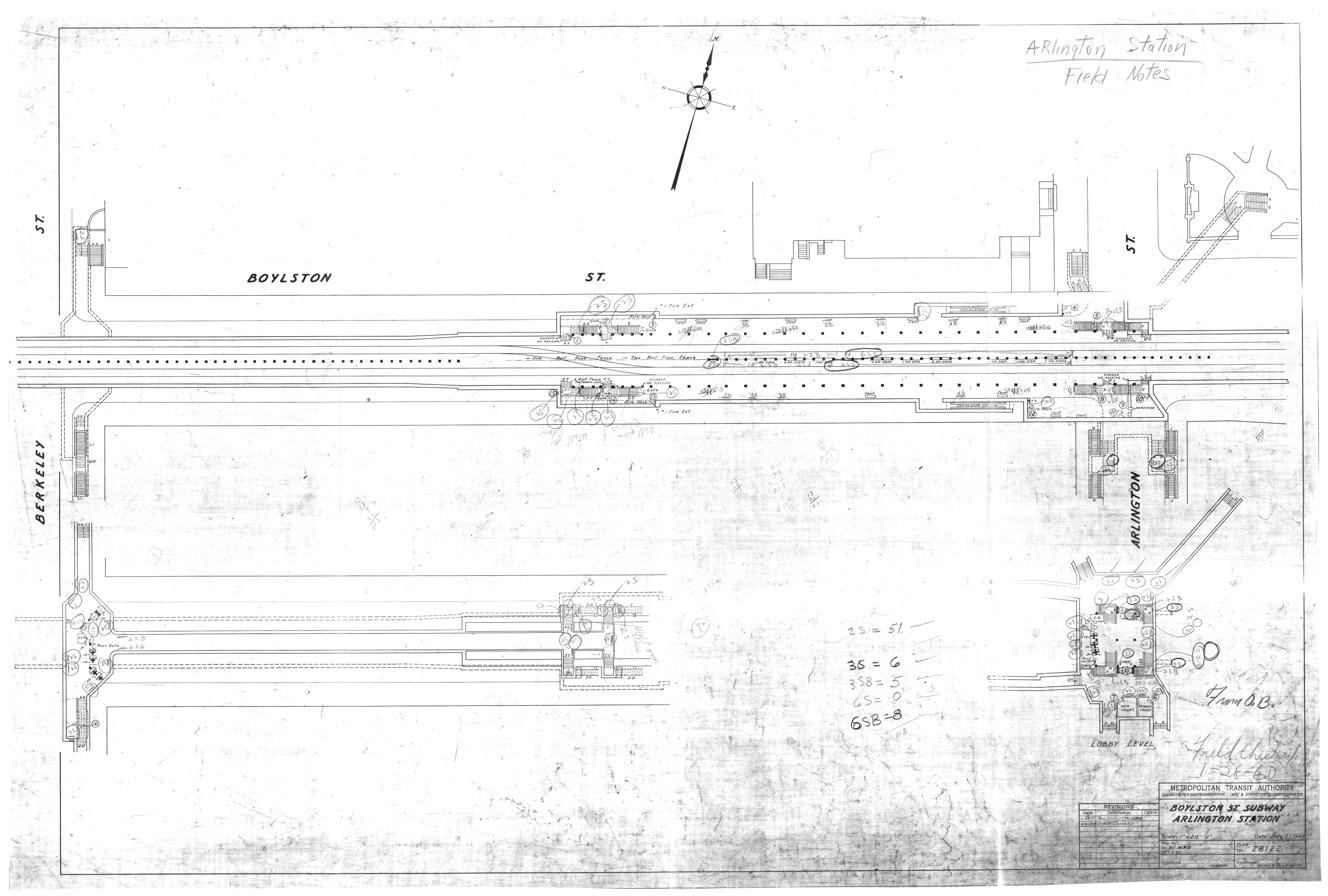
A 1949 plan of the station

Arlington station has two side platforms serving the two tracks of the Boylston Street subway, located under the east half of the block of Boylston Street between Arlington Street and Berkeley Street. A fare mezzanine is located under the intersection of Arlington Street and Boylston Street. The mezzanine is connected to the platforms with stairs, elevators, and exit-only escalators. Five stairway entrances are located around the mezzanine; another stairway and the surface elevator are located further west on the north side of Boylston Street, connected to the mezzanine by a passageway. A closed passageway formerly led to an entrance from the Public Garden. A smaller fare mezzanine is located at Berkeley Street and connected to the platforms with a long corridor. This entrance does not have elevators for accessibility and is not open in normal use.

== History ==
=== Construction ===
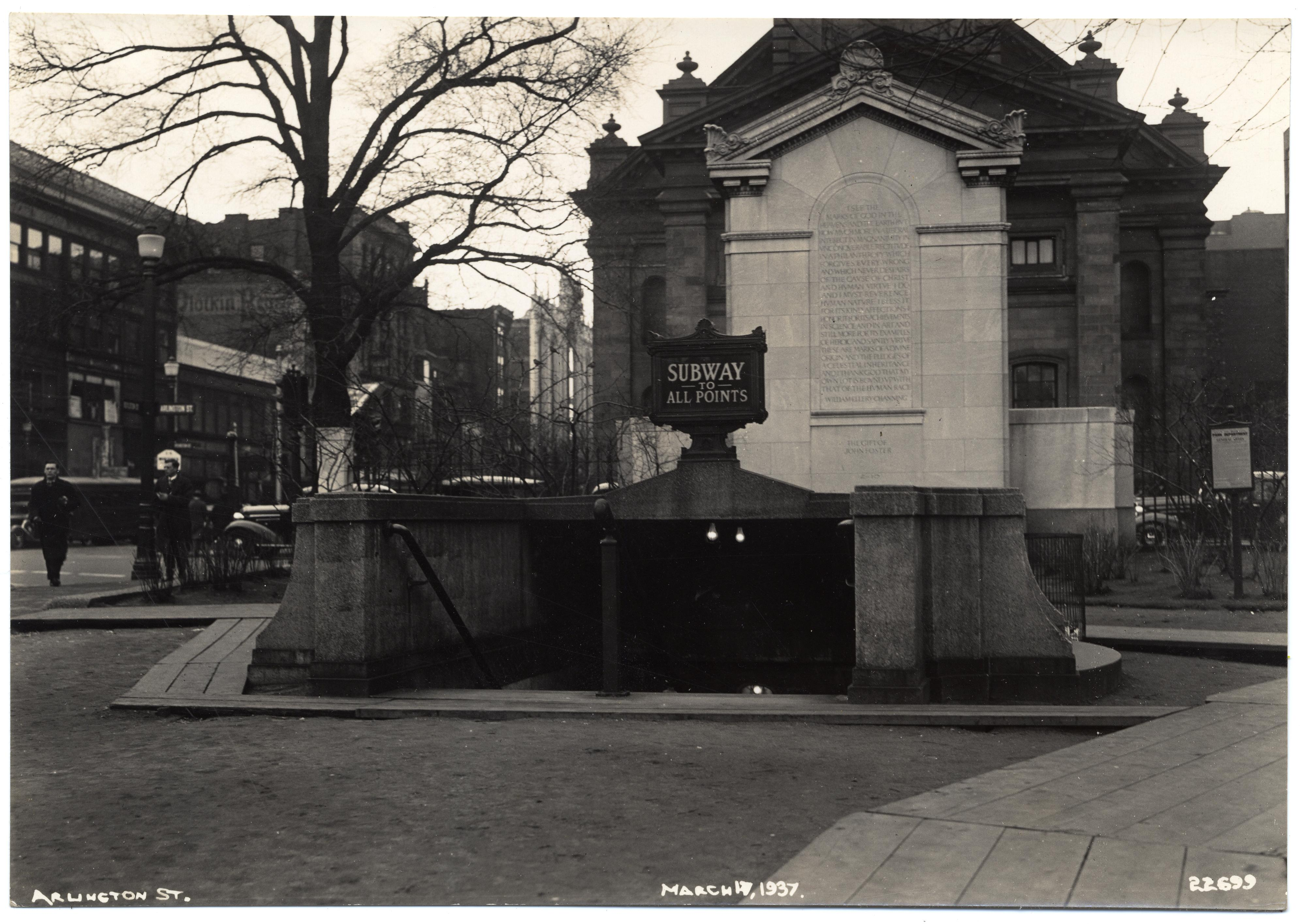
The now-closed Public Garden entrance, 1937

After the success of the original Tremont Street subway in 1897–1898, there was a push to extend the tunnel under Boylston Street towards Kenmore Square. During 1913 tunnel excavations near the present-day site of Arlington station, remains of ancient fish weirs built by Native Americans were found approximately 30 feet (9.1 m) below street level. Their age has been estimated as between 2,000 and 3,600 years.

Businesses in the Back Bay neighborhood along Boylston Street between Clarendon and Tremont Streets became worried about loss of income due to being bypassed by an uninterrupted 4,000-foot (1,200 m) tunnel between Boylston and Copley stations, which was completed in 1914. They lobbied for an infill station near Arlington Street, but were rebuffed by the Boston Elevated Railway and the state legislature. In 1915, with the backing of Boston mayor James Michael Curley, they succeeded in getting legislative approval for a new underground station.

After delays caused by World War I, Arlington station finally opened in 1921. Escalators from the platforms to the lobby were added in 1951 – the westbound on June 11, the eastbound on November 7. With the platforms 55 steps below ground, Arlington had been the deepest station on the system without escalators.

=== 1960s renovations ===
The MBTA wanted to improve its graphic design in the early 1960s, so they hired Cambridge Seven Associates graphic designers to make it easier for people to understand. Arlington was used as their pilot project for testing modernization ideas, including the (T) "lollipop" sign, the colored walls and signage distinction between "inbound" vs "outbound", the high-contrast photographs on the walls, and the colored bands along the wall and above the entrances. At the platform level, the wall at the inbound end of the station was painted with "warm" colors red and orange, while the outbound end was painted with "cool" colors blue and green. A dedication ceremony was held on August 17, 1967, with the renovation fully completed in 1968.

The Berkeley Street entrance was closed on January 3, 1981, as part of extensive cutbacks that included closing Bowdoin and Symphony stations. Those stations later reopened, but the Berkeley Street entrance did not. A secondary name of Park Plaza, used on some station signage, was added in 1985 as part of a series of station name changes.

=== Later renovations ===
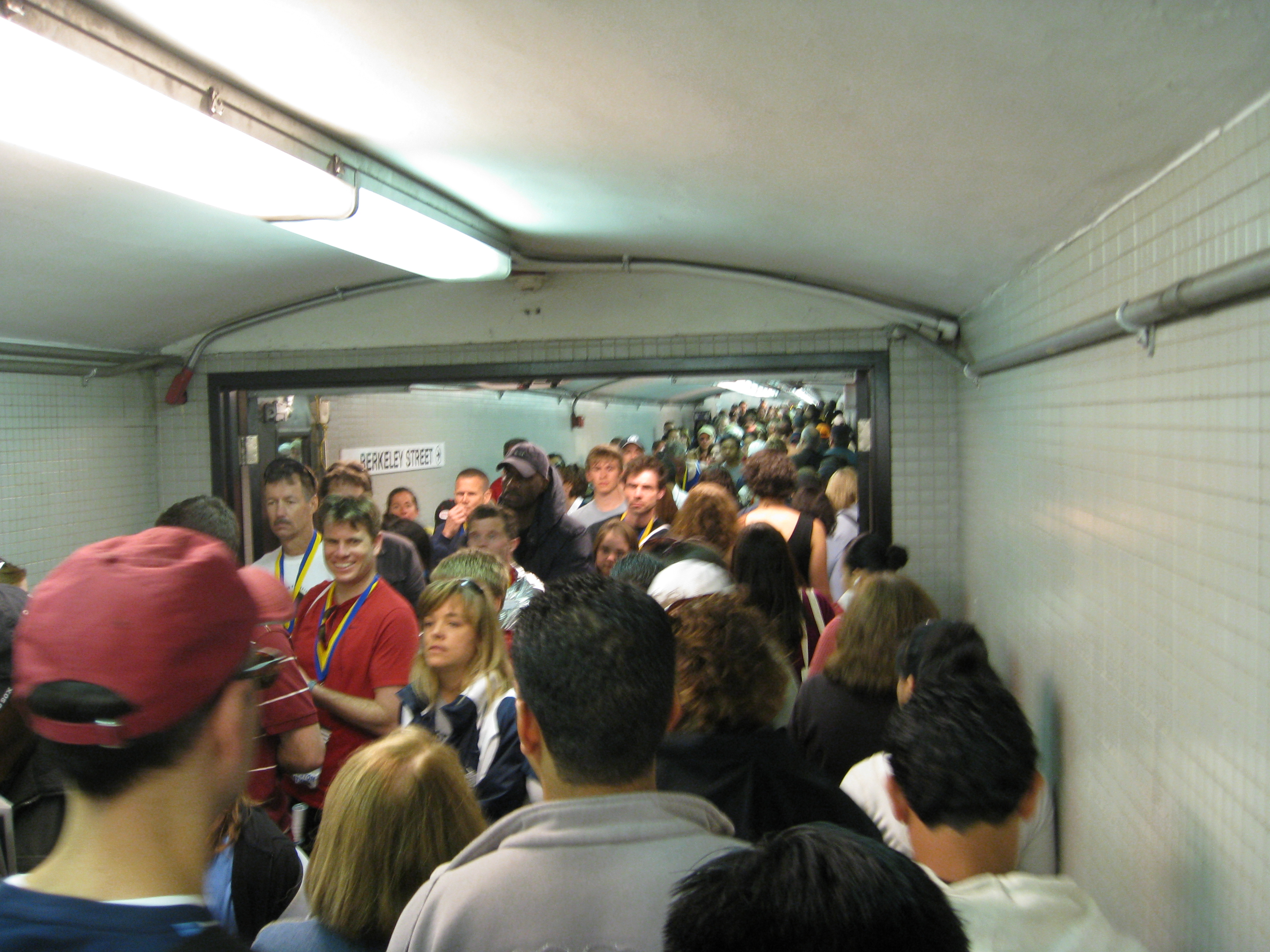
Boston Marathon crowds in the Berkeley Street passageway during renovations

On November 22, 2006, the MBTA closed the Arlington Street entrance to the station to begin a major renovation of the station. Conducted in concert with similar changes to Copley, the project added elevators and raised platforms to make the station accessible. The street elevator was placed in front of the Arlington Street Church along with a new set of stairs, and the northwest entrance was relocated. The 1981-closed Berkeley Street entrance was reopened for the duration of the project.

On May 31, 2009, the renovated main entrances on Arlington Street reopened for public use, and the Berkeley Street entrances were reverted to emergency-only exits. Panels of artwork were added to the station at the platform level. Designed by Ross Miller, these panels explain and celebrate the ancient Boylston Street Fishweir that had been discovered during excavations in the vicinity.

The MBTA plans to add three elevators to the Berkeley Street lobby and reopen it as a full entrance. A $10.5 million design contract for Arlington, North Station, and Sullivan Square was awarded in April 2020. Design work for Arlington was completed in late 2023. Track realignment at Arlington and Copley, which will deal with Green Line vehicle doors becoming stuck on the platforms, is expected to take place in the mid-2020s. The entrances on the southwest corner of the Arlington/Boylston intersection were temporarily closed beginning in June 2024 during redevelopment of the adjacent building.
