= Boylston Street subway =

Light rail tunnel in Boston, Massachusetts, US

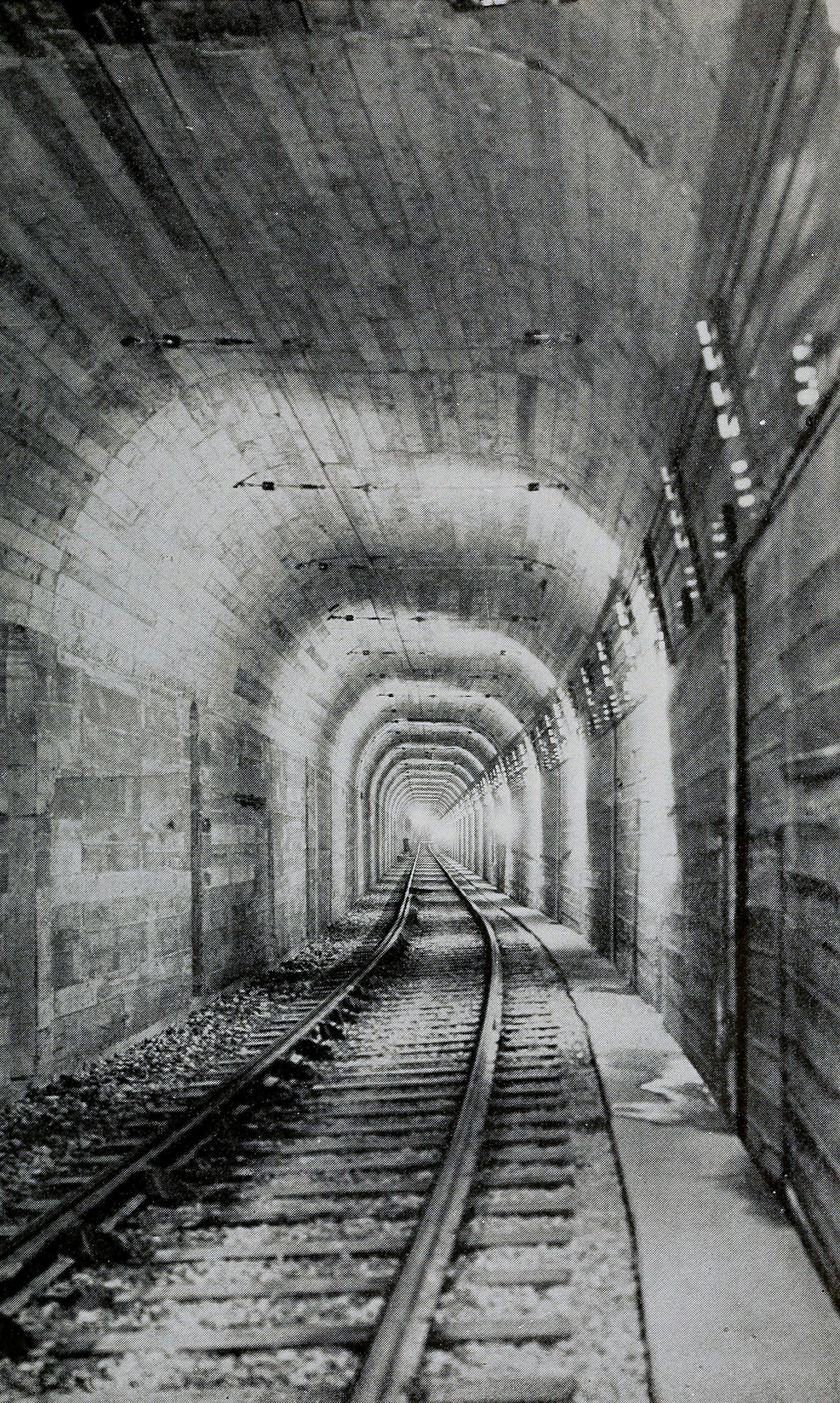
Interior view of Beacon Street subway, 1932

The Boylston Street subway is a light rail tunnel which lies primarily under Boylston Street in Boston, Massachusetts. In operation since 1914, it now carries all four branches of the MBTA Green Line from Kenmore Square under the Back Bay into downtown Boston, where it joins with the older Tremont Street subway. The tunnel originally ended just east of Kenmore Square; it was extended under the square to new portals at Blandford Street and Saint Mary's Street in 1932.

== History ==
In 1907, the Massachusetts General Court (the states legislature) approved what became today's Boylston Street subway, albeit began as the Riverbank subway. As well, it was not to be for street car (tram) use, rather for trains, with the same specifications as the then newly created Cambridge Connection (Red Line).

Named 'An Act to Provide for the Construction of an East and West Tunnel and Subway in the City of Boston', it was to run . . . "from a point or points in or under the existing Park street [sic} station, or any enlargement thereof . . ."

Its end point was roughly specified as being a point between Massachusetts Avenue and Governor's Square, where roadways Deerfield, Brookline, Commonweath and Beacon crossed. It was to run underneath Boston Common through Beacon Hill thence in the Charles River embankment.

However, in 1911, before construction had begun, a movement to shift its alignment had matured and the Massachusetts General Court directed that it run beneath Boylston Street. The Boston Elevated Railway Co., private operator of the city's rail system, and whose consent was needed, lobbied for the change, noting that Boylston Street was a more prudent choice market wise.

In 1912 construction began in the Commonwealth Ave. median, just east of today's Kenmore Square. By the summer of the following year, with progress having been made to near about Arlington Street, more consternation over the subway's route had appeared, with a question as to the tunnel's eastern end point. Arguments in the Massachusetts General Court (GC) were put forward to change it to Post Office Square.

The GC requested a report on the cost of such a change from the Boston Transit Commission, who while providing estimates, demurred based on the little time given for such analysis. In their report, they suggested to the GC that until time a more thorough consideration could be had, they tie the new tunnel into the end of the existing Tremont subway for temporary use by the street cars. The General Court agreed to this recommendation, legislating the temporary use by street cars, noting that the Boylston subway's legislated end point had not officially changed.

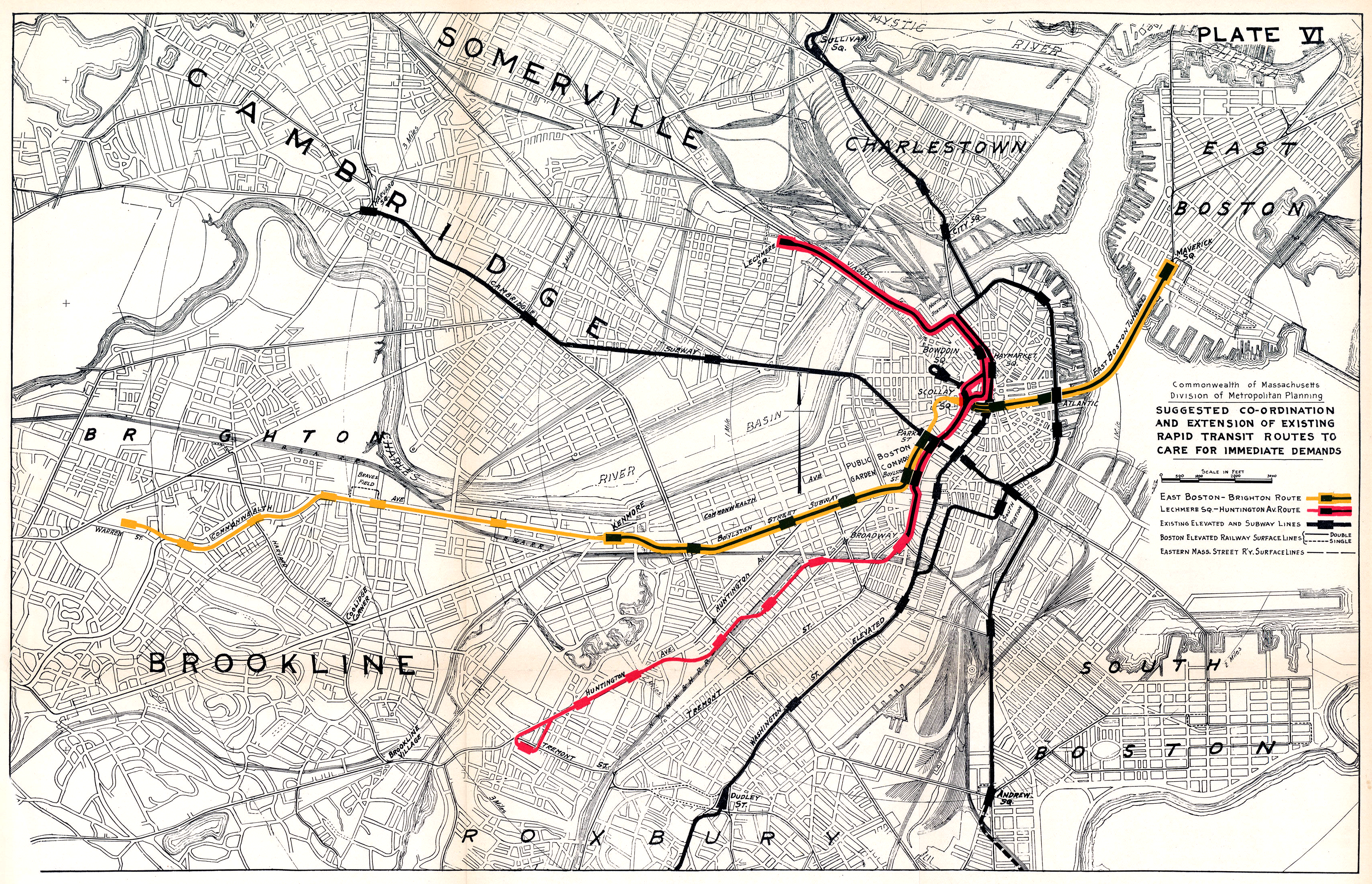
Map of 1926 proposal for Boston rapid transit lines showing linking the Boylston Tunnel with the East Boston Tunnel

By 1914 the 'temporary' connection was made, and most of the street cars on Boylston began using the new tunnel.

However, many retailers, those lying between the Boylston and Copley Square subway stops, felt robbed of customers. They put pressure on the Mayor, who then pushed the GC to legislate, in 1915, an 'infill' station at Arlington Street, a move opposed by the BTC and the system's operator.

A decade later, in 1926, a state metropolitan planning agency produced a rail proposal map, not only indicating train service in the tunnel, but also having it connected to the East Boston Tunnel, which had been converted from street cars to rapid transit in 1924.

By 1932, the tunnel was extended through Governor's Square with two new portals out Commonwealth and Beacon, and a new pre-pay station centered on Kenmore Street. The station was designed for use by both trains and street cars, with the intent that street car riders would have an easy connection to the train service; that plan still expected to be fulfilled.

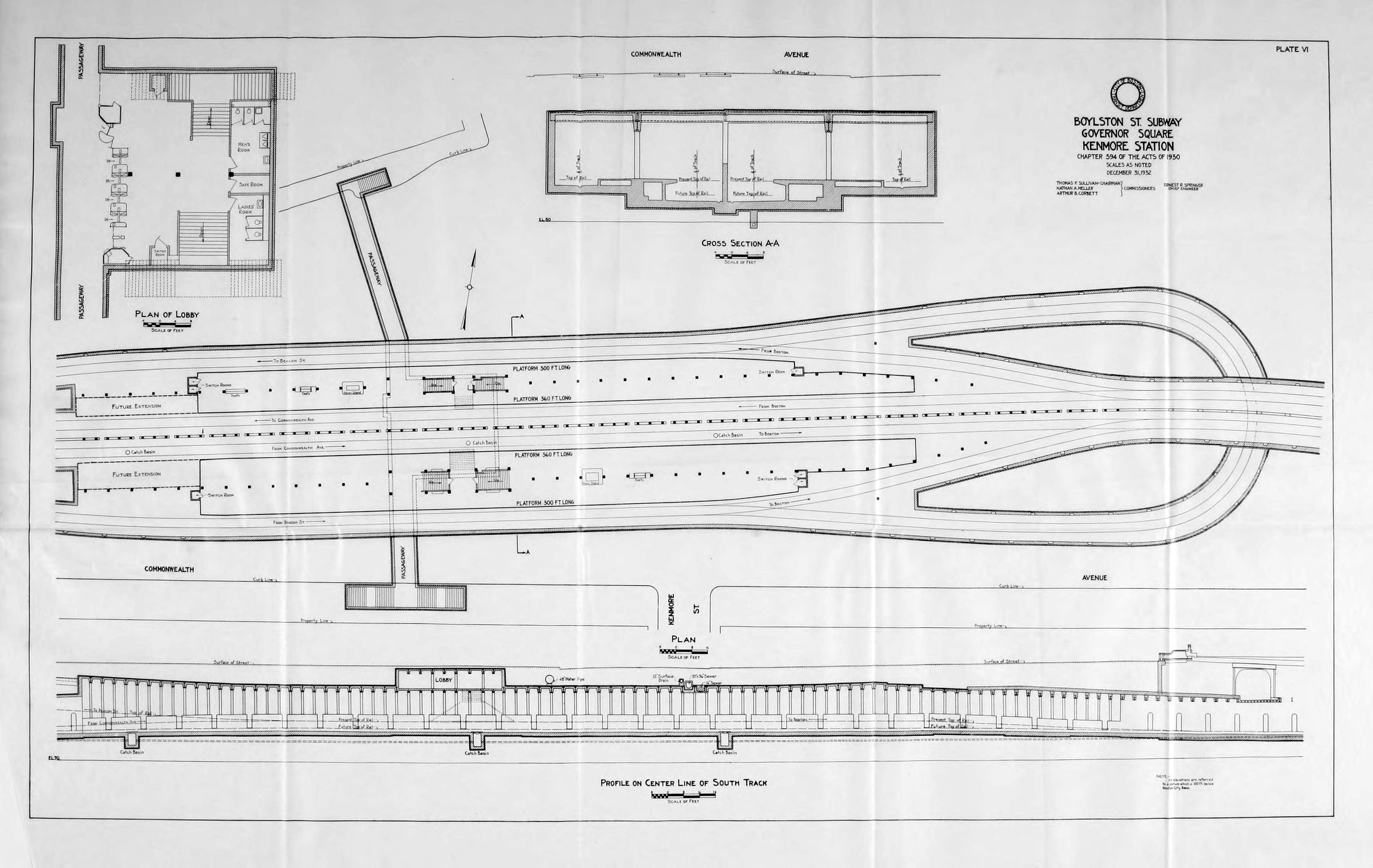
Plan for Kenmore Station, with center tracks allocated to train service

== Route ==
The eastern end of the tunnel is at the Tremont Street subway, just west of Boylston station near the intersection of Boylston Street and Tremont Street next to Boston Common. It then runs westward under Boylston Street; Arlington station is located at Arlington Street, and Copley station is at Dartmouth Street in Copley Square. The Huntington Avenue subway branches off to the south just to the west of Copley. The main line continues west under Boylston Street; at Hereford Street, it curves northward into Hynes Convention Center station at Massachusetts Avenue, then runs west under Newbury Street and the Muddy River and into Kenmore station at Kenmore Square.

The depth of the tunnel varies based on street considerations and other geography. At Arlington, Hynes Convention Center, and Kenmore, the tunnel is substantially below street level, and the stations have below-ground fare mezzanines offering access to both platforms; at Copley, the tunnel is shallower, and the fare gates are at platform level, with a free crossover to reverse direction not possible. The deepest section of the tunnel is under the Muddy River, in the Fenway neighborhood of Boston.

== See also ==
- Boylston Street Fishweir – archeological site discovered while excavating the Boylston Street subway
