= Mixed traffic =

Mixed traffic is a term that may refer to:

- A mixed-traffic locomotive
- A street running train, often said to be "running in mixed traffic"
