= Santa Ana–Huntington Beach Line =

Pacific Electric streetcar line (1907–1922)

Santa Ana–Huntington Beach

Overview
- Locale: Orange County, California
- Termini: Santa Ana; Huntington Beach

Service
- Type: Interurban
- System: Pacific Electric
- Operator(s): Pacific Electric

History
- Opened: July 5, 1909
- Closed: March 1922

Technical
- Line length: 13.31 mi (21.42 km)
- Track gauge: 1,435 mm (4 ft 8 1/2 in) standard gauge
- Electrification: Overhead line, 600 V DC

The Santa Ana–Huntington Beach Line is a former Pacific Electric interurban railway line in Orange County, California. Unlike most of the company's services, trains did not travel to Downtown Los Angeles and instead provided a suburban service between Santa Ana and Huntington Beach, for a time running as far as Balboa.

== History ==
The route was laid out by the Pacific Electric Land Company in 1907; the company existed solely to build and lease lines for Pacific Electric to operate. Service began on July 5, 1909. Several spur lines were constructed to transport sugar beets from farms near the route. The line came under full ownership of PE in 1911, two weeks following the Great Merger.

The service was truncated to terminate at Huntington Beach in the south starting on October 15, 1912. An evening car ran as far north as Orange in 1915. As a result of the 1918 Spanish flu pandemic, frequencies were reduced to a single daily round trip starting on October 27 of that year. In November 1921, a second round trip was added, but this was short lived as service was discontinued outright by the following March due to a bridge on the route being damaged in a flood. The line was formally abandoned on January 30, 1931.

The establishment of the Santa Ana Army Air Base in 1942 brought about demand by the government for direct rail service. As a result, PE built a single-track line which was owned by the government. No passenger service was provided; freight was exchanged at Greenville.

By mid-1948, Pacific Electric had purchased the requisite Southern Pacific Railroad lines to allow them to move freight to Newport and Huntington without the trip through Long Beach and Sunset Beach.

By the 1990s, the route through Santa Ana had largely been converted to the Pacific Electric Bicycle Path.

== Route ==
Leaving the Santa Ana Pacific Electric Depot, cars ran south on Maple Street to New Delhi, where a couple of branch lines met the main tracks and turned to the southwest for about a mile before continuing west, paralleling Alton Avenue. The line crossed the Santa Ana River, continuing until Bushard Street to turn south into Huntington Beach.

A segment of the right of way west from the former Dyer spur is used as the Union Pacific Santa Ana Industrial Lead. The north–south segment in Santa Ana paralleling Rousselle and Maple was partially rebuilt as a rail trail.

=== Stations ===
Station	Mile	Major connections	Opened	Service discontinued
Santa Ana	0	Santa Ana, Santa Ana–Orange	1905	1922
New Delhi	2.69		1909	1922
Acelga	5.60		1909	1922
Talbert	8.16		1909	1922
Bushard	10.53		1909	1922
Huntington Beach	13.31	Balboa, Huntington Beach–La Bolsa	1904	1922
Newport Beach			1905	1912
Balboa			1906	1912
