= Riverway station =

Light rail station in Boston, Massachusetts, US

Riverway
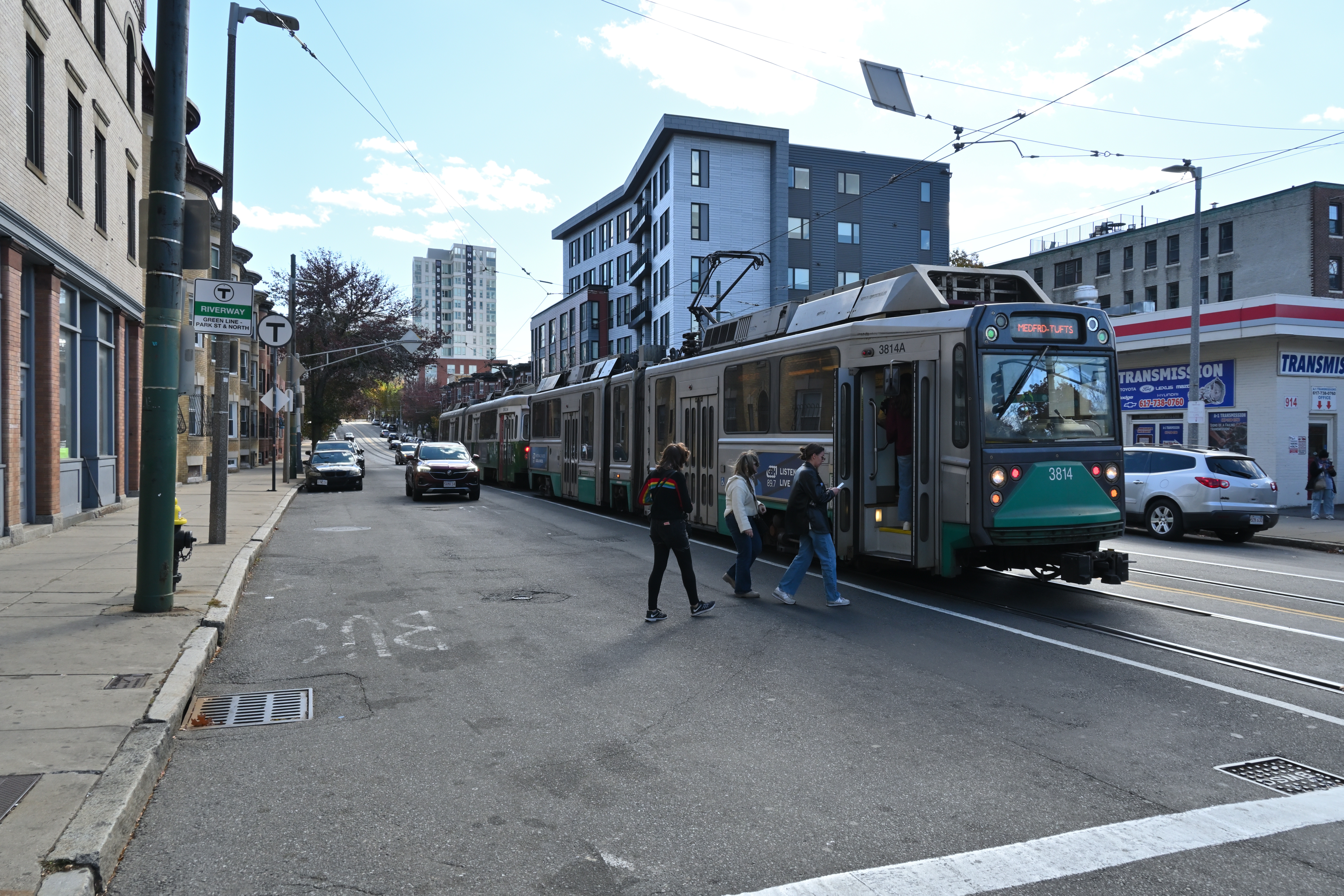
- Passengers board an inbound train at Riverway station in 2024

General information
- Location: South Huntington Avenue at Huntington Avenue; Boston, Massachusetts
- Coordinates: 42°19′54.1″N 71°6′43.2″W
- Platforms: None (passengers wait on sidewalk)
- Tracks: 2
- Connections: MBTA bus: 39, 66

Construction
- Accessible: No

History
- Rebuilt: 2028–2029 (planned)

Passengers
- 2013: 495 daily boardings

Services
Preceding station	MBTA	Following station
Back of the Hill toward Heath Street	Green Line E branch	Mission Park toward Medford/Tufts
Location

Riverway station is a light rail stop on the Green Line E branch of the MBTA subway system, located at the intersection of South Huntington Avenue and Huntington Avenue in Boston, Massachusetts, slightly east of Brookline Village. The station is named for the Riverway parkway which runs on an overpass just to the west. Riverway is also the closest surface transfer between the D and E branches of the Green Line; Brookline Village station is about 1,500 feet (460 m) to the west. The station is located on a street running segment of the E branch; trains run in mixed traffic rather than a dedicated median. The station has no platforms; riders wait on the sidewalks (shared with bus stops for the route 39 bus) and cross the street to reach trains. Riverway station is not accessible, a reconstruction for accessibility is planned in 2028–2029.

== Reconstruction ==
In 2021, the MBTA indicated plans to modify the Heath Street–Brigham Circle section of the E branch with accessible platforms to replace the existing non-accessible stopping locations. The new platforms are planned to be long enough to accommodate two 110-foot (34 m) Type 10 vehicles. Design work began in July 2023. In December 2024, the MBTA indicated that platforms would be built at Riverway and Mission Park, while Fenwood Road and Back of the Hill would be closed. As of October 2026, design work is expected to be completed in late 2027, with construction taking place in 2028–2029.
