= Mission Park =

Mission Park may refer to:

== Locations ==
- Mission Park, Santa Barbara (otherwise known as Mission Historical Park), a public park in Santa Barbara, California, US
- Mission Park station, a stop on the Massachusetts Bay Transportation Authority (MBTA) green line located in the Mission Hill neighborhood in Boston, Massachusetts, US

== Media and entertainment ==
- Mission Park (film), a 2013 drama by Bryan Ramirez

== See also ==
- Mission Bay Park, a man-made aquatic park in San Diego, California, US
- Old Mission State Park, Idaho, US
- Mission Raceway Park, Mission, BC, Canada
