= Fenwood Road station =

Light rail stop in Boston, Massachusetts, US

Fenwood Road
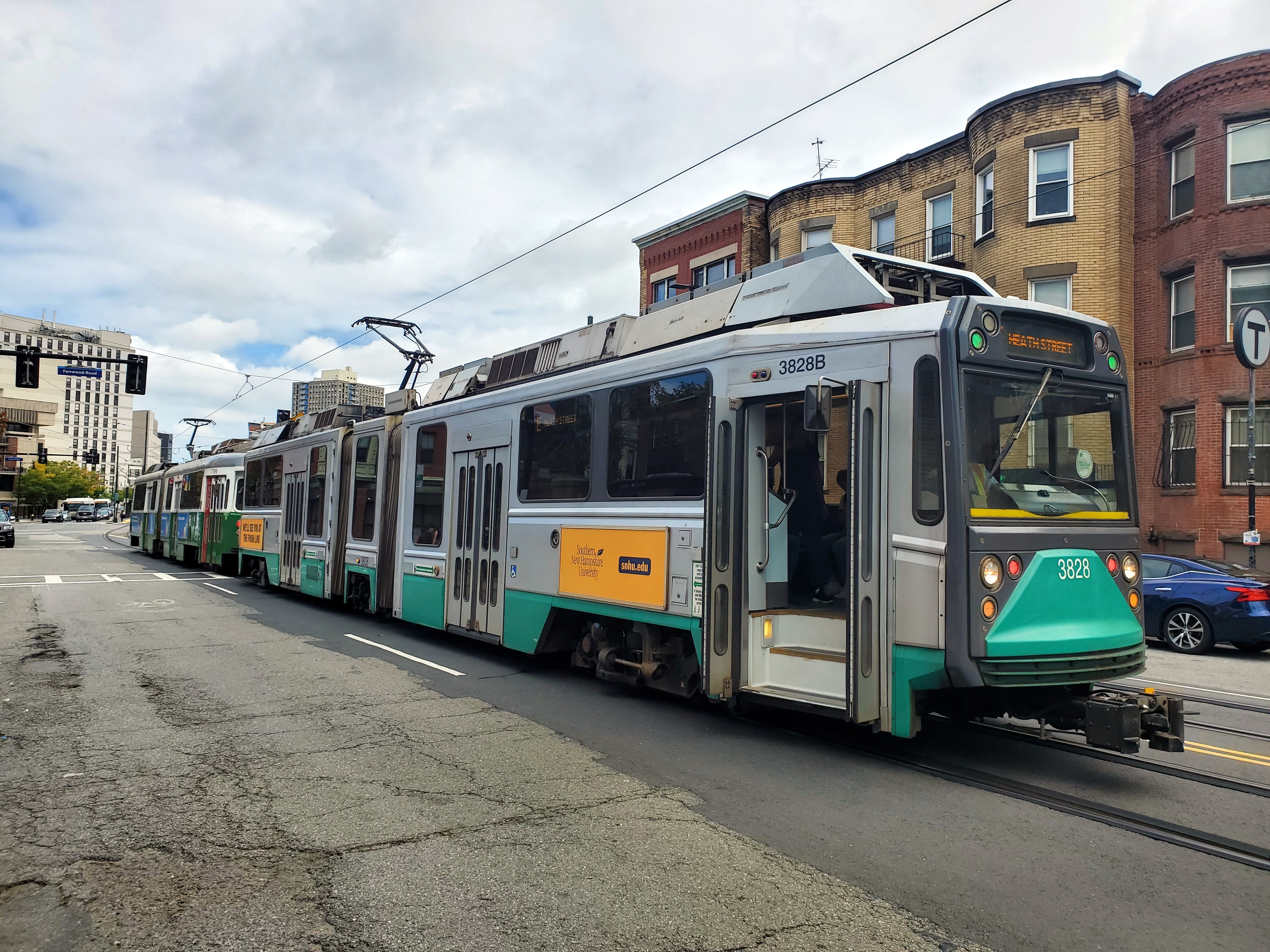
- An outbound train at Fenwood Road station in 2022

General information
- Location: Huntington Avenue at Fenwood Road; Boston, Massachusetts
- Coordinates: 42.3336°N 71.1059°W
- Platforms: None (passengers wait on sidewalk)
- Tracks: 2
- Connections: MBTA bus: 39, 66; Mission Hill Link

Construction
- Accessible: No

History
- Closed: Late 2020s (planned)

Passengers
- 2011: 221 daily boardings

Services
Preceding station	MBTA	Following station
Mission Park toward Heath Street	Green Line E branch	Brigham Circle toward Medford/Tufts
Location

Fenwood Road station is a light rail stop on the Green Line E branch of the MBTA subway system, located on Huntington Avenue at Fenwood Road in the Mission Hill neighborhood of Boston, Massachusetts. Fenwood Road is the third-least-used stop on the Green Line (after Back of the Hill and South Street), with 221 daily boardings by a 2011 count. The station is located on a street running segment of the E branch; trains run in mixed traffic rather than a dedicated median. The station has no platforms; riders wait on the sidewalks (shared with bus stops for the route 39 and 66 buses) and cross the street to reach trains. Because of this, the station is not accessible. The MBTA plans to close Fenwood Road station by late 2029 due to its close proximity to Brigham Circle station.

== Planned closure ==
In 2021, the MBTA indicated plans to modify the Heath Street–Brigham Circle section of the E branch with accessible platforms to replace the existing non-accessible stopping locations. Design work for the project began in July 2023. In December 2024, the MBTA indicated plans to close the Fenwood Road stop due to its proximity to Brigham Circle and the difficulty of building platforms at the site. As of October 2026, design work is expected to be completed in late 2027, with construction taking place in 2028–2029.
