= MBTA key bus routes =

High-frequency bus routes around Boston

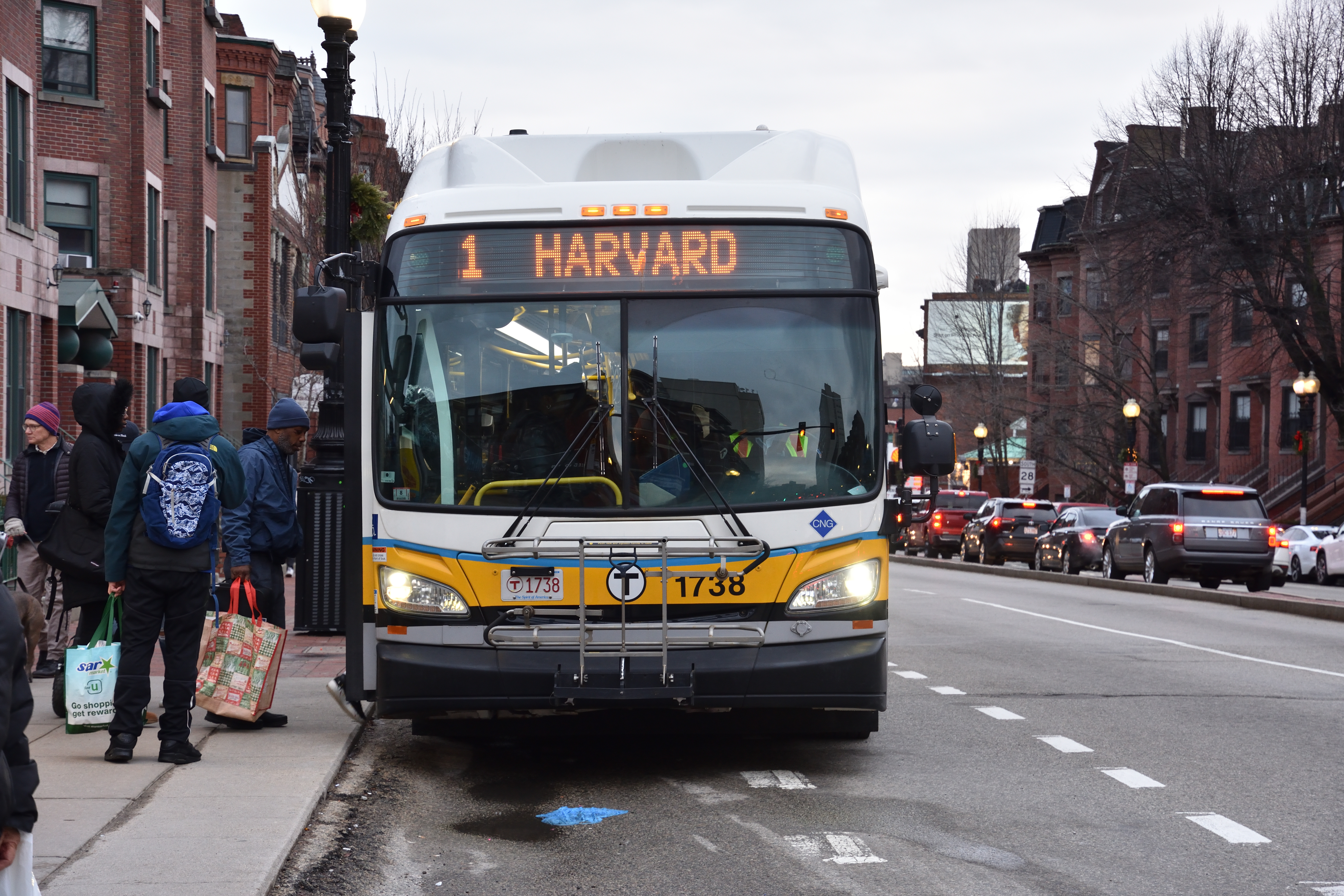
Route 1, which runs on Massachusetts Avenue, is one of the busiest MBTA bus routes, with service every 8 minutes during rush hour

Key bus routes of the Massachusetts Bay Transportation Authority (MBTA) system were the 15 routes that had high ridership and higher frequency standards than other bus lines, according to the 2004 MBTA Service Policy. Together, they accounted for roughly 40% of the MBTA's total bus ridership. These key bus routes ensured basic geographic coverage with frequent service in the densest areas of Boston, and connected to other MBTA services to give access to other areas throughout the region.

In recognition of their function as part of the backbone MBTA service, the key bus routes were added to newer basic route maps installed in subway stations and other public locations. These schematic route maps show the rail rapid transit routes, bus rapid transit routes, commuter rail services, and key bus routes. The key routes had been treated as a distinct category for the purpose of service improvement, such as trial runs of late-night service, and due to the high volume of passenger traffic they carry, both individual routes and the category as a whole have been the subjects of urban planning and transportation engineering studies. As part of the implementation of the MBTA's Bus Network Redesign program in 2024, the key bus route terminology is being phased out and replaced by a general high-frequency route network.

== History ==
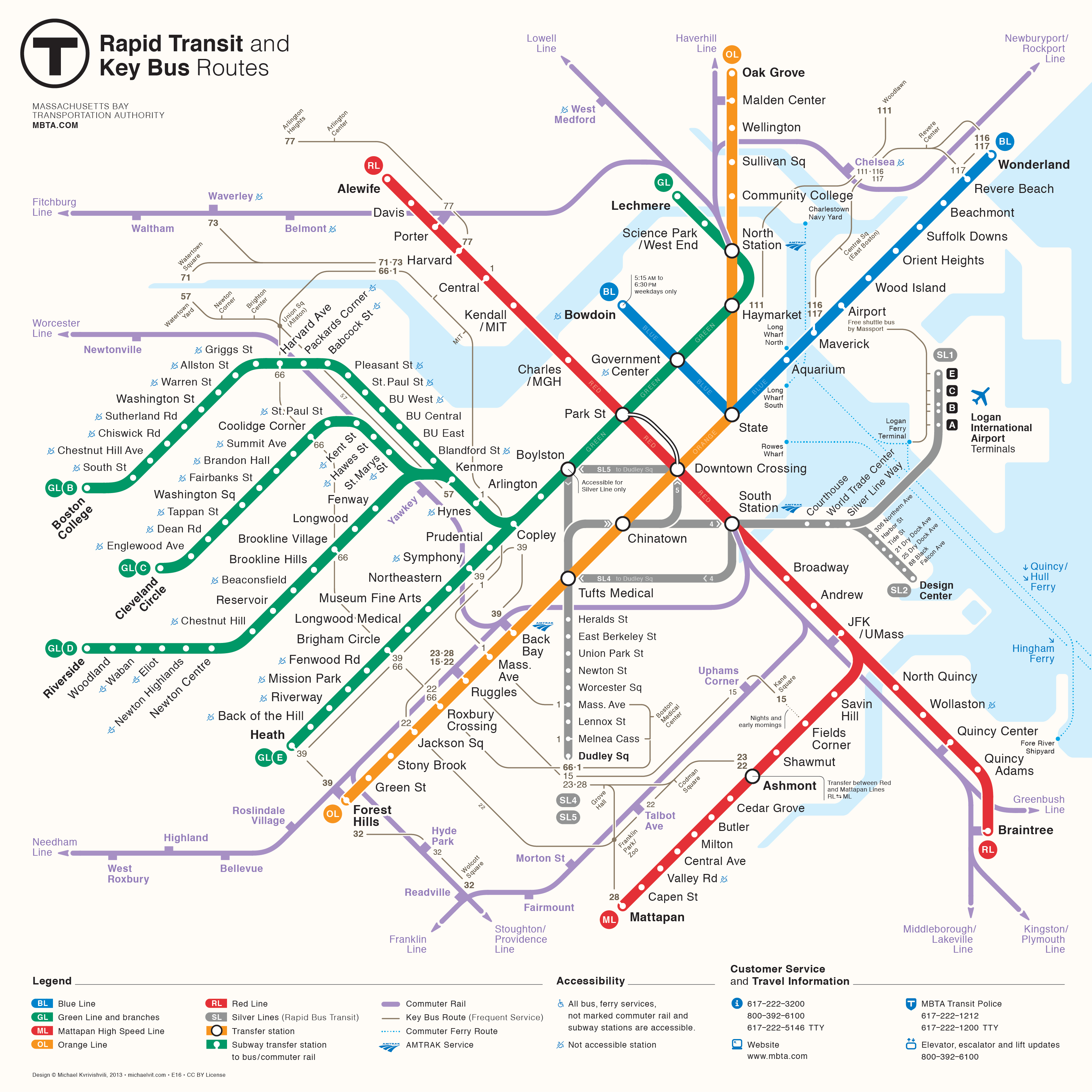
The MBTA began adding the key bus routes to its rapid transit map in 2009. This is a 2013 draft by Michael Kvrivishvili, modified into the official map in 2014, that shows the key routes as thinner lines on the rapid transit map.

In November 2006, the MBTA launched a concerted effort to improve service quality on key bus routes. The 2008 Service Plan recommended improvements for various lines, including upgrading the 31 bus to key route standards. A second round of upgrades, entitled the Key Routes Improvement Project and costing $10 million in all, was supported by the American Recovery and Reinvestment Act of 2009. The Silver Line services were originally considered part of this program, but were later split off into a separate enhancement project.

The initial Key Routes Improvement Project was concluded in 2013, with some planned upgrades not being made. Due to these changes, the reliability of service (as measured by adherence to posted service frequencies) has been found to be greater on the Key Routes than on others, with 75% versus 61% respectively in June 2017.

A 2012 statistical analysis found that proximity to key bus routes was inversely correlated to taxicab trip generation, whereas taxicab trip generation actually increased with proximity to bus routes overall, suggesting that only the routes with highest frequency were able to compete with taxi service among customers with the option to choose.

In April 2014, extended late-night service on the key bus routes and rapid transit routes was announced, to be operated on a one-year trial basis with service continuation depending on late-night ridership and on corporate sponsorship. As of April 2015, late-night service was cut back from 2:30am to 2:00am, and extended hours were dropped from 5 of the 15 key bus routes. Late-night service was discontinued altogether in March 2016.

The category of key bus routes figured into Boston mayor Marty Walsh's "Go Boston 2030" initiative, which included the goal of having "every Boston household" within a 10-minute walk from a T station or a bus stop on a key route. In addition, a new key route was proposed to connect the Longwood Medical and Academic Area with JFK/UMass station via Roxbury.

In May 2022, the MBTA released a draft plan for a bus network redesign, which included potential changes to most of the key routes. A number of other routes would be upgraded to key bus route frequency, forming a high-frequency bus network complementing the rapid transit network. A revised plan was released in November 2022.

=== Key routes criteria ===
The MBTA's Service Delivery Policy uses five criteria when determining if a route is part of the Key Bus Routes program.

- High ridership demand
- Connectivity within the system
- Geographic coverage
- Accommodation of major new development
- Operation as bus rapid transit

=== Policy standards ===
A bus route that has been identified as a key route must adhere to two policy standards: Span of service and frequency of service, both of which mandate service levels well above a standard local route. The following tables outline these standards as compared to standard local routes.

Type of Route	Span of service (minimum)	
Local	Weekday	7:00 AM – 6:30 PM
Local	Saturday	8:00 AM – 6:30 PM
Local	Sunday	10:00 AM – 6:30 PM
Key	Weekday	6:00 AM – Midnight
Key	Saturday	6:00 AM – Midnight
Key	Sunday	7:00 AM – Midnight

Type of Route	Frequency of service (minimum)	
Local	AM & PM peak	Every 30 mins
Local	All other times	Every 60 mins
Local	Saturdays & Sundays	Every 60 mins
Key	AM & PM peak	Every 10 mins
Key	Middays	Every 15 mins
Key	Evenings, Saturdays & Sundays	Every 20 mins

== Route list ==
There were 15 key routes within the MBTA system: 1, 15, 22, 23, 28, 32, 39, 57, 66, 71, 73, 77, 111, 116, and 117. Elected officials and members of the public have asked the MBTA for limited-stop or express service along all of these routes.

=== 1 ===
The 1 Harvard Square–Nubian Station, which connects Cambridge with Roxbury, was formed in September 1962 when two routes, split at Massachusetts Avenue (now Hynes Convention Center), were merged – the 76 Harvard–Massachusetts station and the 47 Massachusetts station–Dudley. In May 1987, the route was realigned from its former alignment on Washington Street southeast several blocks onto Albany Street and Melnea Cass Boulevard to serve Boston Medical Center. The route now runs mostly along Massachusetts Avenue, from Harvard, past the Massachusetts Institute of Technology, over the Charles River via the Harvard Bridge into Boston, past the Berklee College of Music to Boston Medical Center, then southwest to Nubian station via Albany Street and Melnea Cass Boulevard.

No changes to the route were proposed in the May and November 2022 network plan. The transit advocacy group Transitmatters rated the 1 bus the slowest and most bunched MBTA bus route, with a mean speed of 6.55 mph and a bunching rate of 17.7% (meaning 1 out of every 6 buses is bunched) during October 2023. Service changes effective August 24, 2025, increased Route 1 frequency to every 15 minutes or less during all operating hours. Service also began operating about one hour longer on Friday and Saturday evenings.

=== 15 ===
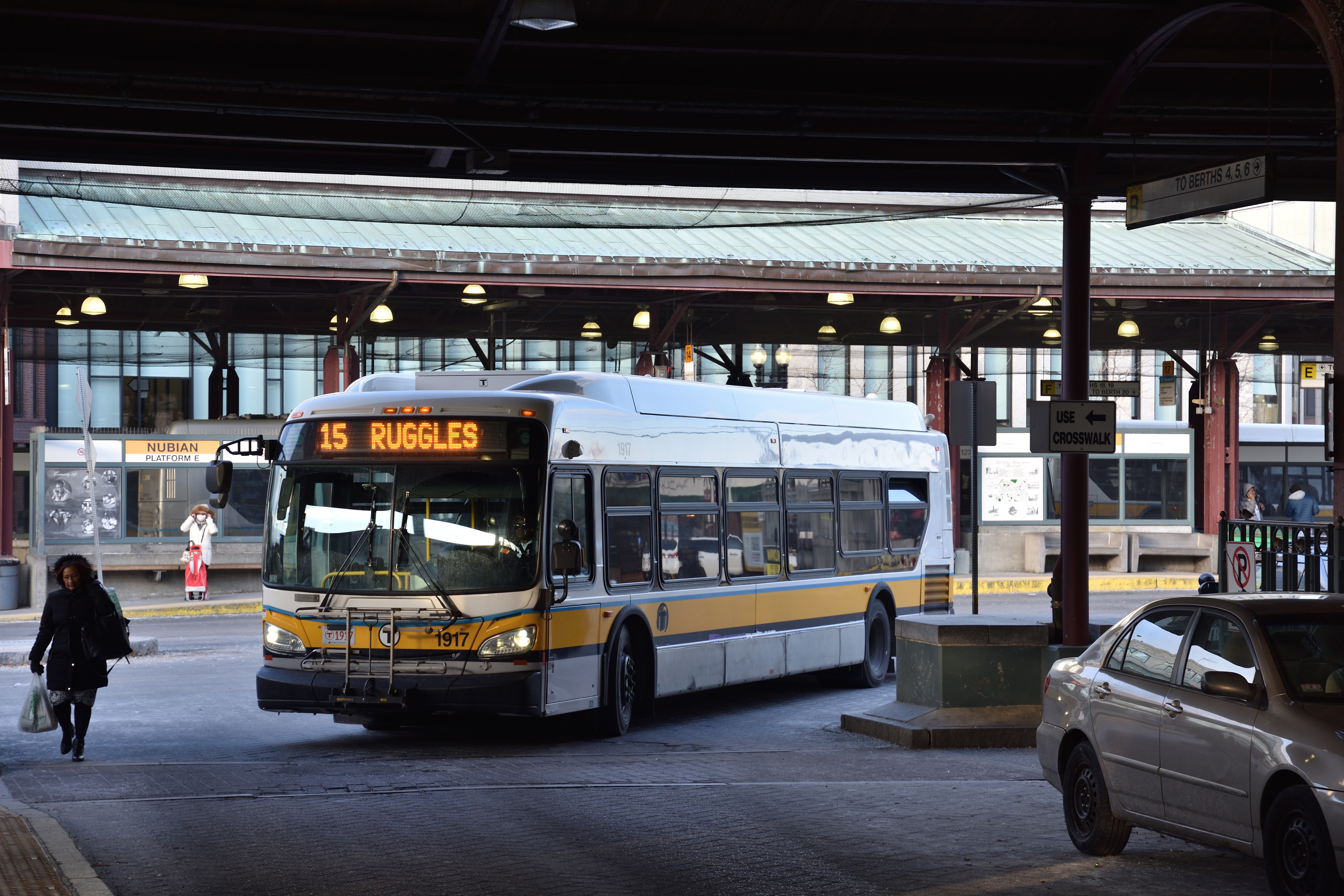
A route 15 bus at Nubian station in 2024

The 15 Fields Corner Station–Ruggles Station route runs from Fields Corner station north on Geneva Avenue and Bowdoin Street, west on Hancock Street, and north on Columbia Street to Uphams Corner. It continues west on Dudley Street to Nubian station, then west on Malcolm X Boulevard to Roxbury Crossing and north on Tremont Street to Ruggles station.

Buses started running on the 15 Kane Square–Dudley via Uphams Corner and Dudley Street route on April 6, 1962, replacing trackless trolleys. With the relocation of the Orange Line to the Southwest Corridor in May 1987, the route was extended to Ruggles. Kane Square service was extended slightly to St. Peter's Square on August 25, 2024. All service was extended to Fields Corner on August 24, 2025; previously, only night and weekend service had run past St. Peters Square. Frequency was also increased to every 15 minutes or less during all operating hours.

The May 2022 draft network plan proposed an extension westward to Oak Square (taking over route 65), forming an Oak Square–Fields Corner route. The November 2022 draft network plan cut the route back to Ruggles, with route 65 remaining separate.

=== 22 ===
The 22 Ashmont Station–Ruggles Station via Talbot Ave begins at Ashmont and runs on a northwesterly route to the former site of Egleston station. From there it continues north on Columbus Avenue and Tremont Street along the course of the Orange Line before ending at Ruggles.

Buses replaced trackless trolleys on the 22 on April 6, 1962, running as the 22 Ashmont–Dudley via Talbot and Warren. This route, rather than turning off Blue Hill Avenue onto Seaver Street, continued north a bit further and then went north on Warren Street to end at Dudley Square. It was extended to Ruggles in May 1987 along with the relocation of the Orange Line to the Southwest Corridor. The May and November 2022 network plans proposed that the inner terminal be changed to the Longwood Medical Area. Service changes effective August 24, 2025, increased Route 22 frequency to every 15 minutes or less during all operating hours. Service also began operating about one hour longer on Friday and Saturday evenings.

=== 23 ===
The 23 Ashmont Station–Ruggles Station via Washington Street has the same endpoints as the 22, but uses a mostly different route. It starts out of Ashmont on Talbot Avenue, but turns north on Washington Street, following that onto Warren Street to Nubian station. From Nubian, the 23 heads west on Malcolm X Boulevard to Roxbury Crossing and north on Tremont Street to Ruggles station.

Buses replaced trackless trolleys on April 7, 1962, on the 22 Ashmont–Dudley via Washington Street and Warren. It was extended to Ruggles in May 1987 along with the relocation of the Orange Line to the Southwest Corridor.

A 2017 study of fare-card and vehicle-location data suggested that the 23 and 28 routes were overcrowded, and that this could be ameliorated by extending the 29 route and increasing its service frequency. A city-funded program includes fare-free service on routes 23, 28, and 29 from March 1, 2022, to February 28, 2026. No changes to the route were proposed in the May and November 2022 network plans. Service changes effective August 24, 2025, increased Route 23 frequency to every 15 minutes or less during all operating hours. Service also began operating about one hour later in the evening.

=== 28 ===
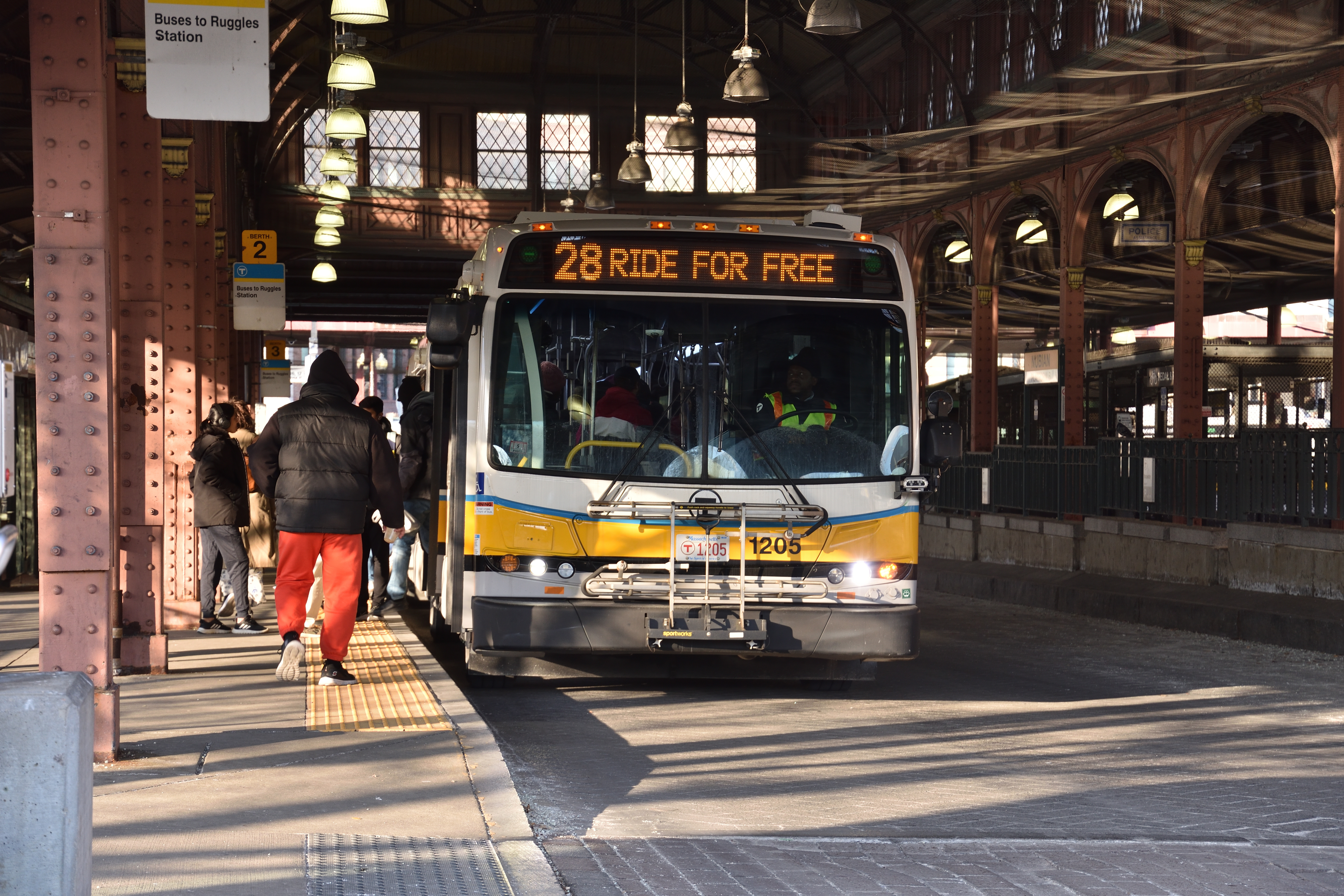
A route 28 bus at Nubian station in 2024 with its headsign advertising the fare-free program

The 28 Mattapan Station–Ruggles Station route provides service through the Grove Hall and Mattapan neighborhoods on Blue Hill Avenue, a major radial arterial. Blue Hill Avenue has long been a busy trunk route; in 1945, route 29 Mattapan–Egleston peaked at 1.5 minute headways during the morning rush hour. Streetcars formerly had a dedicated right-of-way on Blue Hill Avenue; streetcars were moved into mixed traffic in stages between 1940 and 1950, and replaced with buses in 1955.

With the May 1987 changes to the bus network, route 28 was established to supplement route 29 service; both ran from Mattapan to Ruggles via different routings. In December 1989, route 28 became the dominant service on Blue Hill Avenue, and route 29 was relegated to a rush-hour-only route running only to Jackson Square. Shelters were added at some stops in 2001. From December 2006 to June 2010, short turn service between Franklin Park and Dudley (Ruggles after March 2007) was operated in the morning peak as route 25.

A number of Silver Line expansion corridors were considered in the 2003 Program for Mass Transportation (PMT); most were given brief consideration but not acted upon. One, a bus rapid transit (BRT) express overlay for the 28, was briefly revived in 2006 as part of Silver Line Phase III plans. In 2009, the state proposed to add a limited-stop BRT line called the 28X on the corridor, which was then the busiest bus corridor in New England. The plan called for dedicated bus lanes on Blue Hill Avenue and queue jumps on Warren Avenue. The project was expected to cost $114 million. Construction was to begin in April 2010, with initial service at the beginning of 2012.

However, the proposal quickly drew opposition: it had been announced at a press conference by state officials without local officials having even been informed of the project, leading to accusations that the plan was rushed to qualify for TIGER grant funding without community input. Residents also objected because the dedicated bus lanes would require removing parking spots and the median strip, and the construction process would disrupt traffic on Blue Hill Avenue for over a year. The state withdrew the proposal in late 2009. In June 2010, the MBTA replaced 40-foot buses on the route with 60-foot buses; although the swap added capacity on the busy route, residents objected to the removal of some bus stops in hilly Grove Hall to accommodate the longer vehicles. In 2012, the Roxbury–Dorchester–Mattapan Transit Needs Study recommended the 28X bus to be implemented with no new infrastructure as an express bus adding additional trips to the corridor.

In August 2020, the MBTA and the city applied for $15 million in federal funds for a planned $30 million construction of Blue Hill Avenue. The project would include center-running bus lanes and be completed by the end of 2021. The federal government rejected the funding request in September 2020. A second $25 million application was submitted in July 2021. A pilot program of free fares and all-door boarding on route 28 ran from August 29, 2021, to February 28, 2022. The $500,000 pilot, funded by the city using American Rescue Plan monies, intends to reduce travel times on the frequently-late route. A city-funded program includes fare-free service on routes 23, 28, and 29 from March 1, 2022, to February 28, 2026. In November 2021, the city was awarded a $15 million federal grant (out of then-estimated $39.5 million project cost) for the Blue Hill Avenue reconstruction.

The May and November 2022 network plans proposed that route 28 be extended from Roxbury Crossing to Kenmore via the Longwood Medical Area; the Roxbury Crossing–Ruggles segment would be discontinued. In February 2024, the city announced plans for a $44 million reconstruction of Blue Hill Avenue including center bus lanes, with construction expected to start in 2026. Service changes effective August 24, 2025, increased Route 28 frequency to every 15 minutes or less during all operating hours. Service also began operating about one hour later in the evening. In February 2026, an $80 million federal appropriation completed $160 million in funding for the project.

=== 32 ===
The 32 Wolcott or Cleary Square–Forest Hills Station route runs along Hyde Park Avenue from Forest Hills to Readville, serving Jamaica Plain, Roslindale, and Hyde Park. It parallels the commuter rail tracks from Forest Hills to Readville for its entire route.

Up until 1953, Route 32 was a full-service trolley route from Forest Hills to Cleary Square, until it converted to trackless trolleys. In 1958, all trackless trolley services south of Forest Hills were discontinued and replaced by diesel buses. (The trolleys ended in the middle of Hyde Park Ave; however, a loop for the trackless trolleys to turn around was placed on Hyde Park Avenue and Pine St.)

In 1981, the former Route 31 bus route between Mattapan Square and Wolcott Square was consolidated with Route 32 at Cleary Square to become Route 32 Forest Hills–Wolcott Square. Route 50, which served Cleary Square and Forest Hills via Roslindale, was rerouted onto River St, Gordon Avenue, Summer St (inbound) and Austin St (outbound) to serve the Summer St Elderly Housing Area (aka Malone Elderly Housing). No changes to the route were proposed in the May and November 2022 network plans. Effective December 14, 2025, route 32 is scheduled to operate every 15 minutes or less during normal service hours.

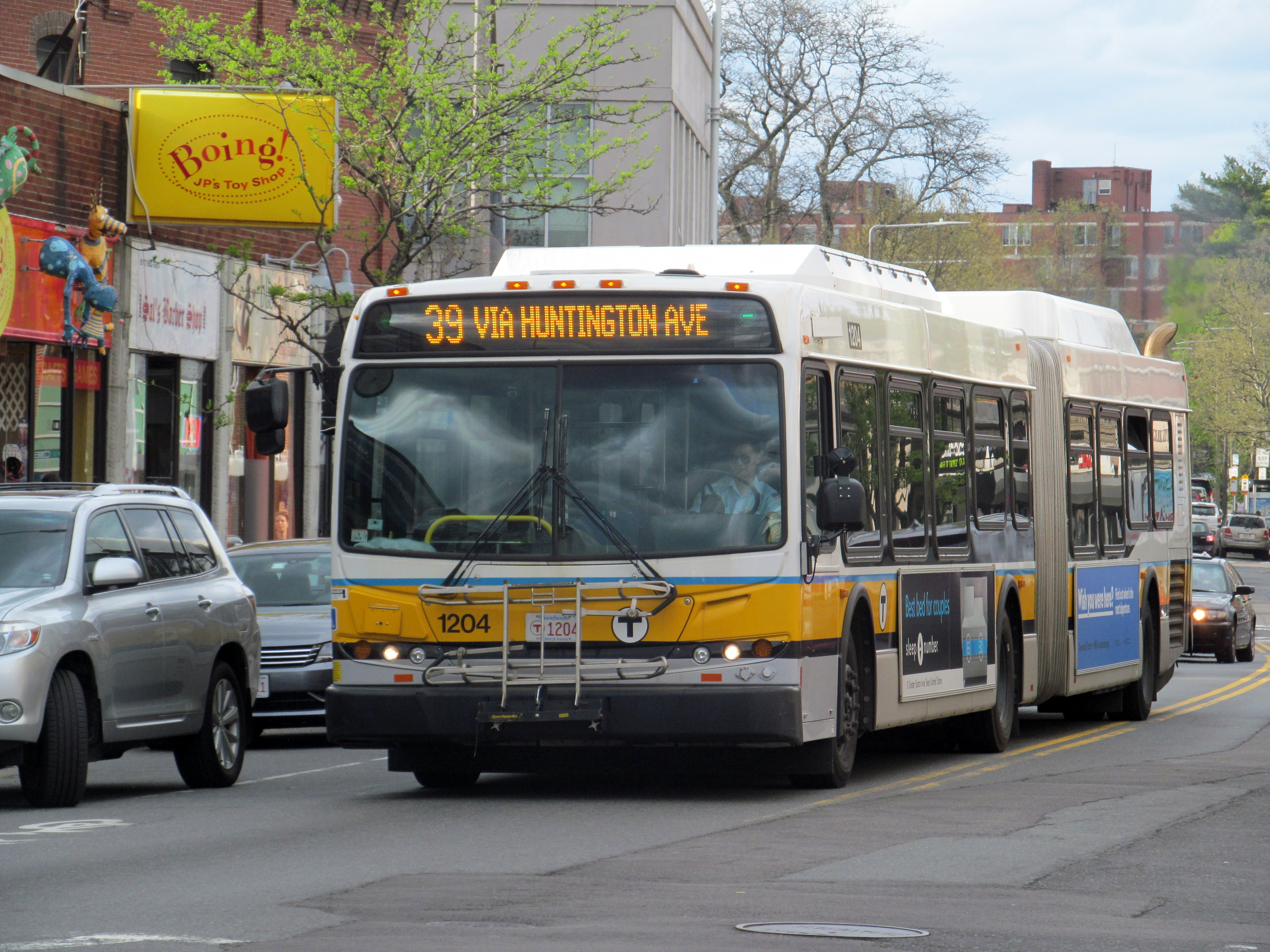
Route 39 bus on Centre Street in 2017

=== 39 ===
The 39 Forest Hills Station–Back Bay Station route is the replacement (described as "temporary" from 1985 until 2011) for Green Line E branch service from Heath Street to Arborway which has run since December 1985. Aside from paralleling the Green Line from Heath Street to Copley, there are connections to the Orange Line and commuter rail at both ends (and Amtrak at the latter). Route 39 was the first MBTA route to regularly use articulated buses, which were later introduced to several other routes (including the 28) in late 2005. As of 2013, the 39 was the second most heavily used bus line in the city. The high ridership of the 39 was one motivation for expanding the Forest Hills station during the Casey Arborway overhaul.

The May 2022 draft network plan proposed that route 39 be extended to Porter via Central and Fenway, taking over portions of routes 47, 91, and 87. The portion from Longwood Avenue to Back Bay would be discontinued. The November 2022 draft network plan reverted route 39 to its existing routing, with a more frequent route 47 instead extended to Union Square.

=== 57 ===
The 57 Watertown Yard–Kenmore Station route passes through Boston, Newton and Watertown. It is the replacement for the Green Line A branch service which was discontinued in 1969. Route 57 was formerly one of the few routes that ran limited-stop service in the Boston city limits (no pickups were made on Commonwealth Avenue between Packard's Corner and Kenmore), but this practice was discontinued in December 2006. No changes to the route were proposed in the May and November 2022 network plans.

=== 66 ===
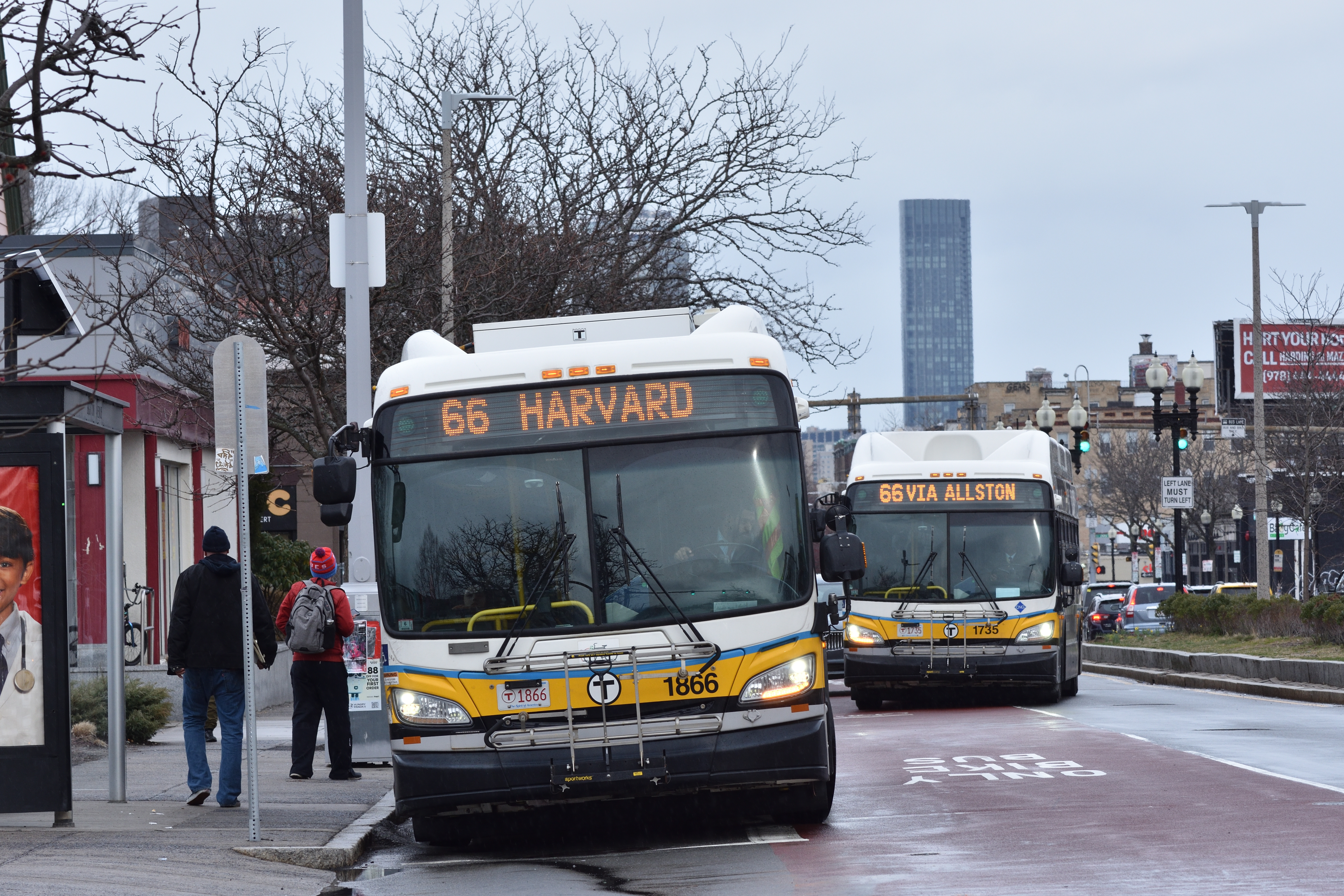
A bunched pair of route 66 buses in Allston

The 66 Harvard Square–Nubian Station via Allston route, formerly a trolley line, begins at Nubian Square in Roxbury, and crosses the Southwest Corridor Park at Roxbury Crossing. The route follows Route 39 and the Green Line E branch on a short segment from Brigham Circle to the Boston city limits. Traveling via Harvard Street, this bus serves Brookline and Allston, diverting to Union Square (Allston) before following Cambridge Street and North Harvard Street, and terminating at Harvard Square, Cambridge.

As a major crosstown route, it connects Nubian station on the Silver Line to Roxbury Crossing on the Orange Line; as well as Fenwood Rd, Mission Park, and Riverway on the Green Line E branch; Brookline Village on the Green Line D branch; Coolidge Corner on the Green Line C branch; Harvard Ave on the Green Line B branch; and Harvard on the Red Line.

The May and November 2022 network plans proposed to have route 66 run on Brookline Avenue and Francis Street – rather than Huntington Avenue – between Brookline Village and Brigham Circle. In August 2024, northbound buses were rerouted into the Harvard Bus Tunnel. Service began operating about one hour longer on Friday and Saturday evenings effective August 24, 2025. Effective December 14, 2025, route 66 is scheduled to operate every 15 minutes or less during normal service hours.

=== 71 ===
The 71 Watertown Square–Harvard station begins at the Harvard bus tunnel lower level and leaves via the south exit onto Mount Auburn Street. It heads west into Watertown, ending at Watertown Square.

At the Harvard end, to turn around, the bus exits the tunnel and makes a hard left onto Massachusetts Avenue and a right on Garden Street, and then turns right on Waterhouse Street and right on Massachusetts Avenue to return to the tunnel. The Watertown end has a loop on private right-of-way for turning around and picking up/dropping off passengers.

September 4, 1958, was the last day of streetcar service on the 71. Trackless trolleys ran from then until March 13, 2022.

In 2017, the 71 and 73 were selected for a bus rapid transit pilot program.

Routes 71 and 73, along with the adjacent routes 72 and 77A, ran with trolleybuses (locally referred to as "trackless trolleys") for decades after all such other routes in the MBTA system had been eliminated, representing some of the last vestiges of Boston's once-extensive trackless trolley network. They were finally converted to diesel bus operation on March 13, 2022. No changes to the route were proposed in the May and November 2022 network plans. However, the city of Watertown plans to extend the route slightly to Watertown Yard as part of a reconfiguration of Watertown Square. Effective December 14, 2025, route 71 is scheduled to operate every 15 minutes or less during normal service hours.

=== 73 ===
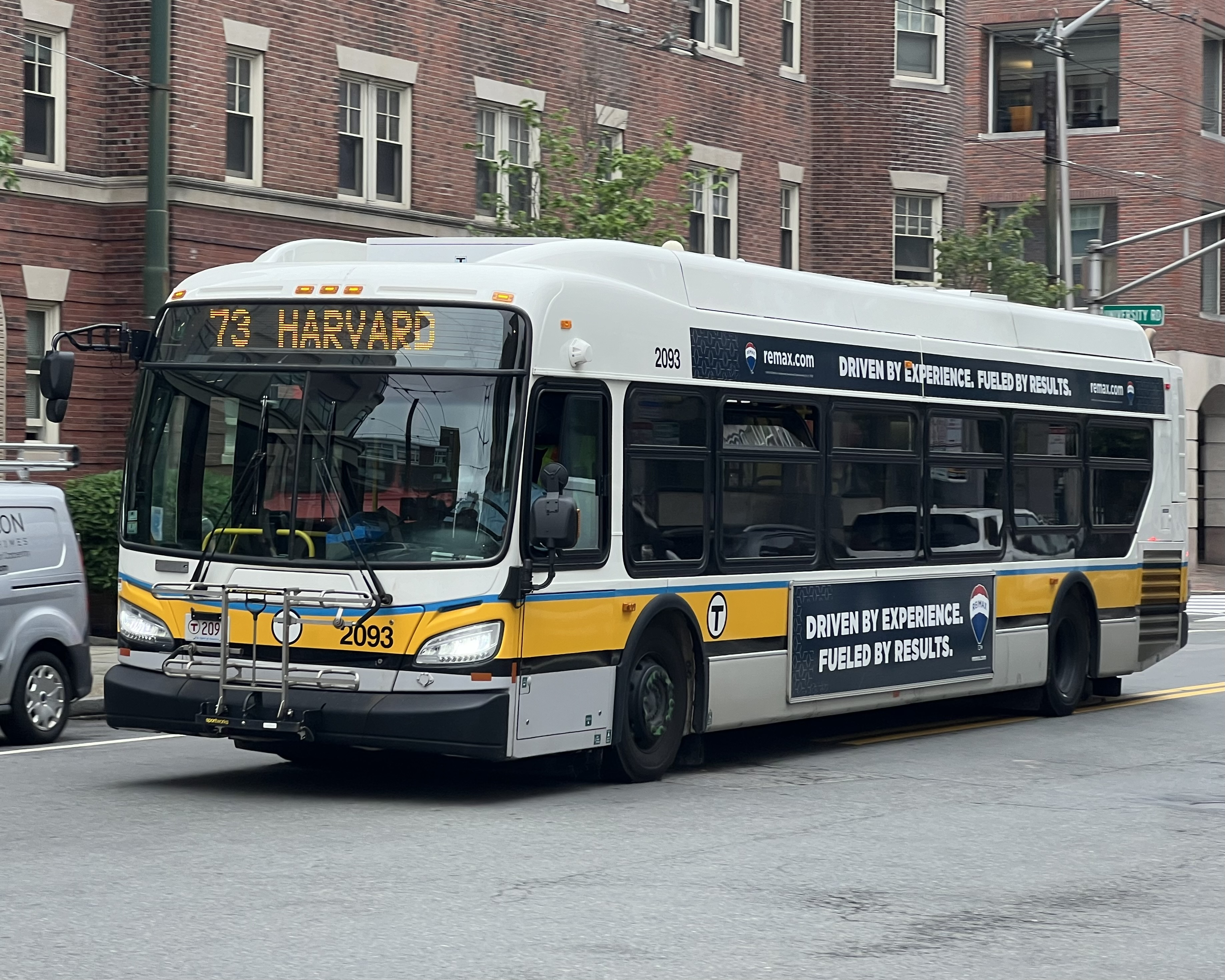
A route 73 bus near Harvard Square in 2024

The 73 Waverley Square–Harvard Station begins in the Harvard bus tunnel and runs concurrent with the 71 bus along Mount Auburn Street in Cambridge and Watertown. It leaves Mount Auburn Street to follow Belmont Street, which forms a border between Belmont and Watertown, then continues on Trapelo Road in Belmont to end at Waverley Square, looping at the Waverley commuter rail station on the Fitchburg Line.

Until the 1950s, streetcars served this route. Starting in 1957, trackless trolleys provided short-turn service from Harvard to Benton Square, and the entirety of Route 73 was converted from streetcars to trackless trolleys in 1958. Trackless trolleys ran from then until March 13, 2022. No changes to the route were proposed in the May and November 2022 network plans. Effective December 14, 2025, route 73 is scheduled to operate every 15 minutes or less during normal service hours.

=== 77 ===
The 77 Arlington Heights–Harvard Station route provides service between the town of Arlington and Harvard station along Massachusetts Avenue.

Until the Red Line Northwest Extension opened in the 1980s, routes 77/77A provided the bulk of transit service northwest of Harvard, with combined streetcar headways under one minute during rush hours in 1945. Route 77 was converted to diesel bus in 1955; route 77A (Harvard–North Cambridge carhouse short-turn service) was converted to trolleybus in 1958 to free up streetcars for the upcoming Highland branch conversion, and so that boarding islands on Massachusetts Avenue could be removed to benefit automobiles. Route 77A formerly provided all local service south of the carhouse, with route 77 making limited stops on that segment; however, it was largely replaced by route 77 service in stages from 1998 to 2005, and eliminated in 2022. In 2017, Arlington applied for a private grant to add signal priority, queue jumps, and possibly bus lanes on their section of the route. No changes to the route were proposed in the May and November 2022 network plans. Effective December 14, 2025, route 77 is scheduled to operate every 15 minutes or less during normal service hours.

=== 111 ===
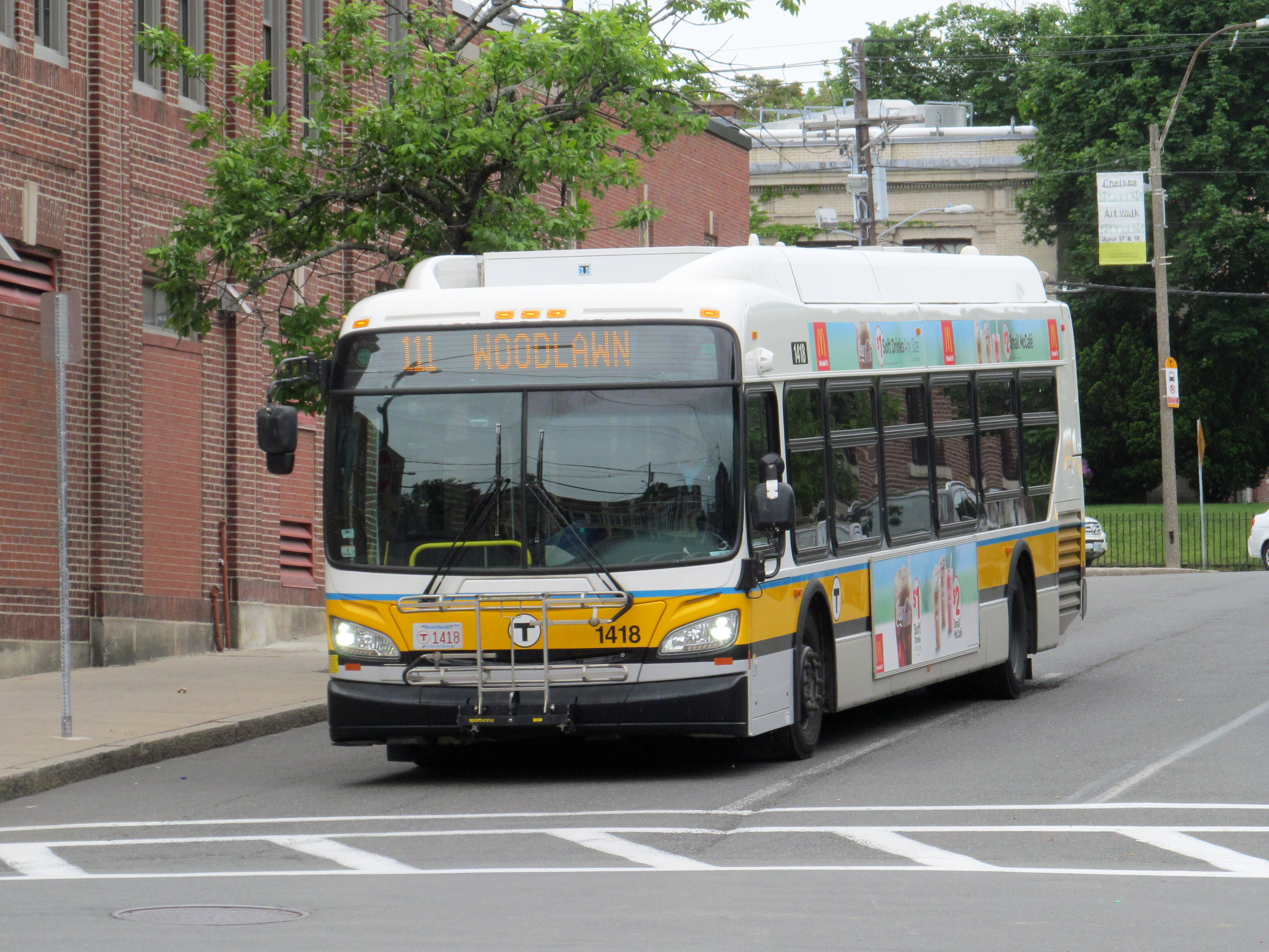
A route 111 bus near Fay Square in 2017

The 111 Woodlawn–Haymarket Station provides a route between downtown Boston and parts of Chelsea, via the Bill Russell Bridge and the Tobin Bridge. (Some trips formerly continued east as far as Revere.) When the Boston Elevated Railway bought the route in 1936, it ran as streetcars between Chelsea Square and Woodlawn. On October 10, 1936, the line was replaced by an extension of the City Square–Chelsea Square bus route. The line was extended in April 1975 to Haymarket after the closure of the Charlestown Elevated; the partial extension beyond Woodlawn was done in January 2001. Service past Woodlawn was discontinued in September 2019, while Cary Square short turns were replaced by Woodlawn trips in December 2021.

The 111 is among the most frequent numbered MBTA bus routes, with service running every 5 minutes during rush hour. No changes to the route were proposed in the May and November 2022 network plans. Service changes effective August 24, 2025, added about one hour to the span of evening service.

=== 116/117 ===
The 116 Wonderland Station–Maverick Station via Revere Street and 117 Wonderland station–Maverick station via Beach Street served East Boston and the cities of Chelsea and Revere. The 116 and 117 shared most of their routes through East Boston and Revere, differing only on the northern end near Wonderland. The May and November 2022 network plans proposed to discontinue route 117. The segment between Broadway and Wonderland station was to become an extension of route 110 at key bus route frequency. The change occurred on December 15, 2024. Service changes effective August 24, 2025, added about one hour to the span of evening service.

== See also ==
- List of MBTA bus routes
- MBTA crosstown bus routes
- MBTA Silver Line (formerly considered part of the key routes)
- Free public transport in Boston
