= Santa Ana Branch =

Railroad in California

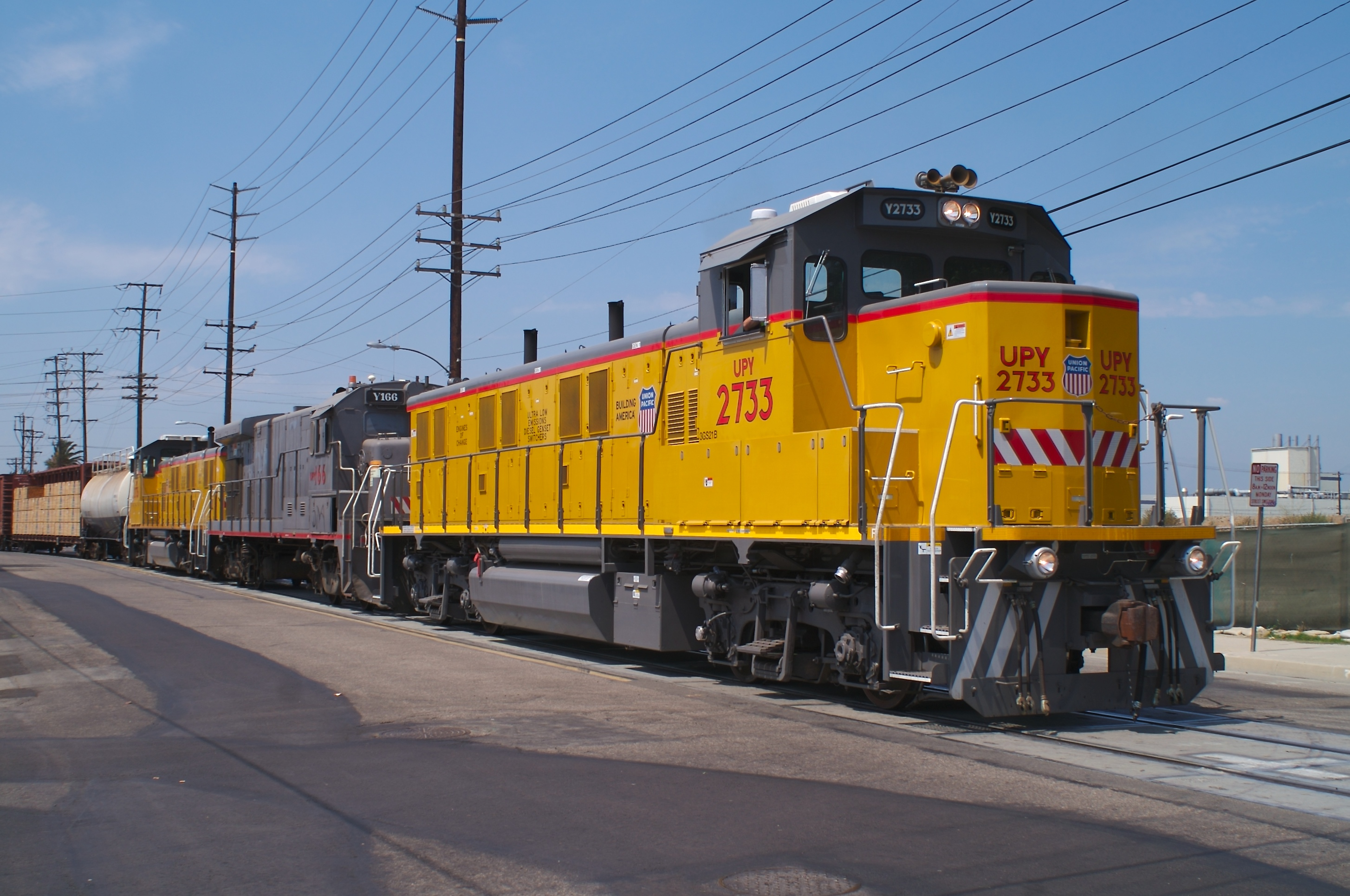
UPY 2733 street running on South Olive Street in Anaheim

The Santa Ana Branch is a Union Pacific railroad line in California, running between Los Angeles County and Orange County. The freight railroad connects the industrial areas of the Gateway Cities to the Surf Line and Alameda Corridor while facilitating further links to Huntington Beach and Costa Mesa. Union Pacific operates the line as several segments. The route is designated as the Patata Industrial Lead between the connection with the Alameda Corridor at Firestone and the junction with the Los Nietos Subdivision at Studebaker. The modern Santa Ana Industrial Branch continues southeast from Studebaker to the connection with the Surf Line near Anaheim Stadium. An additional segment south of Santa Ana runs along the Santa Ana and Newport Railway right of way as far as Dyer, where the tracks turn west to run along the former Pacific Electric Santa Ana–Huntington Beach Line into Costa Mesa.

== History ==
The route was established in 1874 when the Los Angeles and San Diego Railroad Company opened a new branch line from the Southern Pacific's recently purchased Los Angeles and San Pedro Railroad between Florence and Nietos (later renamed Downey). The intention was to build to San Diego. The line was completed to Anaheim on January 14, 1975. It was extended to Santa Ana in 1877. There was no other construction work done by this company and in 1888, it was consolidated with the Southern Pacific Railroad Company; the railroad would never reach San Diego. The Santa Ana and Newport Railway opened an independent line between Santa Ana and Newport Beach in 1898, which was absorbed into the Southern Pacific the following year. The street running segment along Santa Ana Street in Anaheim were established in 1899 as a spur for the Anaheim Orange & Lemon Association. The outer end of the original SP line between Santa Ana and the Stanton Branch was abandoned and the right of way reused for construction of the Santa Ana Freeway in the 1950s.
