= Mission Park station =

Light rail stop in Boston, Massachusetts, US

Mission Park
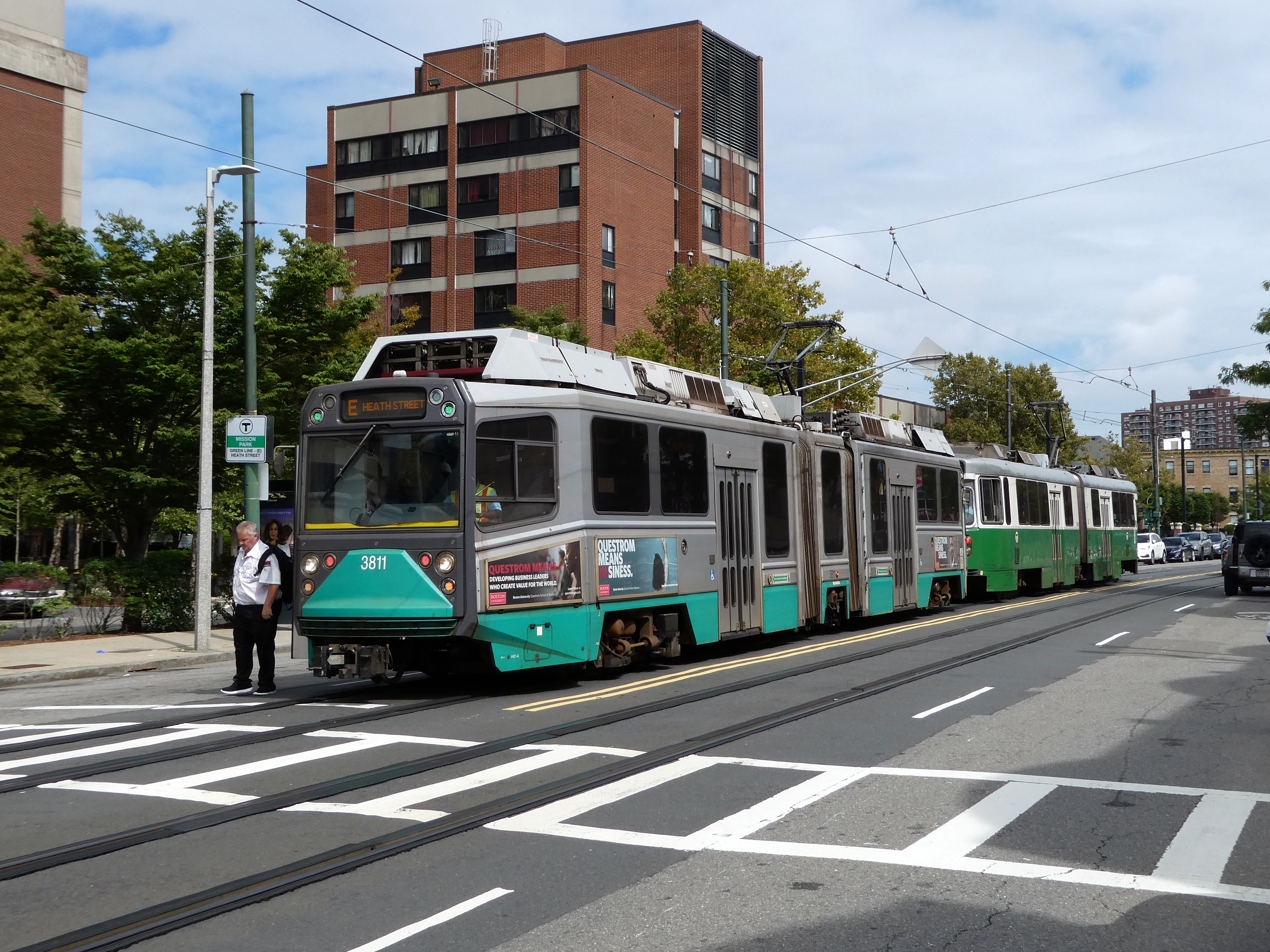
- An outbound train at Mission Park station in 2022

General information
- Location: Huntington Avenue at Mission Park; Boston, Massachusetts
- Coordinates: 42.3332°N 71.1095°W
- Platforms: None (passengers wait on sidewalk)
- Tracks: 2
- Connections: MBTA bus: 39, 66

Construction
- Accessible: No

History
- Rebuilt: 2028–2029 (planned)

Passengers
- 2011: 548 daily boardings

Services
| Preceding station | MBTA | Following station |
|---|---|---|
| Riverway toward Heath Street | Green Line E branch | Fenwood Road toward Medford/Tufts |
Location

Mission Park station is a light rail stop on the Green Line E branch of the MBTA subway system, located on Huntington Avenue in the Mission Hill neighborhood of Boston, Massachusetts. The station is located on a street running segment of the E branch; trains run in mixed traffic rather than a dedicated median. The station has no platforms; riders wait on the sidewalks (shared with bus stops for the route 39 and 66 buses) and cross the street to reach trains. Mission Park station is not accessible, a reconstruction for accessibility is planned in 2028–2029.

== Reconstruction ==
In 2021, the MBTA indicated plans to modify the Heath Street–Brigham Circle section of the E branch with accessible platforms to replace the existing non-accessible stopping locations. The new platforms are planned to be long enough to accommodate two 110-foot (34 m) Type 10 vehicles. Design work began in July 2023. In December 2024, the MBTA indicated that platforms would be built at Riverway and Mission Park, while Fenwood Road and Back of the Hill would be closed. As of October 2026, design work is expected to be completed in late 2027, with construction taking place in 2028–2029.
