= Huntington Beach–La Bolsa Line =

Pacific Electric streetcar line (1911–1928)

Huntington Beach–La Bolsa

Overview
- Owner: Southern Pacific
- Locale: Orange County, California
- Termini: La Bolsa; Huntington Beach

Service
- Type: Interurban
- System: Pacific Electric
- Operator(s): Pacific Electric

History
- Opened: February 1911
- Closed: November 9, 1928

Technical
- Line length: 1.7 mi (2.7 km)
- Track gauge: 1,435 mm (4 ft 8 1/2 in) standard gauge
- Electrification: Overhead line, 600 V DC

The Santa Ana–Huntington Beach Line is a former Pacific Electric interurban railway line in Orange County, California. A single car provided a suburban service between Huntington Beach and the sugar refineries in La Bolsa.

== History ==
The railway route served as a Southern Pacific steam railway line prior to 1911, when the section between Huntington Beach and La Bolsa was electrified by the Pacific Electric. Passenger service began that February and was utilized by workers at three sugar refineries at La Bolsa. The refineries closed starting in 1923, greatly reducing passenger demand on the line. Service was discontinued after November 9, 1928.

== Freight ==
The sugar refineries were a large source of freight revenue for the line. Traffic continued into the 1950s, long outlasting passenger service.
