= Street running train =

Routing of a railroad track directly on public streets

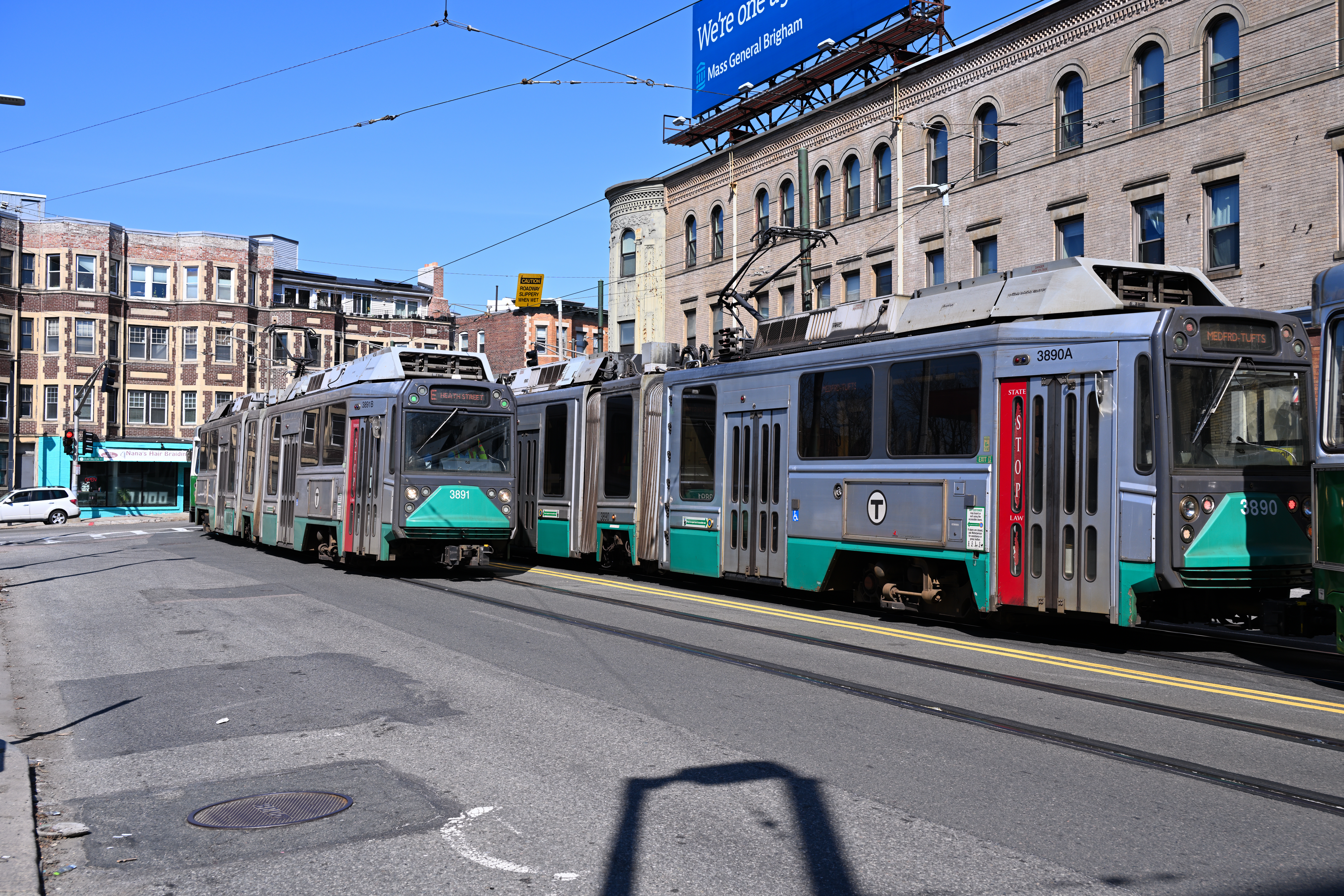
Green Line E branch trains street-running along Huntington Avenue at Riverway station in Boston in 2025

A street-running train is a train that runs on a track built on public streets. The rails are embedded in the roadway, and the train shares the street with other users, such as pedestrians, cars and cyclists, thus often being referred to as running in mixed traffic.

Trams and, less frequently, light rail trains run on streets.

Street-running trains travel more slowly than trains on dedicated rights-of-way and can be delayed by motor vehicles. Stations on such routes are rare and may appear similar in style to a tram stop, but often lack platforms, pedestrian islands, or other amenities. In some cases, passengers may wait on a distant sidewalk, then board or disembark by crossing the traffic.

== Examples ==
The following list is non-inclusive of tram and light rail systems and is otherwise non-exhaustive.

=== Argentina ===
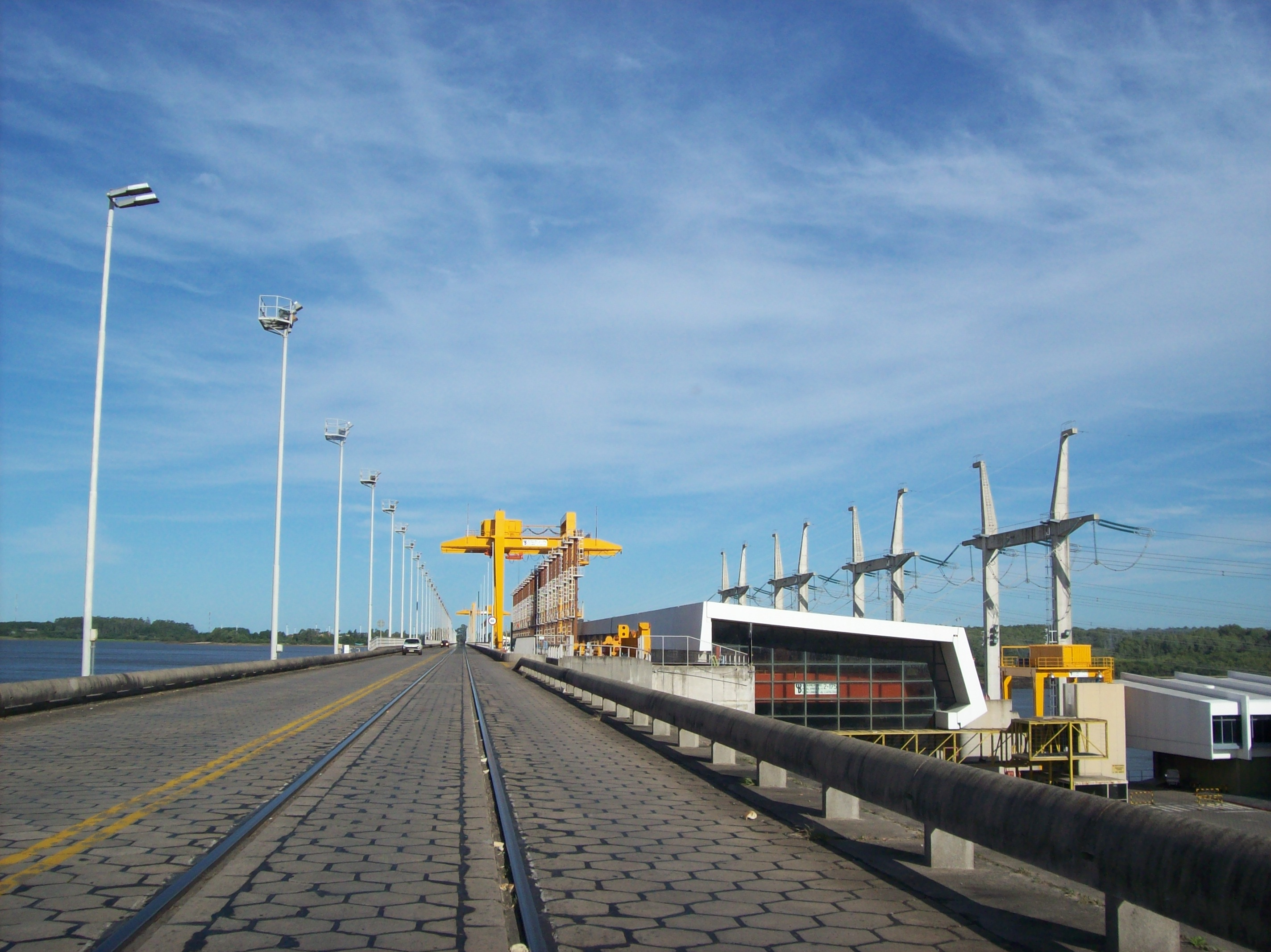
Salto Grande Bridge over the dam

- Buenos Aires: in the past, street-running trains ran through the city streets. Trains run by Villa 21-24.

=== Australia ===
Operational instances:

- Maryborough, Queensland: Kent Street 610mm gauge
- Mossman, Queensland: A narrow-gauge sugar-cane railway runs down Mill Street.
- Rockhampton, Queensland: The North Coast main line runs down Denison Street, double track line singled in 1996. (Note: Street running railroad on Denison Street in Rockhampton, Queensland 23.376492°S 150.507336°E)
- Wycheproof, Victoria: The Sea Lake railway line runs down the wide median strip of the town's main street.

Historical instances:

- Nambour, Queensland: The Moreton Central Sugar Mill Cane Tramway ran down Mill Street, was also street running on a bridge at Bli Bli, closed 2003. The rails in the street remained in place and a tourist tram is planned on it.
- Port Pirie, South Australia: The Adelaide-Port Augusta railway line ran down the centre of Ellen Street until 1967.
- Yass, New South Wales: The Yass Tramway from Yass Junction to Yass Town ran down Dutton Street, closed 1988. The route is no longer connected, but the tracks in Dutton Street and by the station are still present and are on the heritage list.

=== Canada ===
Notable examples in Canada include:

- Port Hope, Ontario: from Walton Street, along Ontario Street to the Ganaraska River, where it split off and followed the river north out of the city limits, eventually reaching Midland, Ontario with a branch line to Peterborough, Ontario. Lots of railway facilities still exist. The old station is opposite the corner of Walton Street and Ontario, with the old station master's office just south of that along Lent Lane, which is the old track bed.
- Oshawa, Ontario: from Michael Starr trail (near Court Street) along Bruce Street, east to Ritson Road, then north on Ritson Road to the GM North Plant. (removed)
- Brantford, Ontario: right turn lane of Clarence Street at Colborne Street (formerly Canadian National Railway; now Southern Ontario Railway, still in use)
- St. Catharines, Ontario:
  - Ontario Street (removed) (to the disappeared car factory) (continues to Louisa St.) (diagonal between the houses) (former track partly still visible from the air)
  - Louisa Street (From just east of Thomas Street to Catherine Street, Canadian National Railway, originally Niagara St. Catharines Toronto Railway. Electric radial (interurban) (branch from Port Dalhousie-west) (until 1959) removed, continues to Welland Avenue below)
  - Welland Avenue (From Francis Street to Balfour Street, removed) (continues to Niagara St.)
  - Raymond Street (depot only)
  - Niagara Street (continues to Facer St.)
  - Facer Street (branch to Niagara-on-the-Lake)
  - Electric radial (interurban) network to Port Dalhousie-west, Port Dalhousie-east, Niagara-on-the-Lake, Port Colborne, and Niagara Falls. All tracks on the streets are removed in all places, except(?) Pine Street in Thorold. Freight trains with diesel engines on the streets only from 1959 to the closing in about 2005.
  - St. Catharines was the centre of the Niagara St. Catharines Toronto Railway.
- Waterloo, Ontario: Caroline Street from Erb Street West to Allen Street West, CP Rail tracks removed in 1994. Later reinstalled for ION light rail, in service again as of 2019. The former railway is now a trail.

=== Croatia ===
- Rijeka, freight trains (and occasional passenger trains) run from western to eastern cargo terminal of Port of Rijeka through the city centre.

=== Czechia ===
- Brno: the railway line that connects Brno Exhibition Centre and mainline runs about two km (1.2 mi). along Poříčí street. Touristic (steam) trains run on the Highway, with police escorts. The line was abandoned in 2022.

=== Germany ===
For tramways the legal separation of a street running trackbed and an exclusive trackbed in urban traffic is given in § 16 BOStrab tramway regulations. Germany has some street-running railways:

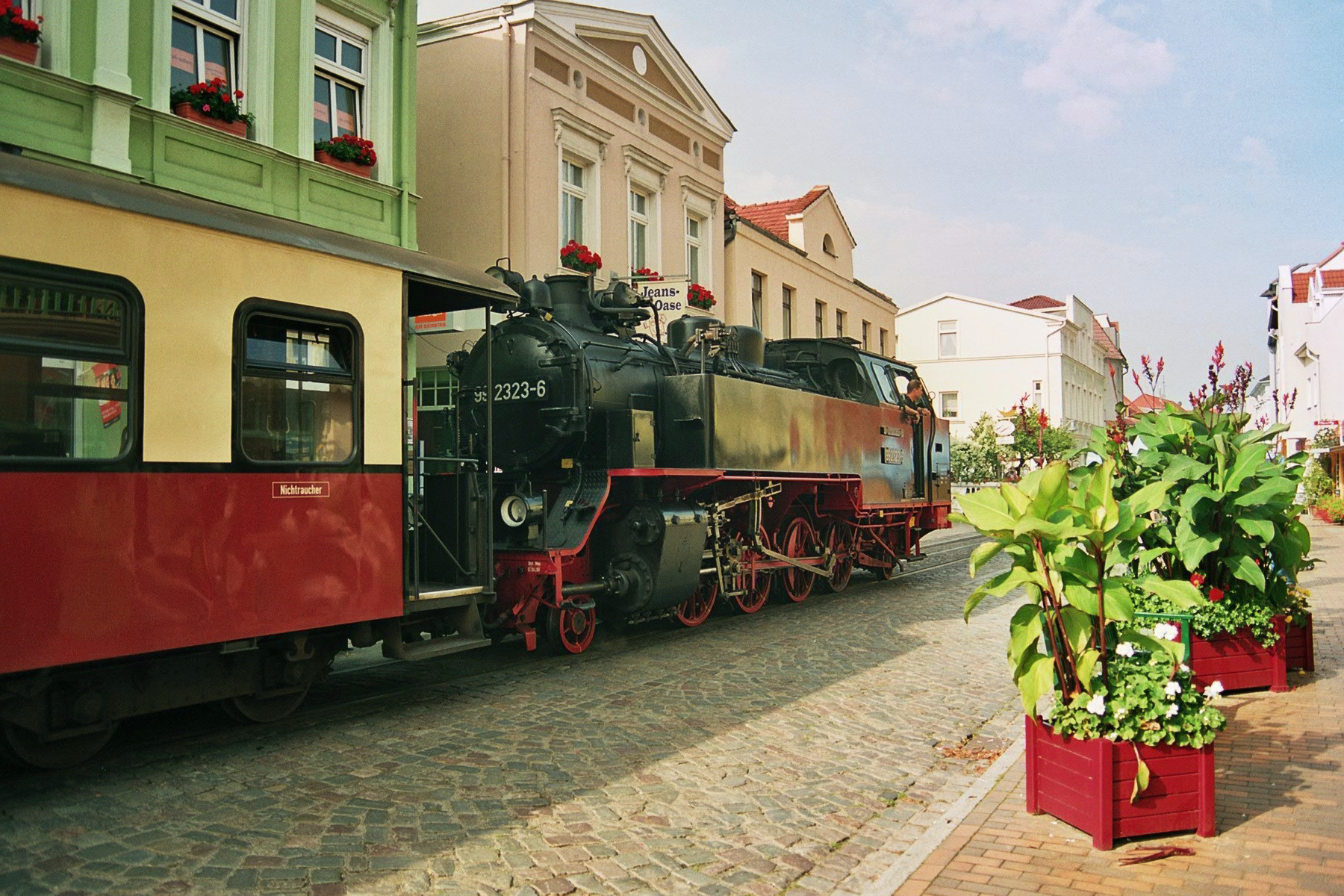
A "Mollibahn" train running through Bad Doberan, Germany

- A freight branch of the Main-Neckar Railway features some street running sections in Darmstadt. The line is no longer in regular use, but a short dual gauge section (Kirschen Allee)(Evonik) was until 2015 connected to the metre gauge Darmstadt tram network allowed old trams to be loaded onto mainline vehicles for export.
- The access track that connects the mainline to Bombardier factory in Bautzen passes through a short section of street running at Fabrikstrasse.

=== Hong Kong ===
The KCR British Section had two street running stretches: a spur line to Whampoa Dockyard through Baker Street, another across Salisbury Road and Canton Road to the Kowloon Godowns.

=== Indonesia ===
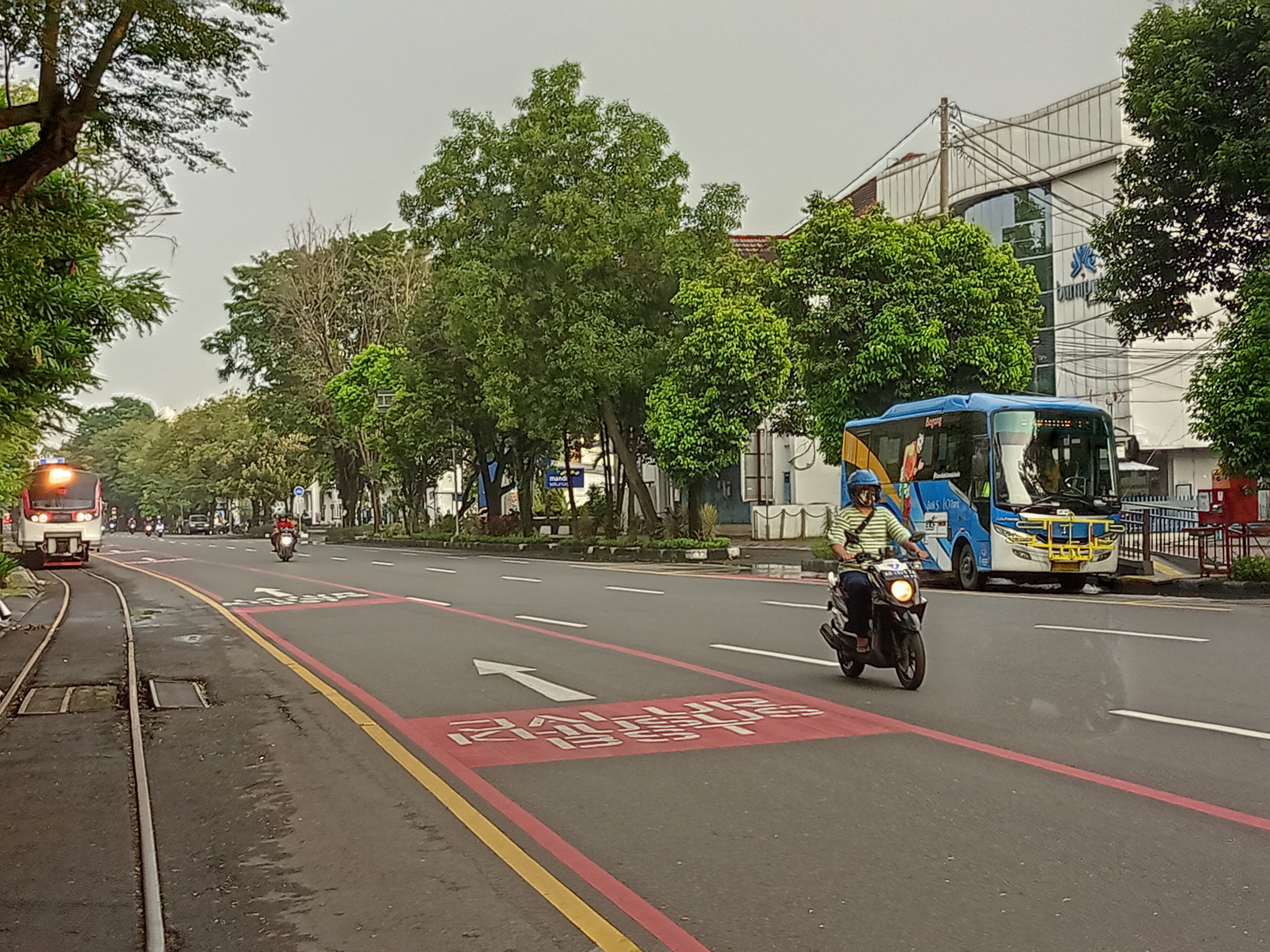
Train along Jalan Slamet Riyadi, Solo, Indonesia

Historically, Indonesia used to have many street running lines. Those were mostly found on the rural tramlines in Java. The former network of smaller railway companies, such as Samarang–Joana Stoomtram Maatschappij, Oost-Java Stoomtram Maatschappij, Serajoedal Stoomtram Maatschappij, or rural branchline of the major company like Staatsspoorwegen were often built next to the main road to save cost and later became street running when the road widened.

By the late 1970s, the majority of them were closed. The last of the classic street running line that saw operation was the Madiun-Ponorogo branchline which closed around 1984.

Only three of them survive in the present day:

- Madiun, East Java. The Pertamina branch line which passes the Jalan Yos Sudarso in front of INKA factory. The line branched off to the west of Madiun railway station, where the train need to reverse to its destination 500 meters down the road.
- Malang, East Java. The Pertamina branch line which diverges from Malang Kotalama station. The short street running section runs to the east of Jalan Halmahera, between the junction with Jalan Tanimbar and Jalan Bingkil.
- Surakarta, Central Java: The Solo Purwosari to Wonogiri line runs along Jalan Slamet Riyadi through the center of Surakarta. The Batara Kresna Railbus service between Solo Purwosari and Wonogiri, operates along the line, with two trips in each direction. A special charter-only tourist steam train called the Sepur Kluthuk Jaladara also runs along this stretch of the line between Solo Purwosari and Solo Kota stations.

=== Ireland ===
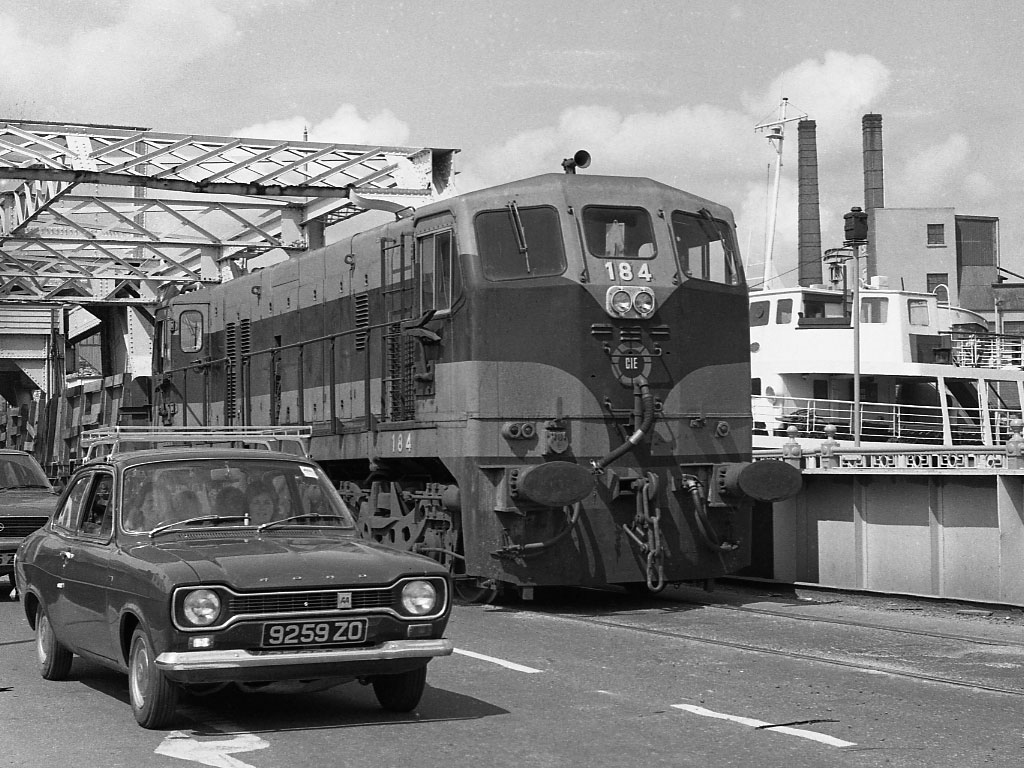
Train and road traffic on Clontarf Bridge, Cork in 1975

- Cork City Railways from 1911 had street-running goods trains between Albert Quay station and Glanmire Road station, authorised by the local act of Parliament incorporating the railway. The stations were on opposite sides of the River Lee, which the railway crossed via two bridges shared with road traffic. The rail speed limit was 5 miles per hour (8.0 km/h). The line was closed in 1976 because of the increase in road traffic.

=== Italy ===
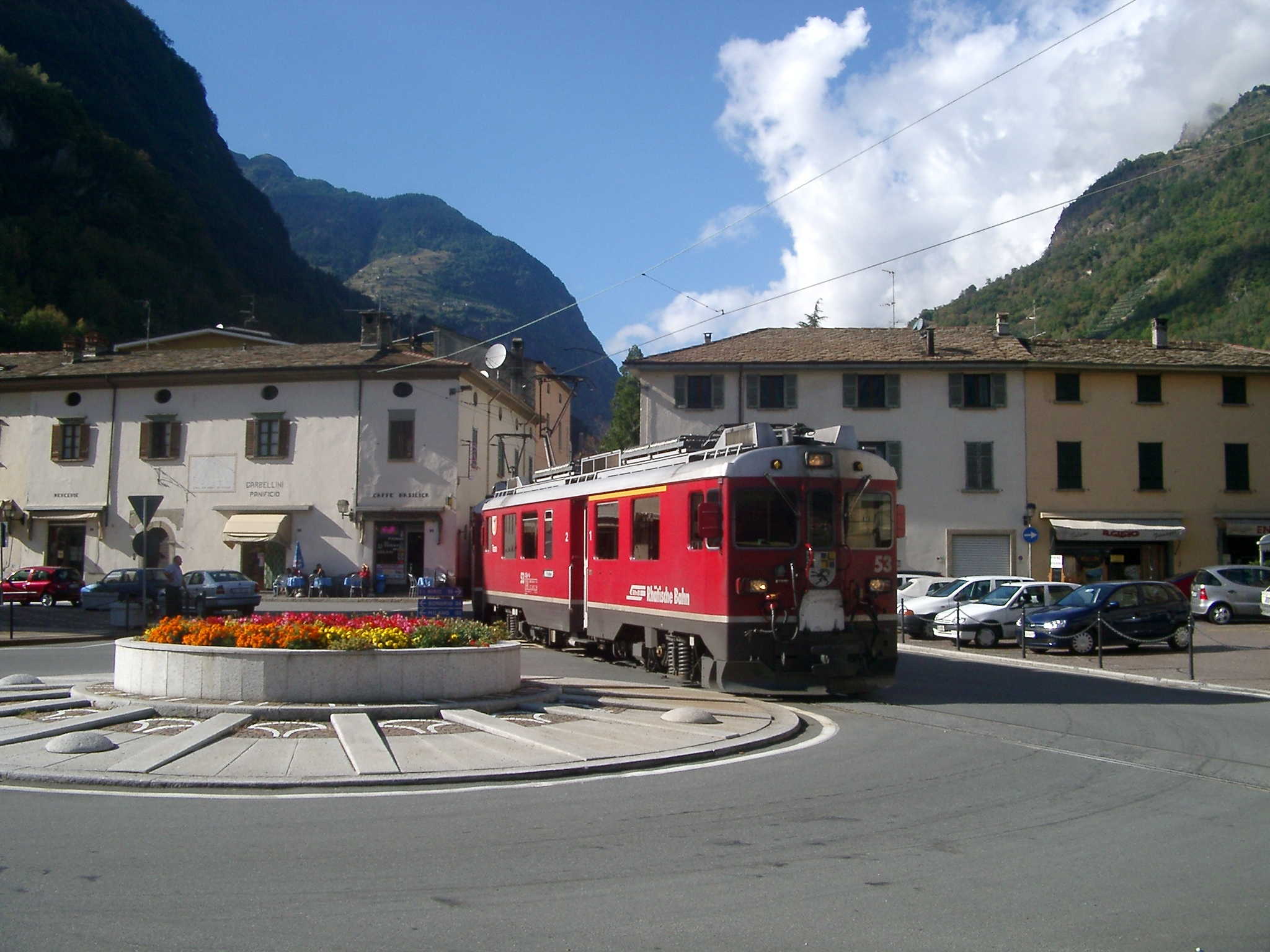
A Berninabahn train crossing the main square in Tirano

- Genoa–Casella railway in Casella
- Bernina railway line in Tirano
- Ferrovia Circumetnea in Catania (discontinued in 1999)

=== Japan ===
- The Keihan Keishin, Enoden Enoshima, and Ishiyama-Sakamoto lines have street running sections.

=== Laos ===
- The rail link across the Thai–Lao Friendship Bridge over the Mekong River between Thailand and Laos is shared-use, although road traffic stops while trains cross the bridge.

=== New Zealand ===
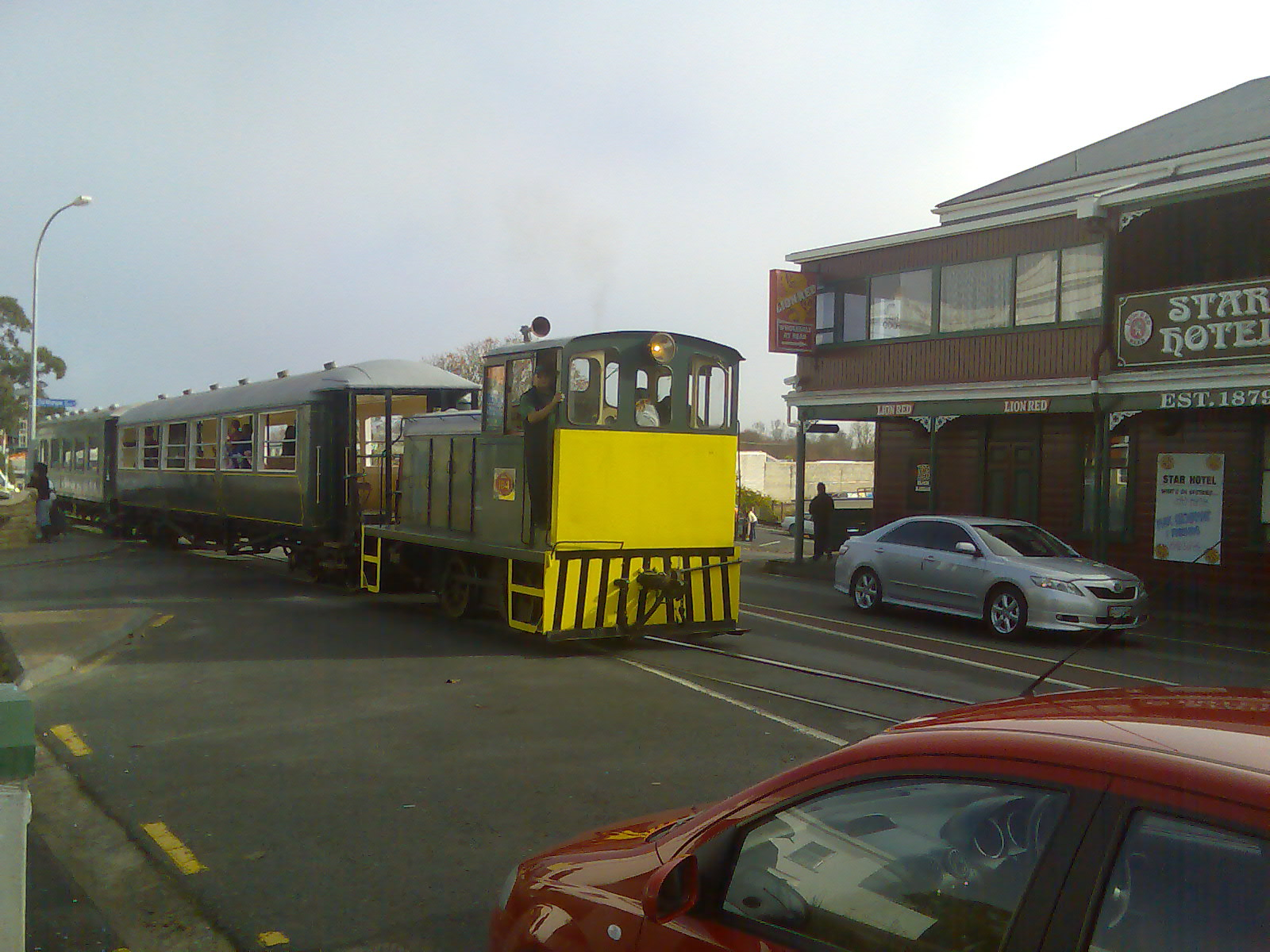
Street running in Kawakawa

- Kawakawa : The Bay of Islands Vintage Railway, part of the former Opua Branch of the New Zealand Railways, runs down the middle of State Highway 1 in the centre of Kawakawa.
- Hindon : The Taieri Gorge Railway, part of the former Otago Central Railway runs down the middle of a one-lane road bridge in Hindon. These tourist passenger trains have the right of way, with only signs warning motorists of trains.

=== Poland ===
- Kołobrzeg : The Port of Kołobrzeg has railway access through approximately 750 meters of street-running tracks. The route sees semi-regular freight traffic, along with a yearly passenger excursion.
- Luboń : An industrial track connects to the Wrocław-Poznań mainline to a fertilizer factory owned by Luvena S.A. in Luboń. It runs 180 meters through the Romana Maya street along with the 66-meter road bridge on the old riverbeds of the Warta River. The industrial track was built in 1907 along with the bridge, factory and the river port while the town was under German rule. The bridge parts from the 86-meter bridge were built by the royal steelworks in Chorzów, with individual parts being connected with rivets. The bridge was refurbished and repaired throughout the years until Luvena decided to replace it with the newer wider bridge made by Gotowski BKiP Sp. z o.o. from Bydgoszcz that got replaced in 2014.

=== Switzerland ===
Swiss law does not distinguish between trams and railways, making the distinction between street running by trams and that by railways legally indistinct. In many places, passenger trains run on the streets because there is no room for their own track.

- Zürich : 1,000-tonne (980-long-ton; 1,100-short-ton) grain trains make up to 4 journeys a day between Bahnhof Hardbrücke and the Swissmill Tower on Sihlquai, following a 2-kilometre (1.2 mi) route along Zahnradstrasse, Hardstrasse and Zöllystrasse, including a tram crossing. The driver controls traffic lights manually.

=== United Kingdom ===
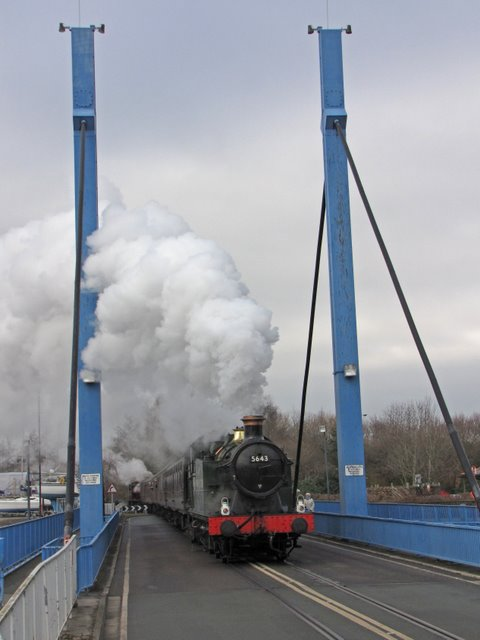
The combined road and rail swing bridge at Preston Marina

Street running railways have been much rarer in the United Kingdom than elsewhere. This is due to 19th-century laws requiring railways to be enclosed by fences, which had the consequence that railways could not be built along existing roads and had to use their own rights of way. In cases where street running was unavoidable, the roads were often legally treated as level crossings with trains and road vehicles not permitted to use them at the same time. Some examples are:

- Weymouth: The most notable street running track was the Weymouth Harbour Tramway (despite the name, it was never used for trams and was a heavy-rail route); however this ended service to regular traffic since 1987, and to all traffic since 1999, with track removal starting in 2020.
- Porthmadog: The Porthmadog cross town link links the narrow-gauge Welsh Highland and Ffestiniog railways and includes 50 metres of street running over the Britannia Bridge in Porthmadog. The section that runs along a street is closed to road traffic by alternating red stop lights, as if it were an extended level crossing.
- Trafford Park: The Trafford Park Railway was a freight-only street-running railway network was through Trafford Park; only one section alongside Barton Dock Road has seen use in recent years. This branch is abandoned and partially removed.
- Preston: The heritage Ribble Steam Railway runs across a swing bridge at the entrance to Preston Marina. The bridge is used by both road and rail traffic, but closed by barriers to road traffic when a train is crossing.
- Fivemiletown and Caledon, County Tyrone in Northern Ireland: the narrow gauge Clogher Valley Railway (closed 1942) had street running through both of these villages.

=== United States ===
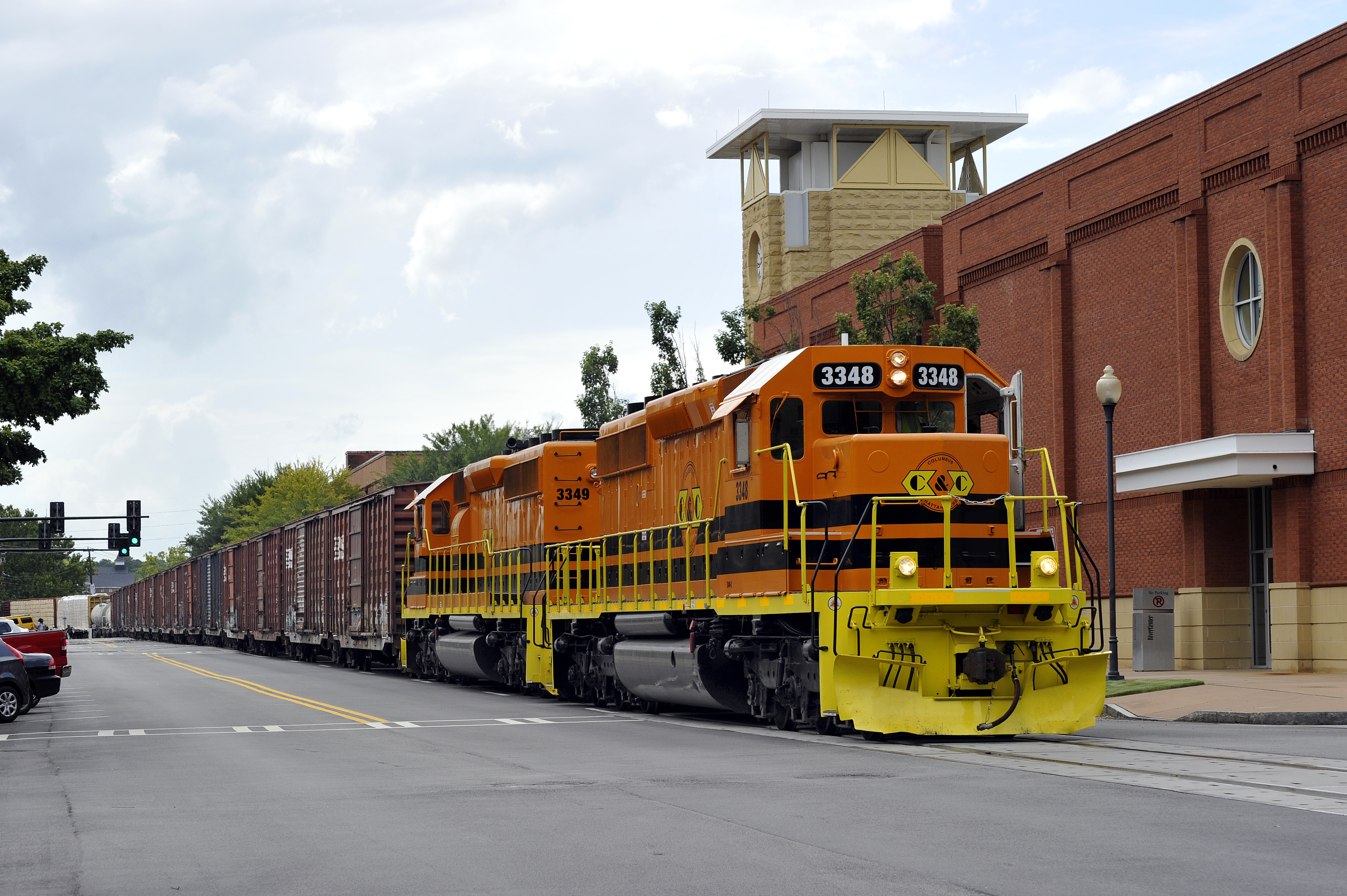
Columbus & Chattahoochee Railroad running on 9th Street in downtown Columbus, Georgia

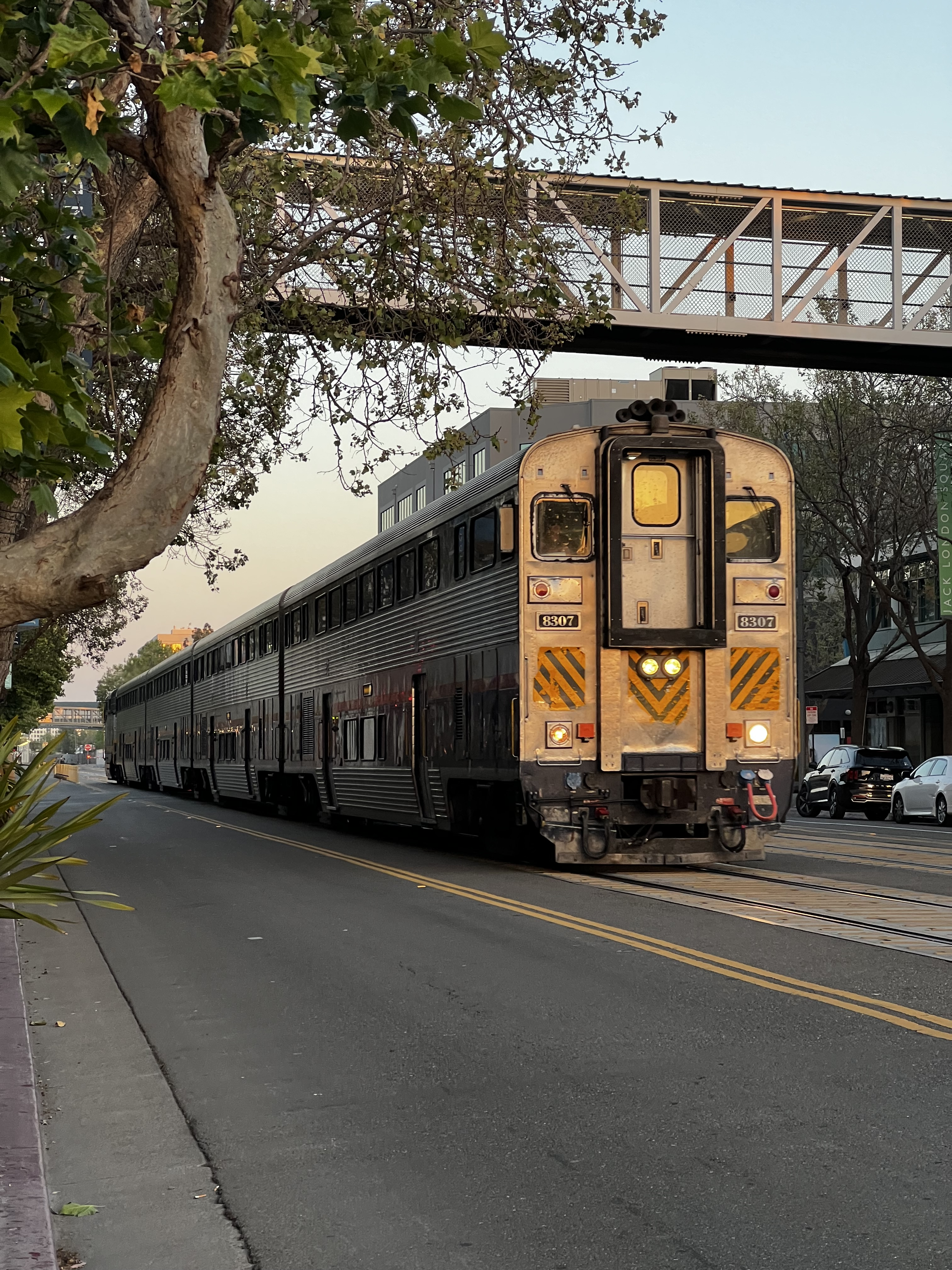
An Amtrak train running through Jack London Square in Oakland, California

A selection of the many examples:

==== Alabama ====
- Gadsden: Locust Street, between N1 Street and N6 Street.

==== Alaska ====
- Anton Anderson Memorial Tunnel: A 2.5-mile (4.0 km) one-lane tunnel.
- Skagway: Unofficial government allows railroad tracks up Broadway in 1898. They were shifted in 1947.

==== California ====
- Anaheim: Santa Ana Street — Union Pacific Santa Ana Branch
- Oakland: Embarcadero West, Union Pacific Niles Subdivision between Martin Luther King Jr. Way and Webster Street; the only double street running train track in the USA; the only Amtrak street running trackage in the USA; freight trains also run here; third track is no longer in use.

==== Colorado ====
- Fort Collins: Mason Street. This railway opened in 1877, but 100 years later the city wanted the line diverted around the city. Instead, the train was given a free lane in the street. One train can be 5 km. long, waiting times for other traffic can be up to 30 minutes, and each train must use the horn more than 40 times within three minutes.

==== Florida ====
- Clearwater: N East Ave.
- Tampa: E Polk street.

==== Illinois ====
- Rockford: Madison Street.

==== Indiana ====
- Terre Haute: 1st Street CSX (ex New York Central)
- Elwood: 4 blocks of C Street Norfolk Southern
- Warsaw: 2 blocks of Hickory Street Norfolk Southern

==== Iowa ====
- Bellevue

==== Kansas ====
- Salina: 4th Street - Union Pacific operates an industrial branch line which runs within the 4th Street right-of-way

==== Kentucky ====
- La Grange: CSX mainline Main Street - Oldham County Courthouse Square.

==== Louisiana ====
- Gretna: Madison Street.

==== Massachusetts ====
- Boston: Union Freight Railroad, running along Atlantic Avenue (demolished after 1970)
- Holyoke: Holyoke and Westfield Railroad, branch running along Water Street in use, other lines demolished or separated.

==== Minnesota ====
- International Falls: Fort Frances–International Falls International Bridge connects to Fort Frances, Ontario, Canada. There is no connection to the Canadian rail network through this bridge. No trains use the bridge since the paper mill closed in 2014. The municipality is still hoping the mill will be purchased by another company.
- Shakopee: 2nd Avenue East and West, Union Pacific Railroad main line of the Mankato Subdivision still in use, former Chicago and Northwestern Railway (Omaha Road)

==== Missouri ====
- St. Louis: 2nd Street Manufacturers Railway

==== New Jersey ====
- Garfield: Monroe Street. Abandoned in 2020.

==== New York ====
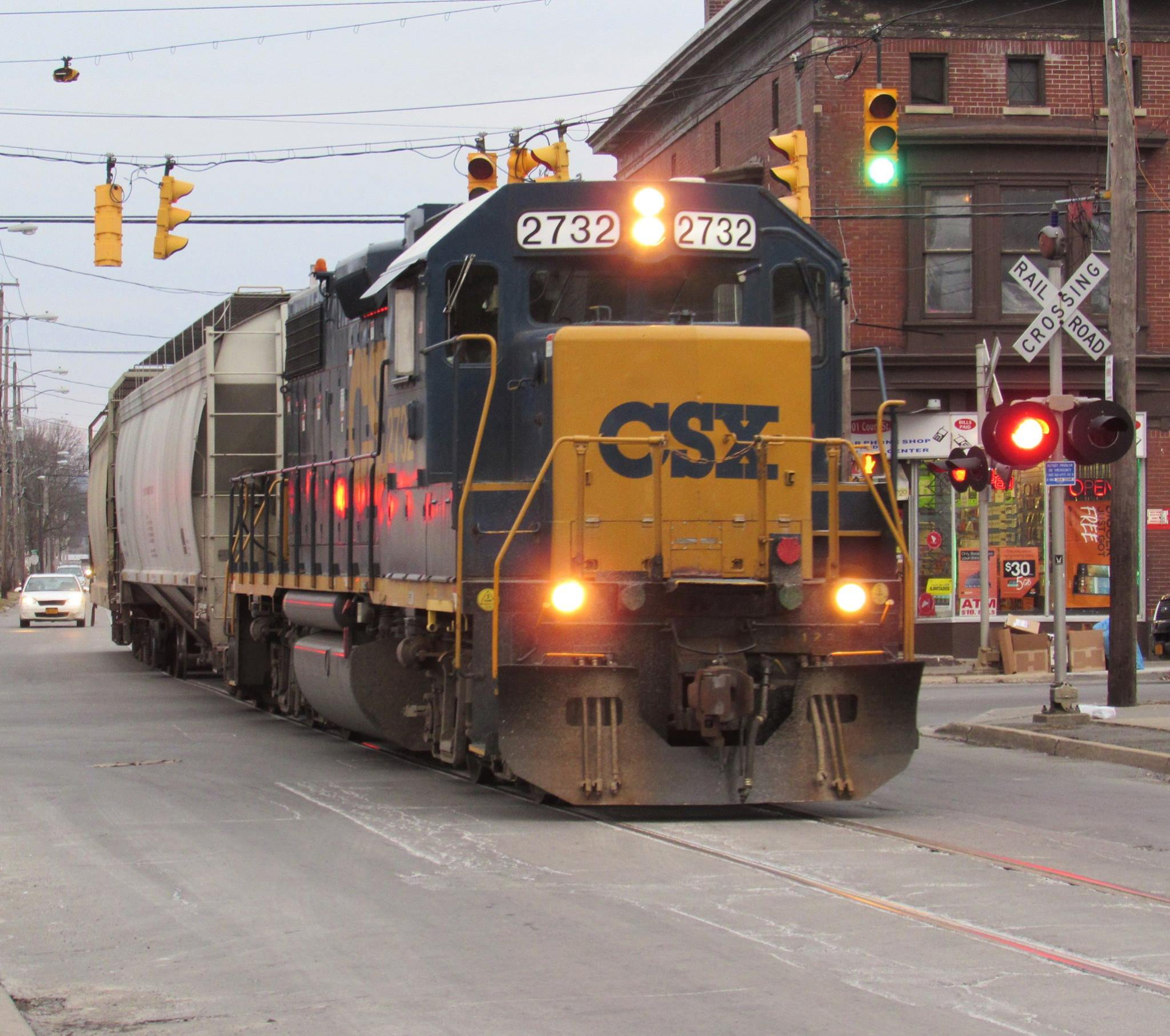
NYSW train with a CSX GP38-2 locomotive in Utica, New York.

- Utica: Schuyler Street, operated by the New York, Susquehanna and Western Railway.

==== North Carolina ====
- Fayetteville: Hillsboro St.

==== Oregon ====
- Hillsboro: Adams Street
- Salem: Front Street NE.

==== Pennsylvania ====
- Erie: The Nickel Plate Railroad laid tracks on East 19th Street in 1882 despite community pushback. The tracks were abandoned in 2001.
- Uniontown: Beeson Blvd from West Penn St. to Library Pl. - Southwest Pennsylvania Railroad, trackage abandoned 2016)
- West Brownsville: Main Street.

==== Tennessee ====
- Paris: N Fentress St.-S Caldwell-McNeil St.

==== Texas ====
- San Antonio:
  - N Comal St. - San Antonio and Aransas Pass Railway, then Southern Pacific, then Union Pacific. Removed and bypassed in 2005.
  - Jones Ave. and Emma Koehler - Texas Transportation Company, electric trolley freight railway, most tracks removed 2002.

==== Virginia ====
- Richmond: On a street without a name under the Triple Railroad Bridge Crossing.

==== Washington ====
- Renton: Tracks in the middle of Houser Way S are used by several businesses, including delivery of Boeing 737 airliner fuselages to the Boeing Renton Factory.

==== West Virginia ====
- St. Marys: 2nd. Street.

=== Vietnam ===
While the Vietnamese railway network has many level crossings, street running trains in Vietnam are rare. One example is the branch line between Dĩ An station and Dĩ An train workshop, which has a few street running sections in small neighborhoods.

== See also ==
- Green track
- Level crossing
- List of road-rail bridges
- List of road-rail tunnels
- Reserved track, where vehicles have a separate right of way (typically used in a tram transport context)
- Tramway track
