= List of road–rail tunnels =

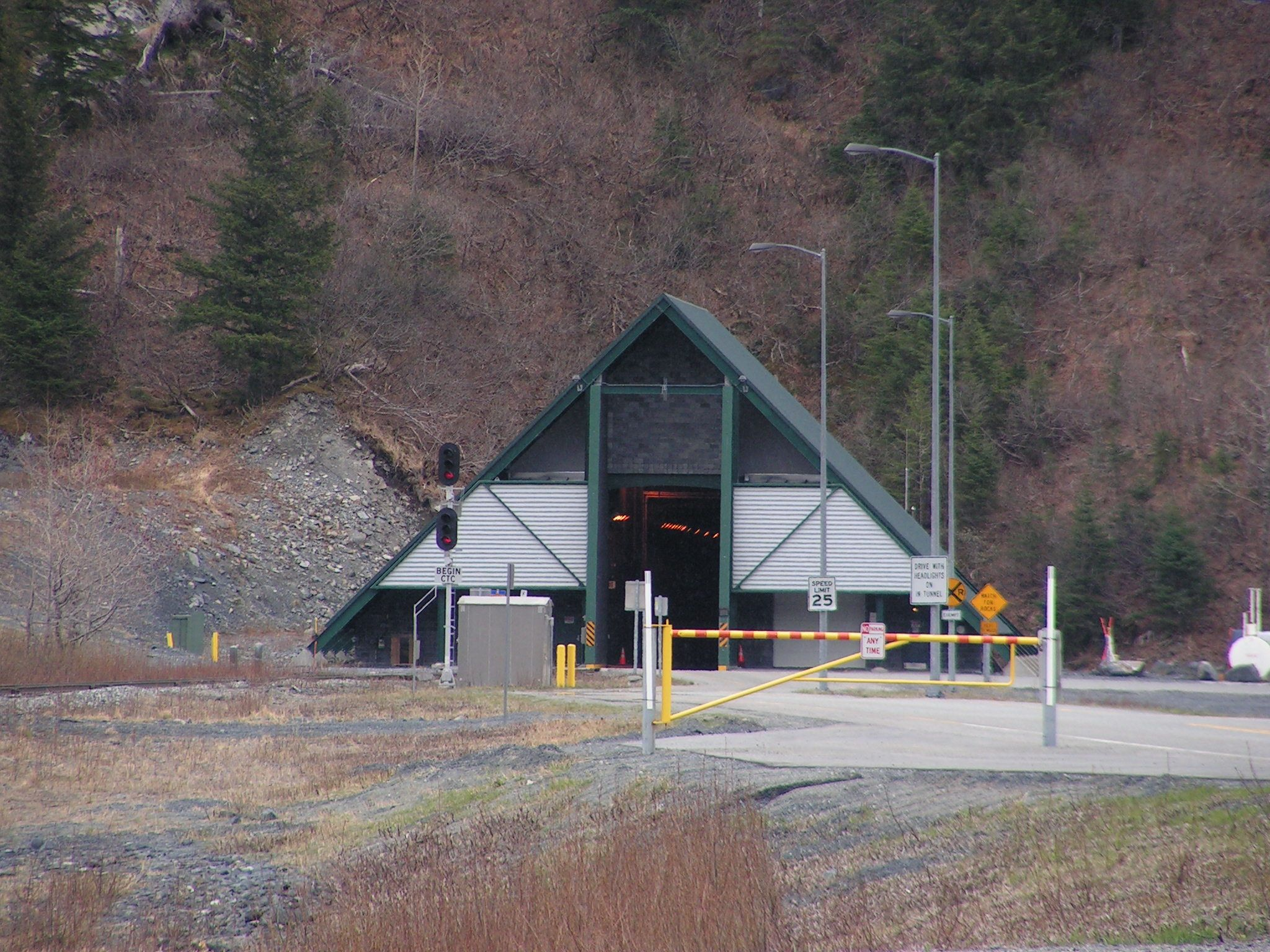
Anton Anderson Memorial Tunnel (west entrance), near Whittier, Alaska.

Road–rail tunnels are tunnels shared by road and rail lines, as an economy measure compared to constructing segregated tunnels. Road and rail may be provided with separate tubes.

== Argentina ==
- Transandine Railway rail tunnel, converted to road use for time being, albeit single lane.

== China ==
- Jiangyin Jingjiang Yangtze River Tunnel (under construction), S229 and Xicheng Intercity Rail Transit
- Shanghai Yangtze River Parallel Tunnel, Shanghai Metro Chongming line and 4-lane road.
- Wuhan Yangtze River road-railway Tunnel (Line 7 and Sanyang road-Qinyuan road), the first road-rail tunnel of Yangtze River built by tunnel-borning machine.

== Denmark ==
- Oresund Bridge (tunnel directly linked to a bridge)
- Fehmarn Belt Tunnel – construction began 2021

== Egypt ==
- Proposed road-rail tunnel under Suez Canal

== France ==
- Montets tunnel, single tube shared by road and railway (used by road vehicles only when the pass road is closed because of snow)

== Germany ==
- Fehmarn Sound tunnel, completion planned for 2028

== Hong Kong ==
- Eastern Harbour Crossing

== Netherlands ==
- Velsertunnel

== Turkey ==
- Great Istanbul Tunnel (proposed in 2015)

== United States ==
- Anton Anderson Memorial Tunnel, Alaska
- Downtown Seattle Transit Tunnel, Washington (until 2019)
- Mount Washington Transit Tunnel, Pennsylvania

== See also ==
- List of road–rail bridges
