= Back of the Hill station =

Light rail station in Boston, Massachusetts, US

Back of the Hill
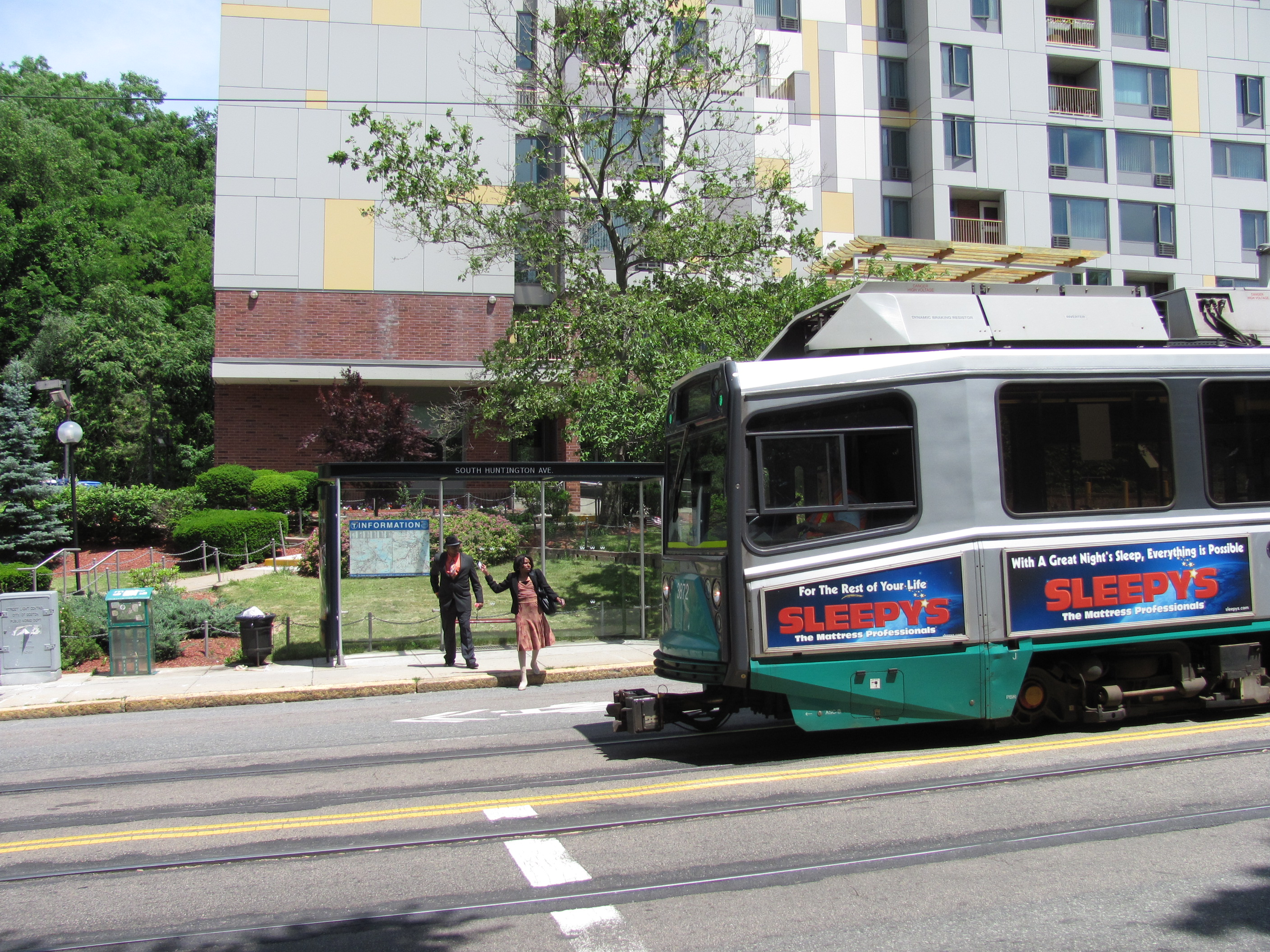
- An inbound train at Back of the Hill station in 2011

General information
- Location: South Huntington Avenue at Back of the Hill; Boston, Massachusetts
- Coordinates: 42.32926°N 71.11093°W
- Platforms: None (passengers wait on sidewalk)
- Tracks: 2
- Connections: MBTA bus: 39

Construction
- Accessible: No

History
- Opened: c. 1982
- Closed: Late 2020s (planned)

Passengers
- 2011: 35 daily boardings

Services
Preceding station	MBTA	Following station
Heath Street Terminus	Green Line E branch	Riverway toward Medford/Tufts
Location

Back of the Hill station is a light rail stop on the Green Line E branch of the MBTA subway system, located in the Mission Hill neighborhood of Boston, Massachusetts. It is named after, and primarily serves, the adjacent Back of the Hill apartment complex, a Section 8 development for elderly and disabled residents. Back of the Hill is located on the street running section of the E branch on South Huntington Avenue. The station has no platforms; passengers wait in bus shelters (shared with route 39 buses) on the sidewalks and cross a traffic lane to reach Green Line trains. The stop is not accessible. The MBTA plans to close Back of the Hill by late 2029 as part of renovations to nearby Heath Street station.

== History ==
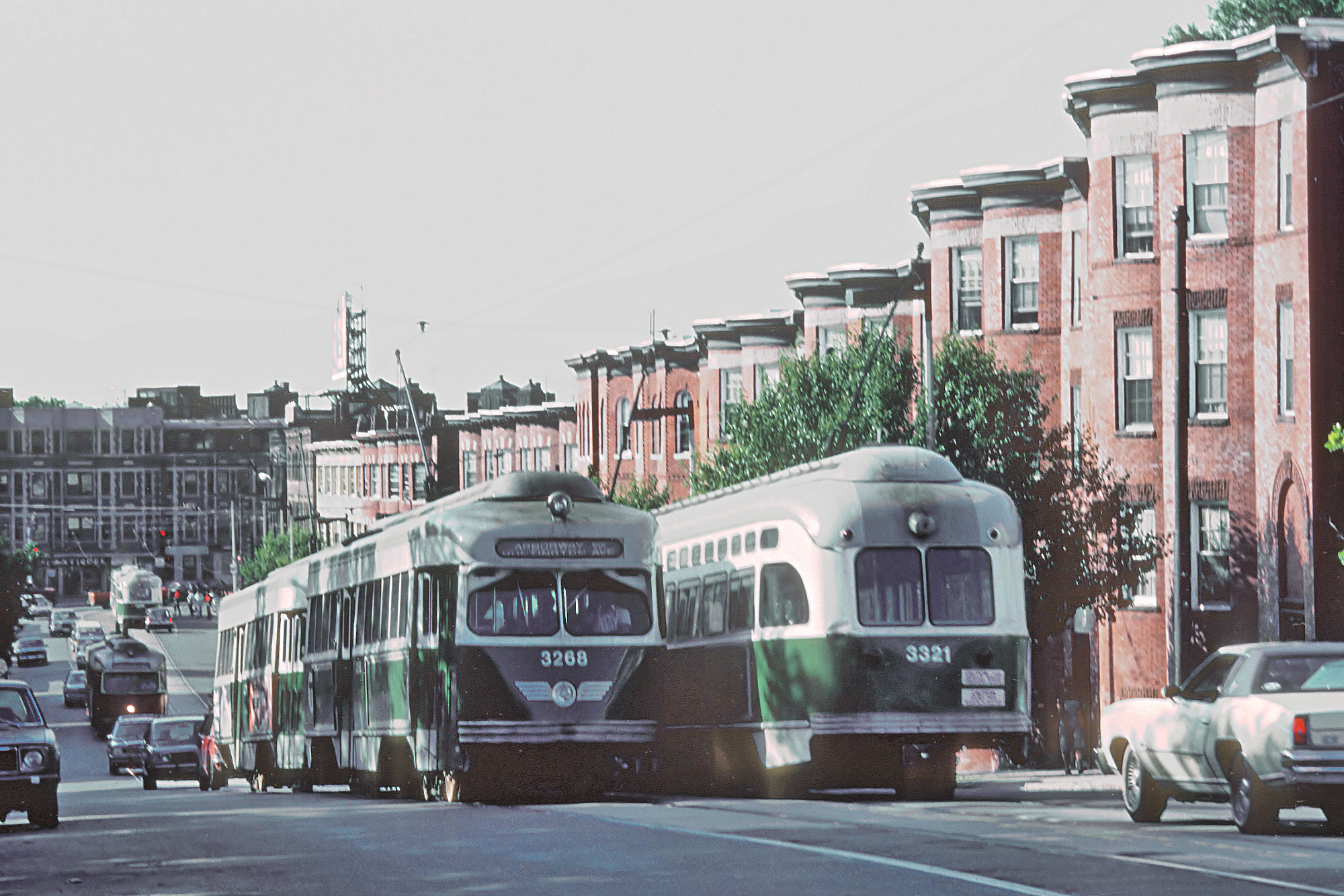
Two trains at Back of the Hill in 1983

The Boston Elevated Railway opened streetcar tracks on the newly-laid-out South Huntington Avenue between Centre Street and Huntington Avenue on May 11, 1903. The company began Jamaica Plain–Park Street service via South, Centre, South Huntington, and Huntington as a branch of existing Boston–Brookline service on Huntington Avenue. All Huntington Avenue service (except for Northeastern University and Brigham Circle short turns) operated on South Huntington after September 10, 1938. The line became part of the Metropolitan Transit Authority in 1947, and part of the Massachusetts Bay Transportation Authority (MBTA) in 1967; it was designated as the E Branch of the MBTA Green Line in 1967.

By the 1970s, E Branch trains stopped at Riverway and Heath Street, with no stop between them. The Back of the Hill apartment complex, located just north of Heath Street, was built in 1980 and opened in 1981. The E Branch was closed for track work from June 21, 1980, to June 26, 1982; trains began stopping at Back of the Hill then or after.

Back of the Hill is the least-used stop on the MBTA subway system, averaging only 35 riders per day by a 2011 count. It was one of only four stops to average fewer than 100 riders per day. (Note: The others, as of 2014, are Valley Road (44 riders/day), Capen Street (58 riders/day), and Cedar Grove (91 riders/day), all on the Mattapan Line.) In 2021, the MBTA indicated plans to modify the Heath Street–Brigham Circle section of the E branch with accessible platforms to replace the existing non-accessible stopping locations. Design work for the project began in July 2023. In December 2024, the MBTA indicated plans to close the Back of the Hill stop due to its proximity to Heath Street and the difficulty of building platforms at the site. As of October 2026, design work is expected to be completed in late 2027, with construction taking place in 2028–2029.
