= List of tenants in the Prudential Center =

Prudential Tower
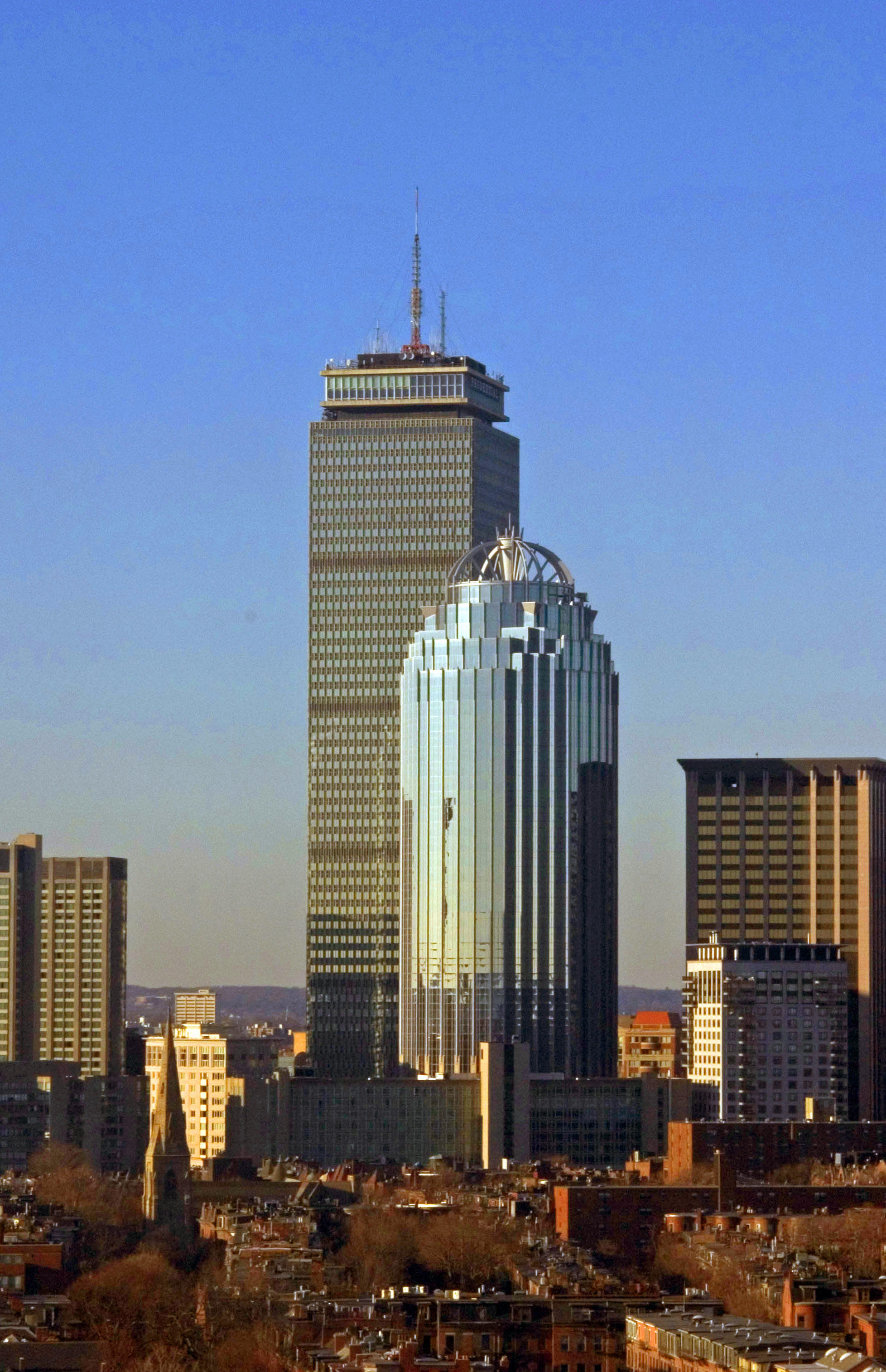
- The Prudential Tower behind 111 Huntington Avenue, as seen from the South End
- Alternative names: The Pru; Prudential Tower; 800 Boylston St

General information
- Status: Open
- Location: 800 Boylston Street, Boston, Massachusetts, United States
- Construction started: 1960
- Completed: 1964
- Opened: 1965
- Owner: Boston Properties
- Operator: Boston Properties

Height
- Antenna spire: 907 ft (276 m)
- Roof: 749 ft (228 m)

Technical details
- Floor count: 52
- Floor area: 1,235,777 sq ft (114,807.4 m^{2})
- Lifts/elevators: 18

Design and construction
- Architect: The Luckman Partnership

This page lists tenants of the Prudential Tower and adjacent 111 Huntington Avenue building; both are within the Prudential Center complex in Boston, Massachusetts.

== Tenants of the Prudential Tower ==
Fl#	Tenants
52	View Boston (Indoor Observatory)
51	View Boston Cloud Terrace (Outdoor Observatory), Stratus
50	View Boston, The Beacon, Studio 50, Boston 365
49	Ropes & Gray
48	Ropes & Gray
47	Ropes & Gray
46	Ropes & Gray
45	Ropes & Gray
44	Ropes & Gray
43	Ropes & Gray
42	Ropes & Gray
41	Mechanical floor
40	Ropes & Gray
39	Ropes & Gray
38	Ropes & Gray
37	Ropes & Gray
36	Ropes & Gray
35	Ropes & Gray, Morse, Barnes, Brown & Pendleton
34	Advent International
33	Posternak, Blankstein & Lund LLP, Advent International
32	Posternak, Blankstein & Lund LLP
31	Mechanical floor
30	Ropes & Gray, Heidrick & Struggles, Windham Capital Management, Sugarman & Sugarman
29	—
28	Excel Venture Management, First American Financial, Cubic Asset Management
27	Ropes & Gray, Gordon Brothers
26	Ropes & Gray
25	Robins Kaplan LLP, Fontinalis Partners, Partridge Ankner LLP
24	Fireman Capital Partners
23	Simpson Gumpertz & Heger
22	Accenture, SAS, Housatonic Partners
21	Mechanical floor
20	Boston Properties
19	Boston Properties
18	Boston Properties
17	Eversource
16	Wayfair, Regus, Intrasoft International
15	King Street Capital Management, Riverside Credit Solutions, Thorntree Capital, The Longwood Fund, Mott, Pacific Life, Savills
14	Partners in Health, Prudential, Calera, Palladin
13	Glouston Capital, WPM, Wilder Companies, Guidepost
12	Mechanical floor
11	Partners HealthCare
10	—
9	—
8	MCI, Unicorn
7	Federal Home Loan
6	Federal Home Loan
5	Advent International
4	Willis Towers Watson
3	Partners in Health
2	Guzman Dental, Ropes & Gray
L	Lobby, St. Francis Chapel
C	Prudential Center (shopping mall), Prudential station

Former Tenants: NSTAR, Exeter Group, Cooley LLP

Floor unknown: Varolii

== Tenants of 111 Huntington Avenue ==
111 Huntington Avenue
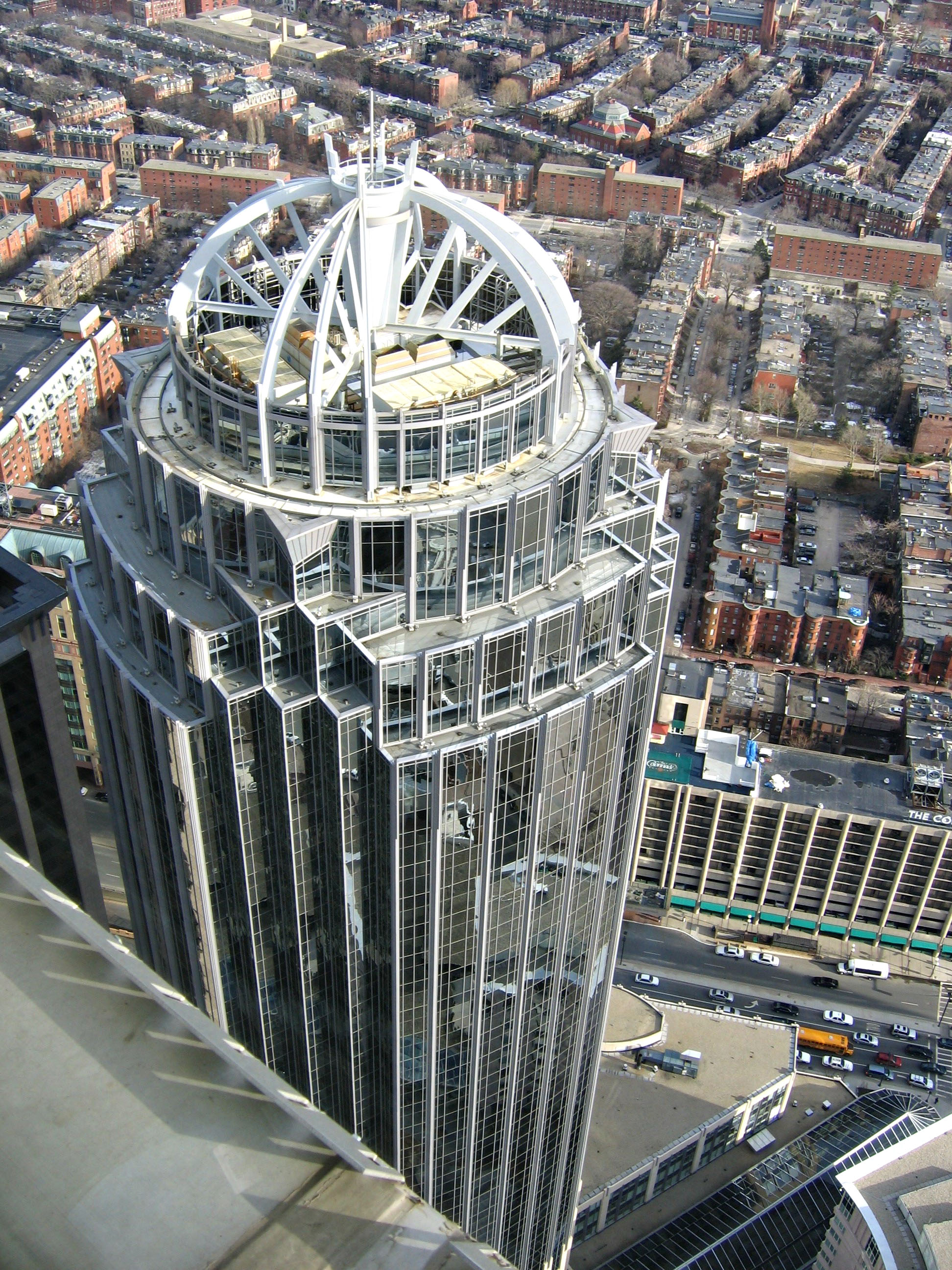
- View of 111 Huntington Avenue from the Prudential Tower observatory
- Alternative names: The R2-D2 Building

General information
- Status: Open
- Location: 111 Huntington Avenue, Boston, Massachusetts, United States
- Construction started: 1999
- Topped-out: 2001
- Completed: 2002
- Opened: 2002
- Owner: Boston Properties
- Operator: Boston Properties, Inc.

Height
- Antenna spire: 564 ft (172 m)
- Roof: 554 ft (169 m)

Technical details
- Floor count: 36
- Floor area: 890,000 sq ft (83,000 m^{2})
- Lifts/elevators: 18

Design and construction
- Architect: CBT Architects

Fl#	Tenants
36	—
35	—
34	—
33	—
32	—
31	—
30	—
29	—
28	—
27	—
26	Foley & Lardner
25	—
24	—
23	—
22	—
21	—
20	BitSight
19	BitSight
18	Steward Health
17	—
16	—
15	—
14	Analysis Group
13	—
12	—
11	—
10	—
9	Locke Lord Edwards
8	—
7	—
6	BTMU Capital Corporation
5	Apple Inc.
4	BTMU Capital Corporation
3	—
2	—
L	Lobby
C	Prudential Center (shopping mall), Prudential station

Floor unknown: MFS Investment Management (anchor tenant), ABRY Partners, Citibank, Beacon Intermodal, Pacific Life

Former Tenants: Bain Capital
