= Mechanics Hall (Boston) =

Building in Massachusetts (1881–1959)

Coordinates: 42°20′45.07″N 71°4′54.52″W

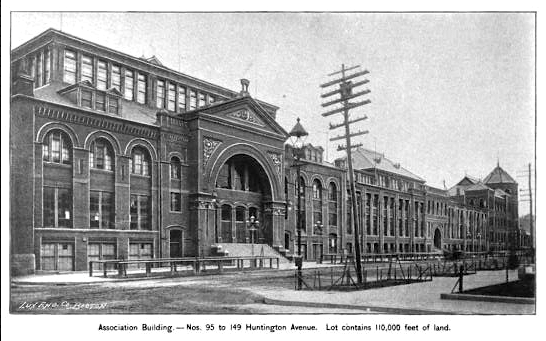
Mechanics Hall, Huntington Ave., Boston, 1892

Mechanics Hall (Boston, Massachusetts) was a building and community institution on Huntington Avenue at West Newton Street from 1881 to 1959. Commissioned by the Massachusetts Charitable Mechanic Association, it was designed by William Gibbons Preston and located between the Boston and Albany railroad yards and Huntington Avenue. It was razed for the Prudential Center urban renewal project of the early 1960s. The site is on the north side of Huntington Avenue, and since 1941 has been served by Prudential Station (originally Mechanics Hall Station) of the MBTA Green Line E branch.

The building's sizable auditorium was host to meetings, conventions, and events such as boat shows, auto shows, dog shows, flower shows and sporting shows. For example, in 1883 the Foreign Exhibition Association held a large exhibit of "foreign arts, manufactures and products". In 1883 the Olympian Club held a "floral display and costume carnival" that included indoor rollerskating. It was briefly the home court of the Boston Whirlwinds of the American Basketball League.

Mechanics Hall was the site of Boston Pops concerts until the Boston Symphony Orchestra brought them to its new home in Symphony Hall in October 1904.

Today, the site is the location of 111 Huntington Avenue.

== See also ==
- Massachusetts Charitable Mechanic Association

== Image gallery ==
Mechanics Hall, Huntington Avenue (1881–1959)

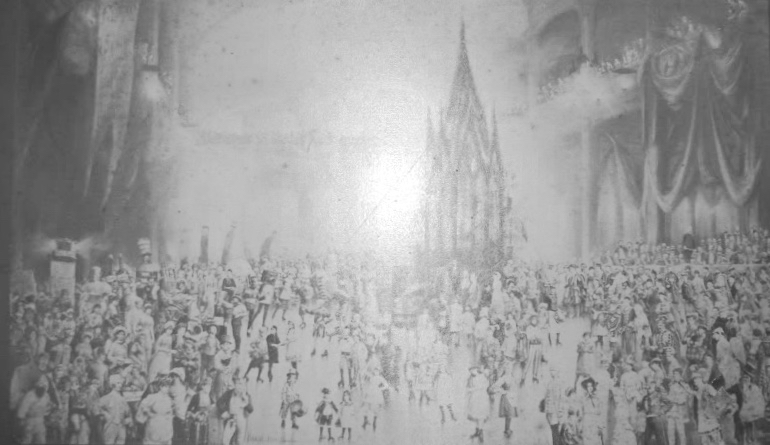
Rollerskating, 1883 (photo by A.N. Hardy)

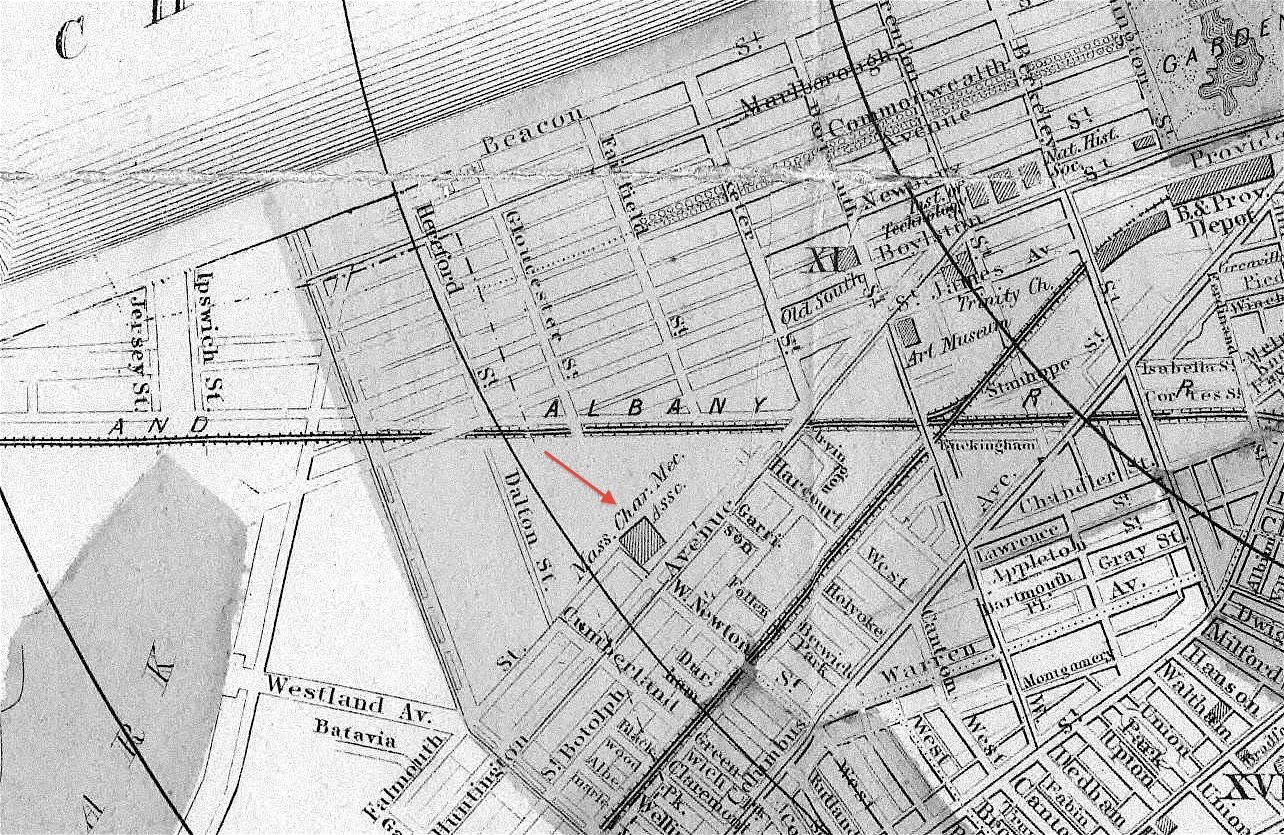
Detail of 1888 map of Back Bay, showing the new Mechanics Hall on Huntington Ave.

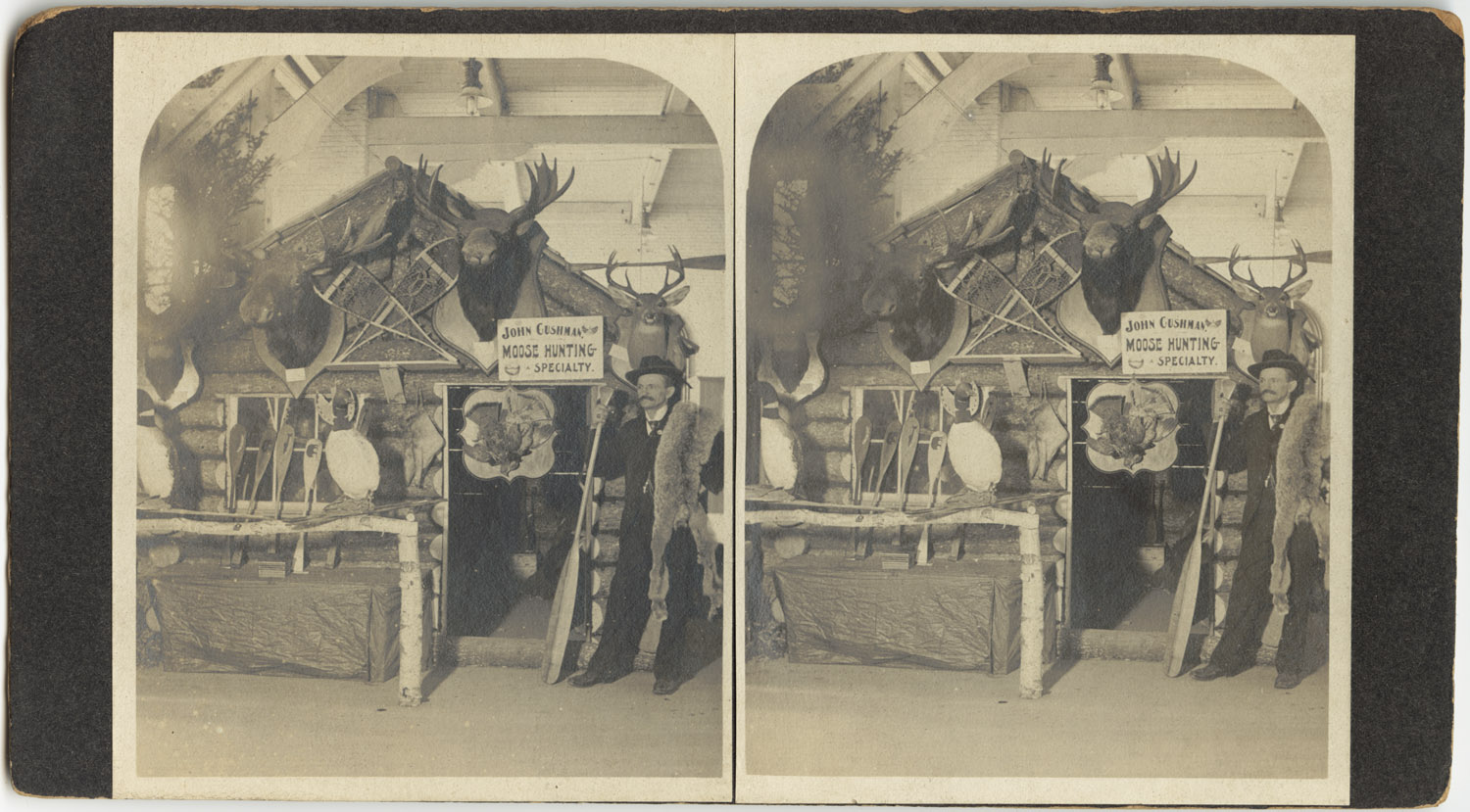
Sportsman's Show, Mechanics Hall, 19th century

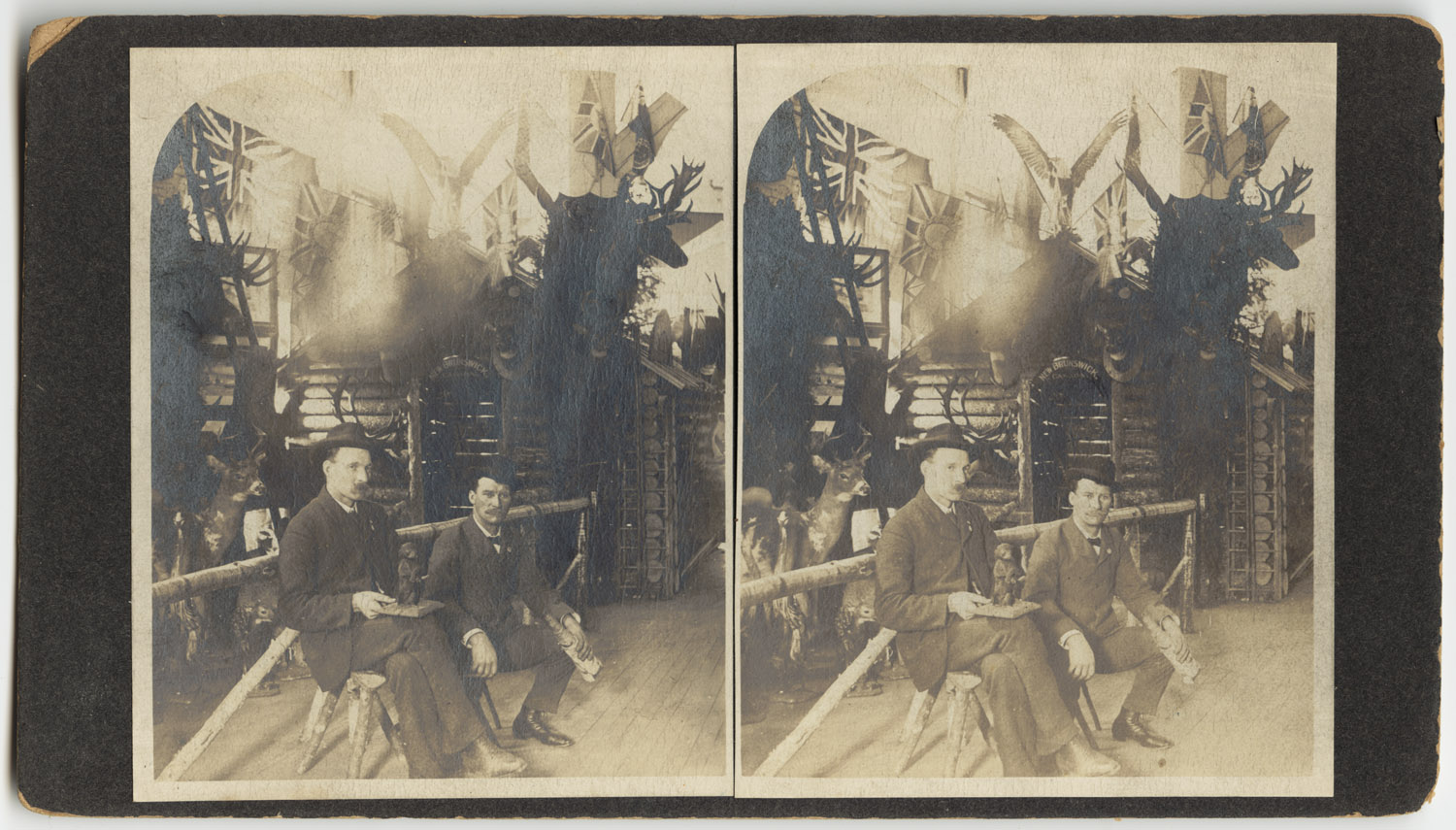
Sportsman's Show, Mechanics Hall, 19th century

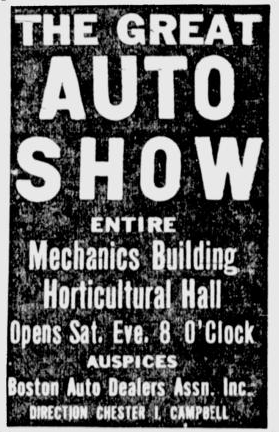
Advertisement for auto show, 1911

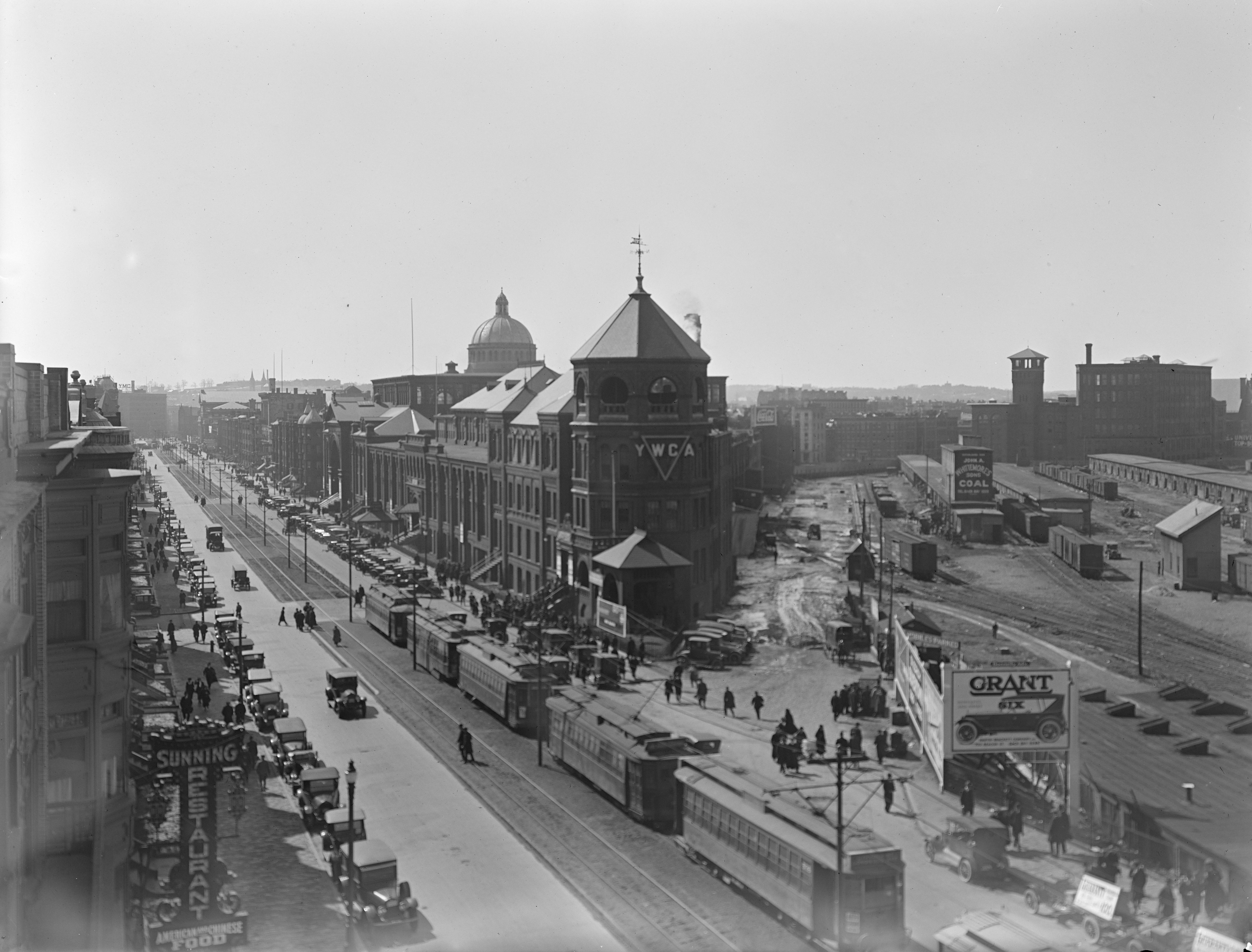
Mechanics Hall, Huntington Ave., 1920

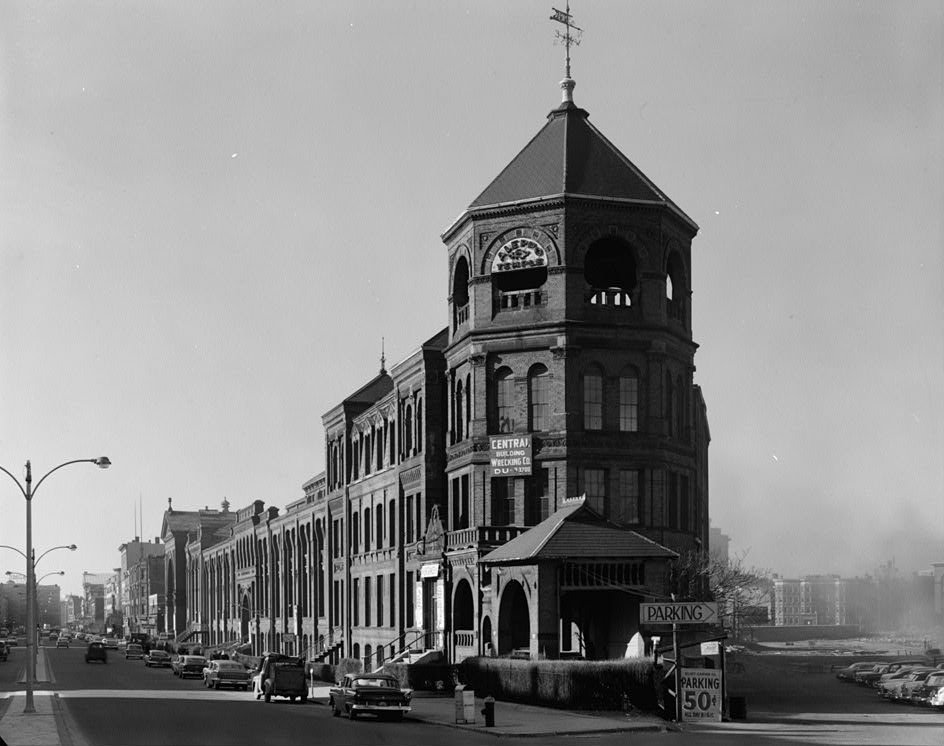
Mechanics Hall, 1959

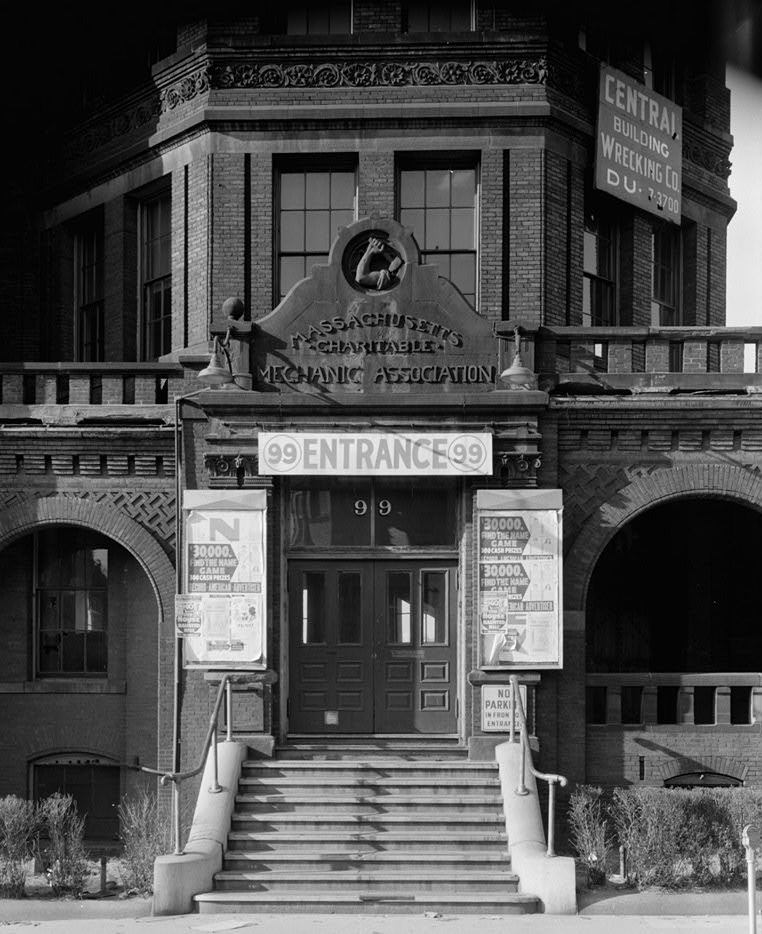
Mechanics Hall, 1959
