= BitSight =

American cybersecurity company

BitSight Technologies, Inc.
- Type: Private
- Industry: Cybersecurity; Risk management
- Founded: 2011; 15 years ago
- Founders: Nagarjuna Venna; Stephen Boyer
- Headquarters: 111 Huntington Avenue; Boston, Massachusetts, United States
- Key people: John Clancy (CEO); Stephen Boyer (CINO); Dave Casion (CTO)
- Website: bitsight.com

BitSight Technologies, Inc. is a cybersecurity company that does security performance monitoring, exposure analysis, and risk management for companies, government agencies, and educational institutions. It is based in Back Bay, Boston. Security ratings that are delivered by BitSight are used by banks and insurance companies among other organizations. The company rates more than 200,000 organizations with respect to their cybersecurity.

== History ==
BitSight was founded in 2011 by Nagarjuna Venna and Stephen Boyer and currently has both United States-based and international employees. In 2016, BitSight raised US$40 million in funding in the month of September.

In 2014, BitSight acquired AnubisNetworks, a Portugal-based cybersecurity firm that tracks real-time data threats.

By September 2016, BitSight had raised $40 million in a Series C round led by GGV Capital, with participation from Flybridge Capital Partners, Globespan Capital Partners, Menlo Ventures, Shaun McConnon, and the VC divisions of Comcast Ventures, Liberty Global Ventures, and Singtel Innov8.

Shaun McConnon stepped down as the CEO of BitSight in July 2017 but remains the executive chairman of the board. The CEO position was filled by Tom Turner in 2017, and then by Stephen Harvey in 2020.

In June 2018, BitSight closed $60 million in Series D funding, bringing the company's total funding to $155 million. BitSight's Series D financing was led by Warburg Pincus, with participation from existing investors Menlo Ventures, GGV Capital and Singtel Innov8.

In 2018, the company was located in Cambridge but purchased property in order to shift to Back Bay, where BitSight is currently located. Forbes has estimated BitSight's revenue as being $100 million as of 2018.

In 2021, BitSight acquired VisibleRisk, a cyber risk assessment startup company and received a $250 million investment from Moody's Corporation.

In 2023, BitSight partnered with Schneider Electric to develop a new way to quantify operational technology risk.

In 2024, Bitsight acquired Cybersixgill, a real-time cyber threat intelligence company.

In 2026, Bitsight announced that it would replace former CEO Steve Harvey with John Clancy.

== Services ==
Organizations purchase BitSight's services in order to understand "security risks associated with sharing sensitive data with business partners." As of 2018, BitSight serves clients, including Lowe's, AIG, and Safeway.

BitSight assembles models that produce company ratings, which are based on a scale that enables insurers to rule on the ability of businesses to receive coverage. It produces ratings for 200,000 organizations as of 2020.

With respect to its services, Amy Feldman of Forbes wrote that "Customers pay on a subscription basis with annual fees ranging from a few thousand dollars to analyze a single company to more than $1 million to review thousands of suppliers." Similar to a credit score, BitSight's ratings range from 250 to 900.
