= The American Exhibition of the Products, Arts and Manufactures of Foreign Nations =

Overview
- BIE-class: Unrecognized exposition
- Name: The American Exhibition of the Products, Arts and Manufactures of Foreign Nations
- Area: 3 Acres
- Visitors: 300,000

Location
- Country: United States
- City: Boston
- Venue: Mechanics Hall (Boston, Massachusetts)
- Coordinates: 42°20′45.07″N 71°4′54.52″W

Timeline
- Opening: September 3, 1883
- Closure: January 12, 1884

The American Exhibition of the Products, Arts and Manufactures of Foreign Nations was held in Boston in 1883 and 1884 in the Mechanics Hall.

It was the world's fair in America that had hosted the most foreign exhibitors at that time, including China and Japan. Henry A. Peirce was the Special Commissioner for the Hawaii (then Kingdom of Hawaii) exhibition.

Although a locally organized exhibition, Congress sanctioned the inclusion of exhibits without duty.

Morris & Co. exhibited and occupied six rooms (total space forty-five feet by thirty feet) showing tapestries and carpets.
