= Copley Place =

Building complex in Boston

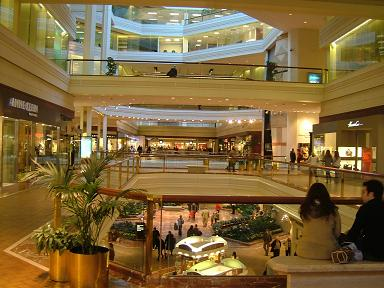
- Interior of the mall concourse, since renovated (2007)

General information
- Status: Open
- Type: Mixed-use; shopping mall; hotel; office
- Location: 100 Huntington Avenue, Boston, Massachusetts, United States
- Coordinates: 42.347363°N 71.079079°W
- Year built: 1980–1984
- Groundbreaking: November 3, 1980; 45 years ago
- Opened: 1984; 42 years ago
- Cost: US$400 million
- Owner: Simon Property Group
- Operator: Simon Property Group

Technical details
- Floor count: 2 (shopping mall); 3 (former Neiman Marcus)
- Floor area: Shopping mall: 385,000 square feet (35,800 m^{2}); Office space: 800,000 square feet (74,000 m^{2})
- Grounds: 9.5 acres (38,000 m^{2})

Design and construction
- Architect: Howard Elkus
- Architecture firm: The Architects' Collaborative
- Developer: Kenneth Himmel

Renovating team
- Renovating firm: Elkus Manfredi Architects

Other information
- Number of stores: 80
- Number of anchors: 2
- Public transit: Back Bay: Orange Line; Framingham/Worcester Line; Providence/Stoughton Line; Acela and Northeast Regional

Website
- simon.com/mall/copley-place

Copley Place is a mixed-use complex of four office buildings, two hotels, and a shopping mall in the Back Bay neighborhood of Boston, Massachusetts, United States. Construction began in 1980, which required air rights over the Massachusetts Turnpike, and was completed in 1984. It is owned and managed by Simon Property Group. It also connects to several nearby destinations managed separately from the center, including the Prudential Center complex, the Sheraton Boston Hotel, and multi-modal Back Bay station. The shopping mall is anchored by a Saks Fifth Avenue men's store. There is one vacant anchor formerly occupied by Neiman Marcus.

In November 2019, the online business news website MassLive rated Copley Place as fourth, and the immediately adjacent Prudential Center as fifth best among 40 malls and shopping centers in Massachusetts.

== Description ==
The bi-level indoors mall is noted for its upscale fashion stores, including Christian Dior, John Varvatos, Golden Goose, Tory Burch, Tiffany & Co., Jimmy Choo, David Yurman, Louis Vuitton, Salvatore Ferragamo, Saint Laurent, Burberry, and Gucci. Above, the third level provides access to a lobby, reception desk, and the bases of the four office towers.

The mall is connected directly to the Prudential Center shopping mall via a skybridge over Huntington Avenue. Another skybridge connects to the Westin at Copley Place hotel (and a few small shops), by crossing Huntington Avenue at a different location. A Marriott hotel anchors one end of Copley Place, and the Neiman Marcus department store anchors the other end. The mall is also connected to the Back Bay MBTA/Amtrak station via a pedestrian tunnel crossing beneath Dartmouth Street.

Simon Property Group, acquired the mall in the 2002 breakup of the then Dutch-owned Urban Shopping Centers, Inc.

Neiman Marcus closed in April 2026. Simon plans to replace it with multiple restaurants and shops.

== Development ==
=== Site ===
The structure was the first major project designed by Howard Elkus, then of The Architects' Collaborative. At the time, it was Boston's largest urban mixed-use development project, financed by the Pritzker family of Chicago. It was built in 1983 directly above the Massachusetts Turnpike and Huntington Avenue highway interchange ramps, which had been constructed in 1964 on the site of the former South End Armory. The Armory building had been completed in 1890, and was razed to make room for the Mass Pike right-of-way. Later, as a principal of Elkus Manfredi Architects, Elkus would lead several major renovations of the mall, and a proposed expansion.

=== Proposed residential tower ===
In 2011, plans for a 60,000 sq ft (5,600 m^{2}) addition of retail space to the facility and a 54,000 sq ft (5,000 m^{2}) expansion of its Neiman Marcus anchor were approved by the Boston Redevelopment Authority. By February 2013, the project was awaiting final design plans. In October 2016, Simon Properties announced indefinite postponement of its $500-million project to build a 52-story luxury residential tower, and drastic scaling back of plans to expand the Copley Place mall, citing concerns about rising costs and competition from other Boston luxury towers already under construction.

== Complex ==
=== Structures ===
List of Copley Place buildings
Name	Floor area
Tower 1	271,518 square feet (25,224.8 m^{2})
Tower 2	230,000 square feet (21,000 m^{2})
Tower 3	195,666 square feet (18,178.0 m^{2})
Tower 4	200,591 square feet (18,635.5 m^{2})

=== Shopping mall ===
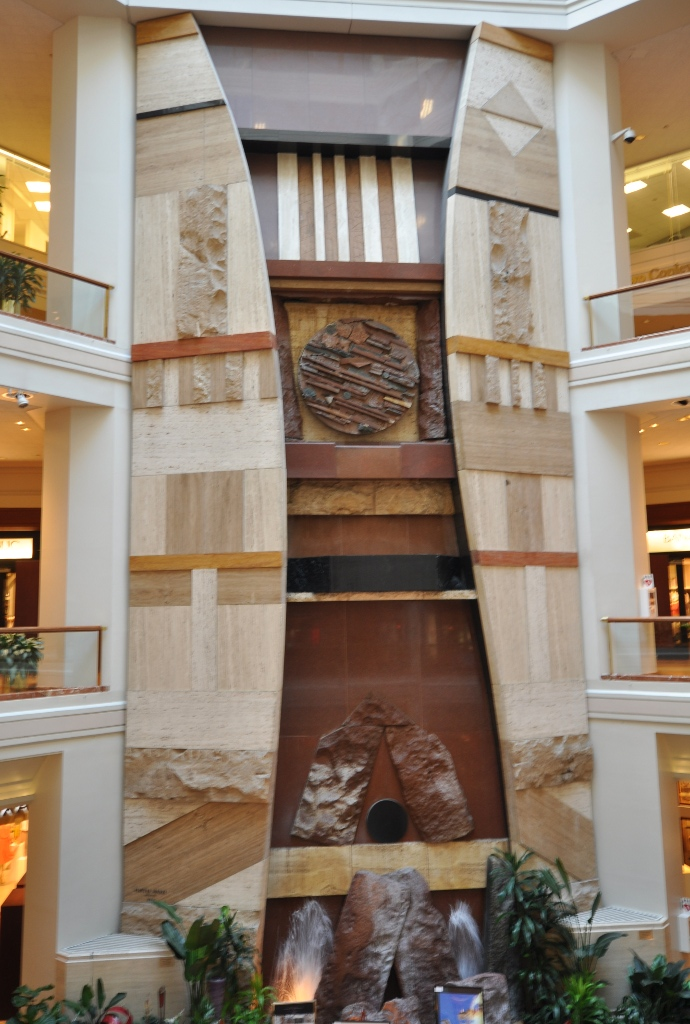
Centerpiece sculptural fountain (Dimitri Hadzi, 1984). The waterfall had been shut off (2012), and the artwork was demolished a few years later.

From its opening, the mall has been marketed as a high-end luxury retail location. Over time, the mix of stores changed in response to sweeping changes affecting the US retailing market. For example, a sizable Rizzoli Bookstore was located opposite the elevators behind the central water feature, but it had closed by the year 2000. Other stores which have moved out include Stoddard's (fine cutlery and personal care tools) and Williams Sonoma (kitchenware and food ingredients). As of 2020, almost all of the stores sell fashionable clothing, shoes, or accessories.

The mall had also housed one of the few major-chain-owned movie theaters within Boston city limits, but the Loews Copley Place Cinemas was closed in January 2005. It was replaced by Barneys New York men's clothing, which closed in 2019. Barney's became a new Saks Fifth Avenue Men's Store, on August 14, 2020.

Upon its opening, the indoor mall featured as its centerpiece a 60-foot (18 m) high sculptural fountain designed by Boston artist Dimitri Hadzi. The artwork was composed of multiple abstract granite and travertine marble shapes, with a waterfall cascading down it into a shallow pool at the bottom, surrounded by marble benches. A proposed renovation which would eliminate the water feature prompted commentary opposing its demolition in 2013. As of 2017, the fountain had been completely removed, and the location and status of its sculptural components were unknown to the general public.

== Major tenants ==
Name	Type	Location	Size	Year opened	Year closed	Notes
Barneys New York	Department store	Mall concourse	46,000 sq ft (4,300 m^{2})	2006	2020	Replaced Loews
The Bridgespan Group	Office	Tower 2				Headquarters
Canada Consulates-General	Office	Tower 3				Located in suite 400
Germany Consulates-General	Office	Tower 3				Located in suite 500
Loews	Movie theater	Mall concourse		1983	2005	
Marriott Copley Place	Hotel					
Neiman Marcus	Department store	Mall concourse	166,900 sq ft (15,510 m^{2})	1983	2026	
Saks Fifth Avenue	Department store	Mall concourse	46,000 sq ft (4,300 m^{2})	2020	—N/a	Men's store; replaced Barneys New York
Wayfair	Office	Tower 4				Headquarters
US Census Bureau	Office	Tower 4				Boston regional office located in suite 301
Westin Copley Place Boston	Hotel					

== Gallery ==
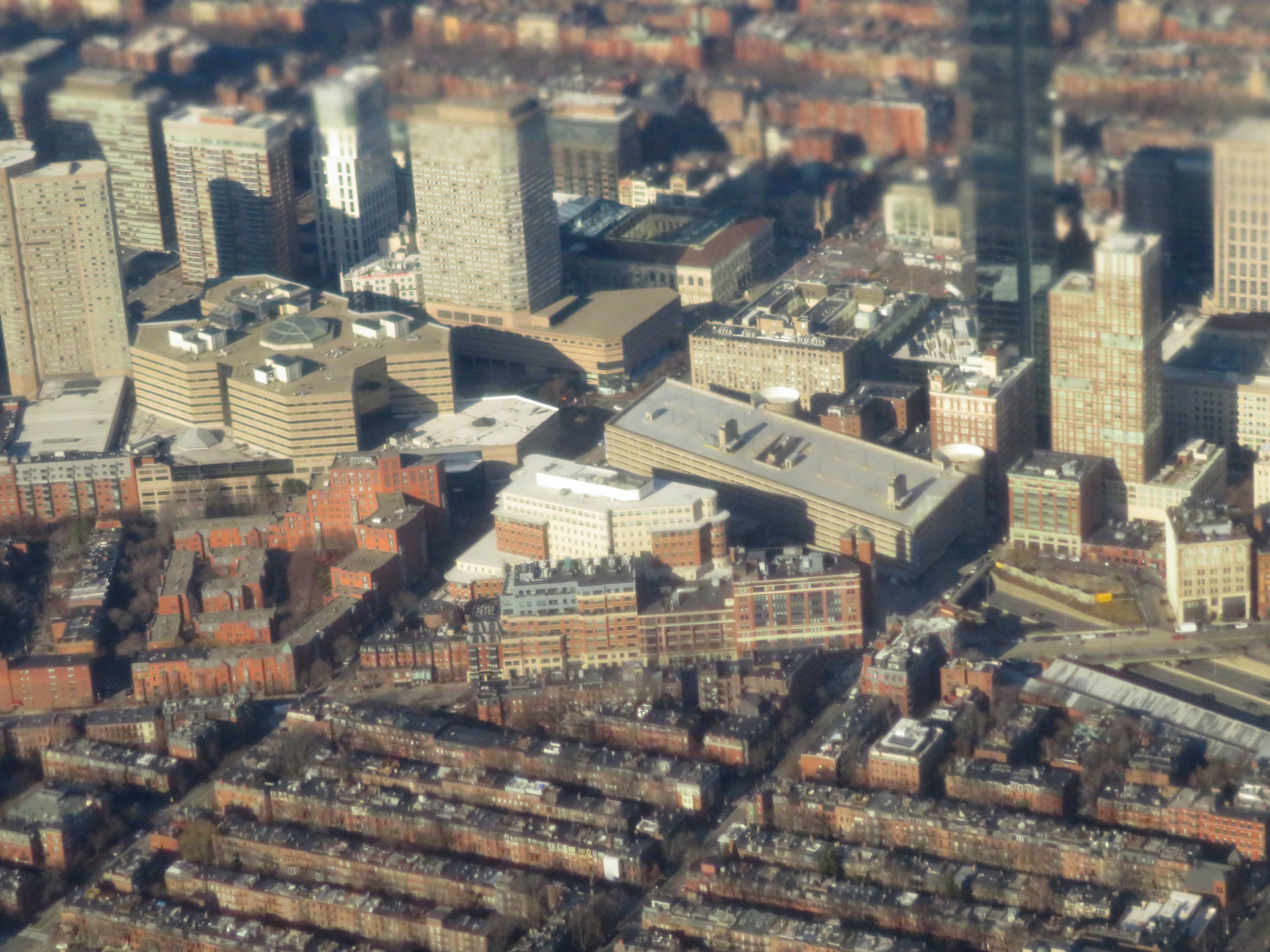
The four Copley Place office towers are the irregular shapes in the upper left of this aerial view

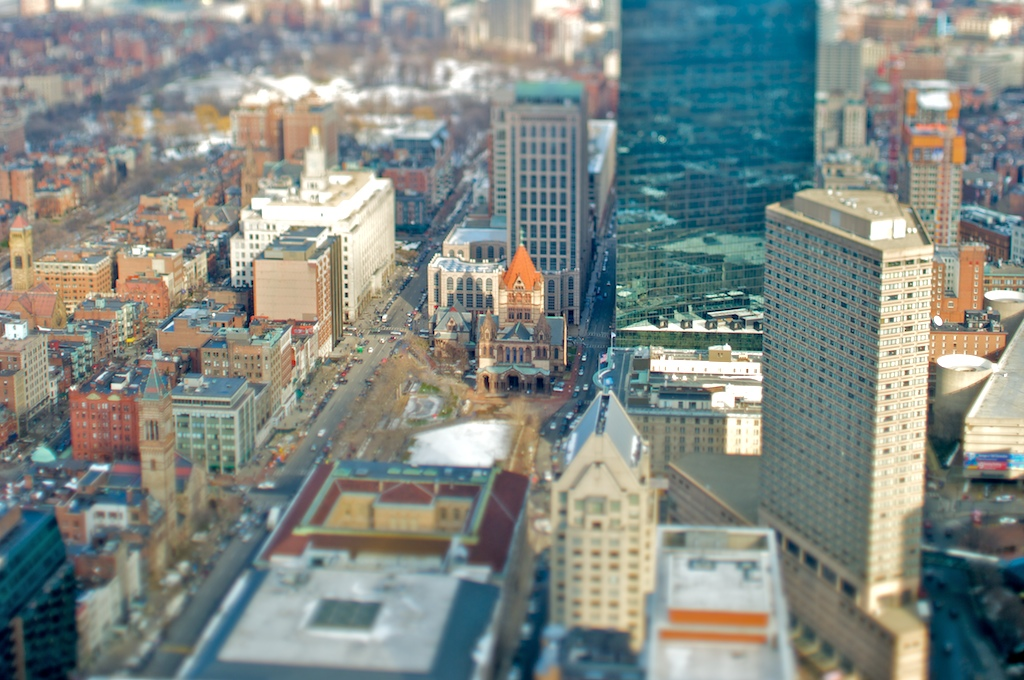
In this view centered on Copley Square, the Westin Copley Place hotel is the tower in the right foreground

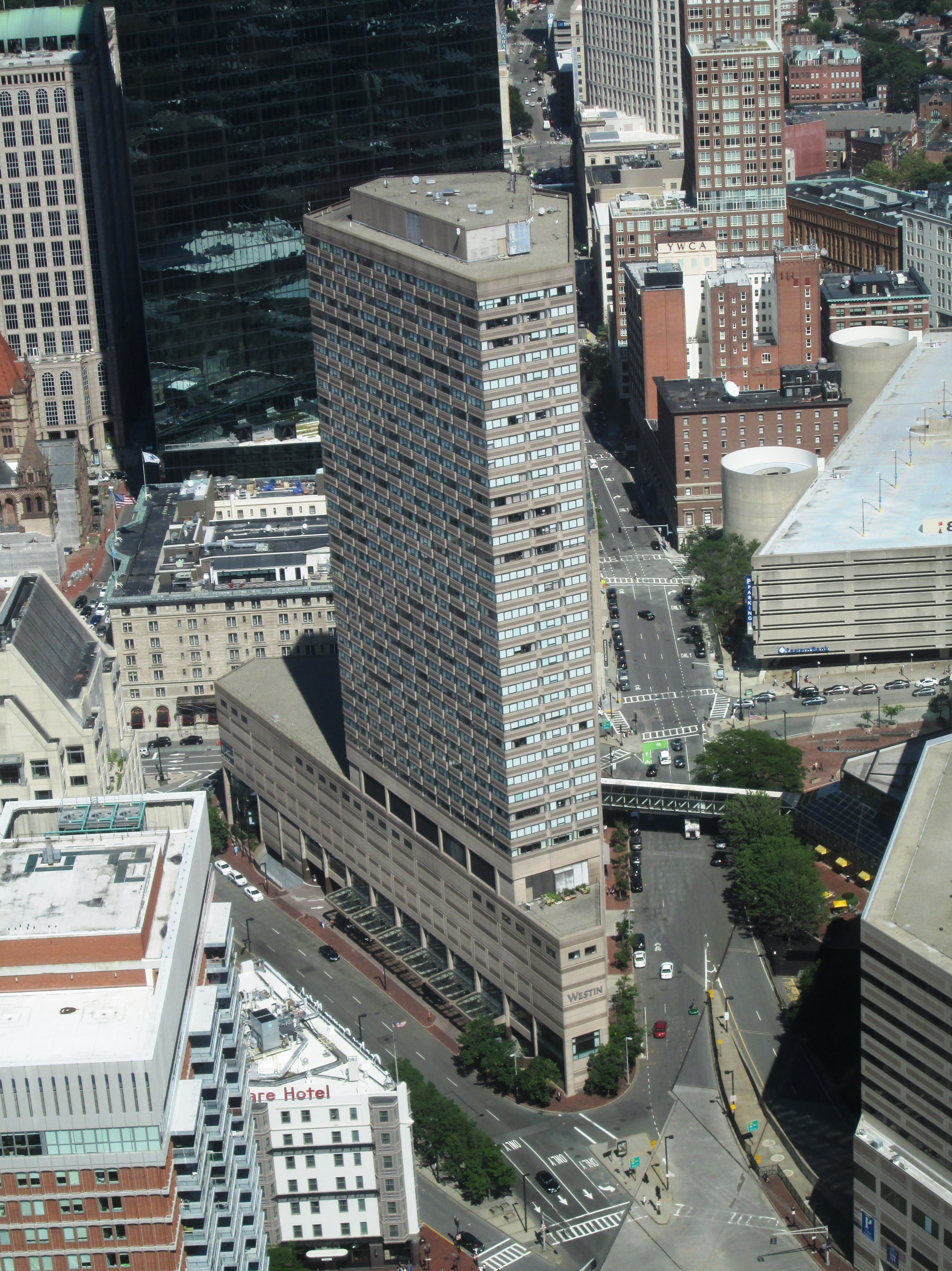
The Westin Copley Place hotel connects via skybridge to the mall at the far right

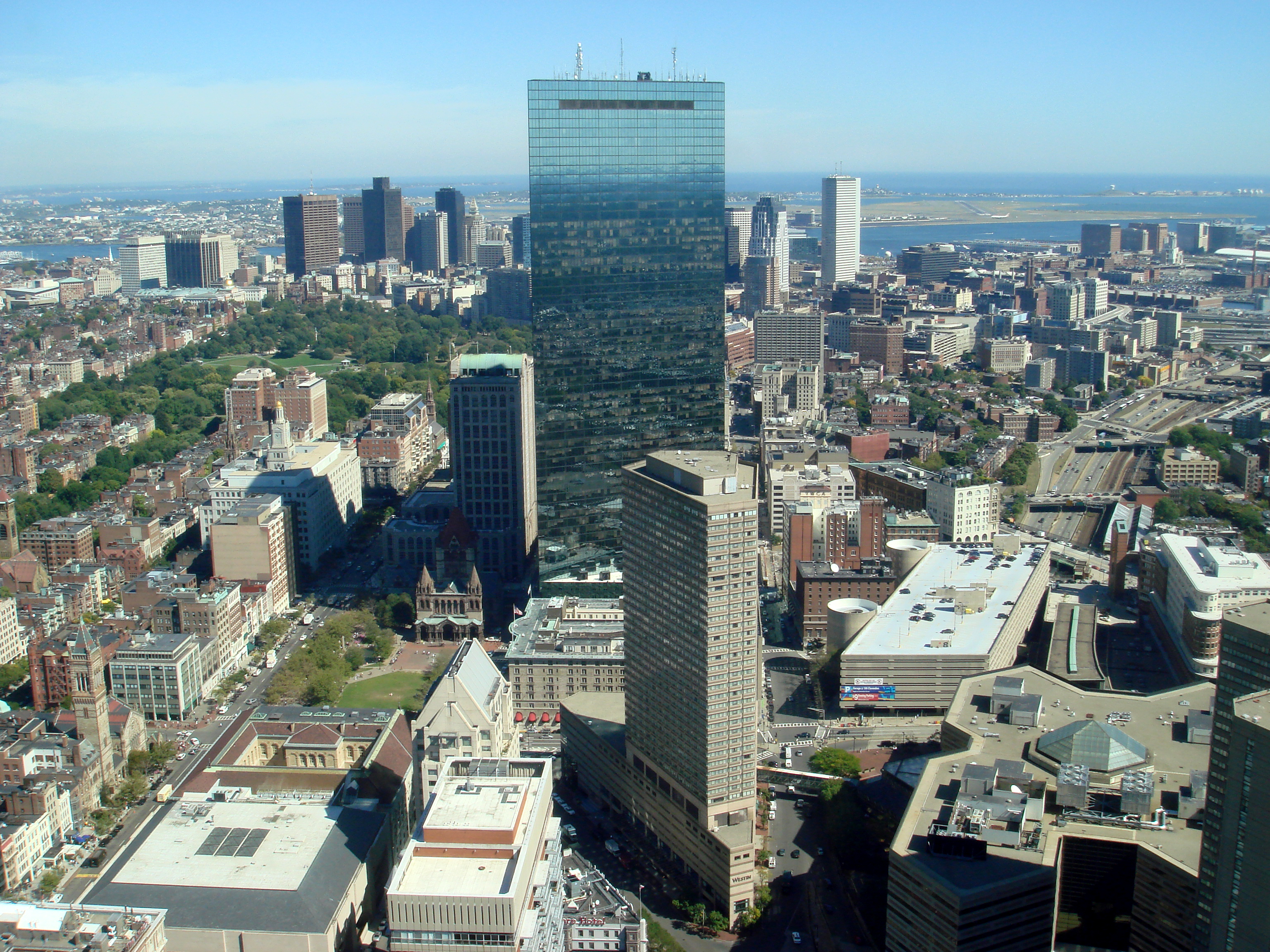
Copley Place mall is located at the lower right of this view

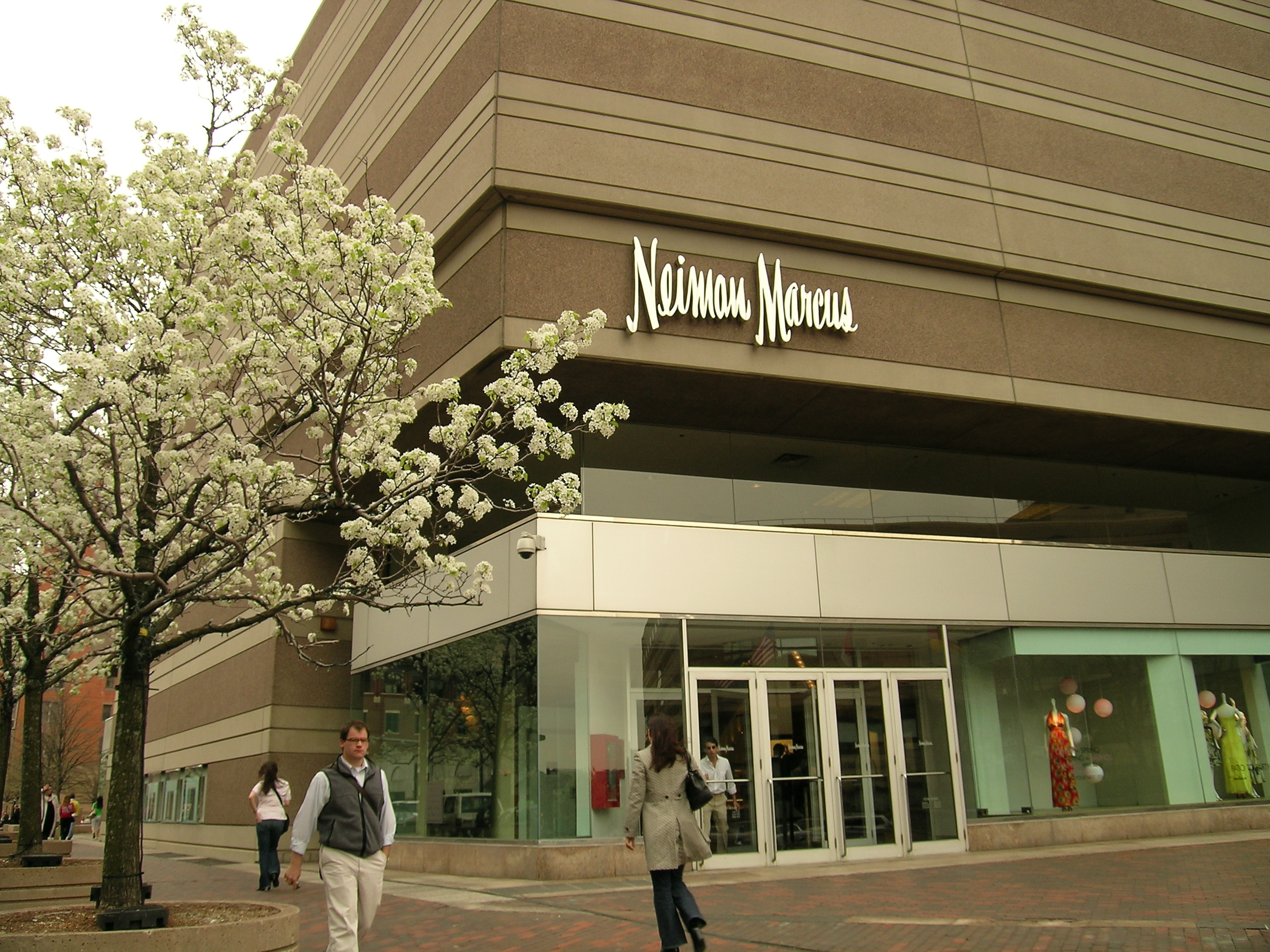
A Neiman Marcus store was the exterior visible anchor tenant at one end of the mall

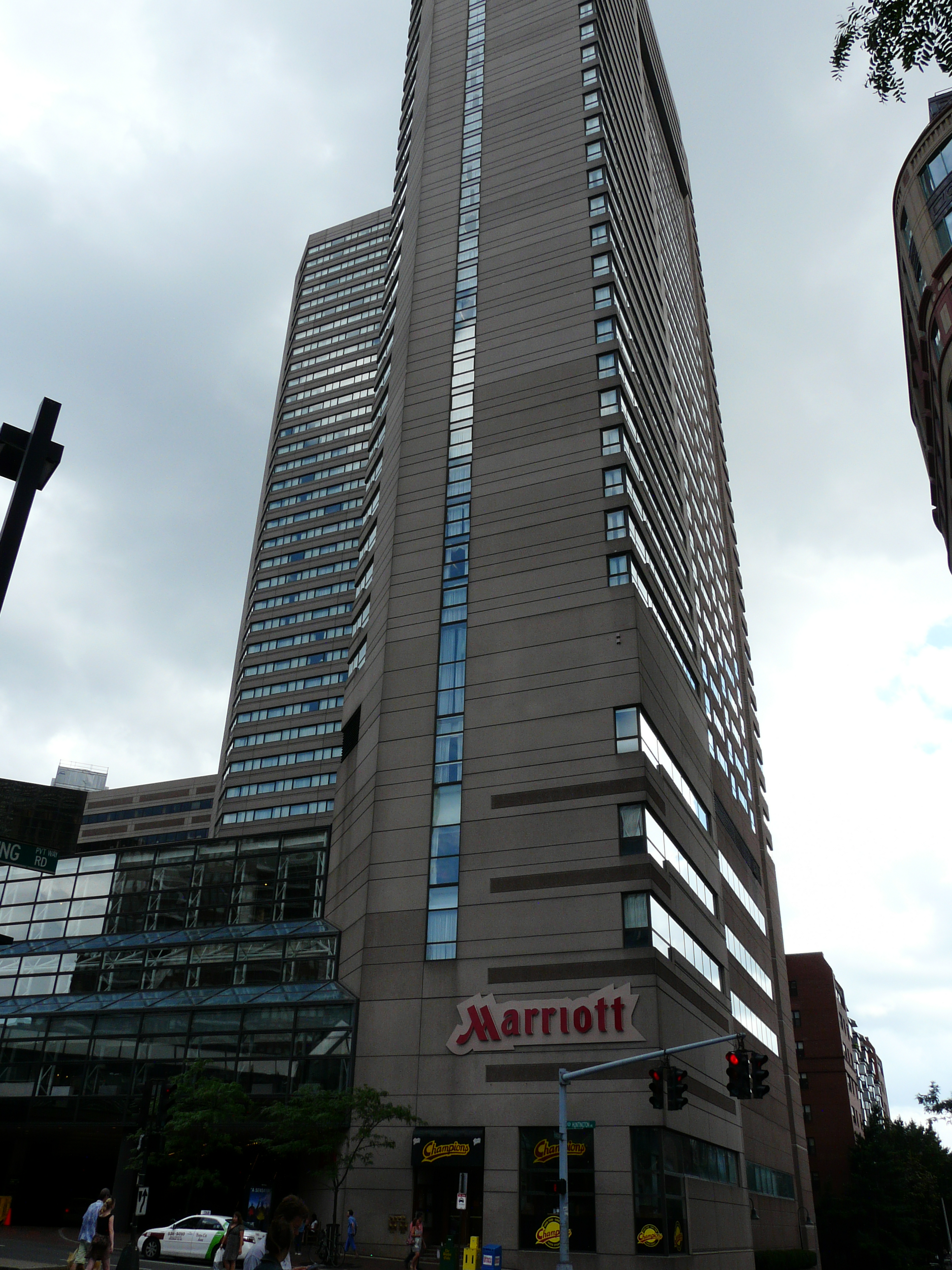
The Boston Marriott Copley Place hotel anchors the other end of the enclosed mall

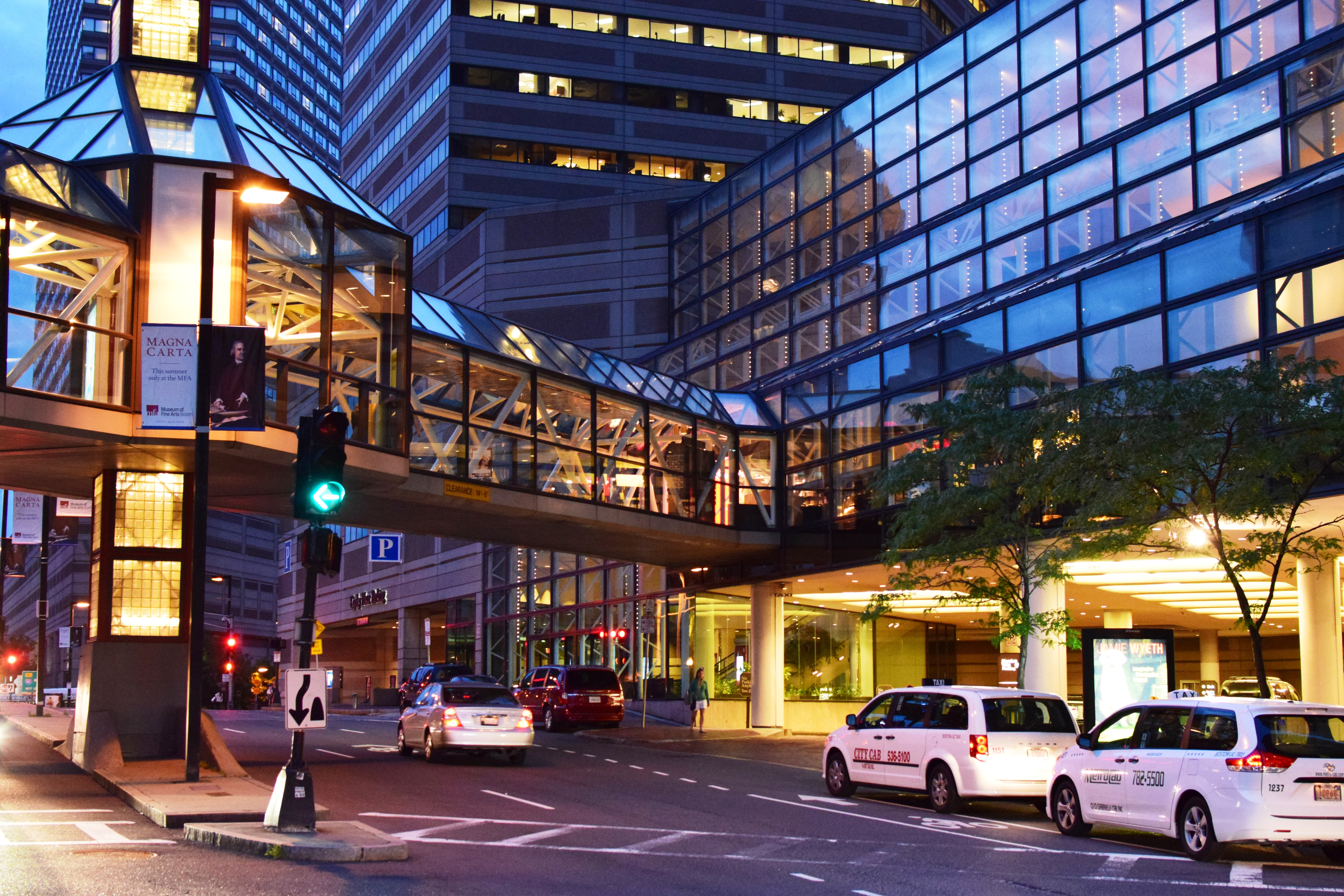
This skybridge connects Copley Place (at right) to the Prudential Center

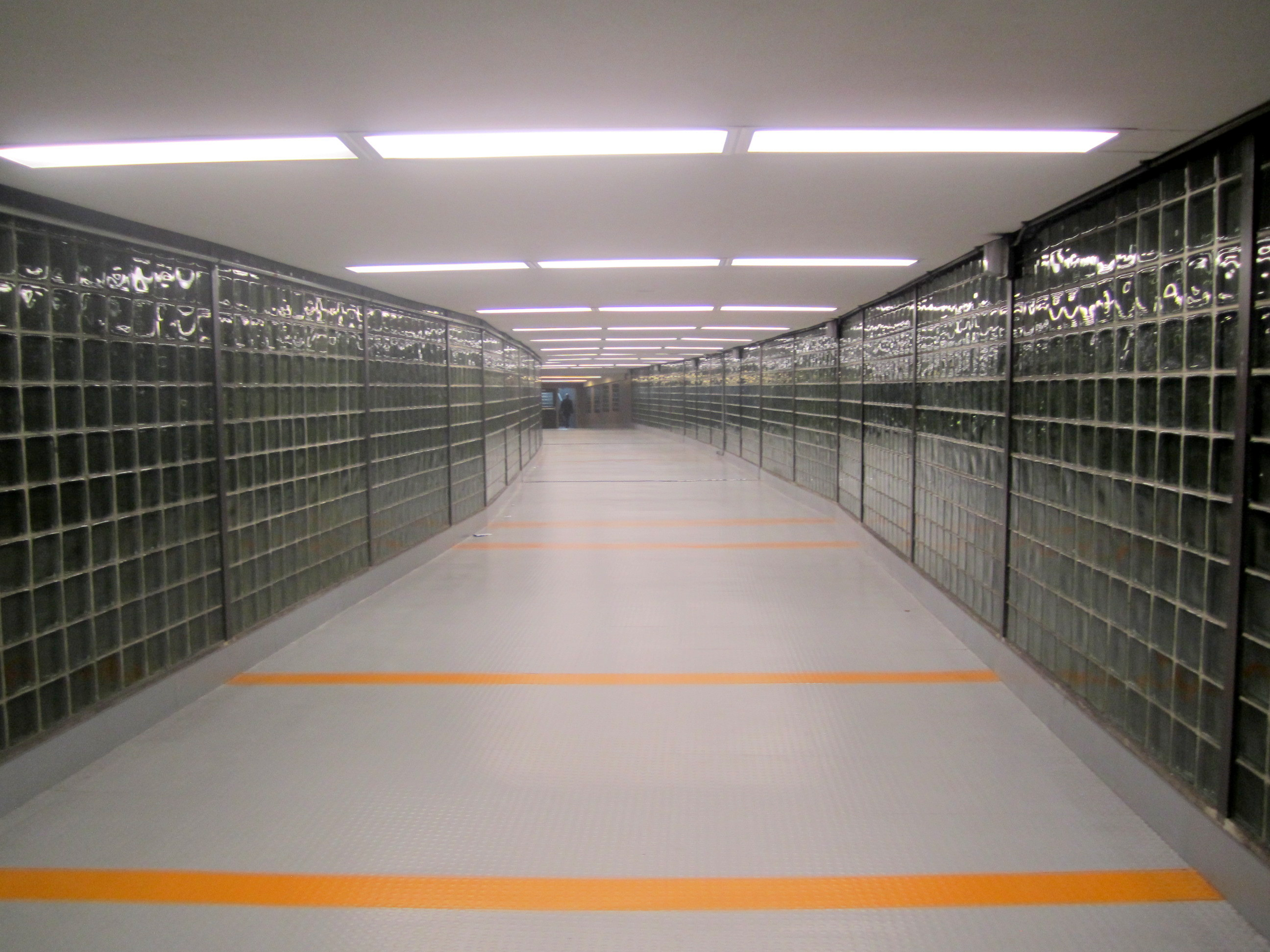
This glassblock-lined underground corridor connects Copley Place to Back Bay station
