= Prudential station =

Light rail subway station in Boston, Massachusetts, US

Prudential
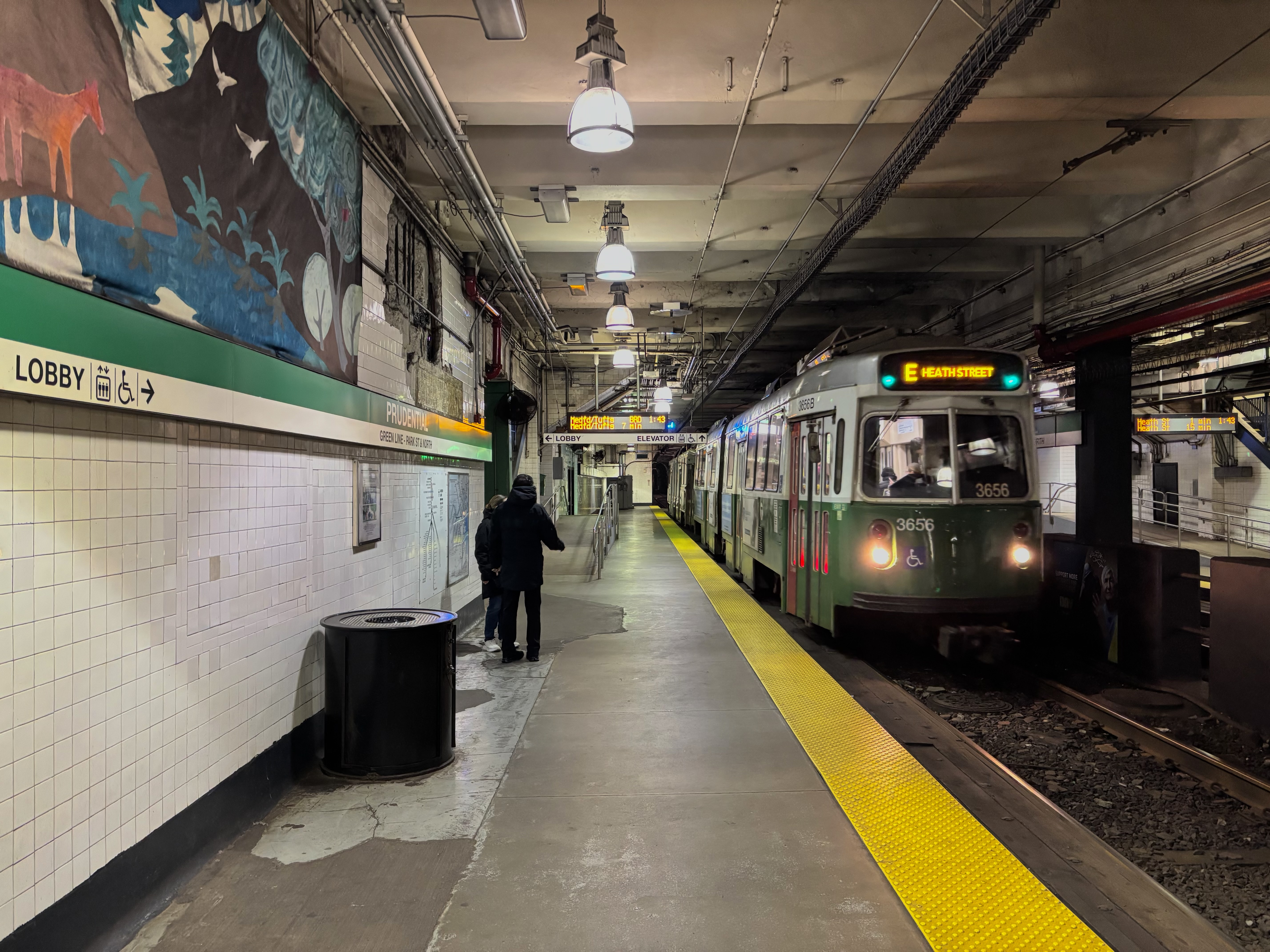
- An inbound train at Prudential station in April 2025

General information
- Location: Huntington Avenue at Belvidere Street; Back Bay, Boston, Massachusetts
- Coordinates: 42.34574°N 71.08131°W
- Line: Huntington Avenue subway
- Platforms: 2 side platforms
- Tracks: 2
- Connections: MBTA bus: 39, 55

Construction
- Structure type: Underground
- Accessible: yes

History
- Opened: February 16, 1941
- Rebuilt: 2002–2003
- Former names: Mechanics (1941–1964)

Passengers
- FY2019: 3,242 daily boardings

Services
Preceding station	MBTA	Following station
Symphony (temporarily closed) toward Heath Street	Green Line E branch	Copley toward Medford/Tufts
Location

Prudential station is an underground light rail station on the MBTA Green Line E branch, located below Huntington Avenue next to the Prudential Center complex near Belvidere Street in Boston, Massachusetts. Prudential station is accessible, featuring low raised platforms and elevator service to the Huntington Arcade of the shopping mall at the base of the Prudential Tower.

== History ==
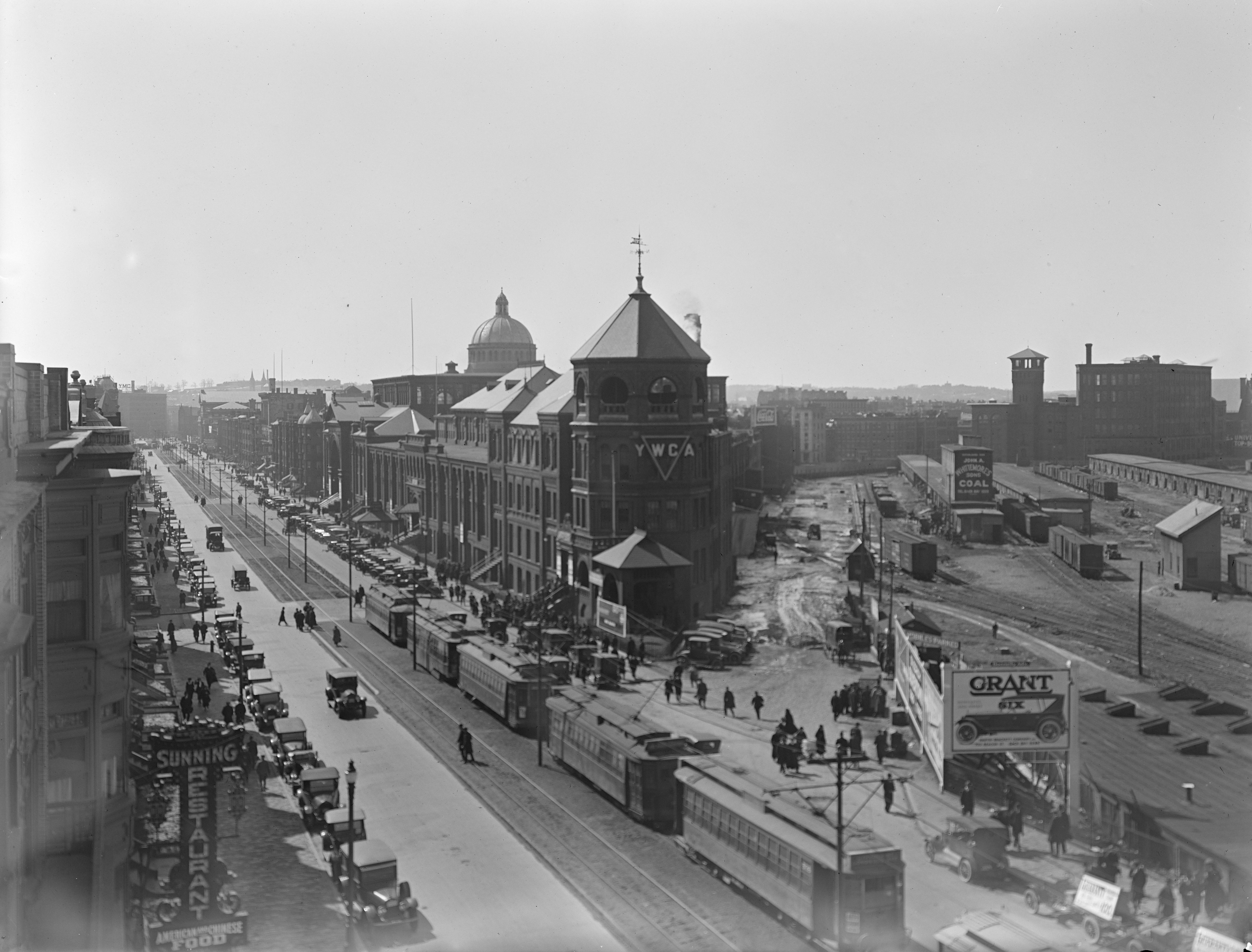
Streetcars on Huntington Avenue at Mechanics Hall in 1920

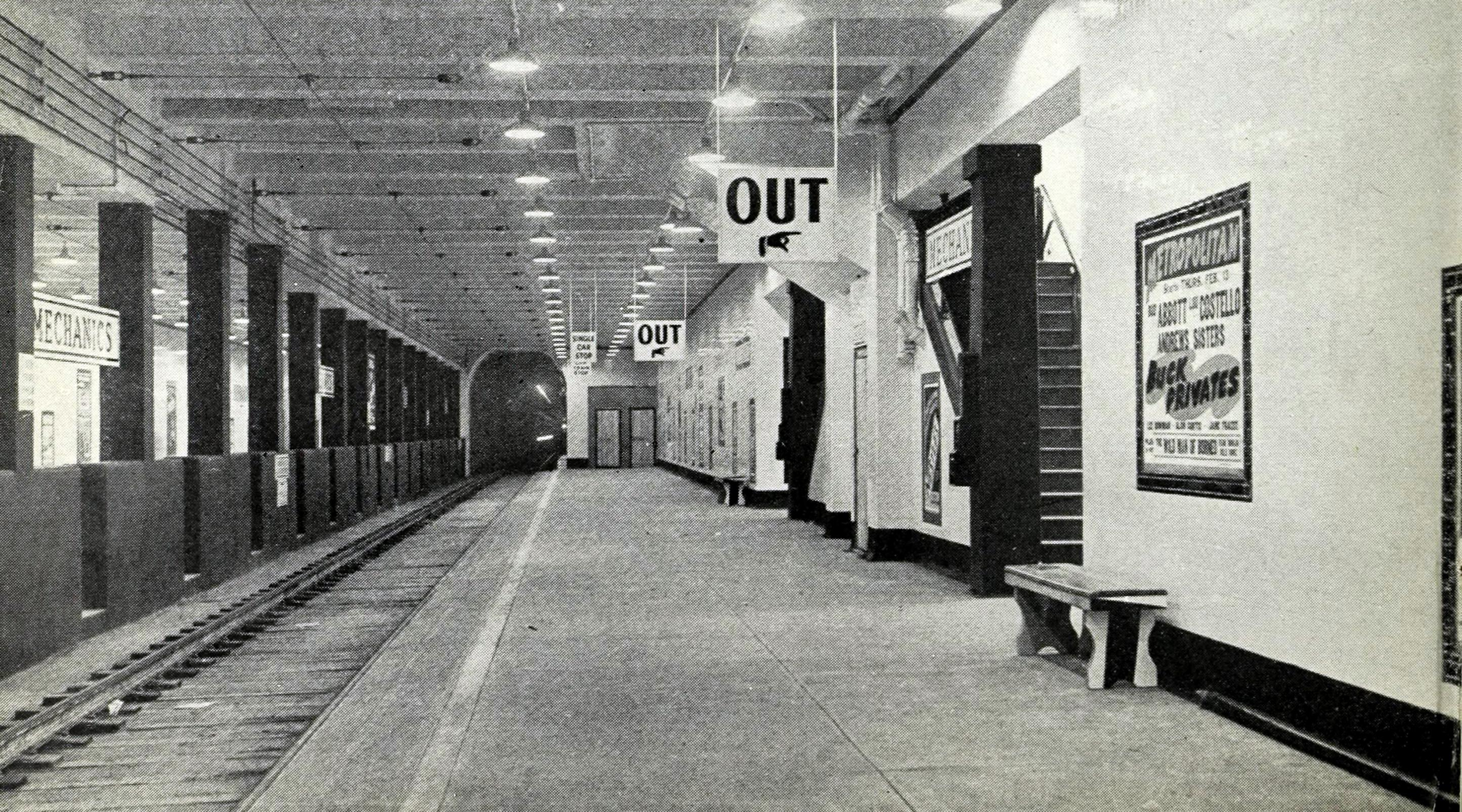
Mechanics station shortly before opening

The first tracks on Huntington Avenue east of Brigham Circle were laid at least as far as Massachusetts Avenue around 1883. By the time the line was electrified in 1894, tracks were in place on Huntington Avenue all the way to Copley Square. Surface cars were rerouted into the Public Garden Portal when the Tremont Street subway opened in 1897. By 1903, a service from Park Street to Arborway – the E branch as it would run for eight decades – was fully in place. Service was shifted to the Boylston Street Portal in 1914.

By the 1930s, auto traffic through Copley Square and Boylston Street (which, unlike Huntington Avenue, lacked dedicated medians for trolleys) caused major delays to streetcars. Mechanics station (named for nearby Mechanics Hall) and Symphony station were opened on February 16, 1941, as the two new stations of the Huntington Avenue subway project. The project was constructed by the Works Progress Administration during the Great Depression and allowed streetcars from Huntington Avenue to go underground through Copley Square, cutting 15 minutes off trip times.

Mechanics Hall was demolished in early 1959 for construction of the Prudential Center development. The station was renamed Prudential on December 3, 1964, upon completion of the Prudential Center. In the 1970s, the headhouse on the inbound side was replaced during a widening of Huntington Avenue. The station was closed on Sundays for some time beginning on February 1, 1981 due to budget cuts. The station was made accessible in 2002–2003 as part of the construction of 111 Huntington Avenue nearby.

In 1994, the fare collector at Prudential was replaced with a token machine except from 3:30 to 6:30 pm. The CharlieCard electronic fare collection system was installed at Prudential in 2006, making it fare-controlled at all operating hours.
