= Prudential Center (Boston) =

Building complex in Boston, Massachusetts

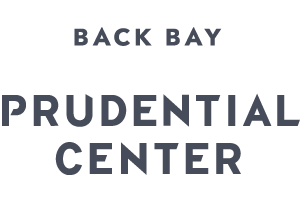

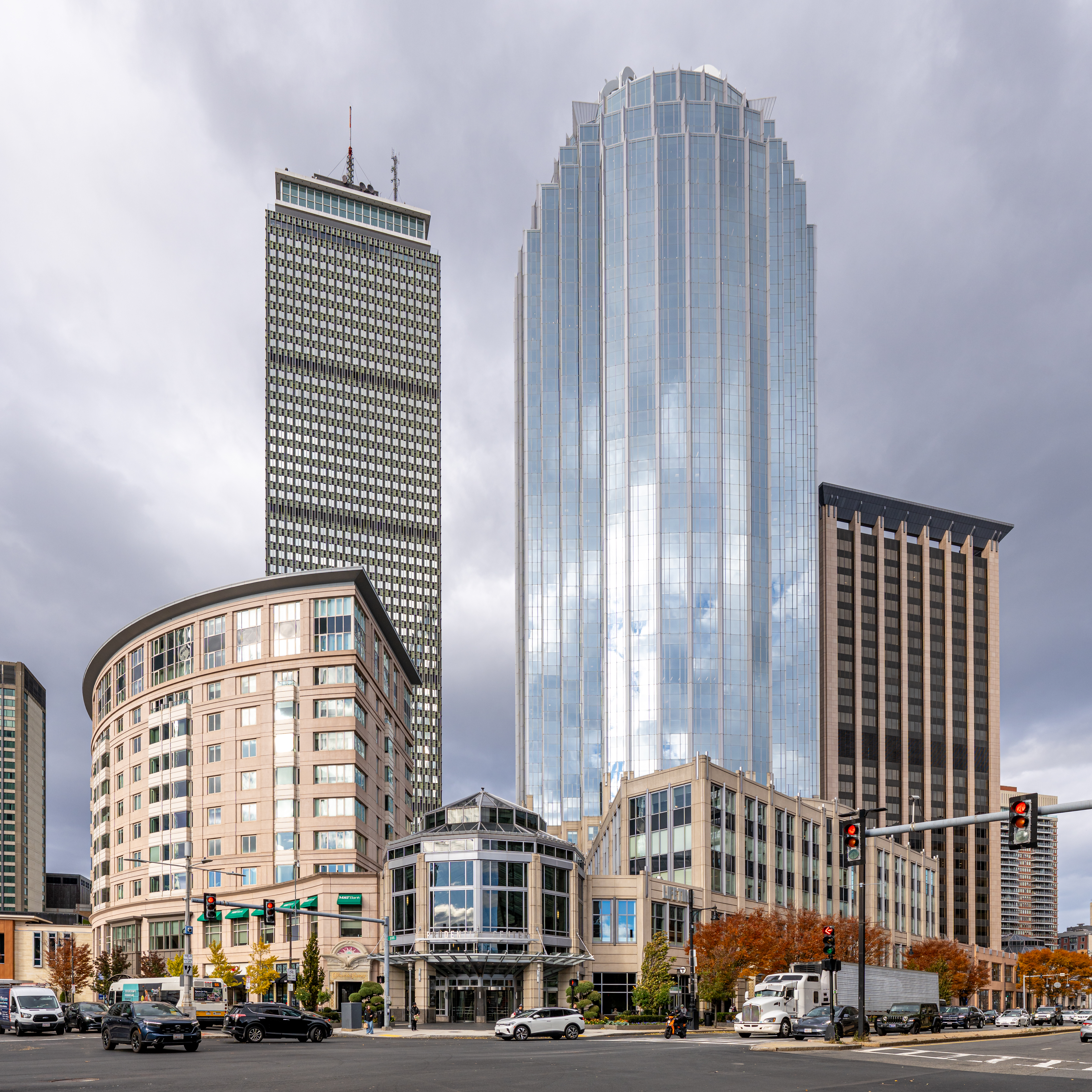
- Prudential Center, viewed from Huntington Avenue, with the Prudential Tower (left), 101 Huntington Avenue (foreground), and 111 Huntington Avenue (center right) (2025)
- Interactive map of the Prudential Center area
- Former names: Shops at Prudential Center (shopping mall)

General information
- Status: Completed
- Type: Mixed-use; office; retail
- Location: 800 Boylston Street, Boston, Massachusetts, U.S.
- Coordinates: 42.34846°N 71.08262°W
- Opened: Prudential Center: 1993; Prudential Tower: 1964; 111 Huntington Avenue: 2001; 101 Huntington Avenue: 1973; 888 Boylston Street: 2016
- Renovated: 2016
- Owner: BXP, Inc.
- Operator: BXP, Inc.
Further information
Height
Roof	Prudential Tower: 749 feet (228 m); 101 Huntington: 336 feet (102 m); 111 Huntington: 554 feet (169 m); 888 Boylston: 325 feet (99 m)
Technical details
Floor count	52 (Prudential Tower); 25 (101 Huntington); 36 (111 Huntington); 18 (888 Boylston)
Floor area	Prudential Tower: 1.2 million square feet (110,000 m^{2}); 101 Huntington: 524,000 square feet (48,700 m^{2}); 111 Huntington: 889,228 square feet (82,612.0 m^{2}); 888 Boylston: 425,000 square feet (39,500 m^{2}); Shopping mall: 500,914 square feet (46,536.4 m^{2})
Grounds	2.3 acres (9,300 m^{2})

Design and construction
- Developer: The Hahn Company

Other information
- Number of stores: 75
- Number of anchors: 2
- Public transit: MBTA subway: at Prudential

Website
- prudentialcenter.com

The Prudential Center (colloquially the Pru) is a mixed-use complex of four office buildings in the Back Bay neighborhood of Boston. It originated with the Prudential Tower in 1964, and was followed by 101 Huntington Avenue in 1973. The shopping mall concourse level that connects the towers and surrounding buildings opened in 1993. 111 Huntington Avenue and 888 Boylston Street were connected to the concourse upon their 2001 and 2016 openings, respectively. It connects to several nearby destinations managed separately from the center including the Copley Place shopping mall, the Hynes Convention Center, the Sheraton Boston Hotel, and Prudential station serving the Green Line E branch of the MBTA subway.

== Development ==
=== Site ===
The location originally consisted of marshlands next to the Charles River in the Back Bay district of Boston. The wetlands were gradually filled in, and a large railyard was built. In the early 1960s, the railyard was replaced by the Prudential Tower and several smaller buildings.

Originally, only one department store (Saks), along with a handful of shops, existed around the base of the Prudential Tower in a small shopping arcade. Nearby structures including the Hynes Convention Center, 101 Huntington Avenue office tower, a Sheraton Hotel, and other various shops were separated by open plazas in a patchwork of disjointed buildings.

A large, windswept paved plaza off Boylston Street was dominated by a 27-foot (8.2 m) sculptural bronze male nude by Boston-educated artist Donald Harcourt De Lue, titled Quest Eternal, and installed in 1967. Popularly known as "The Naked Guy", the 5-ton sculpture, cast in one piece, depicted a Mannerist heroic figure stretched diagonally upwards towards the sky. The Boston Christmas Tree, annually donated by Nova Scotia, was placed on this plaza from 1971 until 2002, when it was moved to the Boston Common.

=== Establishment of the Prudential Center ===
In 1991, a plan was put forth to connect all of the buildings together with an enclosed and expanded shopping center, in the area bordered by Boylston Street, Huntington Avenue, and Dalton Street. The Hahn Company, together with then-owner Prudential Insurance Company of America, spent over two years developing the $100 million project.

In 1993, the new Shops at Prudential Center was completed, and largely successful in filling its new spaces. Multiple buildings surrounding the Prudential Center were now connected through the shopping arcade, with pedestrian traffic ranging from office workers to convention attendees able to travel conveniently to various destinations regardless of the weather.

In 2014, a new entrance to the Prudential Center was built to replace the remaining open plaza bordering Boylston Street. That required for the Quest Eternal statue to be removed, and its whereabouts and future were unknown to the general public. In 2019, the Boston City Council announced that it had accepted the donation of the statue from Boston Properties, and would install it in the public Smith Playground, near the intersection of Western Avenue and North Harvard Street in the Allston district. There remain several smaller works of public art at the Prudential Center complex, including temporary art installations.

On August 24, 2020, it was announced that high end regional division Lord & Taylor would close. On June 30, 2022, it was announced that Dick's Sporting Goods was in final negotiations to take over the Lord & Taylor building at the center for its House of Sports concept store.

== Complex ==
=== Structures ===
List of Prudential Center buildings
Name	Image	Year opened	Height	Floor area
Prudential Center (concourse level)		1993; 33 years ago	—N/a	500,914 square feet (46,536.4 m^{2})
Prudential Tower		1964; 62 years ago	749 feet (228 m)	1.2 million square feet (110,000 m^{2})
101 Huntington Avenue		1973; 53 years ago	336 feet (102 m)	524,000 square feet (48,700 m^{2})
111 Huntington Avenue		2001; 25 years ago	554 feet (169 m)	889,228 square feet (82,612.0 m^{2})
888 Boylston Street		2016; 10 years ago	325 feet (99 m)	425,000 square feet (39,500 m^{2})

=== Shopping mall ===
A Mandarin Oriental hotel is part of the complex, as well as the Avalon and the Belvidere Residences apartments.

The shopping complex is anchored by Saks Fifth Avenue. The mall is home to over 75 specialty retailers, including upscale stores such as Earl's, Lacoste, Club Monaco, Ralph Lauren, Vineyard Vines, and more. Around 20 food-related businesses ranging from quick snacks to fine dining are located at the mall, with many other independent restaurants located nearby outside. A 45,000-square-foot (4,200 m^{2}) open-market format Eataly location was opened in November 2016, replacing a former food court within the mall.

Transportation connections include the Prudential subway station and the nearby Hynes Convention Center station, both on branches of the MBTA Green Line. The Back Bay multimodal station, with access to the MBTA Orange Line, MBTA Commuter Rail, and Amtrak inter-city rail, is a short climate-controlled walk away via the adjacent Copley Place shopping mall. MBTA bus routes 39, 54, and 507 stop at the center, and there is underground parking available on-site.

== Notable tenants ==
=== St. Francis Chapel ===
The St. Francis Chapel, a functioning Roman Catholic chapel staffed by the Oblates of the Virgin Mary and located inside the shopping center since 1969, offers three daily masses, the sacrament of reconciliation, and Eucharistic adoration daily, as well as a religious giftshop.

The original chapel was first dedicated on November 11, 1969, by Cardinal Richard Cushing. A crowd of 400, almost double its official capacity, crowded into the chapel for the dedication. Cushing said at the time he wanted it to be an "ecumenical chapel. We want people of all faiths to come here and speak to God through their own prayers." He also wanted "to make Christ's presence known in the heart of a sprawling modern cityscape." Present at the dedication was Fr. Robert Lynch, OFM, the chapel's first director. It was originally staffed by the Franciscans who had come to Boston to establish the Shrine of St. Anthony in 1947. It was designed by Brother Cajetan Baumann, OFM, the head of Franciscan Art and Architecture Office and built by Cambridge's Thomas O'Connor Company. On June 1, 1983, the Franciscans turned over the Chapel to the Oblates of the Virgin Mary. In 1986, construction forced that chapel to close and a new chapel to be reopened near the entrance of the Hynes Convention Center, next to a Dunkin' Donuts. This chapel, which is still in operation, was dedicated on April 28, 1993, by Cardinal Bernard Law.

In 2025, many of those who attend mass or come to pray at the chapel are young people, including many students from nearby colleges and universities. A group of students from the Berklee College of Music formed a choir. It also serves a large Hispanic community. It is estimated that between 1,500 and 2,000 people enter the chapel in a given week, many of whom are seeking to go to confession after years of being away from the Church. In early 2025, the chapel underwent a series of renovations, including its first new coat of paint in 18 years, for a total cost of $40,000. The renovations were spurred by a $25,000 anonymous gift. Part of the renovations included scrubbing the walls behind the votive candles, which were smoky after tens of thousands of prayers were said there in the previous 30 years. As of 2025, Father Jeremy Paulin is the director of the chapel, a position he has held since June 2024.

== Reception ==
In November 2019, the online business news website MassLive rated the Shops at Prudential Center as fifth, and the immediately adjacent Copley Place as fourth-best, among 40 malls and shopping centers in Massachusetts.

== Gallery ==
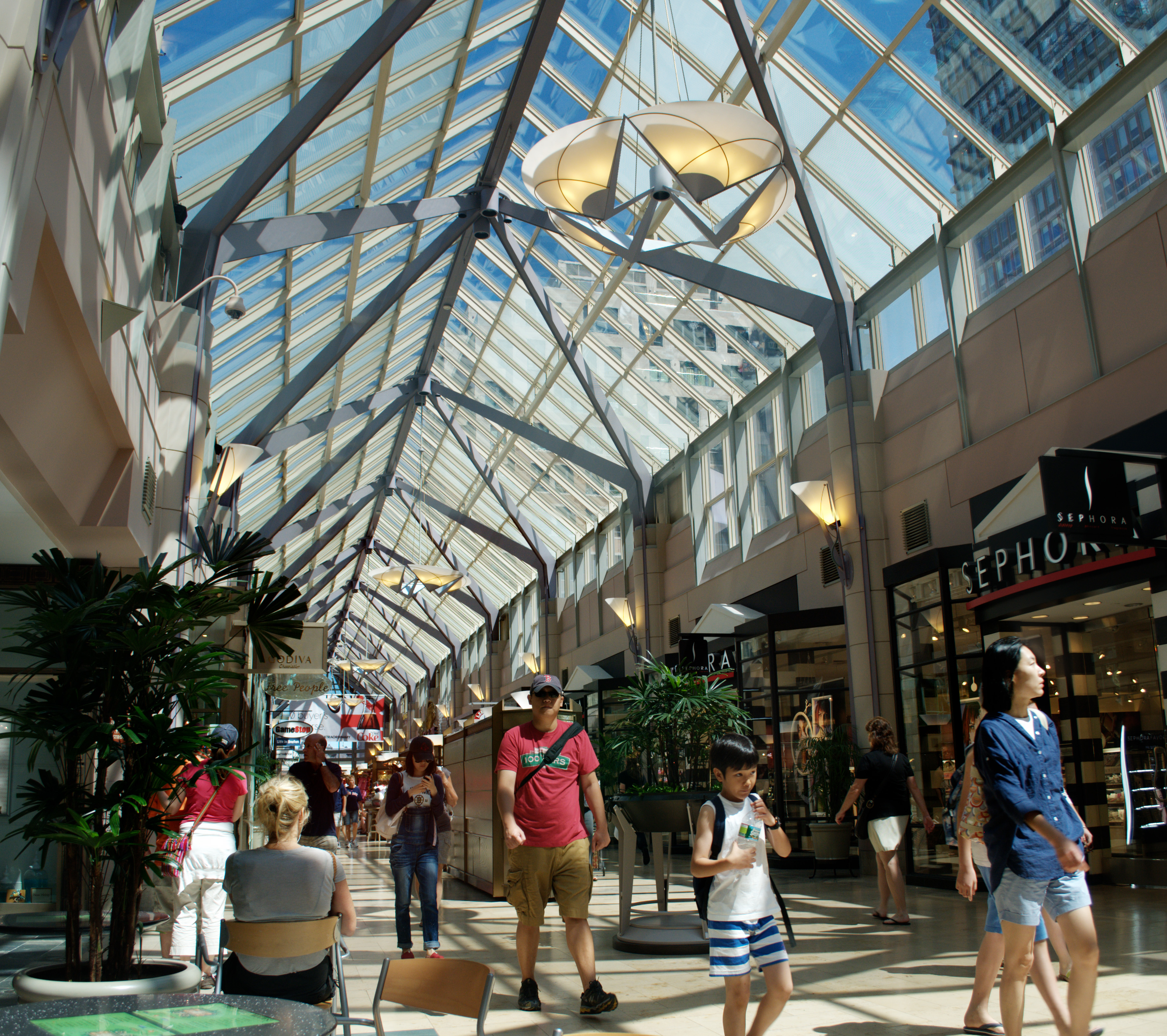
Interior of promenade (July 2011)

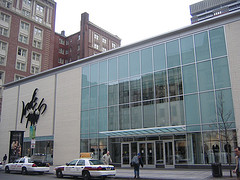
Lord & Taylor (now closed) entrance at Prudential Center (2007)

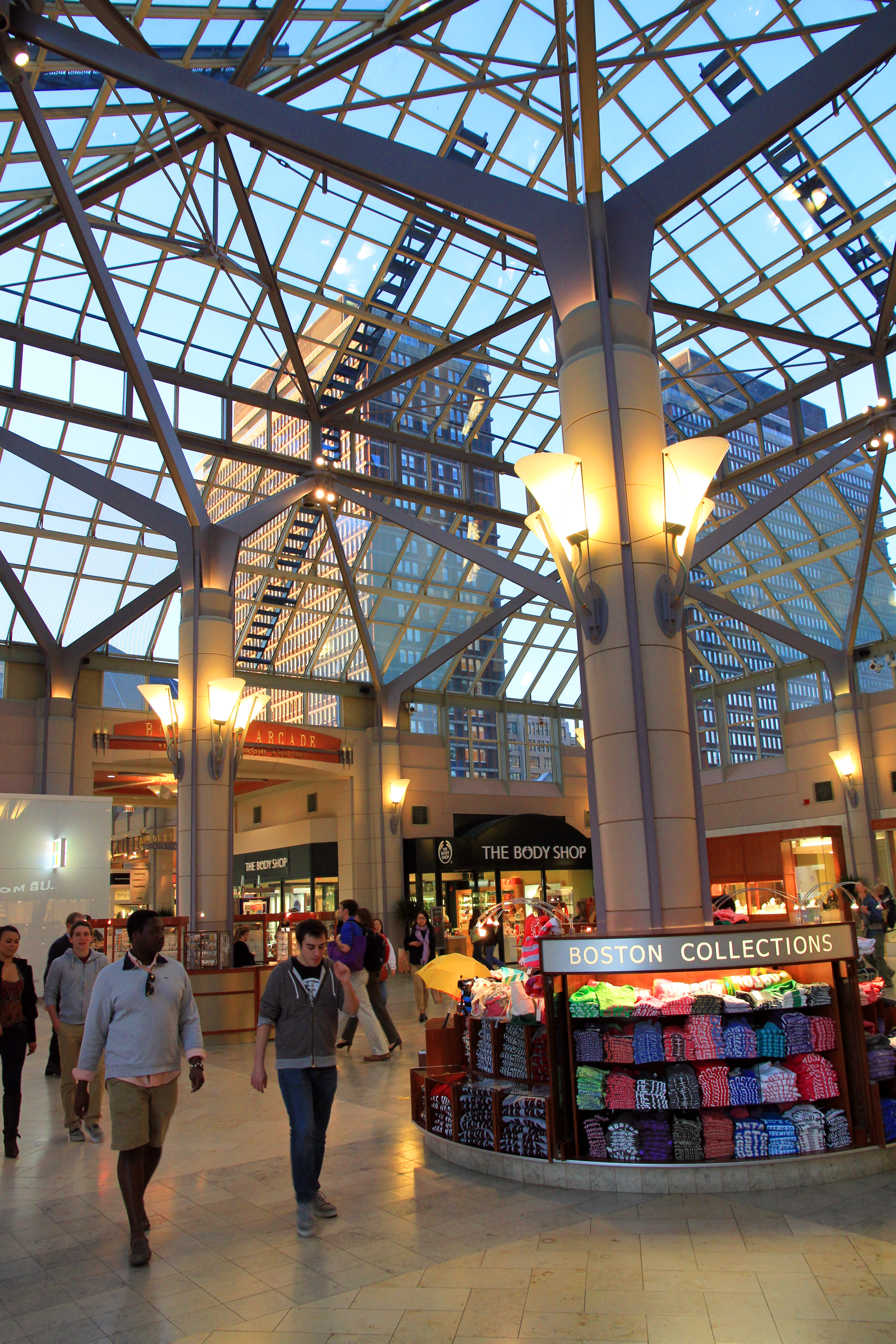
Pedestrian crossroads inside mall

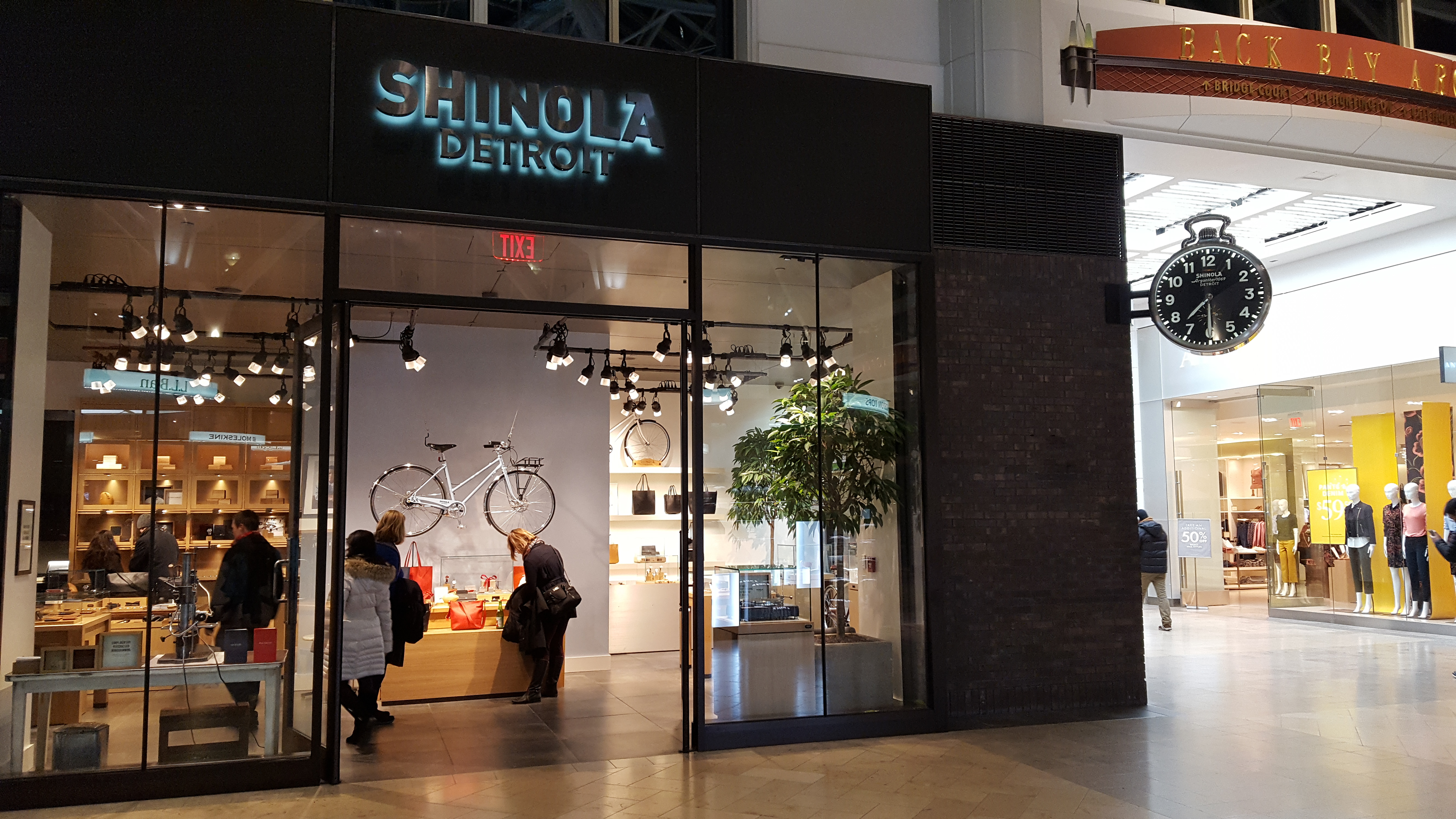
Shinola retail location (2017)

View of the Prudential Tower from The Shops at Prudential Center (2012)

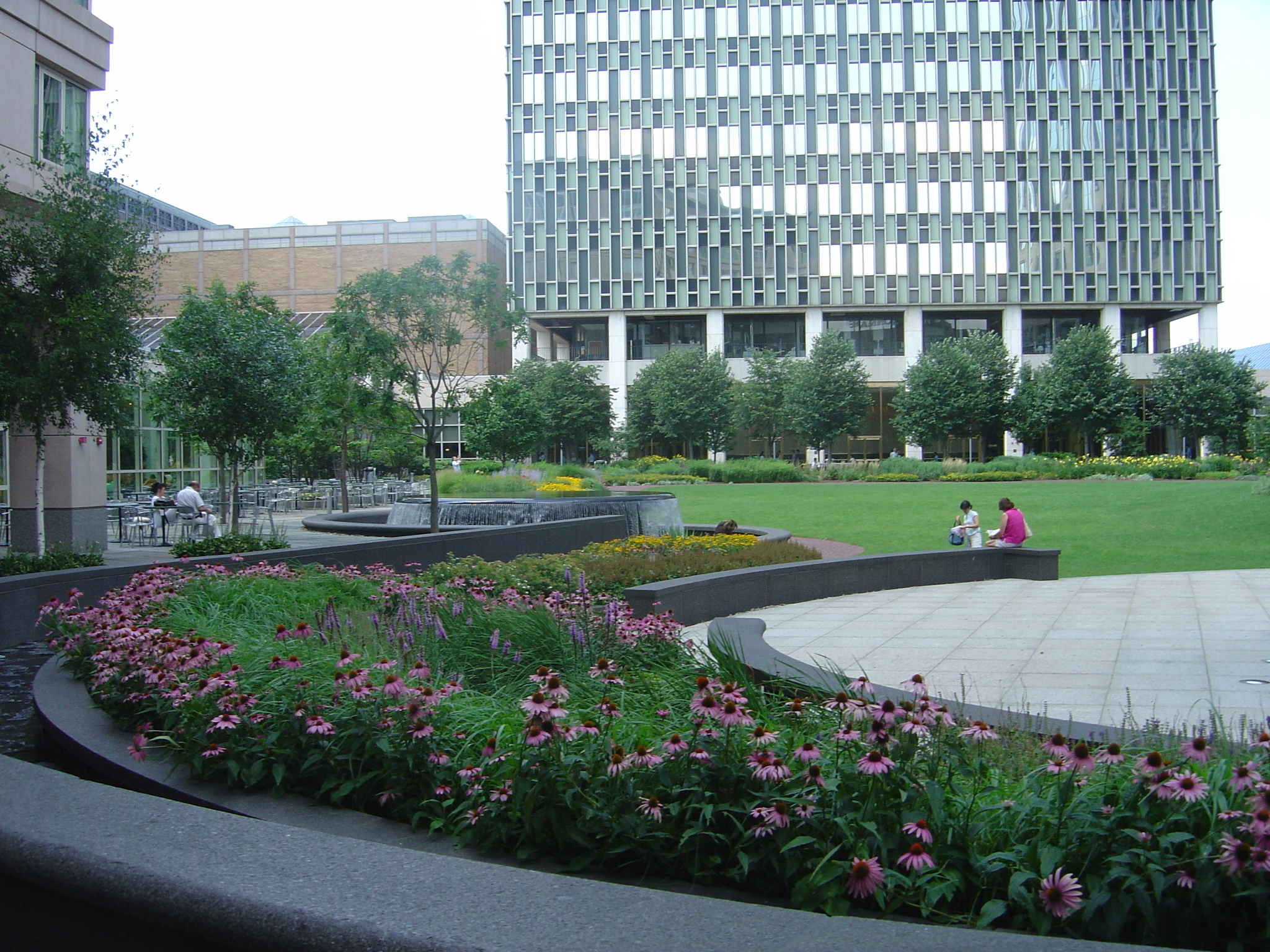
Publicly-accessible outdoors roofdeck garden at base of the Prudential Tower

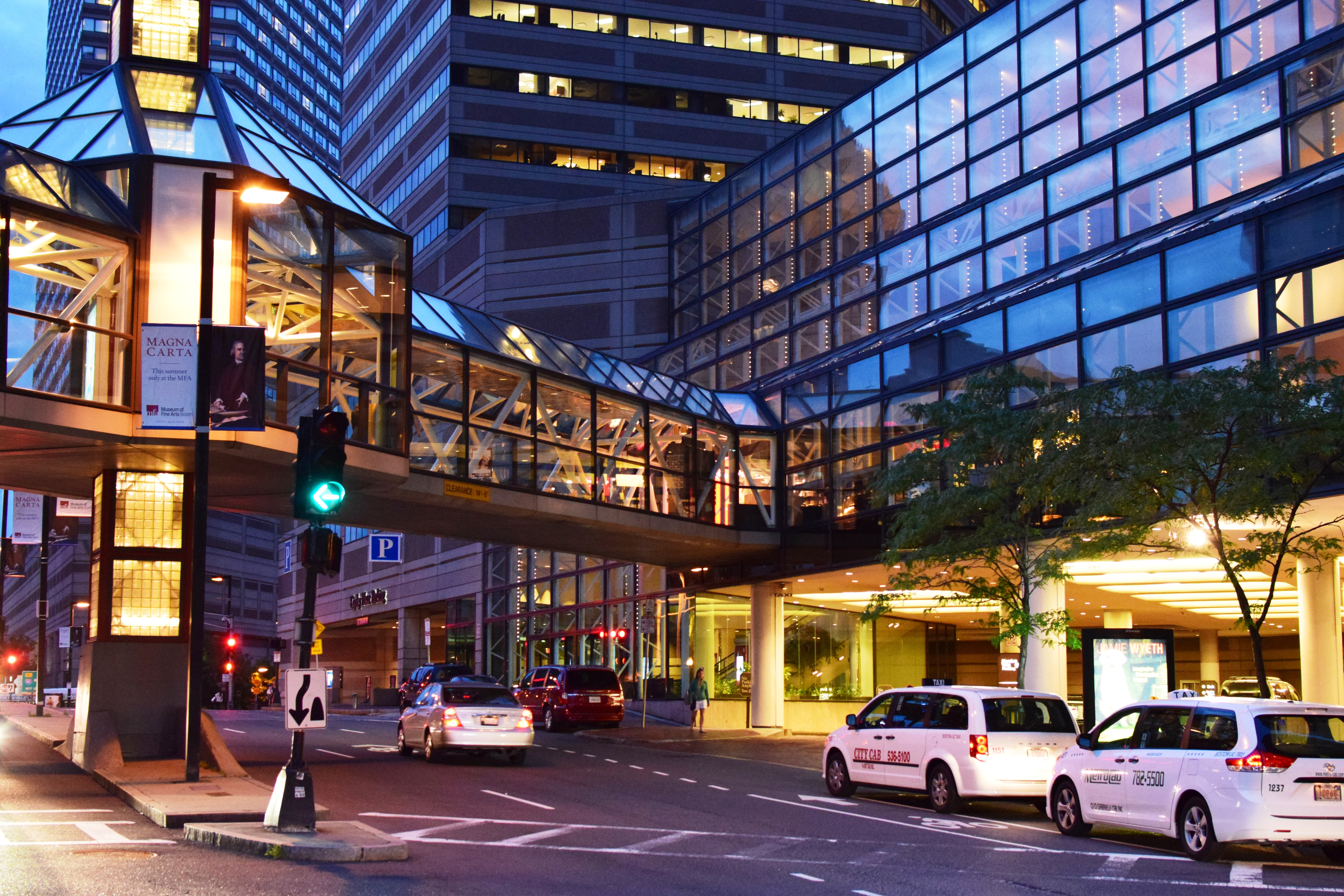
Pedestrian skybridge connects Copley Place mall (at right) to Prudential Center shops

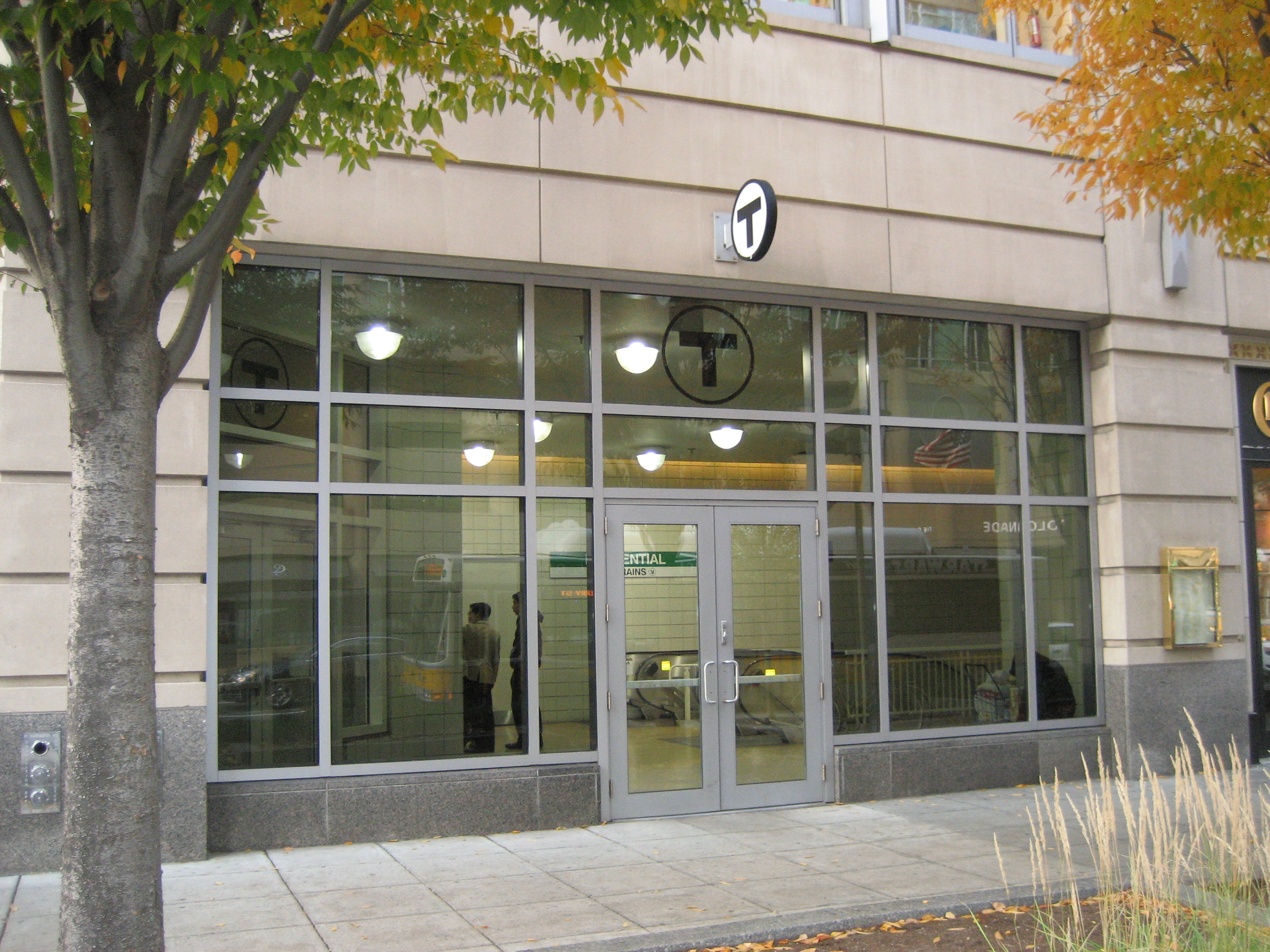
Prudential MBTA subway station entrance at the mall

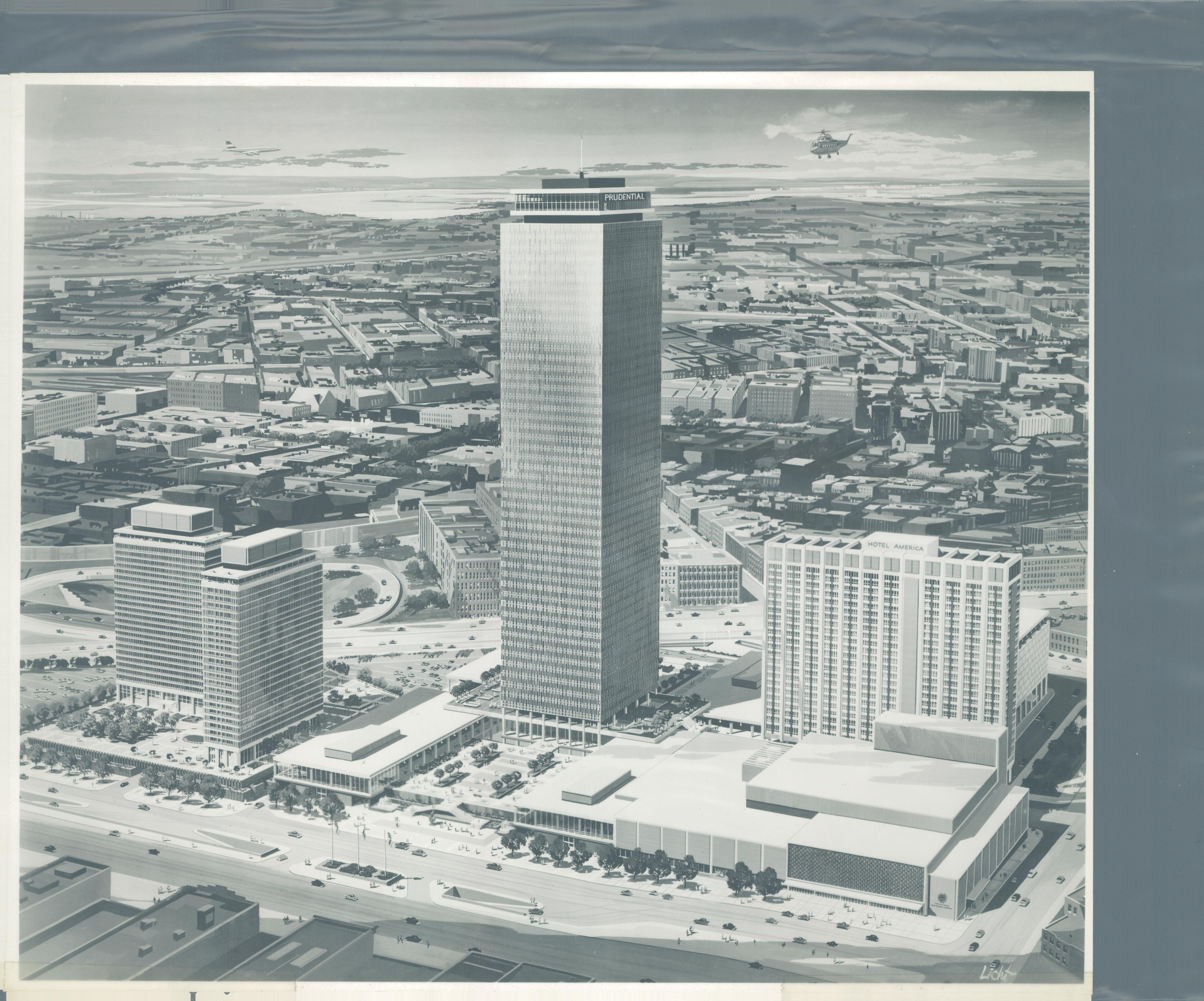
Original architectural rendering shows discrete buildings separated by outdoor plazas
