= 111 Huntington Avenue =

Office building in Boston, Massachusetts

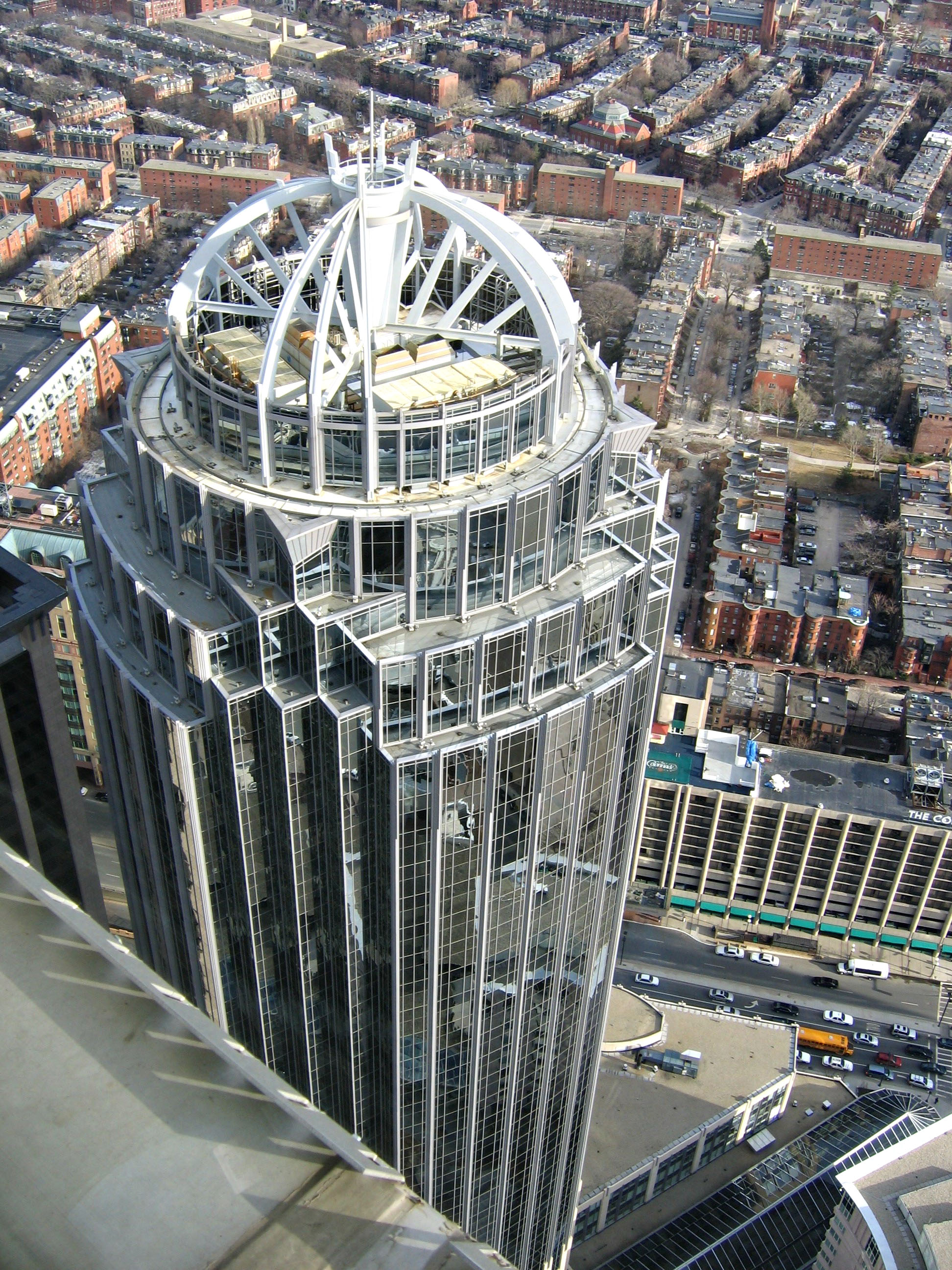
- View of 111 Huntington Avenue from the Prudential Tower observatory
- Interactive map of the 111 Huntington Avenue area

General information
- Type: Office
- Location: 111 Huntington Avenue, Boston, Massachusetts
- Coordinates: 42°20′48.38″N 71°04′52.86″W
- Completed: 2001

Height
- Roof: 554 ft (169 m)

Technical details
- Floor count: 36
- Floor area: 889,228 sq ft (82,612.0 m^{2})

Design and construction
- Architect: CBT Architects
- Developer: Boston Properties, Inc.

111 Huntington Avenue is a skyscraper on Huntington Avenue in Boston, Massachusetts, United States. It is part of the Prudential Center complex that also houses the Prudential Tower. Completed in 2002, the tower is 554 feet (169 meters) tall and houses 36 floors. It is Boston's 13th-tallest building. Its recognizable dome gives the tower the unofficial nicknames of The R2-D2 Building and the Juicer Building.

== Design ==
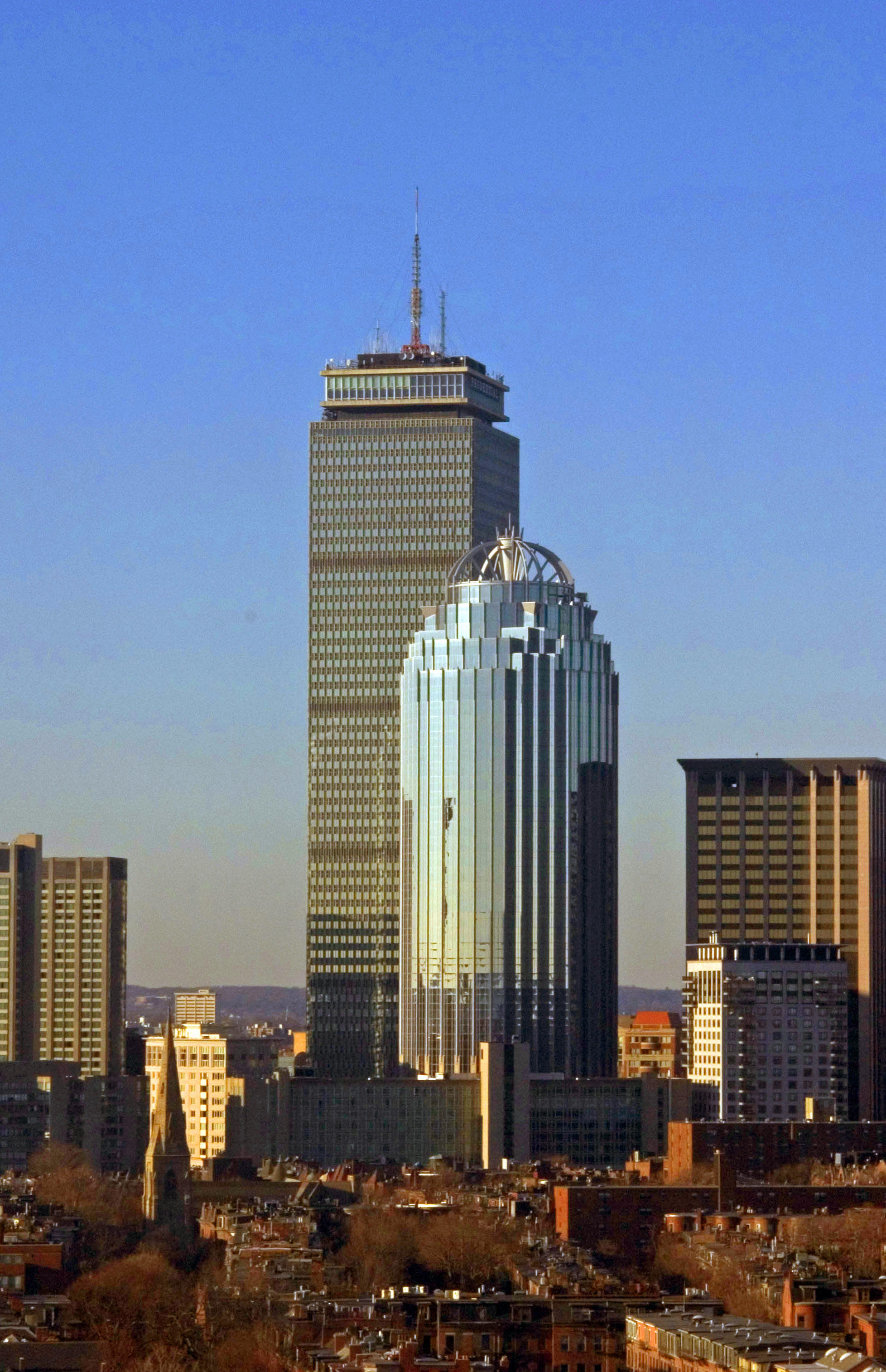
111 Huntington Avenue is seen unobstructed from the South End in Boston. Behind it is the Prudential Tower.

The 36-story tower, constructed by John Moriarty & Associates, Inc, is capped by an open-frame dome and crown which is illuminated at night. The building's original design called for a flat roof, but Boston Mayor Thomas Menino objected; Menino chose the present design from among several options the developer subsequently proposed.

The postmodern facade consists of a blue glass curtain wall designed by the architect firm Childs Bertman Tseckares Inc. (CBT). The lobby interior consists of reflective black marble walls with finished wood paneling and a dramatic lobby waterfall. It can be accessed from the adjacent Prudential retail mall, and includes a number of energy-efficient features.

== Tenants ==
The anchor tenant of the building is the MFS Investment Management company which had reserved 350,000 sq ft (33,000 m^{2}) out of the 890,000 sq ft (83,000 m^{2}) for occupancy as of spring 2013. Other notable tenants include Foley & Lardner LLP, Analysis Group, Edwards Wildman Palmer, Bain Capital, Citi Private Bank and Apple Inc.

== See also ==
- Prudential Tower
- Shops at Prudential Center
- List of tallest buildings in Boston
