= Route 22 (MBTA) =

Bus route in Boston

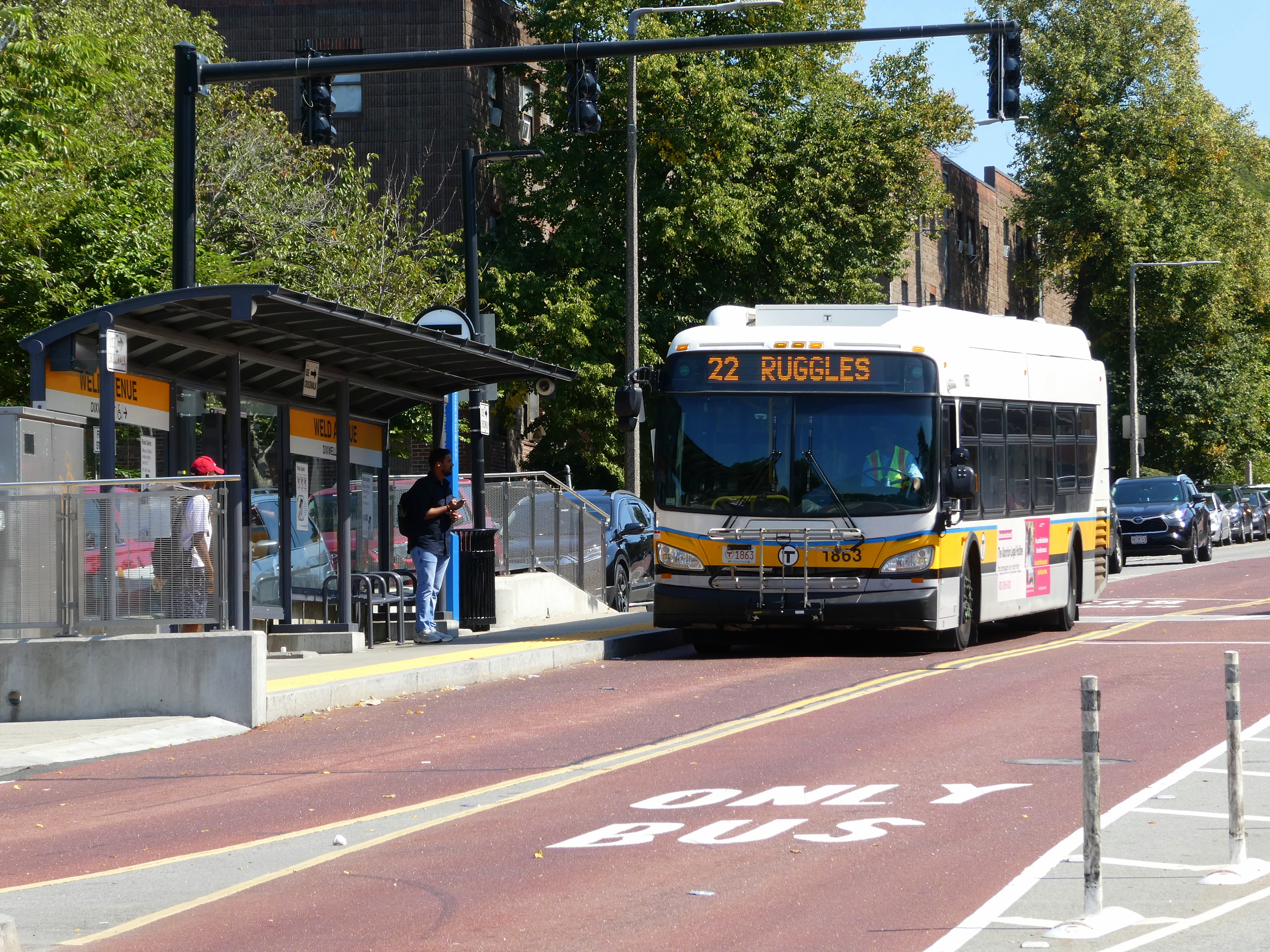
- A route 22 bus on Columbus Avenue in 2024

Overview
- System: MBTA bus
- Garage: Albany Garage and Cabot Garage
- Began service: April 7, 1900 (as streetcar line)

Route
- Locale: Boston, Massachusetts
- Start: Ruggles station
- End: Ashmont station
- Length: 5.59 miles (9.00 km) inbound; 5.36 miles (8.63 km) outbound
- Daily ridership: 8,020 (2018)
- Timetable: Route 22

Route 22 is a local bus route in Boston, Massachusetts, operated by the Massachusetts Bay Transportation Authority (MBTA) as part of MBTA bus service. It operates between Ruggles station and Ashmont station via Columbus Avenue, Seaver Street, Blue Hill Avenue, and Talbot Avenue. It is among the highest-ridership routes in the system, with service every 15 minutes or less during all operating hours.

Route 22 originated from a streetcar line built by the Boston Elevated Railway (BERy) in the early 20th century. The BERy opened a branch from an existing line on Blue Hill Avenue to Codman Square in 1900. It was extended east to Peabody Square in 1905. Several different service patterns were operated during the line's first two decades; after 1919, service operated between Dudley station and Peabody Square via Warren Street and Grove Hall. The service was extended slightly to Ashmont station upon its 1928 opening.

The number 22 was assigned to the service in the early 1940s. The Metropolitan Transit Authority (MTA), successor to the BERy, converted route 22 to trolleybuses in 1949 as part of a larger conversion of the Roxbury/Dorchester network. It was converted to diesel buses in 1962. In 1987, the MBTA rerouted the service to Ruggles station via Seaver Street as part of changes associated with the opening of the Southwest Corridor. Center-running bus lanes opened on a segment of Columbus Avenue in 2021; a second segment is planned. As part of systemwide network changes, the northern end of route 22 is planned to be rerouted to the Longwood Medical Area in the late 2020s.

== Route ==
Route 22 runs between Ruggles station and Ashmont station through the Roxbury and Dorchester neighborhoods of Boston. From the busway at Ashmont station, it runs north on Dorchester Avenue to Peabody Square, then north and west on Talbot Avenue through Codman Square to Blue Hill Avenue. It then runs north on Blue Hill Avenue and northwest on Seaver Street – both part of Massachusetts Route 28 – around Franklin Park. At Walnut Avenue, Seaver Street becomes Columbus Avenue, with center-running bus lanes. The route follows Columbus Avenue northwest and north to the Jackson Square station busway, then continues north in mixed traffic on Columbus Avenue, Tremont Street, and Ruggles Street to the Ruggles station busway. Total distance is 5.59 miles (9.00 km) inbound and 5.36 miles (8.63 km) outbound.

Scheduled one-way running times range from about 35 minutes off-peak to 45 minutes at peak, with shorter times during early mornings and late nights. Service operates from about 5:00 am to 1:00 am Sunday through Thursday and from about 5:00 am to 2:00 am Fridays and Saturdays. Headways are 15 minutes or less at all operating hours (except after 1:00 am on Friday and Saturday nights). MBTA subway connections are available to the Orange Line at Ruggles, Roxbury Crossing, and Jackson Square; and to the Red Line at Ashmont. Connection is also available to the Fairmount Line at Talbot Avenue station.

Route 22 runs as a local route with standard local bus fare. In 2018, the route averaged 8,020 boardings on weekdays, making it the 11th-highest-ridership route in the MBTA bus system. Average weekend ridership was 5,140 on Saturdays and 3,890 on Sundays. The route is operated with standard 40-foot (12 m) transit buses based at Albany Garage and Cabot Garage in Boston. Most of the routing is shared with other MBTA bus routes, including routes 15, 23, 28, 44, and 45 on Tremont Street; routes 29 and 44 on Columbus Avenue and Seaver Street; routes 28 and 29 on Blue Hill Avenue; and routes 23 and 26 on Talbot Avenue east of Codman Square.

== History ==
=== Early history ===
By the late 1890s, Dorchester was served by several radial streetcar lines operated by the Boston Elevated Railway (BERy). They operated primarily north-south on Warren Street, Blue Hill Avenue, Geneva Avenue, Bowdoin Street, and Dorchester Avenue. On July 3, 1899, the city granted permission to the BERy to construct tracks on Talbot Avenue between Blue Hill Avenue and Washington Street (at Codman Square). The tracks were largely complete by the end of the year, but rails for the connections at each end were backordered. Service began on April 7, 1900. Streetcars operated from Ashmont Street Carhouse to Park Street station via Washington Street, Talbot Avenue, Blue Hill Avenue, Warren Street, Dudley Street, Shawmut Street, and the Tremont Street subway.

The Main Line Elevated opened on June 10, 1901, with Dudley Street Terminal as the southern terminus of the Washington Street Elevated. Some streetcar routes terminated at Dudley, where passengers could transfer to the faster elevated trains, while others continued to operate into the downtown subway. On November 18, 1905, the line was extended 2,955 feet (901 m) along Talbot Avenue to Peabody Square. The extension did not connect to existing tracks on Dorchester Avenue at Peabody Square. On August 11, 1906, the Dudley Street Terminal–Peabody Square route was changed to run via Dudley Street and Blue Hill Avenue – rather than Warren Street – between Dudley Square and Grove Hall.

=== Streetcar changes ===
The Talbot Avenue service overlaid in blue ( ) on a 1921 system map, with key locations marked. The pre-1917 routing to Park Street via Columbus Avenue, the 1917–1918 routing to Egleston, and the 1918–1919 routing to Dudley via Egleston are shown in orange ( ).

In 1907, service on Talbot Avenue consisted of the Dudley–Peabody Square route, plus a route between Ashmont Street Carhouse and Dudley via Washington Street, Talbot Avenue, Blue Hill Avenue, Seaver Street, and Humboldt Avenue. Most service on the latter route terminated on Blue Hill Avenue at Franklin Field at the west end of Talbot Avenue. The Washington Street Elevated was extended south to Forest Hills on November 22, 1909. An intermediate station, Egleston, was located at Columbus Avenue. On April 2, 1910, an existing North Station–Franklin Park route via Columbus Avenue was extended to Peabody Square via Talbot Avenue. Within several years, it operated only at peak hours, but it was changed to all-day service in mid-1913. On August 14, 1915, the route was cut back from North Station to Park Street; it was rerouted through the Back Bay via Massachusetts Avenue and Huntington Avenue. Additional rush hour service was added on the Egleston–Peabody Square segment.

A surface transfer station at Egleston station opened on January 20, 1917. The Humboldt Avenue line was cut back to Seaver Street at that time. In 1917, the Park Street–Peabody Square route operated every 10 minutes; no direct Dudley–Peabody Square service was run. On December 15, 1917, the Cambridge–Dorchester Line was extended south to Broadway station in South Boston, promoting a reconfiguration of Dorchester streetcar routes. All Talbot Avenue service ran between Egleston station and Peabody Square. The Cambridge–Dorchester Line was extended again to Andrew station on June 29, 1918. The Egleston–Peabody Square route was extended to Dudley via Washington Street, replacing the northern portion of the Lotus Place–Dudley route.

On September 13, 1919, the Peabody Square service was redirected to run to Dudley more directly via Grove Hall and Warren Street. The discontinued section continued to be served by the Egleston–Mattapan service and an extension of Humboldt Avenue service. By late 1920, the Peabody Square–Dudley service operated every 7–8 minutes at peak hours and every 10 minutes at other times, requiring a maximum of eight streetcars. Around 1923, the Talbot Avenue tracks were connected to the Dorchester Avenue tracks at Peabody Square. Although the Talbot Avenue line was double tracked, the connector was only single track so as to skirt the edge of the structurally questionable bridge over the Shawmut Branch. The purpose of the connector was to allow access to the Milton carhouse, as the former route via Codman Street was abandoned in 1921. Contrary to previous plans, regular Talbot Avenue service was not extended to Milton.

Further extension of the Cambridge–Dorchester Line over the Shawmut Branch took place in the late 1920s. The work included reconstruction of the Peabody Square bridge, allowing a two-track connection from Talbot Avenue to Dorchester Avenue. The rapid transit line opened to Ashmont station on the south side of Peabody Square on September 1, 1928. The Talbot Avenue service was extended slightly to terminate at the new station. On September 22, 1928, the BERy began bus service between Ashmont station and Gallivan Boulevard, which used Talbot Avenue between Codman Square and Peabody Square. It was joined on that segment by the Fields Corner belt line bus on February 16, 1929. After conversion of the Norfolk Street line to buses in August 1929, both Washington Street streetcar service and Norfolk Street bus service also used Talbot Avenue east of Codman Square.

=== 1940s and trolleybus conversion ===
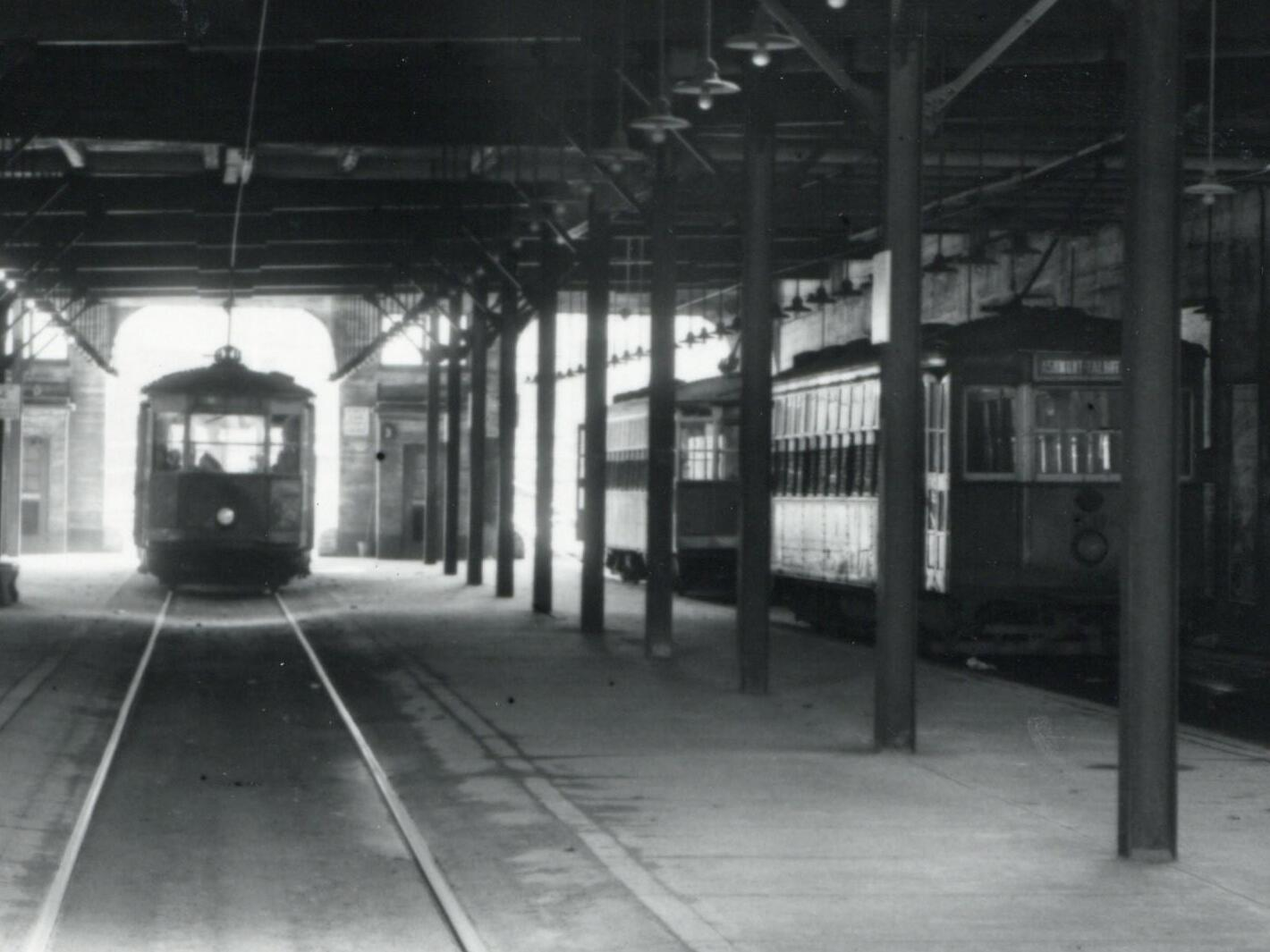
Three streetcars at Ashmont station around 1947, with a route 22 car at right

In 1940–41, the BERy reassigned the public route numbers used for its services; those numbers have remained relatively consistent since. The Dudley–Ashmont route via Talbot Avenue was numbered 22. The southern terminal of route 22 was at Ashmont station, where inbound streetcars had a cross-platform transfer with rapid transit trains. They turned north onto Dorchester Avenue, then ran north and west on Talbot Avenue to Blue Hill Avenue. Streetcars ran in a dedicated reservation on Blue Hill Avenue as far north as Washington Street in Grove Hall. A block north, they turned northwest to follow Warren Street to Dudley Street Terminal, where they used the eastern elevated loop track. Outbound streetcars returning to Ashmont station had a cross-platform transfer at the northbound platform, then looped around the north end of the station to reach the southbound platform. Round-trip running time was scheduled for 47 minutes. The Blue Hill Avenue reservation was removed between American Legion Highway and Charlotte Street in November 1940, and between Charlotte Street and Columbia Road in November 1941. Thereafter, streetcars on that segment operated in mixed traffic as they did on the rest of the line.

In the 1940s, route 22 used Type 5 streetcars (Note: Type 5 streetcars, built between 1922 and 1928, represented about half of the BERy's fleet in the 1940s.) based at Park Street Carhouse adjacent to Fields Corner station. In April 1945, the line ran every 5 minutes during the morning peak, every 10 minutes during midday, every 5.5 minutes during the afternoon peak, and every 12 minutes during the evening, for a total of 139 daily round trips. Rush hour service required 12 streetcars in the morning and 13 in the afternoon. The northern portion of Warren Street, served by route 19 (Fields Corner–Dudley via Geneva Avenue), route 22, route 23 (Ashmont–Dudley via Washington Street), and route 44 (Seaver Street Loop–Dudley), was tied for the most service in the system. It had 605 daily round trips, with headways of 0.9 minutes at morning peak and 1.0 minute in the afternoon peak. (Note: Massachusetts Avenue in Cambridge between Harvard station and North Cambridge carhouse also had 605 daily round trips.) The route did not have all-night "Owl" service, though all portions except the Blue Hill Avenue–Codman Square segment of Talbot Avenue were part of Owl service on other routes. (Note: Prior to the 1929 rerouting of Washington Street service over Talbot Avenue, the portion east of Codman Square also lacked Owl service.)

The Metropolitan Transit Authority (MTA) replaced the BERy in 1947. The next year, the MTA began work to convert the remaining streetcar lines in Roxbury and Dorchester to trolleybuses – an expansion of the area's trolleybus network. Construction of double overhead lines began in early 1948. Various facilities were modified for use by trolleybuses, including Park Street Carhouse and Ashmont station. The most significant changes took place at Dudley Street Terminal, where the east loop was completely rebuilt. Beginning on July 16, 1948, streetcar routes including route 22 were temporarily diverted to the west loop to allow construction to take place. Routes 19, 22, and 23 were all converted to trolleybuses on January 8, 1949. The tracks were removed that year, except for the portion on Blue Hill Avenue south of Seaver Street, which remained in use by route 29 until 1955.

=== Bus conversion and the MBTA ===
Beginning in June 1954, evening service was routed via Blue Hill Avenue and Dudley Street between Grove Hall and Dudley Street Terminal, replacing route 45 service during those hours. The Roxbury/Dorchester trolleybus system was operated with buses on Sundays beginning on November 11, 1957; some routes also used buses on Saturdays. Most of the remaining trackless trolley routes were converted to buses between 1961 and 1963. (Note: Longtime general manager Edward Dana, who retired in 1959, had been a proponent of trackless trolleys. His successor, Thomas McLernon, saw them as antiquated and moved to replace them with buses.) The MTA planned to convert the Roxbury/Dorchester trolleybus system to buses on March 31, 1962. The planned conversion was one of several labor issues that led to a two-day strike by the Boston Carmen's Union on March 31 and April 1. A compromise agreement delayed the start of the spring schedule, including the bus conversion, to April 6.

The Massachusetts Bay Transportation Authority (MBTA) replaced the MTA in 1964, with route 22 becoming part of the MBTA bus network. Weekday and Saturday evening service resumed operating via Warren Street in December 1966, followed by Sunday evening service in June 1976. (Note: One daily trip remained combined with route 45 until December 2025.) On May 2, 1987, a number of MBTA bus routes were modified as the Orange Line was relocated from the Washington Street Elevated to the Southwest Corridor. Route 22 was rerouted to Ruggles station – which replaced Dudley as the bus bus terminal for the Roxbury/Dorchester area – via Seaver Street, Columbus Avenue, Jackson Square station, and Tremont Street. The Seaver Street portion supplemented route 29, while routes 22 and 29 replaced route 43 on the portion between Egleston and Ruggles. A new Mattapan–Dudley–Ruggles service, route 28, replaced route 22 service on Warren Street.

=== 21st century ===
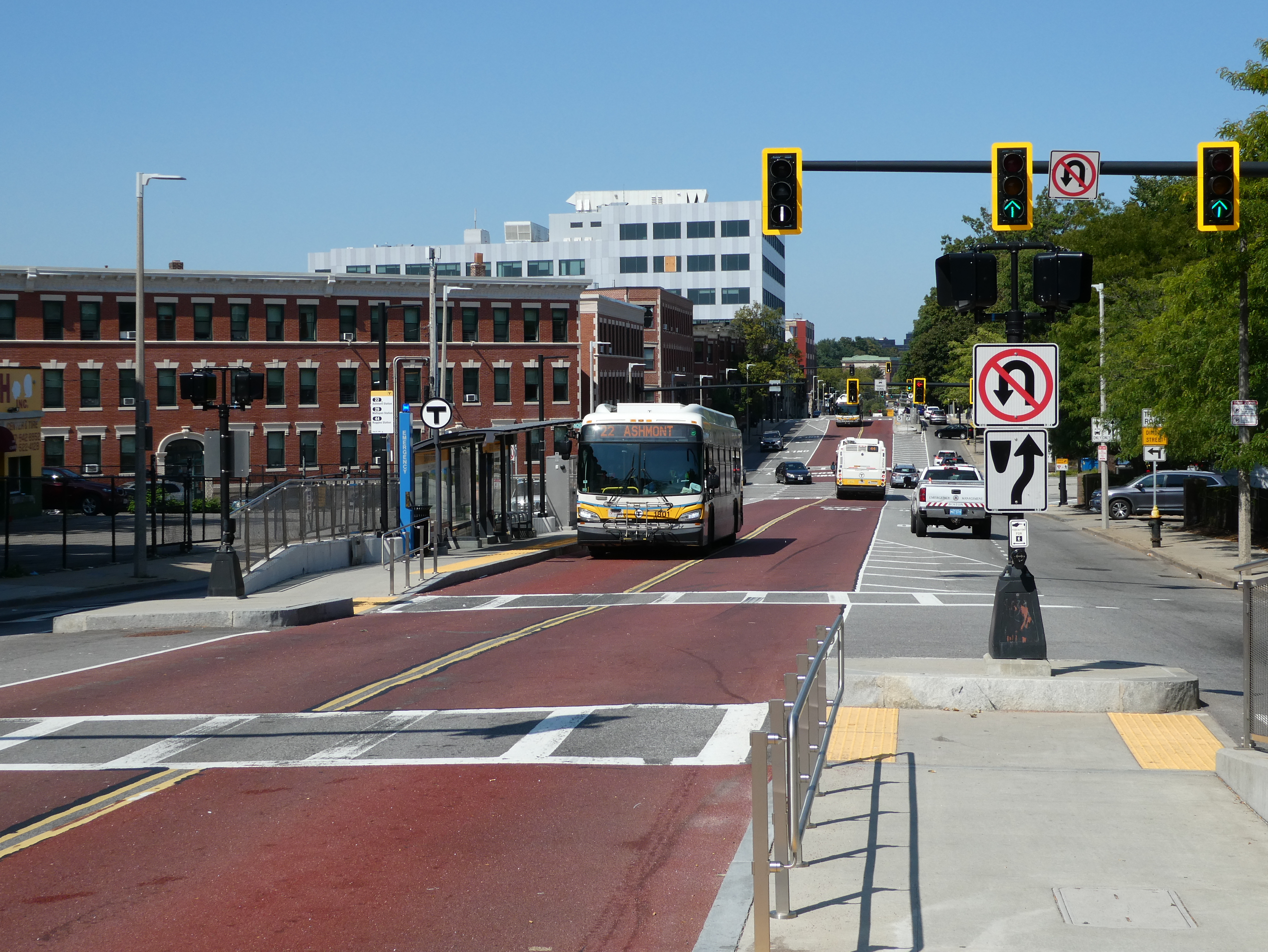
A route 22 bus on the 2021-opened bus lanes

At the turn of the century, route 22 was the 9th-busiest MBTA bus route with 8,349 weekday riders. In 2004–2005, the MBTA designated a set of 15 high-ridership routes, including route 22, as "key bus routes" to be prioritized for service improvements. The first round of adjustments, made in 2006–07, did not include significant changes to route 22. A second round of changes to the key routes were funded by the American Recovery and Reinvestment Act of 2009. Recommendations for route 22 released in 2012 included wider stop spacing, lengthening of stops to allow buses to pull fully to the curb, and additional amenities at stops. The 68 existing stops (34 per direction) were to be reduced to 60, including several on segments shared with routes 23 and 28. Implementation of the changes took place in 2013.

Beginning March 28, 2014, the MBTA added late-night service on Friday and Saturday nights. This consisted of service until 2:30 am on the subway system and the key bus routes. The late-night service was eliminated on five routes, including route 22, in June 2015; it lasted until March 2016 on the other routes. A 2018–19 MBTA review of its bus system found that route 22 had some issues with service quality but overall performed better than other key bus routes. Overall reliability was 75% on weekdays, largely caused by running times being longer than scheduled; the schedule was adjusted as a result. No other near-term changes were proposed. Most MBTA bus routes, including route 22, were placed on a Saturday schedule effective March 17, 2020, due to the COVID-19 pandemic. Regular service levels on a number of routes, including route 22, resumed on June 21, 2020.

In October 2020, the MBTA and the City of Boston began construction of center-running bus lanes on Columbus Avenue between Jackson Square station and Walnut Avenue via Egleston Square. This included boarding islands at eight bus stops (four per direction) used by routes 22, 29, and 44. The first center-running bus lanes in New England, they opened on October 30, 2021 at a cost of $14 million. A city study found that the lanes saved an average of one minute per one-way bus trip, with an average of 3.5 minutes at peak hours, while auto travel times increased by 20–40 seconds. By 2025, center-running bus lanes on Tremont Street for route 15 and other routes were planned to be constructed in 2026. In March 2026, Streetsblog reported that Boston mayor Michelle Wu's administration was delaying approval of the project, putting $34 million in federal funding at risk.

In May 2022, the MBTA released a draft plan for a systemwide network redesign. The draft called for route 22 to be rerouted north of Roxbury Crossing station to terminate in the Longwood Medical Area rather than at Ruggles. It would be a frequent route, with headways of 15 minutes or less at all operating hours. A revised proposal in November 2022 called for the same change. A 2024 report by advocacy group TransitMatters rated route 22 the fourth-most-bunched MBTA bus route in 2023, with 15.5% of trips experiencing bus bunching. This decreased to 14.6% in 2024. Service changes effective August 24, 2025, increased route 22 frequency to every 15 minutes or less during all operating hours. Service also began operating about one hour longer on Friday and Saturday evenings.
