= Ruggles station =

Transit hub in Boston, Massachusetts, US

Ruggles
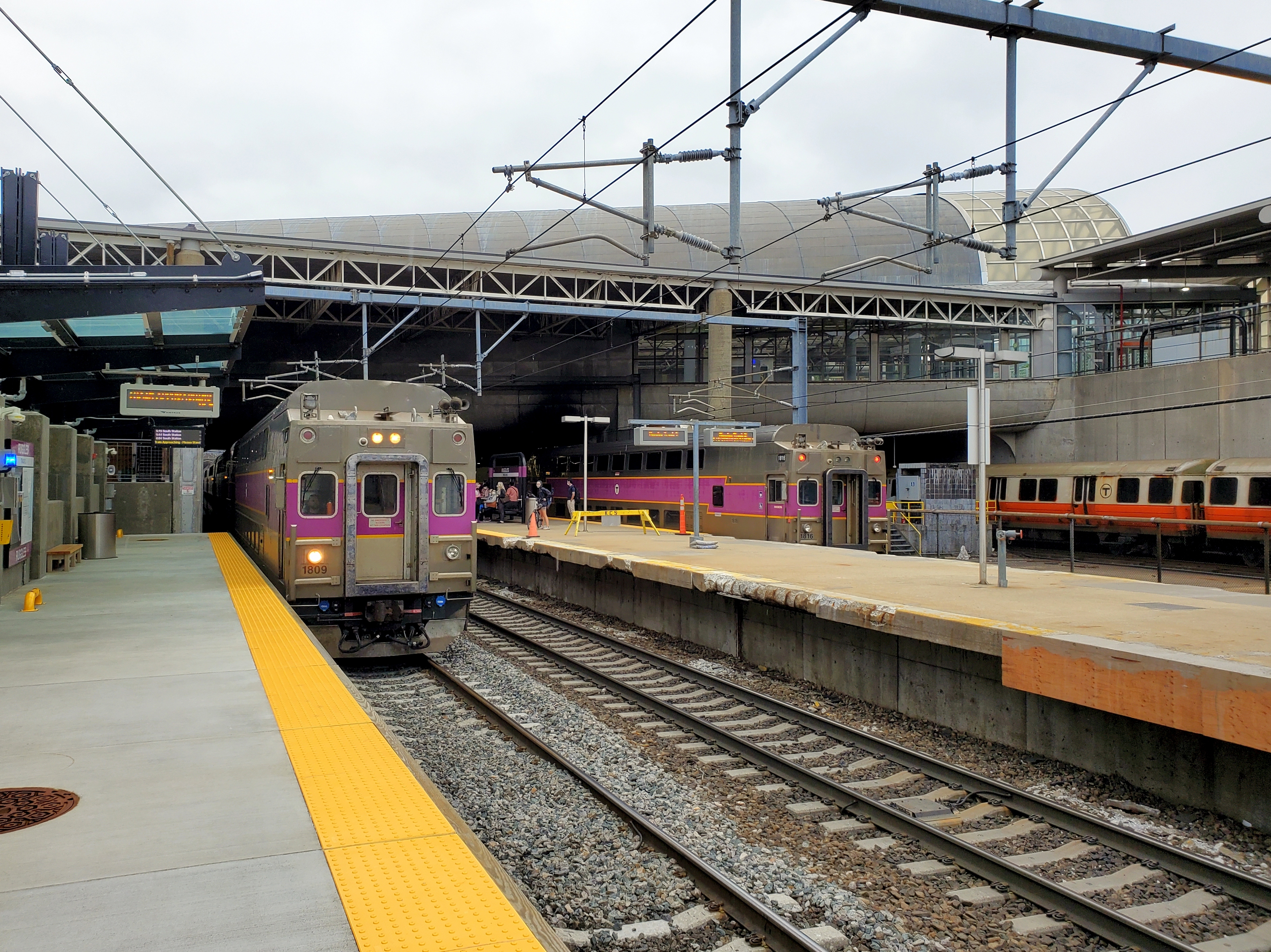
- Commuter Rail and Orange Line trains at Ruggles in 2021

General information
- Location: Ruggles Street at Tremont Street; Roxbury, Boston, Massachusetts
- Coordinates: 42.3366°N 71.0892°W
- Lines: Attleboro Line (Northeast Corridor, Southwest Corridor)
- Platforms: 1 island platform (Orange Line); 1 side platform, 1 island platform (Northeast Corridor)
- Tracks: 2 (Orange Line); 3 (Northeast Corridor)
- Connections: MBTA bus: 8, 15, 19, 22, 23, 28, 43, 44, 45, 47, 85, CT3; Mission Hill Link

Construction
- Cycle facilities: 12 spaces
- Accessible: Yes

Other information
- Fare zone: 1A (Commuter Rail)

History
- Opened: May 4, 1987 (Orange Line); October 5, 1987 (Commuter Rail)
- Rebuilt: 2017–2021; 2025–2028

Passengers
- 2024: 3,166 daily boardings (Commuter Rail)
- FY2019: 9,199 daily boardings (Orange Line)

Services
Preceding station	MBTA	Following station
Forest Hills limited service toward Forge Park/495 or Foxboro	Franklin/Foxboro Line weekdays	Back Bay toward South Station
Forest Hills toward Needham Heights	Needham Line	Back Bay toward South Station
Forest Hills limited service toward Wickford Junction or Stoughton	Providence/Stoughton Line	Back Bay toward South Station
Roxbury Crossing toward Forest Hills	Orange Line	Massachusetts Avenue toward Oak Grove
Proposed services
Preceding station	MBTA	Following station
Hyde Park toward Battleship Cove or New Bedford	South Coast Rail Phase 2 (2030)	Back Bay toward South Station
Track layout
Location

Ruggles station is an intermodal transfer station in Boston, Massachusetts. It serves Massachusetts Bay Transportation Authority (MBTA) rapid transit, bus, and commuter rail services and is located at the intersection of Ruggles and Tremont streets, where the Roxbury, Fenway–Kenmore, and Mission Hill neighborhoods meet. It is surrounded by the campus of Northeastern University. Ruggles is a station stop for the Orange Line subway, as well as the Providence/Stoughton Line, Franklin/Foxboro Line, and Needham Line of the MBTA Commuter Rail system. Thirteen MBTA bus routes stop at Ruggles.

Ruggles station opened in 1987 as part of the Southwest Corridor, replacing Dudley Street Terminal as the main bus transfer station for much of Roxbury and Dorchester. The station originally had a single island platform serving the Northeast Corridor tracks, which meant not all commuter rail trains could stop at the station. Construction of an additional side platform, replacements of four elevators, and reconstruction of the busway took place from 2017 to 2021. A second phase, which will add additional entrances to the Orange Line and commuter rail platforms plus make the Columbus Avenue entrance accessible, is taking place from 2025 to 2028.

== Station layout ==
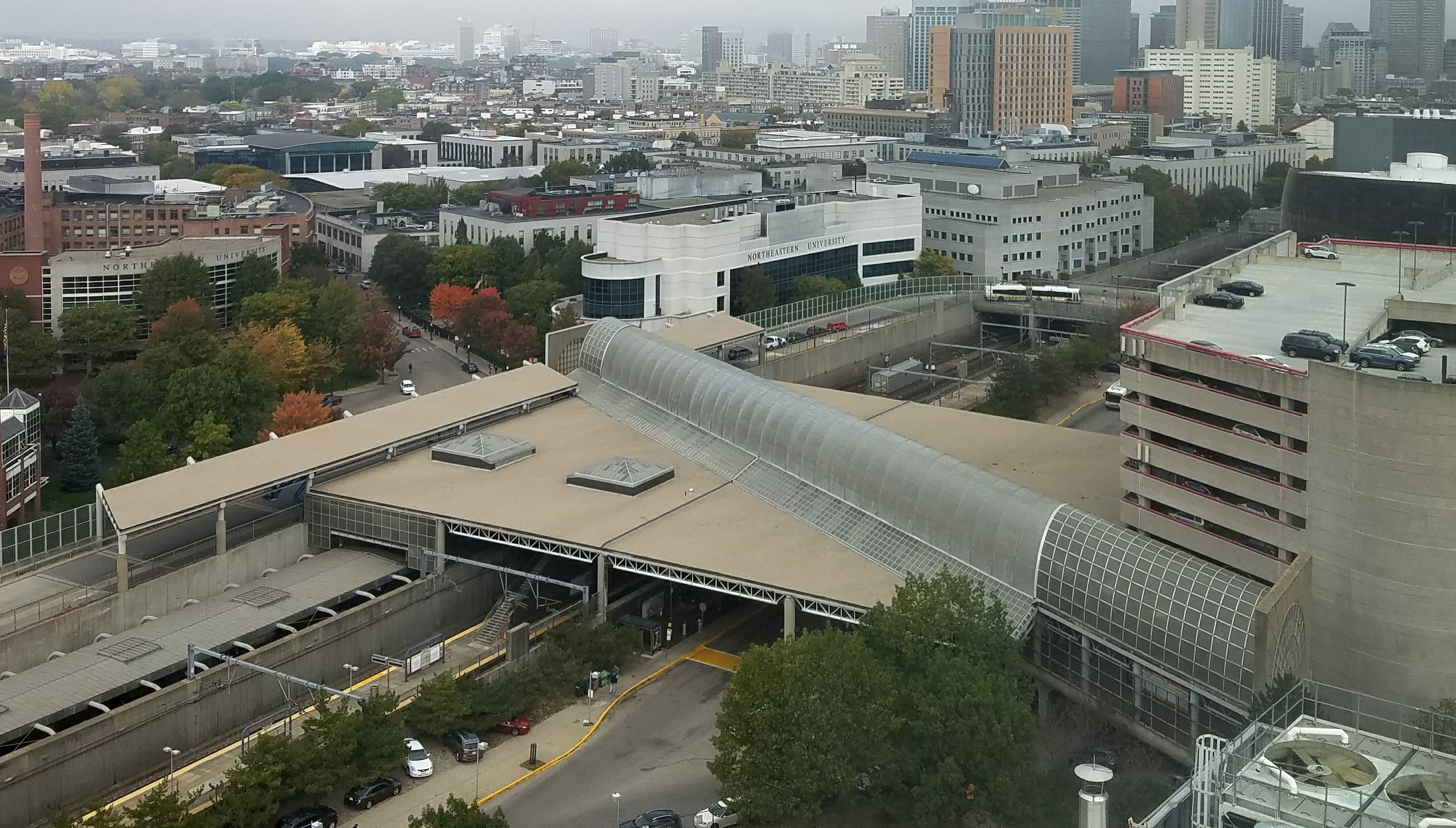
The station seen from the southwest

The sprawling station is elevated above the Southwest Corridor north of Ruggles Street and west of Columbus Avenue - the former location of the South End Grounds. The main station structure, designed by Stull and Lee, is covered by a rectangular "tubular-framed, high-tech" canopy. The arched concourse crosses at an angle aligned with Forsyth Street, with entrances at both ends. Its open ends were intended to symbolize reconnection between Jamaica Plain and Roxbury, historically divided by the railroad alignment.

A clockwise busway wraps around the station, with separate entrances and exits on Ruggles Street, plus an entrance from Melnea Cass Boulevard at Columbus Avenue. The north (upper) part of the busway is level with the concourse and used for drop-offs; the south (lower) part has multiple lanes and bus berths for boarding. A Northeastern University architecture studio is located in the station structure under the upper busway, next to the Forsyth Street entrance. Ruggles is served by MBTA bus routes 8, 15, 19, 22, 23, 28, 43, 44, 45, 47, 85, and CT3.

A total of five tracks run through the station: two for the Orange Line and three for commuter rail (and Amtrak, which does not stop). The Orange Line tracks serve a single island platform on the north side of the railroad cut. The northern two of the mainline tracks serve a second island platform, while the southernmost track has a side platform. The entrances to the two island platforms are located on the west side of the concourse, under the canopy; entrances to the side platform are from the busway and from a walkway from Columbus Avenue. Five elevators connect the concourse level to the two platforms, the busway, and the Forsyth Street entrance.

=== Artwork ===
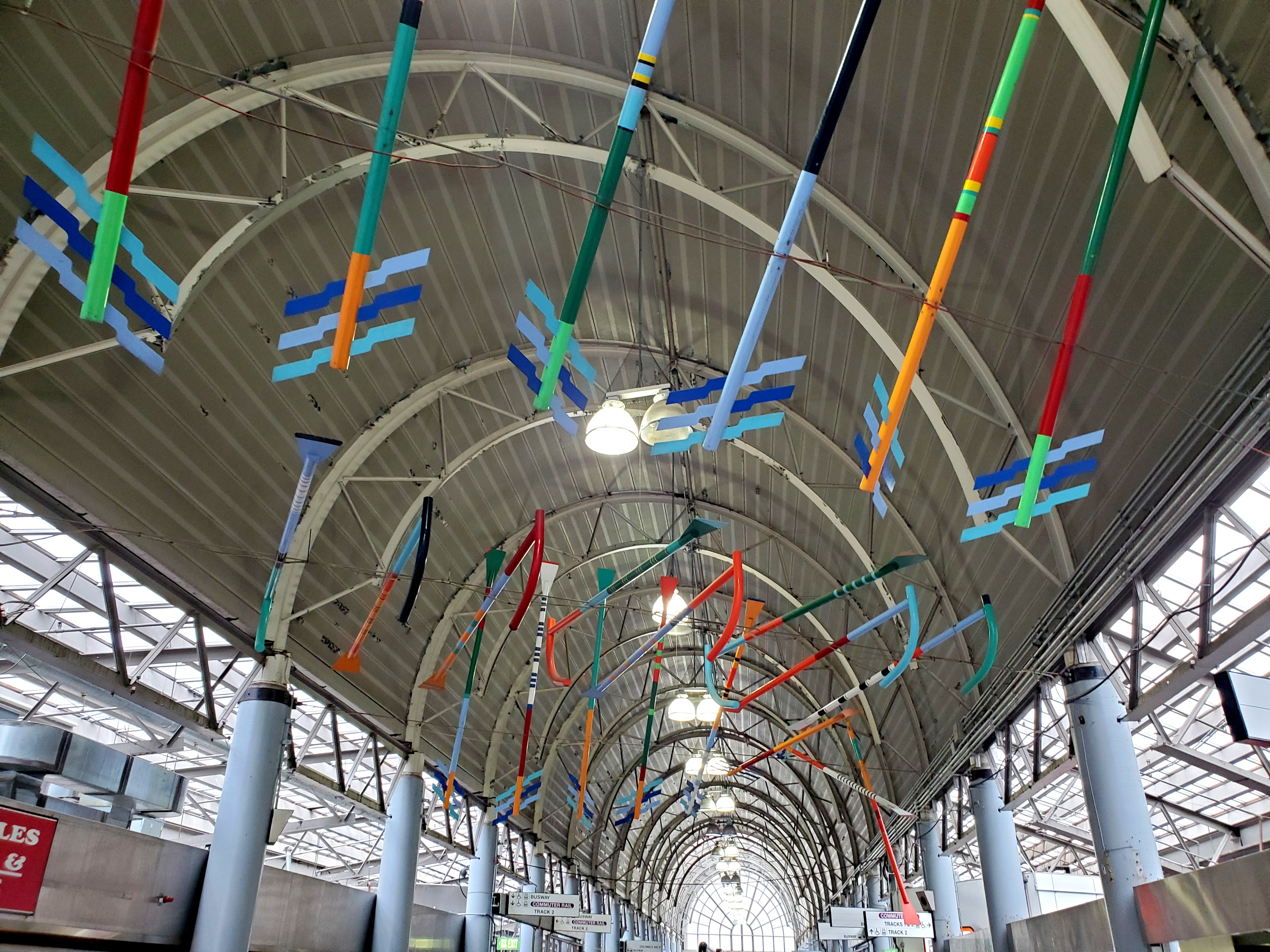
Stony Brook Dance in 2021

Two "very different" pieces of public art were installed in the station as part of the Arts on the Line program:

- Stony Brook Dance, by John T. Scott, is an aluminum abstract kinetic sculpture suspended inside the west end of the concourse. Thirty colorful geometric tubes are attached to three stainless steel cables, allowing them to sway in the wind. The work, commissioned in 1986 and completed in 1989, combines imagery of diddley bows and wave physics.
- Geom-a-tree, by Paul Goodnight, Elaine Sayoko Yoneoka, Stephanie Jackson St. Germain, and Emmanuel Genovese, is a ceramic tile and stained glass mural located above the eastern exit from the concourse. Twenty-six feet (7.9 m) wide and 5 feet (1.5 m) tall, it forms a colorful collage of Asian and African-American faces and symbols. The work was installed in 1990–91. Painter Goodnight and ceramics artist Yoneoka met in court while the two were separately pursuing lawsuits regarding illegal destruction of their previous works.

Each Southwest Corridor station has two works by local artists engraved on granite pillars. Those at Ruggles are "Harriet Tubman a.k.a. Moses" by Samuel Allen and "Four Letters Home" by Will Holton. "Four Letters Home" consists of fictional letters written as if by immigrants to Roxbury in the 1830s, 1880s, 1920s, and 1960s.

The western wall of the station was covered with a mural by Silvia López Chavez in 2019. The work – part of a Northeastern University art program – depicts a woman blowing bubbles on a brightly colored backdrop.

== History ==
Ruggles station opened on May 4, 1987, and was built as part of an Orange Line realignment project which relocated the former Washington Street Elevated Orange Line service into the Southwest Corridor. Commuter rail service to the station began on October 5, 1987. Located where there had not previously been a station, Ruggles was built to serve Northeastern University and the Longwood Medical Area, and to replace Dudley Square station as a major bus terminal for the Orange Line. Only weekday commuter rail service stopped at Ruggles until May 8, 2000, when weekend service was added.

The busway was originally paved with asphalt, which soon eroded from the stopping and starting of buses. In 1988, the MBTA paid $430,000 to repave it with more-durable concrete. The upper busway was closed for one year ending on February 6, 2006, for a $3.2 million rehabilitation.

The entire Orange Line, including the Orange Line platform at Ruggles station, was closed from August 19 to September 18, 2022, during maintenance work. Commuter Rail and bus service to the station was not affected.

=== Urban Ring proposal ===
Ruggles was a proposed stop on the Urban Ring – a circumferential bus rapid transit (BRT) line designed to connect the existing radial MBTA rail lines to reduce overcrowding in the downtown stations. Under draft plans released in 2008, the Urban Ring would have approached Ruggles from the west on a reserved surface right-of-way on the north side of Ruggles Street. Buses would have used the existing bus loop; the existing side access from Tremont Street would have connected to dedicated bus lanes on Melnea Cass Boulevard. The project was cancelled in 2010.

=== Renovations ===
==== First phase ====
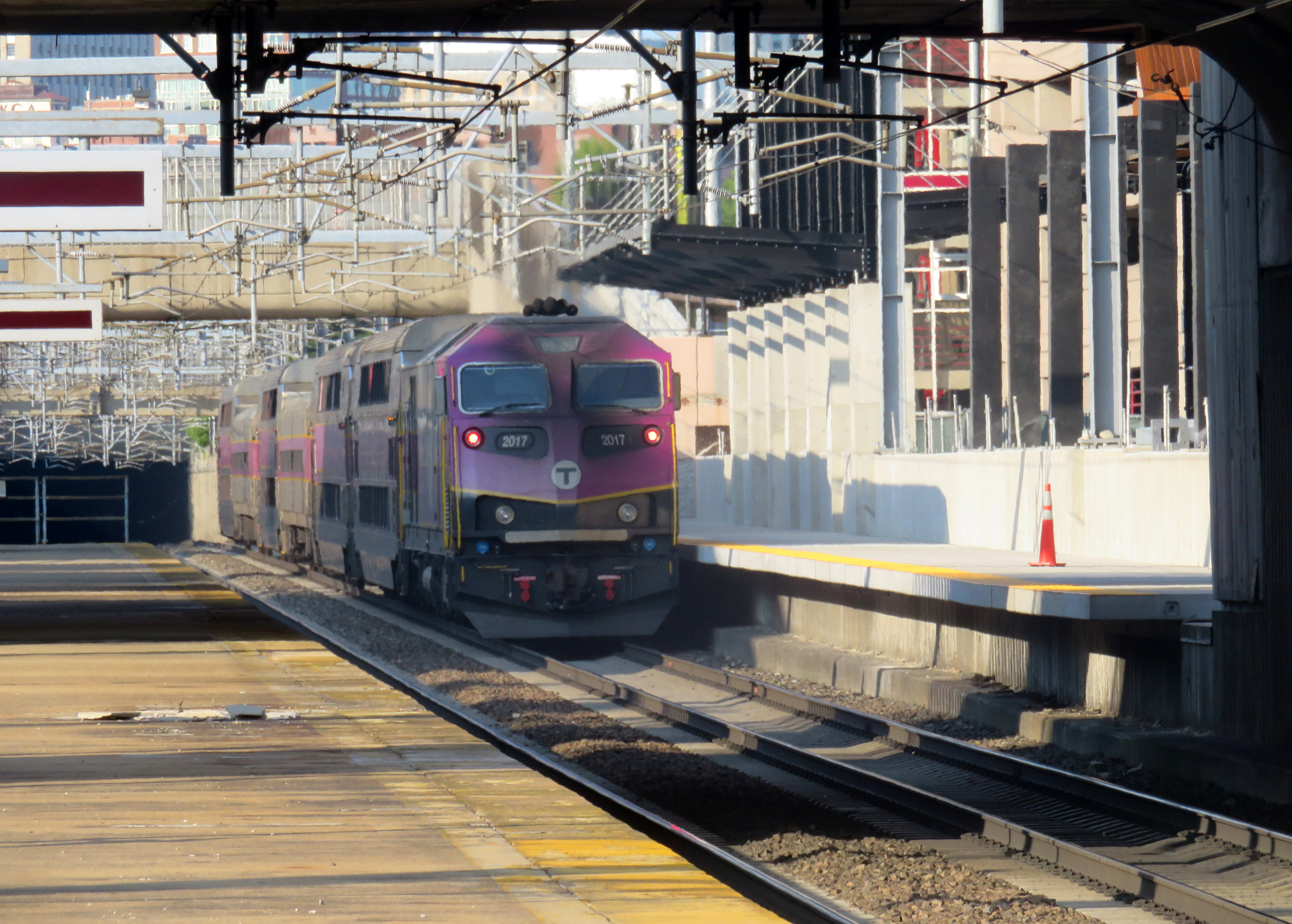
The deteriorated and closed northern half of the existing commuter rail platform (left) and the under-construction second commuter rail platform in 2019

A number of smaller projects in the Urban Ring corridor have been approved; among them was adding a second commuter rail platform to serve Track 2 at Ruggles, thus allowing all commuter rail trains to stop there. Until 2021, about 30% of inbound commuter rail trains bypassed the station, as reaching the platform required crossing over to Track 1 or Track 3. The MBTA began consideration of a second platform in 1993, just six years after Ruggles opened. A preliminary study in 2008 recommended a full-length 800-foot platform located entirely east of the busway bridge.

The MBTA began holding public meetings in 2012. By this time, plans called for the new platform to be located next to the existing platform. It was to be split in two sections connected by a short pedestrian tunnel under the busway bridge; the gap would be short enough to allow all doors on a train to still open onto the platform. In September 2014, the MBTA received a $20 million TIGER grant for the project, which is estimated to cost $30 million in total. Besides the new platform, work would include lighting and security upgrades, elevator improvements, and rehabilitation of the deteriorated northern half of the existing platform, which was blocked off from use.

By March 2016, the project was at 90% design and expected to reach 100% design by mid-2016, when it would be advertised for bidding. Construction was set to begin in late 2016 and last through 2018. In December 2016, the MBTA Fiscal and Management Control Board approved a $1.6 million expansion of the project scope to include reconstruction of the lower busway, elevator replacements, additional station entrances, an additional busway elevator, and other accessibility improvements. Bidding took place in May and June 2017; on June 26, the Board approved a $19.7 million construction contract (lower than the $22 million projected cost).

A groundbreaking ceremony for the project, which was expected to cost $38.5 million in total, was held on August 22, 2017. Construction was then planned to last from 2017 to 2019. Reconstruction of the lower busway began in April 2018. Replacement of the first two of four station elevators (the Orange Line platform elevator and the Forsyth Street elevator) began on November 12, 2019. The Orange Line elevator was completed on March 1, 2021, with the commuter rail platform elevator then closing for replacement. The new commuter rail platform opened on April 5, 2021 – in connection with new schedules that had all trains stopping at Ruggles – with the new busway elevator opening the same week. The Forsyth Street elevator reopened on May 11, 2021. The Commuter Rail elevator ultimately reopened on December 6, 2021, with the remainder of the project including the rebuilt busway elevator completed later that month.

==== Second phase ====
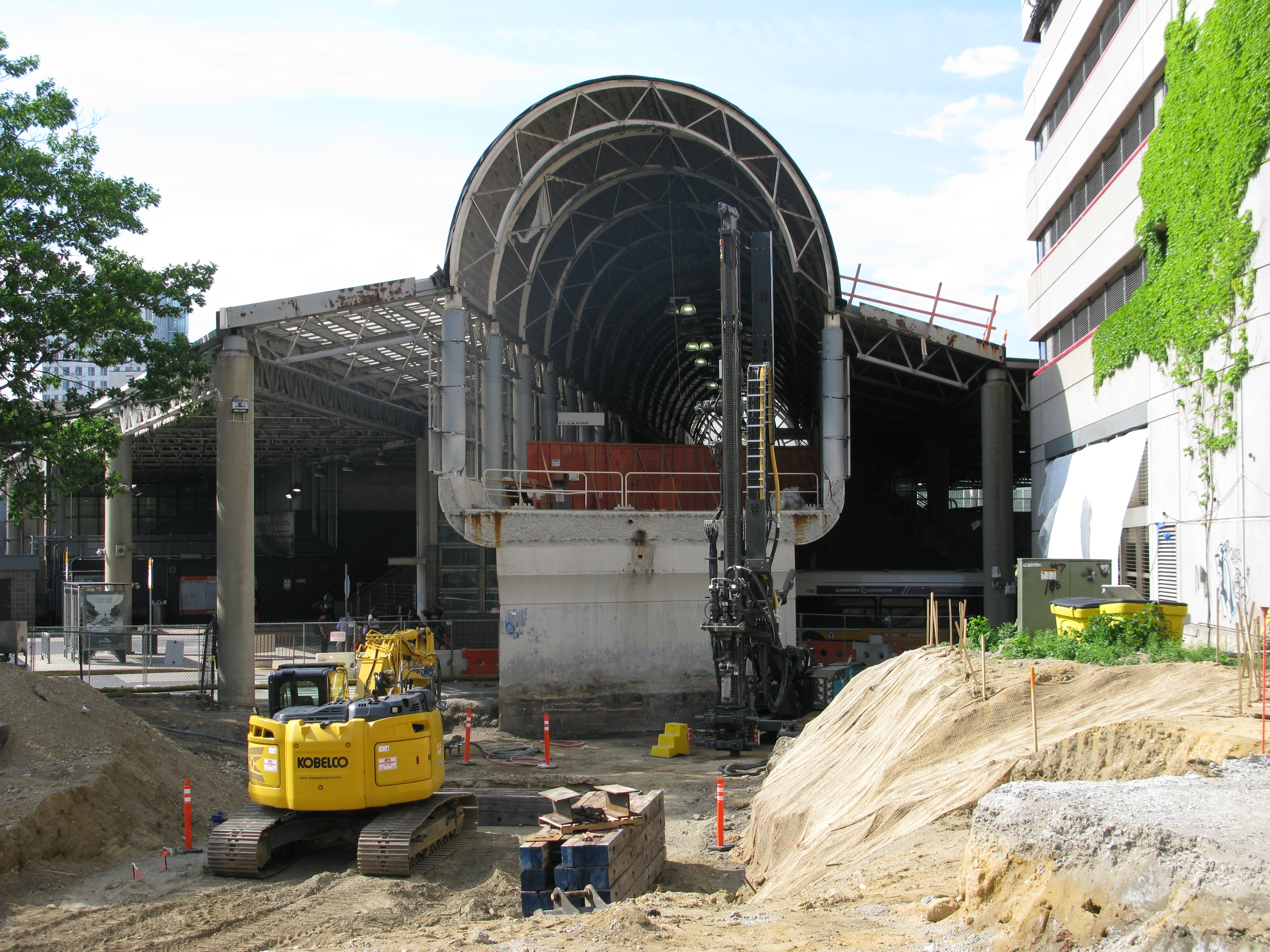
The demolished Columbus Avenue entrance in June 2026

A second phase of the project is under construction. The Columbus Avenue entrance will be made accessible, with a covered ramp to the concourse and an improved pathway to the lower busway. A new footbridge will be constructed between the lower busway and the commuter rail island platform; the northeast portion of that platform will be restored (as had been planned in the first phase). A new ramp will connect the Orange Line platform to the northeast side of the concourse, with a new set of faregates added there, and the exit-only stairs from the platform will be rebuilt. Design reached 100% in August 2022; due to inflation and other factors, projected construction costs were $25 million higher than planned. Revised designs were completed in 2023. An additional Orange Line elevator will be designed but not constructed during this phase.

Phase II was put out to bid in September 2024 with an estimated cost of $80 million. The MBTA awarded a $92 million construction contract in February 2025. Notice to proceed was given on March 20, 2025, with completion expected in 2028. The Columbus Avenue entrance closed for reconstruction on February 9, 2026. Fare gates for the commuter rail platforms, added as part of a separate project, were activated on August 3, 2026. As of August 2026, the MBTA plans to rebuild the deteriorated northern half of the commuter rail island platform through June 2027, at which that point work will shift over to the southern end of the platform and continue through December 2027.
