= Roxbury Crossing station =

Rapid transit station in Boston, Massachusetts, US

Roxbury Crossing
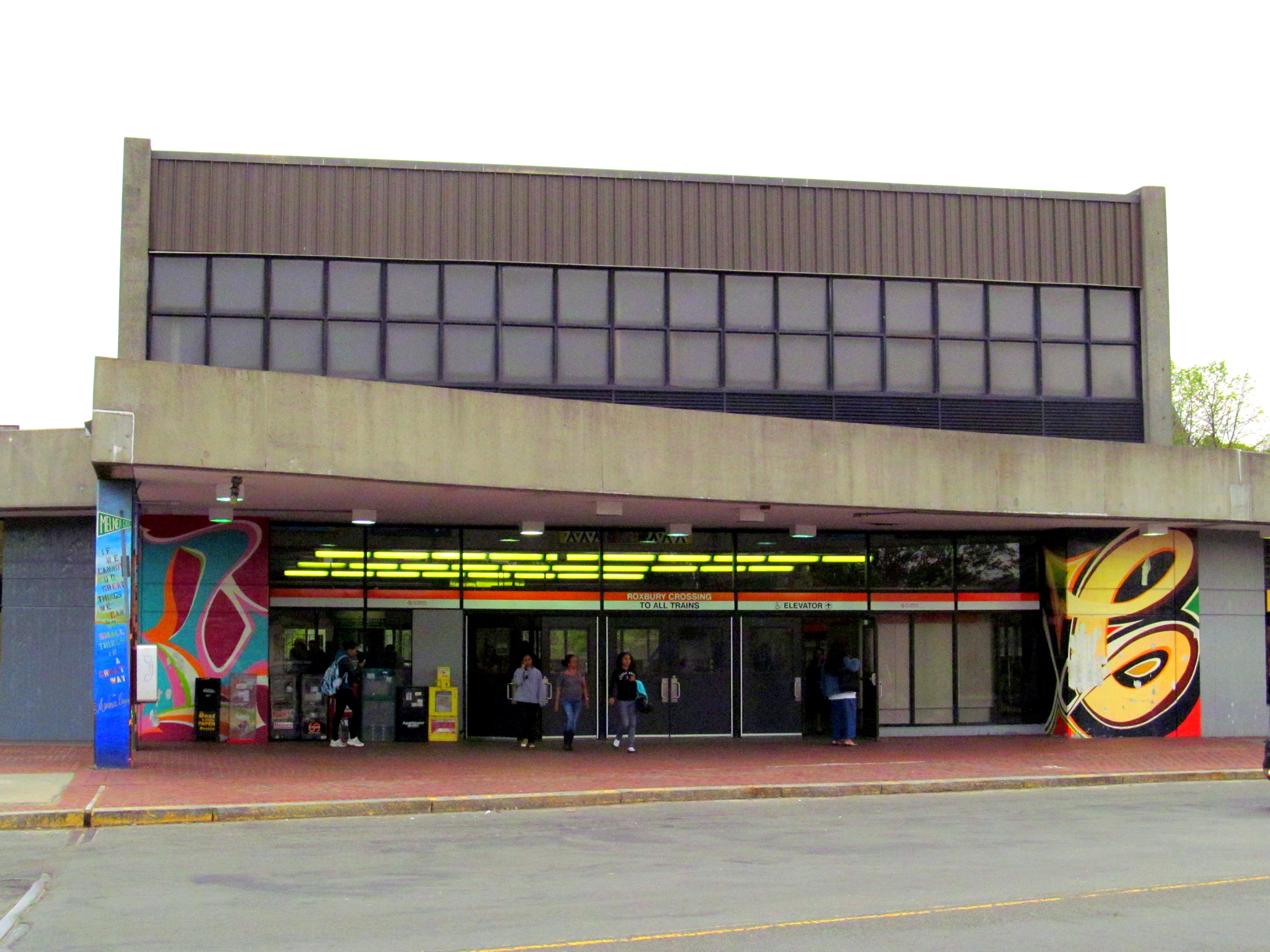
- Roxbury Crossing station entrance in May 2012

General information
- Location: 1400 Tremont Street at Columbus Avenue; Mission Hill, Boston, Massachusetts
- Coordinates: 42.3308°N 71.0960°W
- Line: Southwest Corridor
- Platforms: 1 island platform
- Tracks: 2
- Connections: MBTA bus: 15, 22, 23, 28, 44, 45, 66; Mission Hill Link

Construction
- Structure type: Below grade
- Cycle facilities: 16 spaces
- Accessible: Yes

History
- Opened: 1834 (B&P); May 4, 1987 (Orange Line)
- Closed: September 29, 1940 (NYNH&H)
- Rebuilt: June 1, 1897

Passengers
- FY2019: 4,501 daily boardings

Services
Preceding station	MBTA	Following station
Jackson Square toward Forest Hills	Orange Line	Ruggles toward Oak Grove
Location

Roxbury Crossing station is a rapid transit station in Boston, Massachusetts. It serves the MBTA Orange Line, and is located on Tremont Street in the Mission Hill neighborhood. The current station opened in 1987 as part of the renovation and relocation of the southern Orange Line. Like all stations on the Orange Line, Roxbury Crossing is accessible.

== History ==
=== Railroad station ===
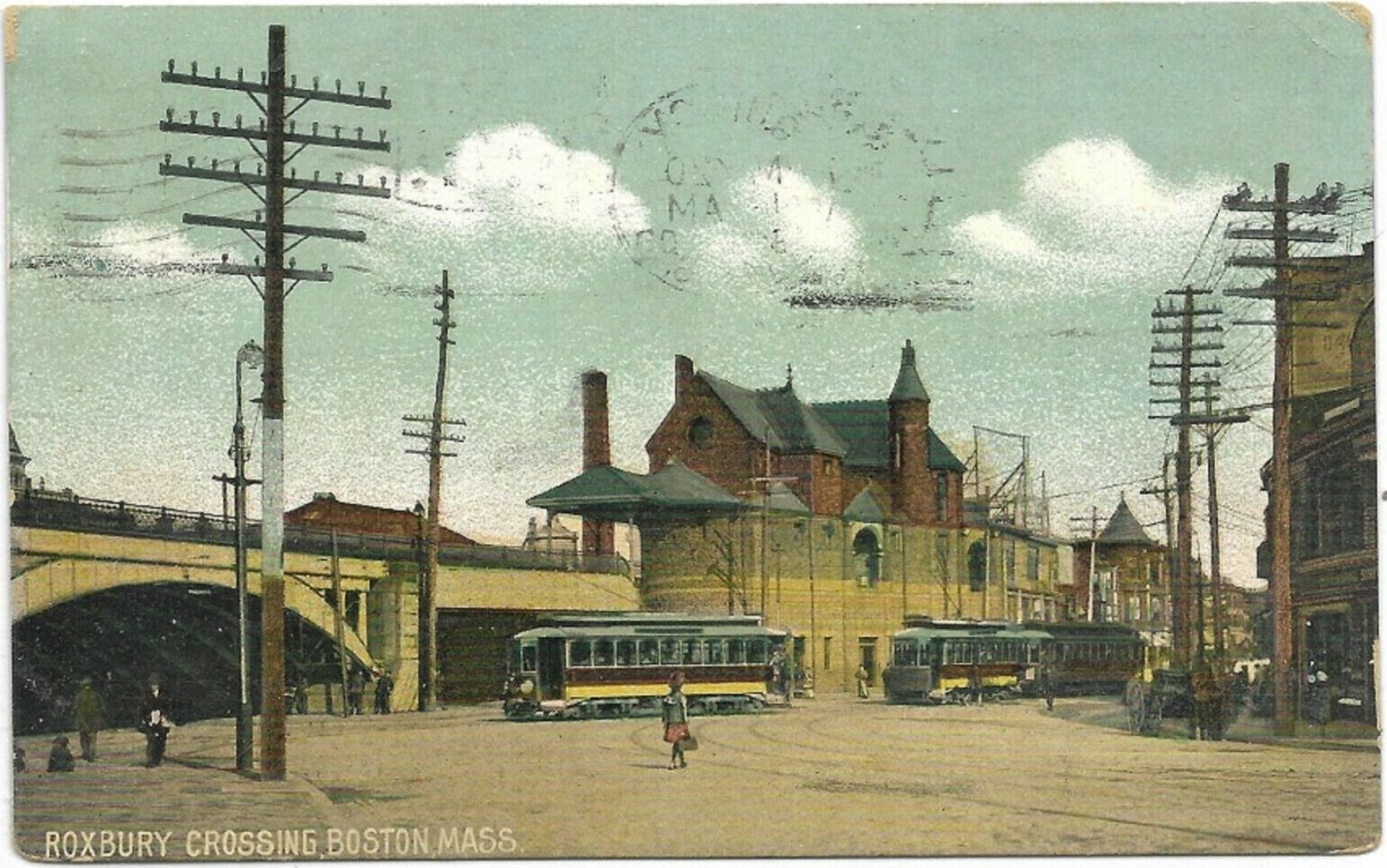
Roxbury Crossing on a 1909 postcard

Roxbury Crossing was an original stop on the Boston and Providence Railroad, opened in 1834 with the first section between Boston and Canton. In 1867, the Massachusetts legislature authorized the railroad to move the station building north to Ruggles Street, but this was not done. A new station building was completed in December 1888.

Originally, the station (along with the entire B&P main line north of Readville) was at ground level. Starting in 1891, the Old Colony Railroad (which had acquired the B&P in 1888, and was itself acquired in 1893 by the New York, New Haven and Hartford Railroad) raised the section of its main line through Roxbury and Jamaica Plain (extending from Massachusetts Avenue to the current location of Forest Hills station) onto a 4-track stone embankment to eliminate dangerous grade crossings. The project involved the building of five new stations in Roxbury and Jamaica Plain; the existing stations at Roxbury Crossing, Jamaica Plain, and Forest Hills were replaced with new elevated stations, while two additional commuter stations were built at Heath Street and Boylston Street. The new Roxbury Crossing station opened on June 1, 1897, along with the other four new stations.

On November 22, 1909, the Washington Street Elevated was extended south along Washington Street from its original southern terminus at Dudley Square, with new stations at Egleston and Forest Hills. Although the five NYNH&H stations in Roxbury and Jamaica Plain continued to operate for over three decades following the southward extension of the Washington Street Elevated, they were ultimately unable to compete with the Elevated, and Roxbury Crossing, along with the other four stations, was closed on September 29, 1940 due to a lack of passengers.

=== Orange Line ===
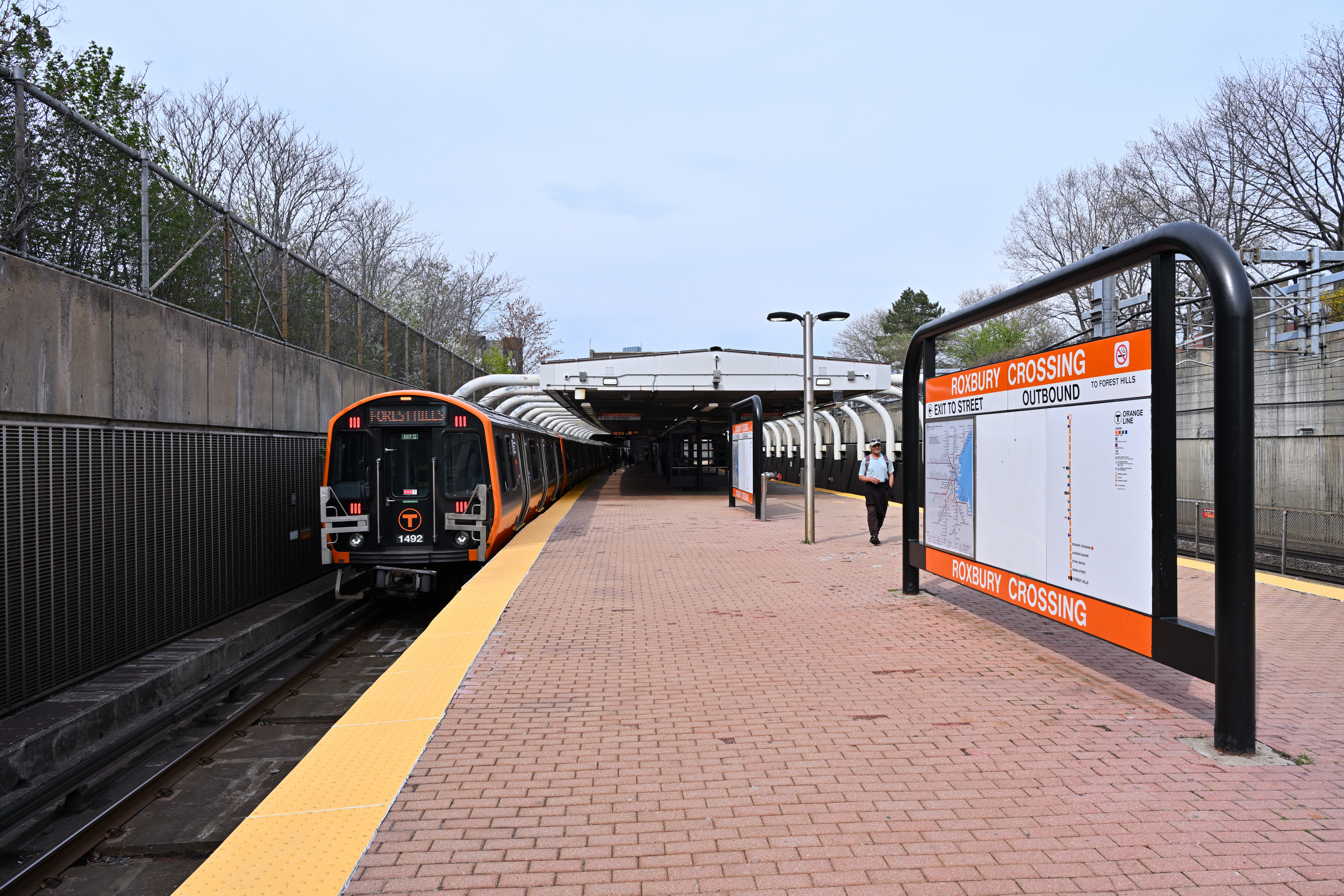
A southbound train at Roxbury Crossing station in 2025

In the 1960s, plans took hold to extend I-95 into downtown Boston along the NYNH&H's right-of-way and to replace the Washington Street Elevated (from 1967 known as the Orange Line) with a rapid transit line running in the new highway's median; these plans led to the demolition of hundreds of homes (including the virtual obliteration of the Roxbury Crossing neighbourhood) and the clearing of a long strip of land (the Southwest Corridor) extending through Roxbury and Jamaica Plain all the way up to Green Street, before the project was halted by highway revolts in 1969 and the February 11, 1970 announcement by Governor Francis W. Sargent of a moratorium on new highway construction within the Route 128 corridor, and eventually cancelled by Governor Sargent in 1972.

The cleared strip of land was eventually developed into the Southwest Corridor Park, and the Orange Line was moved to a new alignment along the Corridor in 1987 despite the cancellation of the project originally calling for its relocation. This included a new rapid transit station at Roxbury Crossing, on the site of the former NYNH&H station; the Washington Street Elevated was permanently closed on April 30, 1987, and Roxbury Crossing station, along with the eight other new stations on the southern Orange Line, opened four days later. Several bus routes which formerly ended at Dudley Square were extended to the new Ruggles station, with a connection to Roxbury Crossing station at the intersection of Tremont Street and Columbus Avenue.

The entire Orange Line, including Roxbury Crossing station, was closed from August 19 to September 18, 2022, during maintenance work. The MBTA plans to modify bus stops at the station as part of the construction of bus lanes on Columbus Avenue and Tremont Street. The bus stops for route 66 on Tremont Street will be improved, while the stops for routes 22 and 29 on Columbus Avenue will be removed (as those routes have transfers to the Orange Line at Jackson Square and Ruggles). As of March 2026, the project is delayed by the city.
