= Jackson Square station =

Rapid transit station in Boston, Massachusetts, US

Jackson Square
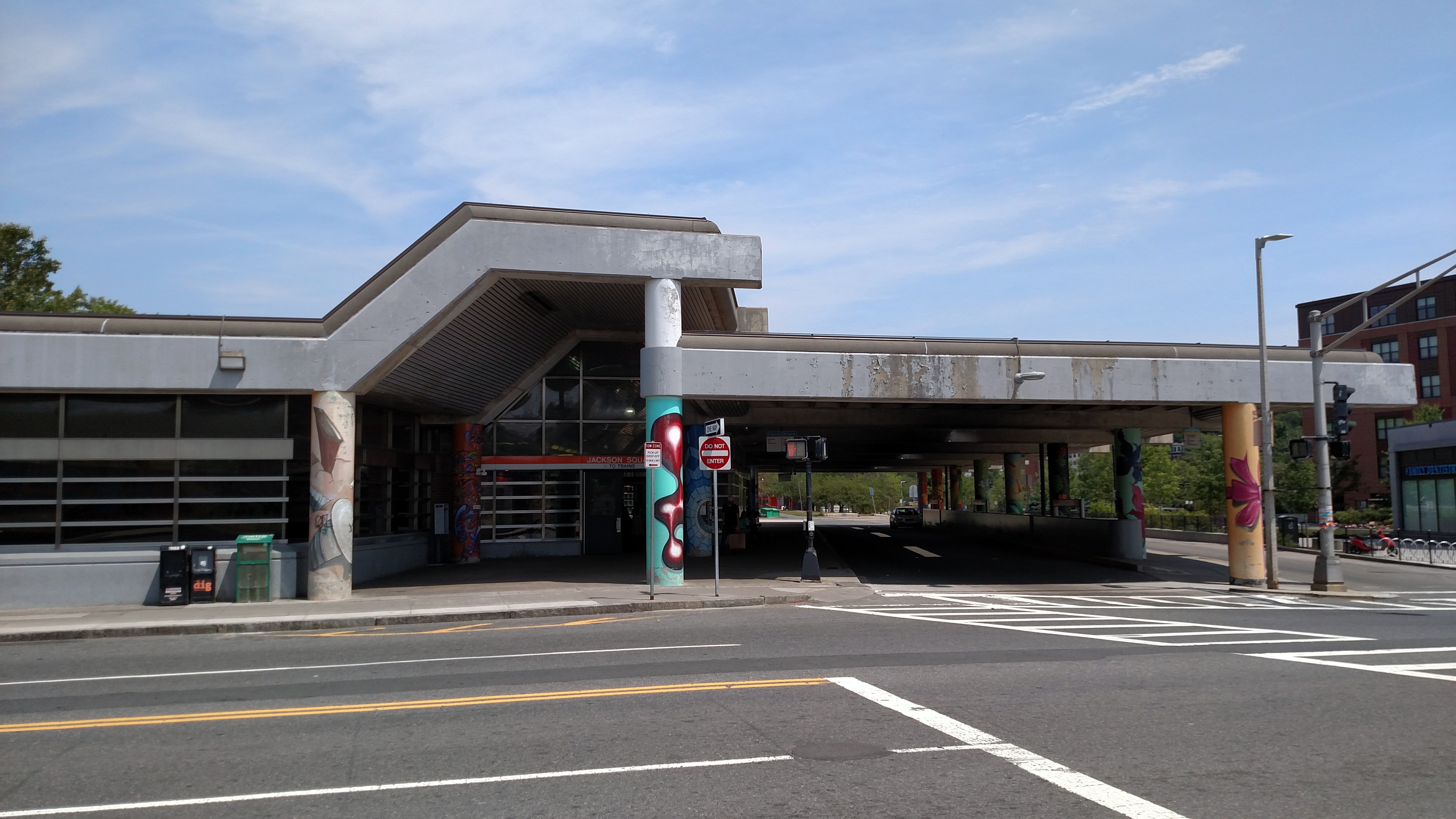
- Main entrance to Jackson Square station in 2016

General information
- Location: 1500 Columbus Avenue; Jamaica Plain, Boston, Massachusetts
- Coordinates: 42.3231°N 71.0998°W
- Line: Southwest Corridor
- Platforms: 1 island platform
- Tracks: 2
- Connections: MBTA bus: 14, 22, 29, 41, 44

Construction
- Structure type: Below grade
- Cycle facilities: 8 spaces
- Accessible: Yes

History
- Opened: May 4, 1987

Passengers
- FY2019: 5,284 daily boardings

Services
Preceding station	MBTA	Following station
Stony Brook toward Forest Hills	Orange Line	Roxbury Crossing toward Oak Grove
Location

Jackson Square station is a Massachusetts Bay Transportation Authority (MBTA) Orange Line rapid transit station located on Centre Street near Columbus Avenue in the Jamaica Plain neighborhood of Boston, Massachusetts. The station opened in 1987 as part of the Southwest Corridor project. It is served by MBTA bus routes 14, 22, 29, 41, and 44, which operate into an off-street busway located adjacent to the station.

== History ==
=== Railroad station ===
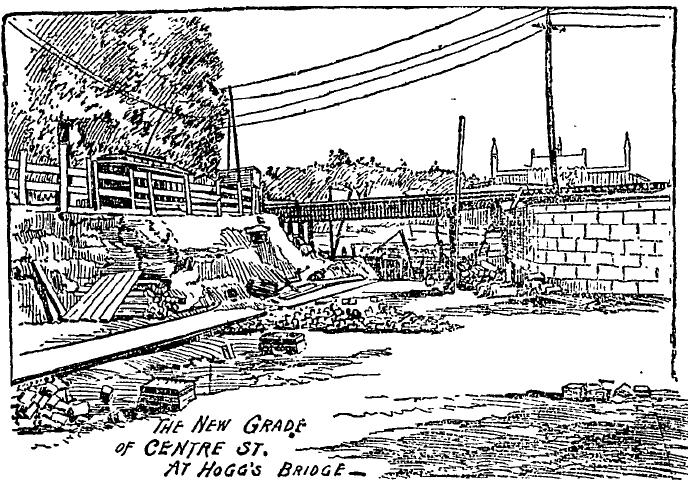
The new bridge over Centre Street in 1896

The Boston and Providence Railroad opened through Roxbury in June 1834. Local stations were gradually added; trains began serving Heath Street around the 1850s. In 1867, the Massachusetts legislature ordered the railroad to build a new station building at New Heath Street, slightly to the north. The new station was completed in 1872. It was a one-story wood building located on the west side of the tracks north of Heath Street (rather than at New Heath Street).

Starting in 1891, the Old Colony Railroad (acquired in 1893 by the New York, New Haven and Hartford Railroad) raised the section of its main line through Jamaica Plain (extending from Massachusetts Avenue to Forest Hills) onto a 4-track stone embankment to eliminate dangerous grade crossings. The project involved the replacement of the five NYNH&H stations in Roxbury and Jamaica Plain; the new elevated stations opened on June 1, 1897.

On November 22, 1909, the Washington Street Elevated was extended south from Dudley Square (now Nubian Square) to Forest Hills. Although the five NYNH&H stations in Roxbury and Jamaica Plain continued to operate, they were ultimately unable to compete with the Elevated. Heath Street station closed in the early 1930s.

=== Orange Line station ===
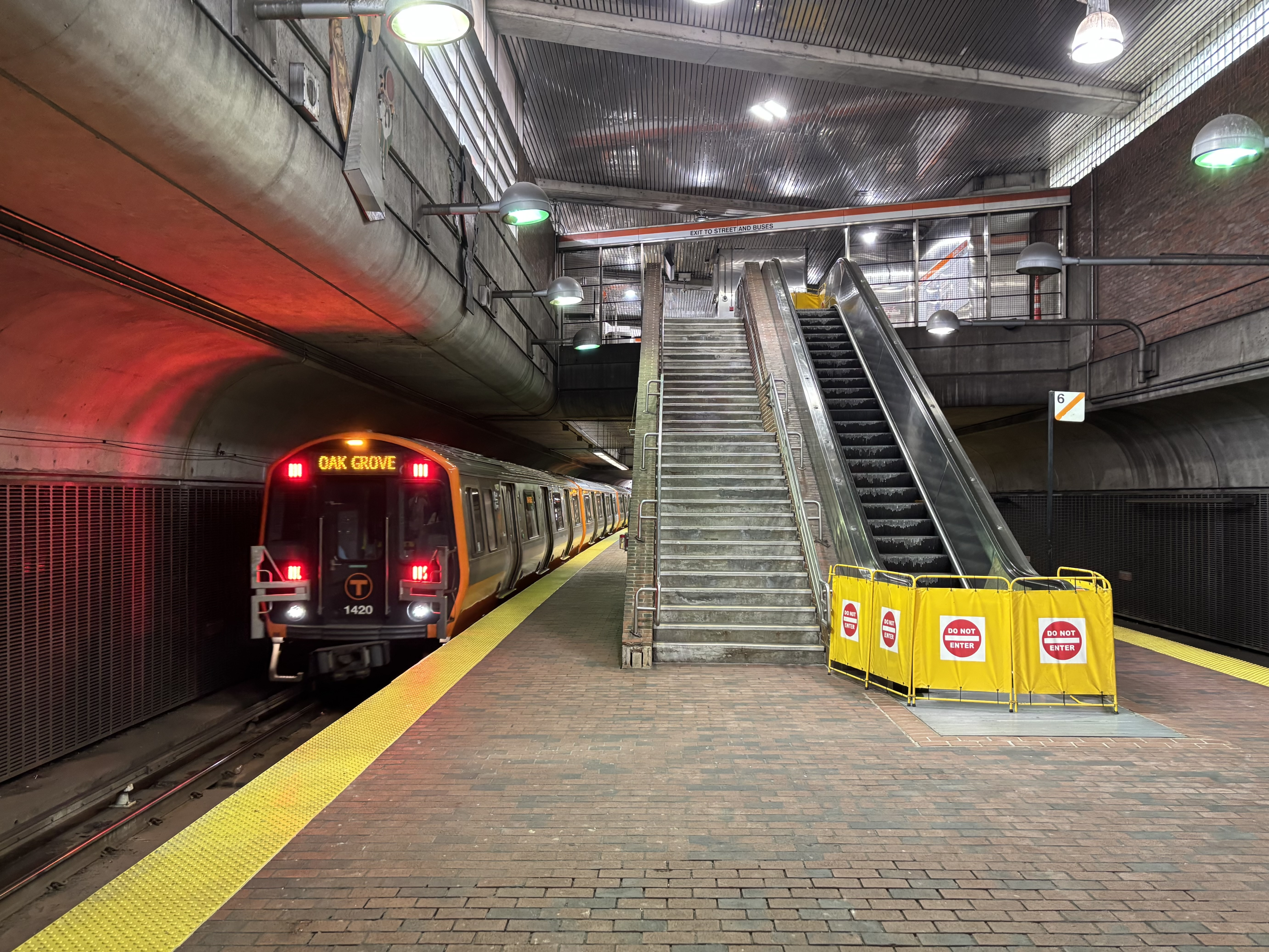
A northbound train arriving at Jackson Square station in 2025

In the 1960s, plans took hold to extend I-95 into downtown Boston along the NYNH&H's right-of-way and to replace the Washington Street Elevated (after 1967 known as the Orange Line) with a rapid transit line running in the new highway's median. Although the project was halted by highway revolts in 1969 and the February 11, 1970 announcement by Governor Francis W. Sargent of a moratorium on new highway construction within the Route 128 corridor, and eventually cancelled by Governor Sargent in 1972, the right-of-way had already been cleared. This empty strip of land (known as the Southwest Corridor) was eventually developed into the Southwest Corridor Park, and the Orange Line was moved to a new alignment along the Corridor in 1987 despite the cancellation of the project originally calling for its relocation. This included a new rapid transit station, Jackson Square, at Centre Street south of the former NYNH&H station. The Washington Street Elevated was permanently closed on April 30, 1987, and the new southern half of the Orange Line, including Jackson Square, opened on May 4.

In 2004, the MBTA added murals as well as better lighting and new sidewalks after a spree of violent crimes near the station. The improvements at the station were designed to reduce criminal activity as well as provide a more welcoming atmosphere for transit riders. Additional murals were added in December 2007. The entire Orange Line, including Jackson Square station, was closed from August 19 to September 18, 2022, during maintenance work.

=== Renovations ===
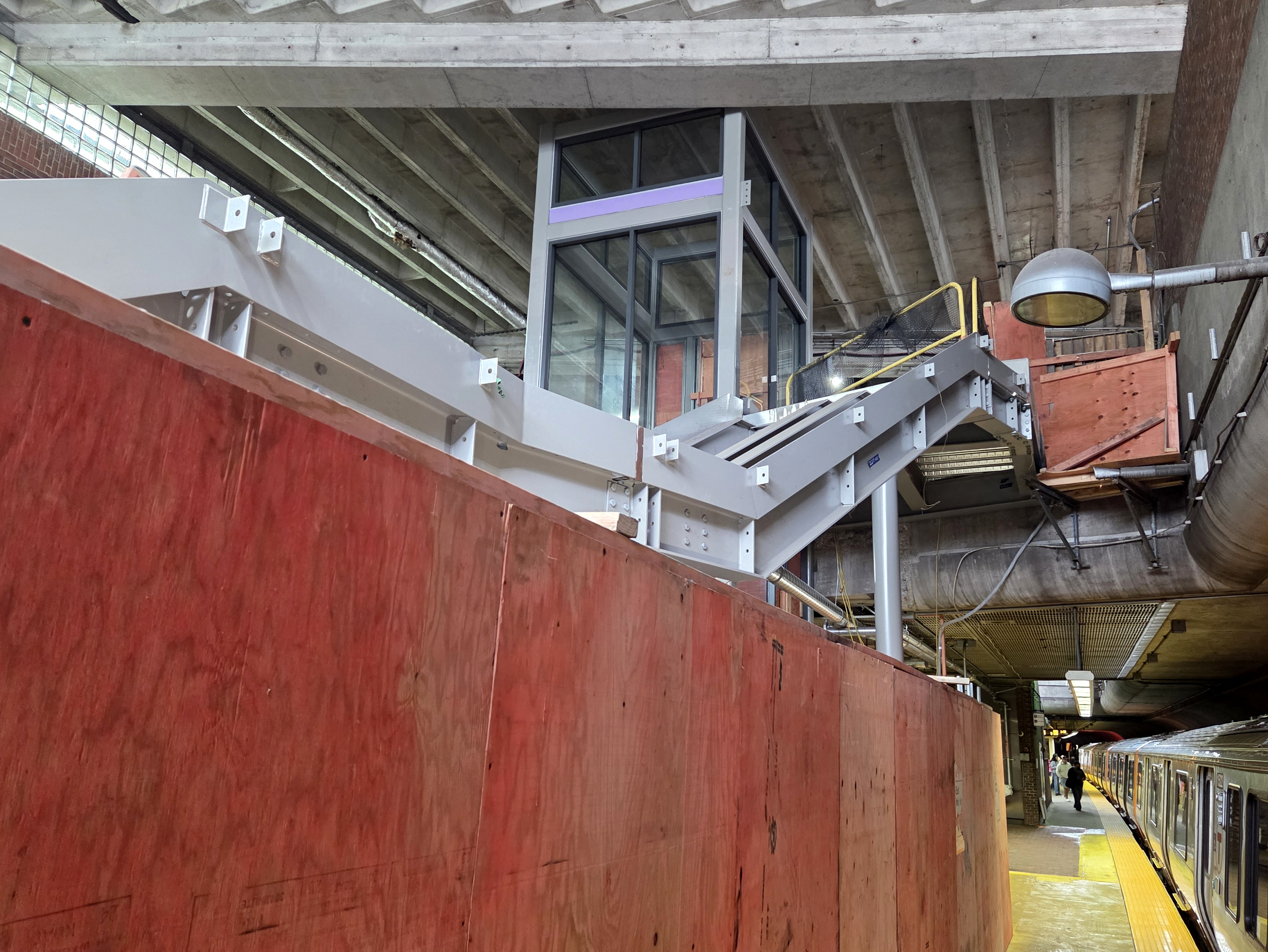
Construction work in May 2026

In the late 2010s, the MBTA began planning to add a second platform elevator, rebuild the existing elevator, and make other repairs to the station. A $4.7 million design contract for Jackson Square and Massachusetts Avenue was awarded in April 2020. Design was completed in 2023, and bidding for a $19.4 million construction contract was opened in November 2023. Construction was expected to last from March 2024 to spring 2026. However, bidding was unsuccessful. The project was re-bid in January 2025 with an estimated $25.3 million cost. Bids were higher than the estimate, in part due to increased risk associated with raising the platform to reduce the vertical gap to train cars. A $33.1 million construction contract was awarded in May 2025. Construction began in June 2025 and is expected to finish in 2027. The platform work and structural steel erection were completed by mid-2026.

The MBTA also plans to convert the currently-southbound-only busway to bidirectional bus traffic as part of construction of bus lanes on Columbus Avenue, which is planned for 2026.
