= Stony Brook station (MBTA) =

Rapid transit station in Boston, Massachusetts, US

Stony Brook
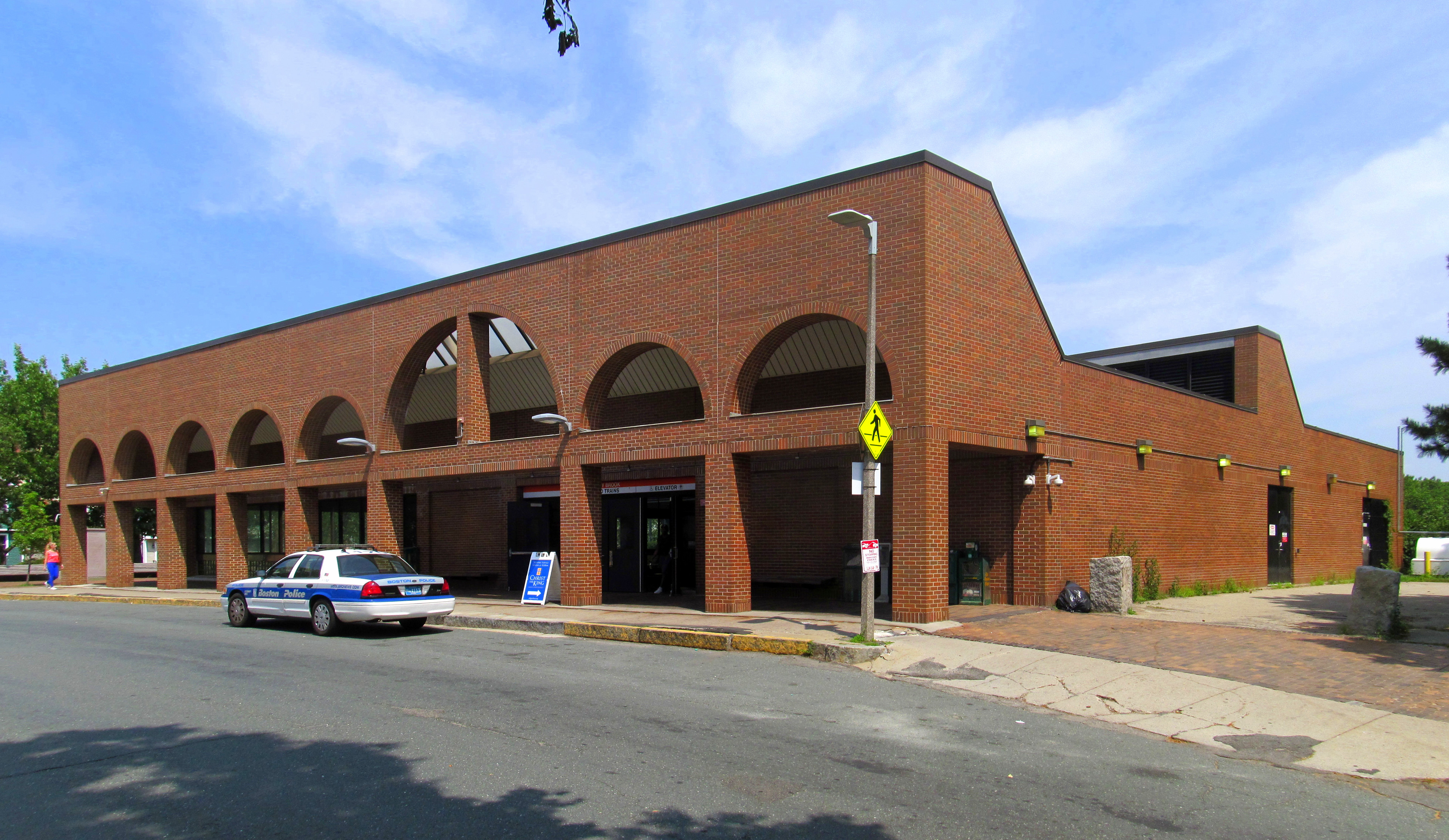
- Stony Brook station headhouse in July 2016

General information
- Location: 100 Boylston Street; Jamaica Plain, Boston, Massachusetts
- Coordinates: 42.3173°N 71.1042°W
- Line: Southwest Corridor
- Platforms: 1 island platform
- Tracks: 2

Construction
- Structure type: Below grade
- Cycle facilities: 12 spaces
- Accessible: Yes

History
- Opened: May 4, 1987

Passengers
- FY2019: 3,501 daily boardings

Services
Preceding station	MBTA	Following station
Green Street toward Forest Hills	Orange Line	Jackson Square toward Oak Grove
Location

Stony Brook station is a rapid transit station in Boston, Massachusetts. It serves the MBTA Orange Line and is located below grade at Boylston Street in the Jamaica Plain neighborhood. The station opened on May 4, 1987, as part of the Southwest Corridor project, replacing an earlier station that was open from 1897 to 1940.

== History ==
=== Railroad station ===
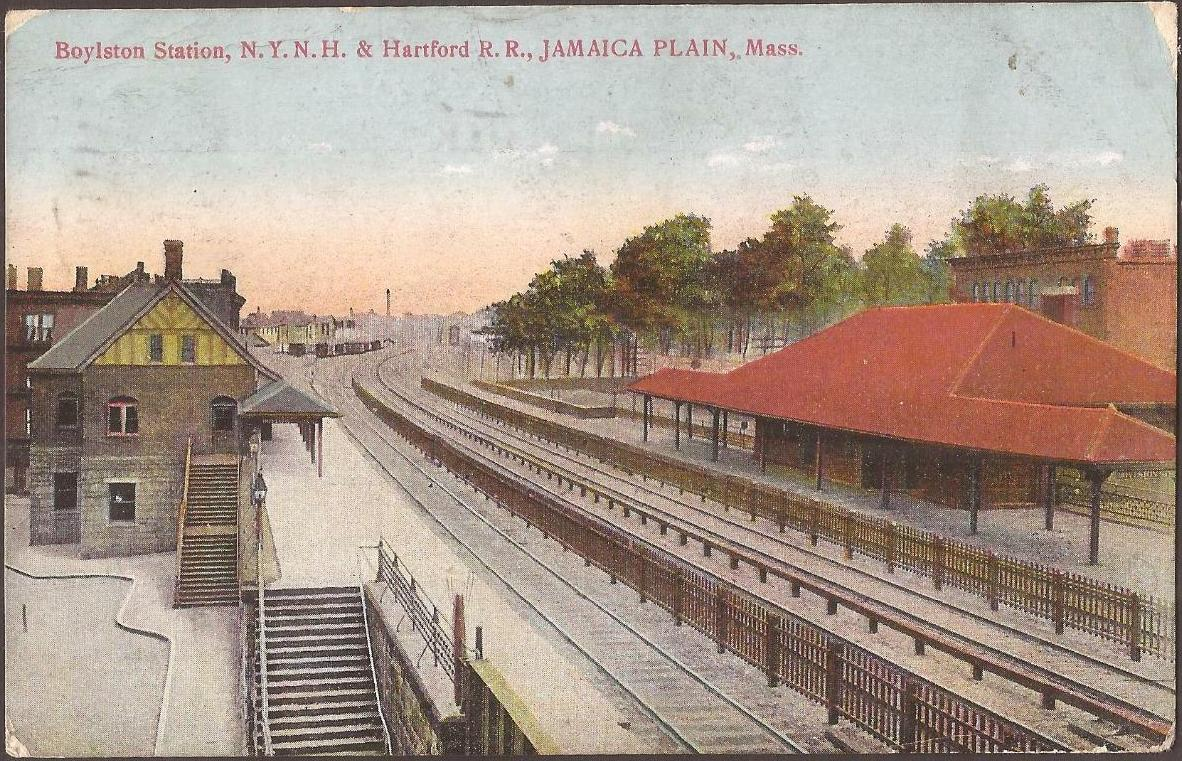
Boylston station around 1910

The Boston and Providence Railroad opened through Roxbury in June 1834. Local stations were gradually added; Boylston Street station was open by around 1849. A new station building was constructed in 1872. It was a one-story wood building located on the west side of the tracks north of Boylston Street. The final wooden bridges on the railroad's mainline were eliminated in the early 1880s when Stony Brook was rerouted to the east side of the tracks. A new station at Boylston was constructed around 1891.

Starting in 1891, the Old Colony Railroad (acquired in 1893 by the New York, New Haven and Hartford Railroad) raised the section of its main line through Jamaica Plain (extending from Massachusetts Avenue to Forest Hills) onto a 4-track stone embankment to eliminate dangerous grade crossings. The project involved the replacement of the five NYNH&H stations in Roxbury and Jamaica Plain; the new elevated stations opened on June 1, 1897.

On November 22, 1909, the Washington Street Elevated was extended south from Dudley Square (now Nubian Square) to Forest Hills. Although the five NYNH&H stations in Roxbury and Jamaica Plain continued to operate for over three decades following the southward extension of the Washington Street Elevated, they were ultimately unable to compete with the Elevated, and all, including Boylston Street, were closed on September 29, 1940 due to a lack of passengers.

=== Orange Line station ===
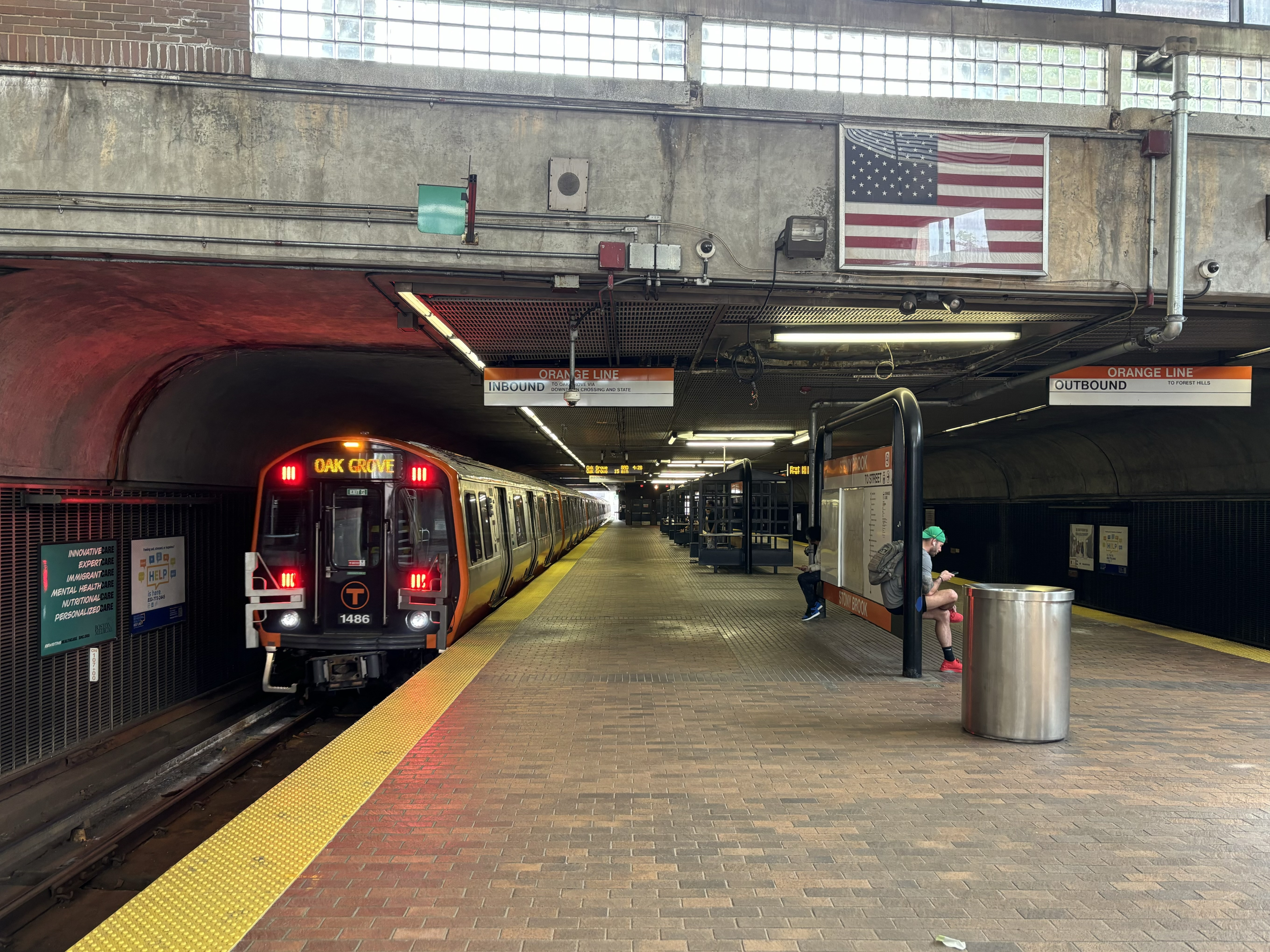
A northbound train arriving at Stony Brook station in 2024

In the 1960s, plans took hold to extend I-95 into downtown Boston along the NYNH&H's right-of-way and to replace the Washington Street Elevated (after 1967 known as the Orange Line) with a rapid transit line running in the new highway's median. Although the project was halted by highway revolts in 1969 and the February 11, 1970 announcement by Governor Francis W. Sargent of a moratorium on new highway construction within the Route 128 corridor, and eventually cancelled by Governor Sargent in 1972, the right-of-way had already been cleared. This empty strip of land (known as the Southwest Corridor) was eventually developed into the Southwest Corridor Park, and the Orange Line was moved to a new alignment along the Corridor in 1987 despite the cancellation of the project originally calling for its relocation. This included a new rapid transit station at Boylston Street, on the site of the former NYNH&H station, named Stony Brook after the former watercourse of the same name. (The name was determined in 1985 as part of a series of station name changes.)

A $2.7 million construction contract was awarded on May 5, 1983. The Washington Street Elevated was permanently closed on April 30, 1987, and the new southern half of the Orange Line, including Stony Brook, opened on May 4.

Stony Brook has not been served by MBTA bus service since route 48 was discontinued on July 1, 2012. The entire Orange Line, including Stony Brook station, was closed from August 19 to September 18, 2022, during maintenance work.
