= Southwest Corridor (Massachusetts) =

Unbuilt highway in Massachusetts, US

Southwest Expressway
- Southwest Corridor
- Proposed Southwest Corridor in red

Route information
- Status: Never built; right-of-way now used for linear park and railway including the Orange Line (MBTA)
- History: Planned in 1948–1972
- Component highways: I-95 entire length

Major junctions
- South end: I-95 / Route 128 in Canton
- North end: I-95 / I-695 in Boston

Location
- Country: United States
- State: Massachusetts

Highway system
- Massachusetts State Highway System; Interstate; US; State

The Southwest Corridor or Southwest Expressway was a project designed to bring an eight-lane highway into the City of Boston from a direction southwesterly of downtown. It was supposed to connect with Interstate 95 (I-95) at Route 128. As originally designed, it would have followed the right of way of the former Penn Central/New Haven Railroad mainline (current Amtrak Northeast Corridor) running from Readville, north through Roslindale, Forest Hills and Jamaica Plain, where it would have met the also-cancelled I-695 (Inner Belt Expressway). The 50-foot-wide (15 m) median for the uncompleted "Southwest Expressway" would have carried the southwest stretch of the MBTA Orange Line within it, replacing the Washington Street Elevated railway's 1901/1909-built elevated railbed. Another highway, the four-lane South End Bypass, was proposed to run along the railroad corridor between I-695 in Roxbury and I-90 near Back Bay.

== History ==
=== Early railroad history ===
The Boston and Providence Railroad (B&P) was chartered on June 22, 1831 to build a rail line between its two namesake cities. Construction began in late 1832, and the B&P opened from Park Square, Boston to Canton in 1834. Through Roxbury and Jamaica Plain, the railroad largely followed the valley of Stony Brook. The remaining section of the B&P main line from Canton to Providence opened the following year with the completion of the Canton Viaduct. The B&P, like many early railroads, was primarily intended for intercity travel; the only intermediate stations north of Canton were at Dedham Plain (later called Readville) and Pierpont Village (later called Roxbury).

Two additional stations in Jamaica Plain were added in 1842: Jamaica Plain at Green Street, and Tollgate (later Forest Hills) where the line crossed the Norfolk and Bristol Turnpike. Additional stations on the inner part of the line were soon added, including stops at Boylston Street in Jamaica Plain and Heath Street in Roxbury. The B&P began regularly running Dedham Specials (which used the main line to Readville and the Dedham Branch to Dedham station) in June 1842, which made commuting from these intermediate stations possible. A second track from Boston to Roxbury was added in 1839 and extended to Readville in 1845.

Commuter traffic on the B&P – which had numbered just 320 daily passengers from the eight stations north of Readville in 1849 – rapidly expanded thereafter. The railroad cut sharply into the profits of the private turnpike; it became a free public road (Washington Street) south of Dedham in 1843, and north of Dedham in 1857. A third track from Boston to Readville was added in 1873-74. Around 1885, Forest Hills became the outer terminus for some short-turn commuter service. In 1888, the Old Colony Railroad bought the B&P.

=== Raising the railroad ===
Between the Boston terminal in Park Square and Forest Hills, the B&P mainline was at grade except for Hogg's Bridge, which carried Centre Street over the railroad. As traffic increased both on local streets (including horsecars and streetcars) and on the railroad, the numerous grade crossings became increasingly dangerous. (The danger was present even in the earliest years of the railroad; in 1846, a man was killed by a train at the crossing at Tollgate station.)

On June 21, 1890, the Massachusetts General Court passed An Act to Promote the Abolition of Grade Crossings, which allowed town officials or a railroad company to petition the state superior court to create an independent commission to determine whether a grade crossing could and should be eliminated. The costs of such eliminations were to be paid 65% by the railroad, not more than 10% by the town, and the remainder by the state. The small local cost provided towns incentive to petition for crossing eliminations to prevent public thoroughfares from being blocked by trains and to avoid deadly collisions. In July 1890, local politicians began planning for a grade crossing elimination project on the busy B&P mainline through Roxbury and Jamaica Plain. The B&P began property acquisition for the project in 1891. The General Court legislated the grade crossing elimination from Massachusetts Avenue to Blakemore Street on June 16, 1892. The cost allocation was changed from the 1890 bill: 55% by the railroad, 31.5% by the state, and 13.5% by the city.

=== Highway proposal ===
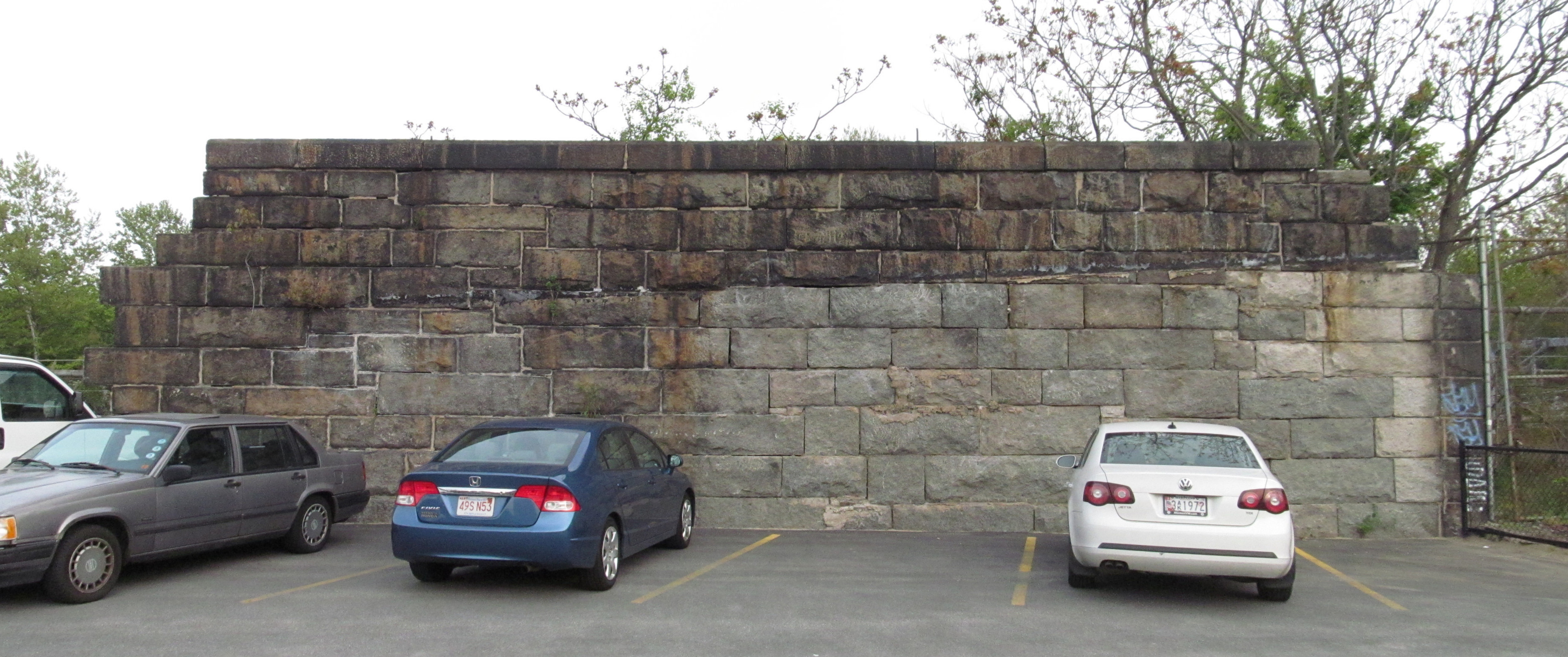
One remaining section of the former railroad embankment near Roxbury Crossing

The highway project started in 1948 with Massachusetts Public Works director William F. Callahan's Master Highway Plan for Metropolitan Boston, went through several adjustments and then was terminated in 1972 by Governor Francis Sargent, following popular pressure. Governor Sargent declared a moratorium on all expressway construction within Route 128 in 1970 following the recommendation of the Boston Transportation Planning Review, a task force of private experts headed by Alan Altshuler that he appointed to study controversial highway plans. Having been witness to recent housing clearances for the Interstate 93 expressway and Massachusetts Turnpike, as well as similar projects in New York City and other cities, the population of the affected area was largely unwilling to repeat similar costs for another expressway. The Interstate Highway Option, which allowed the state to transfer the $600 million earmarked for highway construction to fund the mass transit project, was not approved by Congress until 1973. Fred Salvucci described Sargent's decision to cancel the expressway before the Interstate Highway Option transfer as "It was like he jumped off the top of the Prudential Center and hoped that Alan Altshuler would have a net woven to catch him by the time he got to the bottom." A community-led land use study for the cleared land took place in 1971–72.

The Route 128/I-93/I-95 interchange was nearly completed, leaving unused ramps north of the interchange and two unused bridges which were later removed. In 1973, the state planned to build a 300-space parking garage – to be served by express buses to Boston, Providence, and Logan Airport – on the stub end of I-95 just inside Route 128. However, the project was unpopular with residents in Milton.

Two sections of the railroad embankment remain – one along Mindoro Street just north of Roxbury Crossing, and the other behind the former Highland Brewery at New Heath Street. Numerous granite blocks were recycled in the Southwest Corridor Park and as walls in the Emerald Necklace park system.

In 1989, the Southwest Corridor project was awarded a Federal Design Achievement Award by the National Endowment for the Arts, which stated that "in its social vision, as well as its design and engineering requirements, the Southwest Corridor Project is a model for contemporary urban design.

== Current status ==
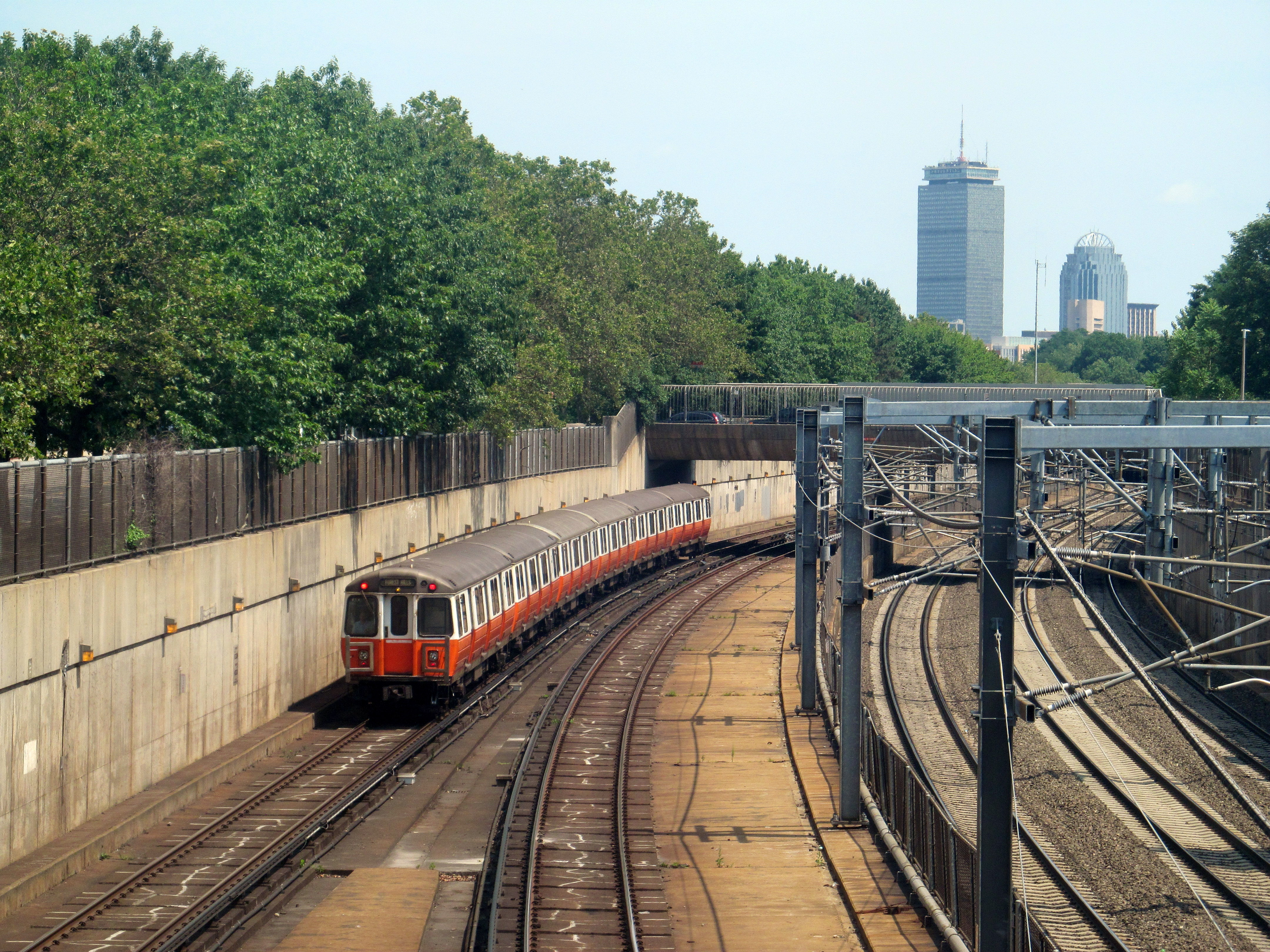
Orange Line train in the Southwest Corridor, replacing the Washington Street Elevated

Much like what had been planned for the median of the unbuilt Southwest Expressway/I-95 right-of-way, part of the corridor was later recycled into the new route for two tracks for the MBTA's Orange Line and three tracks for Amtrak's Northeast Corridor and the MBTA's Needham and Readville commuter lines with much of the surface area being developed as a 52-acre (210,000 m^{2}) linear park. The Amtrak trains used diesel until 1999 when Amtrak completed overhead catenary electrification of the line between New Haven and Boston.

Several houses were torn down on the corner of Cummins Highway and Rowe Street in Roslindale to make room for an interchange. That land is now used as the Southwest Boston Community Gardens.

=== Southwest Corridor Park ===
The Southwest Corridor Park, maintained by the state DCR, has become a vibrant space for pedestrians, bicyclists, dog-walkers, amateur sports leagues, and community gardeners. The Southwest Corridor Park Conservancy helps maintain gardens, runs summer youth projects in the park, and keeps a website with maps and photos.

== See also ==
- Highway revolts
- Interstate 695 – A once proposed closely related project to build an inner ring expressway around downtown Boston and cutting through southern Cambridge.
