= Forest Hills station (MBTA) =

Transit station in Boston, Massachusetts, US

Forest Hills
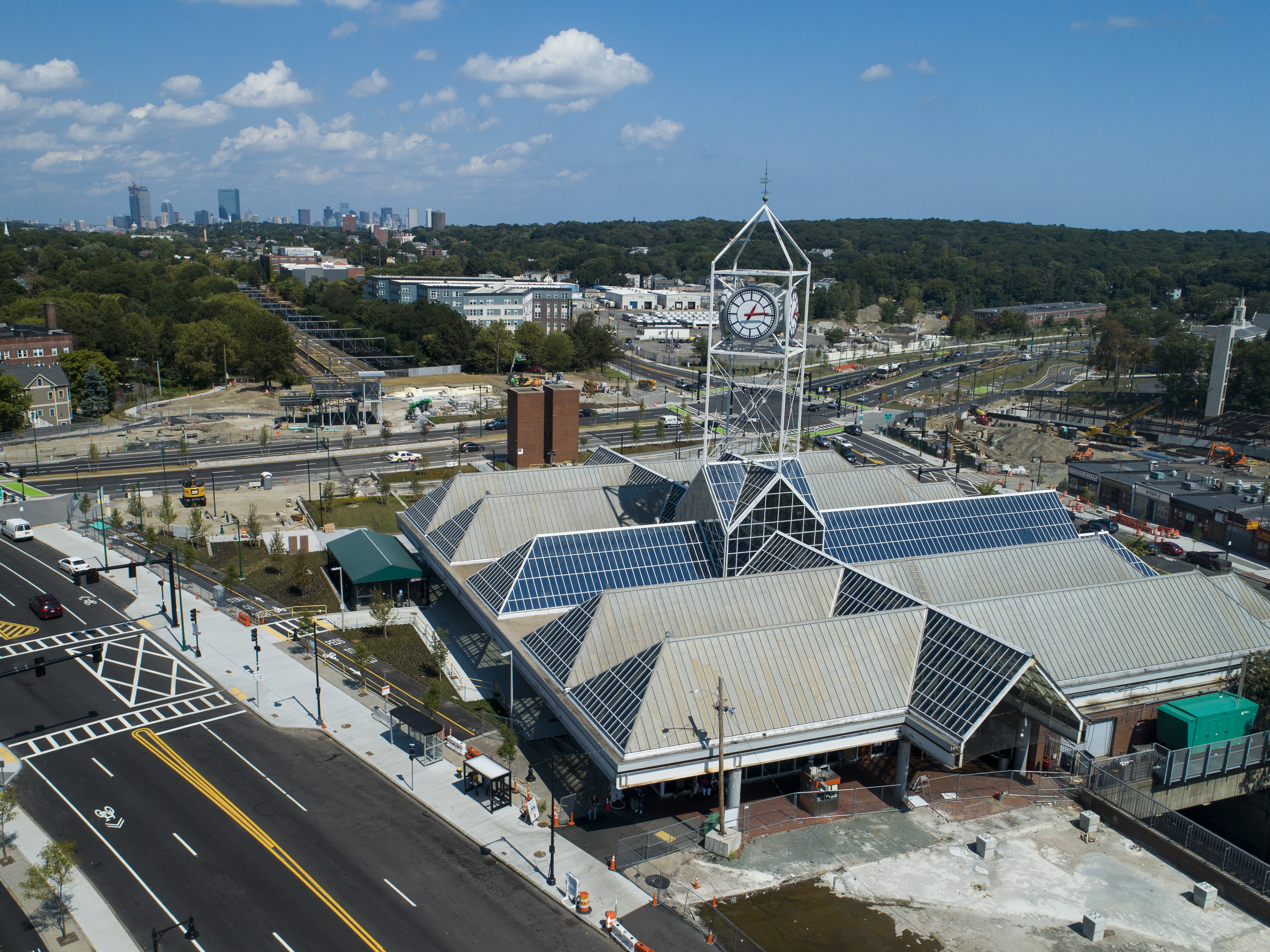
- Aerial view of Forest Hills station in 2018

General information
- Location: Washington Street at Hyde Park Avenue; Jamaica Plain, Boston, Massachusetts
- Coordinates: 42°18′02″N 71°06′50″W
- Lines: Attleboro Line (Northeast Corridor, Southwest Corridor)
- Platforms: 2 island platforms (1 for each service)
- Tracks: 2 (Orange Line); 4 (commuter rail)
- Connections: MBTA bus: 16, 21, 30, 31, 32, 34, 34E, 35, 36, 37, 38, 39, 40, 42, 50, 51

Construction
- Parking: 206 spaces ($6.00 fee)
- Cycle facilities: 32 spaces ("Pedal and Park" bicycle cage)
- Accessible: Yes

Other information
- Fare zone: 1A (Commuter Rail)

History
- Opened: 1842 (commuter rail station); November 22, 1909 (elevated rapid transit station)
- Closed: April 30, 1987 (elevated Orange Line station)
- Rebuilt: May 4, 1987 (modern combined station)
- Former names: Tollgate

Passengers
- FY2019: 12,538 daily boardings (Orange Line)
- 2024: 521 daily boardings (commuter rail)

Services
| Preceding station | MBTA | Following station |
|---|---|---|
| Terminus | Orange Line | Green Street toward Oak Grove |
| Roslindale Village toward Needham Heights | Needham Line | Ruggles toward South Station |
| Hyde Park toward Wickford Junction or Stoughton | Providence/Stoughton Line limited service | Ruggles toward South Station |
| Hyde Park toward Forge Park/495 or Foxboro | Franklin/Foxboro Line limited service | Ruggles toward South Station |
Track layout
Location

Forest Hills station is an intermodal transfer station in Boston, Massachusetts. It serves the MBTA rapid transit Orange Line and three MBTA Commuter Rail lines (Needham, Providence/Stoughton, and Franklin/Foxboro) and is a major terminus for MBTA bus routes. It is located in Forest Hills, in the southern part of the Jamaica Plain neighborhood. Most Providence/Stoughton Line and Franklin/Foxboro Line trains, and all Amtrak Northeast Corridor trains, pass through the station without stopping. Forest Hills station is fully accessible on all modes.

== Station layout ==
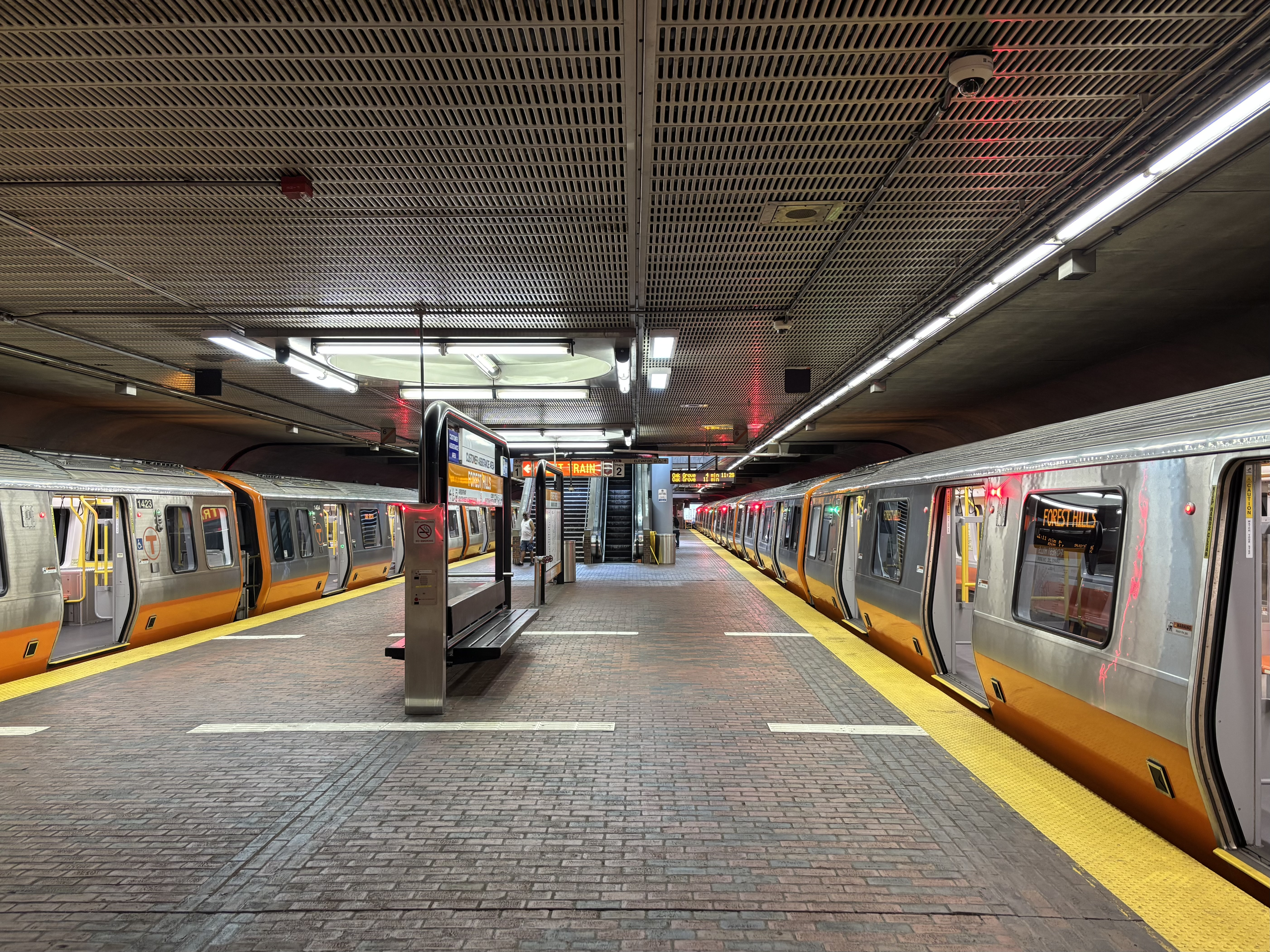
Orange Line trains at Forest Hills station in 2025

Forest Hills station is located at the southern end of the Jamaica Plain neighborhood, where Washington Street, South Street, and Hyde Park Avenue intersect the Arborway parkway. To the west of the station is Arnold Arboretum; to the east is the small Forest Hills neighborhood plus Forest Hills Cemetery and Franklin Park.

Six tracks run through the Southwest Corridor cut at Forest Hills. On the west side are the two tracks of the Orange Line with an island platform between them. Orange Line trains use both tracks; a crossover north of the platforms allows trains to switch tracks for regular right-hand drive operation on the rest of the line. To the east are one track of the Needham Branch (track 5) and the three tracks of the Northeast Corridor (tracks 3, 1, and 2). An island platform for MBTA Commuter Rail tracks is located between tracks 5 and 3. Forest Hills is the junction between the Needham Branch and the Northeast Corridor: track 5 merges into track 3 north of the station, while a second Needham Branch track splits from track 3 just to the south.

The station building is at ground level above the tracks. Several small retailers are located in the station along with an MBTA Police substation.

Forest Hills serves as a major bus transfer station; 16 MBTA bus routes terminate at the station. Routes 16, 21, 31, 32, and 42 run on Hyde Park Avenue, Washington Street (north of the station), and the Arborway, and use the lower busway located off Hyde Park Avenue east of the station. Routes 30, 34, 34E, 35, 36, 37, 38, 39, 40, 50, and 51 run on South Street and Washington Street; they use the upper busway west of the station.

== History ==
=== Tollgate station ===
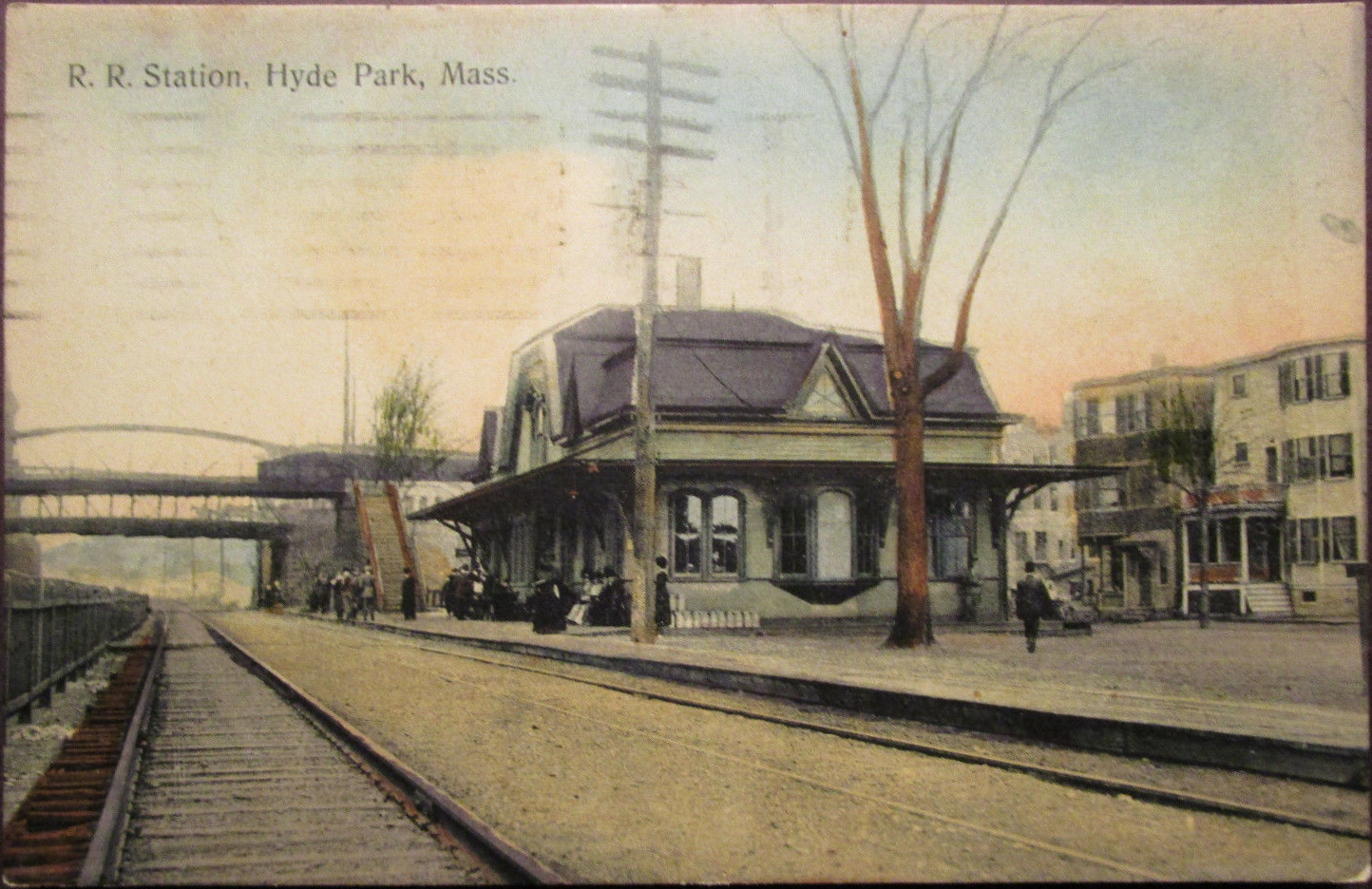
The 1873-built Forest Hills station was similar to this 1872-built structure at Hyde Park.

The Boston and Providence Railroad (B&P) was chartered on June 22, 1831, to build a rail line between its two namesake cities. Construction began in late 1832, and the B&P opened from Park Square, Boston to Canton in 1834. The remaining section of the B&P main line from Canton to Providence opened the following year with the completion of the Canton Viaduct. The B&P, like many early railroads, was primarily intended for intercity travel; the only intermediate stations north of Canton were at Dedham Plain (later called Readville) and Pierpont Village (later called Roxbury Crossing). (However, there was also an early flag stop at Tollgate where the line crossed the Norfolk and Bristol Turnpike adjacent to one of its toll gates.)

Two additional stations in Jamaica Plain were added in 1842: Jamaica Plain at Green Street, and Tollgate at the former flag stop. The B&P began regularly running Dedham Specials (which used the main line to Readville and the Dedham Branch to Dedham station) in June 1842, which made commuting from Tollgate and the other intermediate stations possible. A second track from Roxbury Crossing to Readville was added in 1845. A small station building at Tollgate was added that year, and several businesses soon sprung up around the station.

On July 14, 1849, the B&P opened a second branch to Dedham – this one from Tollgate via West Roxbury. Commuter traffic on the B&P – which had numbered just 320 daily passengers from the eight stations north of Readville in 1849 – was rapidly expanding. The railroad cut sharply into the profits of the private turnpike; it became a free public road south of Dedham in 1843, and north of Dedham in 1857. The Forest Hills Cemetery was founded nearby in 1848; by the late 1850s, the station was renamed Forest Hills. A new station building was constructed in 1873. It was similar to the structure built at Hyde Park the previous year.

=== Horsecars and streetcars ===
The railroad would soon face its own competition in the form of horsecar lines. The West Roxbury Railroad opened from South Street at McBride Street in Jamaica Plain (1,900 feet (580 m) north of Forest Hills station) to Roxbury Crossing in 1857. It was immediately acquired by the Metropolitan Railroad and connected to its existing trackage, providing service from Jamaica Plain to downtown Boston. After the former Turnpike (soon renamed Washington Street) became a free public road in 1857, a horsecar line was constructed on it between Tollgate and existing tracks at Dudley Square.

Most horsecar service in Boston was consolidated under the West End Street Railway in 1887. Electric streetcar service in Boston began with the Beacon Street line in 1888; the Washington Street line was electrified on September 2, 1890. The West End built its first Forest Hills Yard (renamed Arborway Yard in 1924) in 1895. The West End was acquired by the Boston Elevated Railway (BERy) in 1897. The line on South Street was extended to Forest Hills Yard in 1902; through service to the Tremont Street subway on the Arborway Line began in 1915. The Washington Street and South Street lines converged at Forest Hills Square, just east of the station; a covered platform was built there to aid transfers.

=== Raising the railroad ===
Between 1891 and 1897, the New Haven Railroad raised its main line from just south of Back Bay to Forest Hills onto a 4-track stone embankment to eliminate dangerous grade crossings. The Forest Hills viaduct was designed by Frederick Law Olmsted as an important element of the Emerald Necklace. Five new local stations in Dorchester and Jamaica, including Forest Hills, opened on June 1, 1897. The station building at Forest Hills was similar to the still-extant station at Norwood Central, built two years later.

=== Elevated station ===
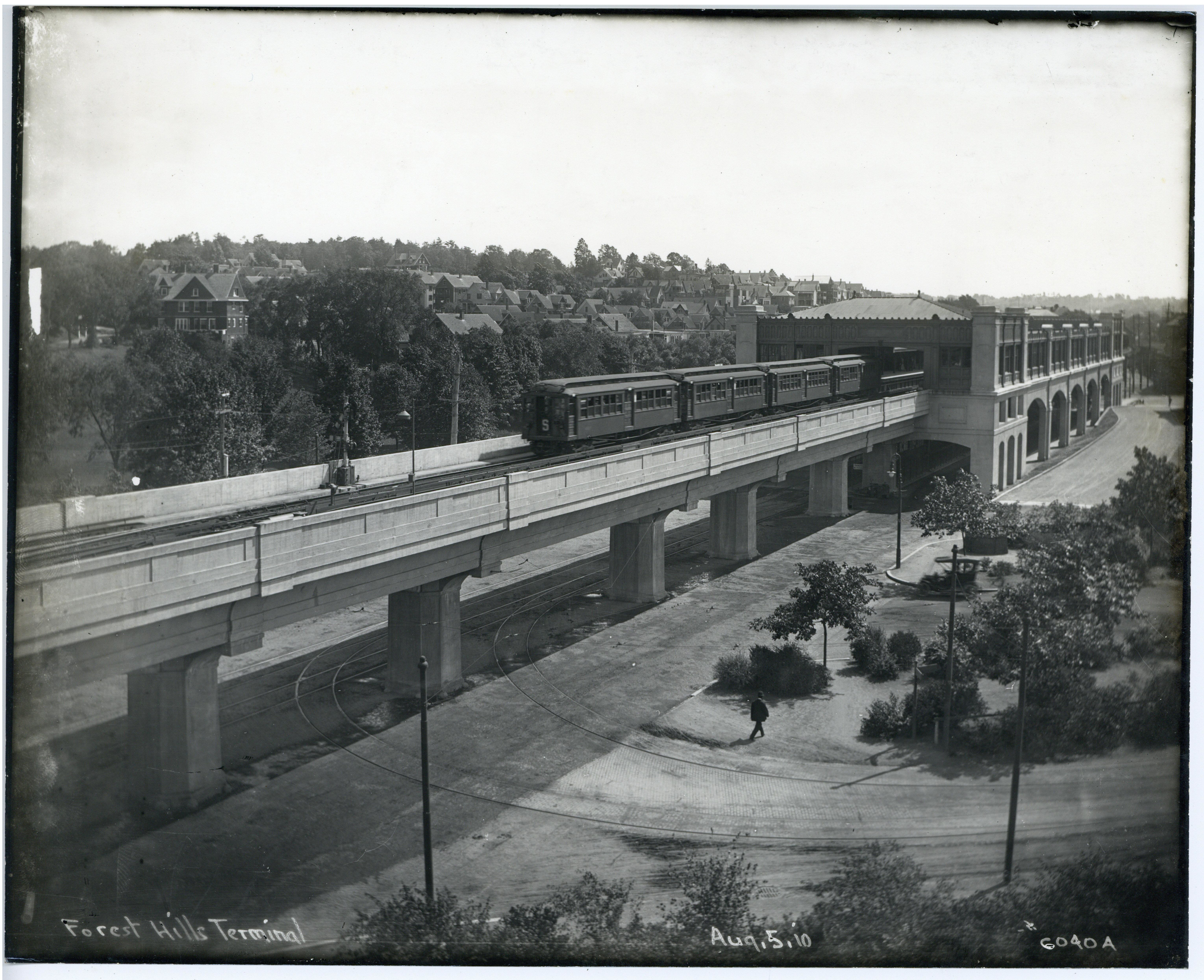
A northbound Boston Elevated Railway Main Line train with a smoking (S) car on front leaves Forest Hills station in 1910

On November 22, 1909, the Washington Street Elevated was extended from Dudley Square to Forest Hills, with a grand elevated station and a maintenance facility located between Hyde Park Avenue and the mainline tracks. As with most Boston Elevated Railway stations, Forest Hills was designed for efficient streetcar-to-elevated transfers; Forest Hills and nearby Arborway became major streetcar hubs. Designed by Edmund M. Wheelwright, the station was called "the chef-d'œuvre of rapid transit development in Boston".

The New Haven Railroad briefly operated high-frequency local service from Forest Hills to South Station, but it failed to compete with the El and was cut back. The five local stops were abandoned on September 29, 1940. The Forest Hills stop alone was revived on June 4, 1973, for Needham Line service, although by 1976 it was used by less than 50 riders a day, versus 15,000 at the Elevated station. The MTA began charging for parking at its stations, including Forest Hills, on November 2, 1953.

=== Southwest Corridor ===
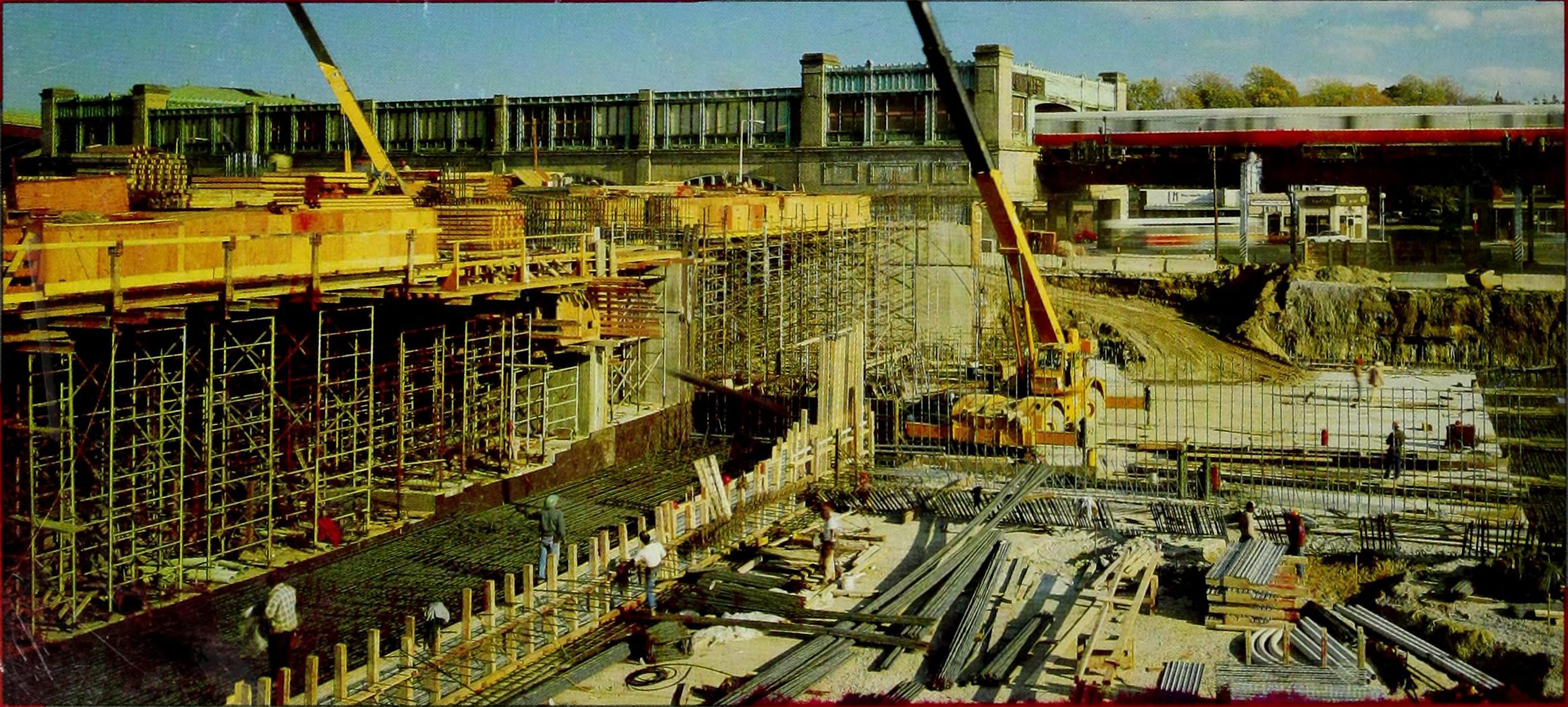
Construction of the new station in 1985, with the old station behind

From 1979 to 1987, Forest Hills was completely rebuilt as an intermodal transfer station as part of the Southwest Corridor project. The project involved removing the century-old viaduct and moving the tracks into a trench with three mainline tracks plus two Orange Line tracks to replace the aging Washington Street Elevated. The new rapid transit stations mirror the locations of the former mainline stations between Forest Hills and Back Bay. Needham Line service was suspended on October 13, 1979; Providence/Stoughton Line and Franklin Line service (which do not stop) were rerouted over the Fairmount Line on November 3, 1979. The Forest Hills viaduct was destroyed with a controlled explosion on November 12, 1983; work on the new station began on June 1, 1984.

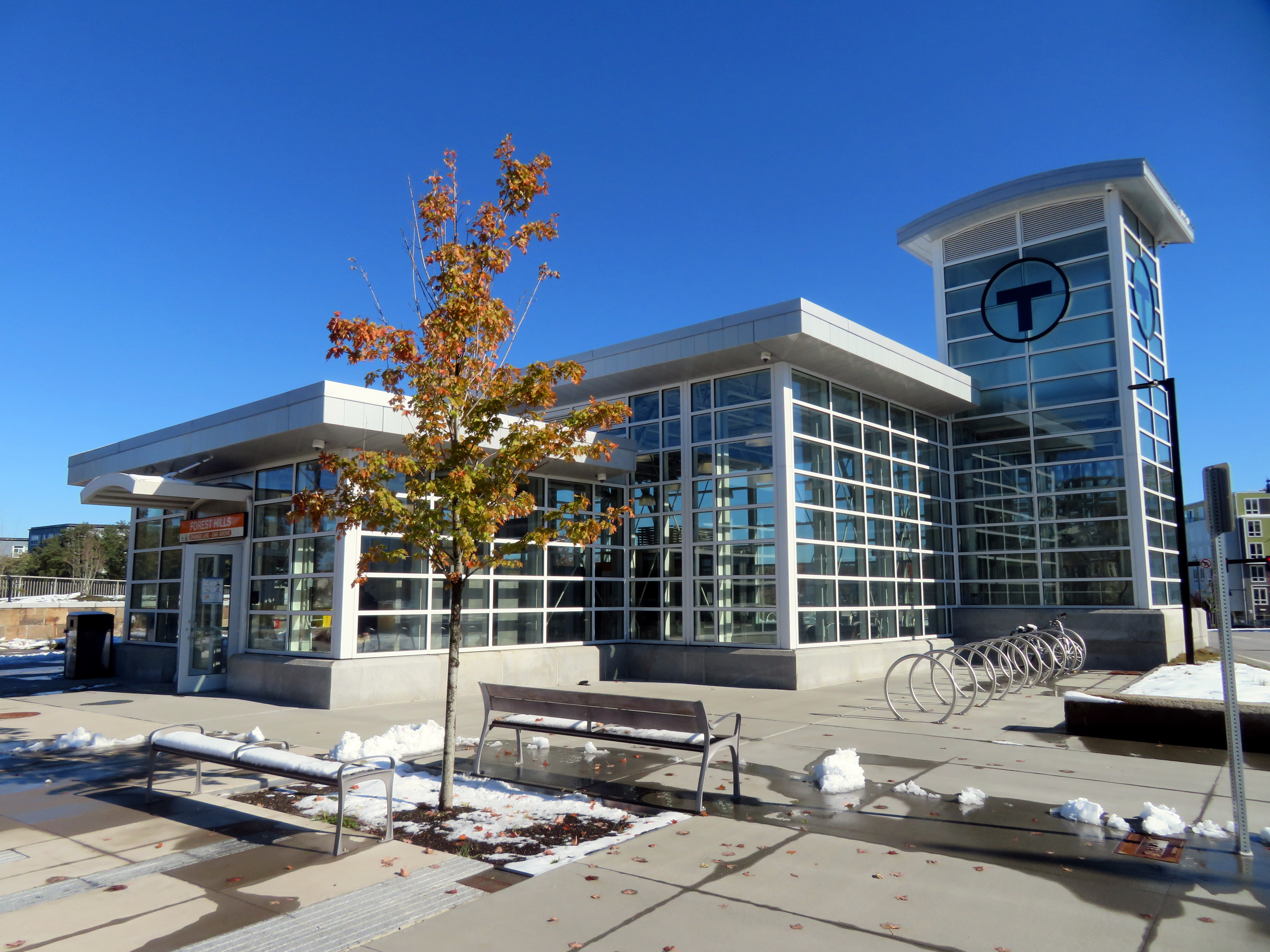
The new north headhouse in 2020

The $38 million station, designed by Cambridge Seven Associates, was constructed of brick, steel and glass; it was meant to resemble a greenhouse to fit in with the surrounding parks. The station's $120,000 clock tower has become a local landmark; it is mirrored by four interior clocks. Orange Line service on the El ended on May 4, 1987, and began on the Southwest Corridor on May 7. The corridor reopened to commuter rail and Amtrak on October 5, 1987, though Needham Line service did not resume until October 19.

The new station included streetcar loops on the north end of the station for the relocated Arborway station, also signed as "Forest Hills", to allow closer connections than were available at Arborway. The small station included waiting shelters, maps and a turnaround loop. On December 28, 1985, the Arborway Line (Green Line E branch) service was "temporarily" suspended while construction work was performed in the Huntington Avenue subway. Service was restored to Brigham Circle on July 26, 1986, and Heath Street on November 4, 1989. However, service was never restored to Forest Hills due to the MBTA's objection to running streetcars in mixed traffic. Restoration of Green Line trolley service to Arborway was part of air pollution remediation promised for the Big Dig, but a lawsuit mandating the return of service was defeated in court in January 2011, nullifying plans to restore service.

=== 21st century ===
A bicycle cage – the first MBTA "Pedal and Park" cage in Boston – opened at Forest Hills on September 28, 2009. Work performed as part of the Casey Overpass removal, which began in 2015, involved a rebuilt upper busway and a second Orange Line headhouse. The canopy was constructed as a $11 million change order to the Arborway project. The never-used Green Line loops and waiting area near the north entrance to Forest Hills were demolished. Route 39 buses, which used the streetcar loops, were permanently rerouted to the upper busway on October 14, 2017. The new headhouse opened on November 6, 2019.

In August 2020, the MBTA awarded a $6.9 million design contract for additional renovations including repair or replacement of the curtain wall, replacement of the existing elevators, and a new elevator connecting the two busways. Design work began in April 2021; by November 2023, it was expected to be completed in mid-2024. As of December 2024, design work is ongoing and the scope of the project will depend on funding.

On April 5, 2021, the final weekday outbound Providence/Stoughton Line train began stopping at Forest Hills to serve as a transfer train to the Needham Line, as the final weekday Needham-bound train originates there. The entire Orange Line was closed from August 19 to September 18, 2022. Some Providence/Stoughton Line trains stopped at the station to provide alternate service; some Franklin Line trains began stopping on September 3. Some of the additional commuter rail stopping service – eight peak Franklin Line trains and one midday train to Providence – was retained after the Orange Line closure.
