= Massachusetts Route 203 =

State highway in Suffolk County, Massachusetts, US

Route 203
- Route 203 highlighted in red

Route information
- Maintained by Massachusetts DCR and MassDOT
- Length: 5.34 mi (8.59 km)
- Existed: early 1970s–present

Major junctions
- West end: Centre Street in Boston
- Route 28 in Boston
- East end: I-93 / US 1 / Route 3 / Route 3A in Boston

Location
- Country: United States
- State: Massachusetts
- Counties: Suffolk

Highway system
- Massachusetts State Highway System; Interstate; US; State
← US 202	→ Route 204

Route 203 is a 5.34-mile-long (8.59 km) east-west state highway located wholly within the city of Boston, Massachusetts. The western terminus is at Centre Street (formerly U.S. Route 1) in Jamaica Plain and the eastern terminus is at the Southeast Expressway (Interstate 93 / US 1 / Route 3) and Route 3A in Neponset. Route 203 is poorly signed, but runs along part of the Arborway, Morton Street and Gallivan Boulevard, all parkways formerly part of the Metropolitan District Commission system of parks and roads.

== Maintenance ==
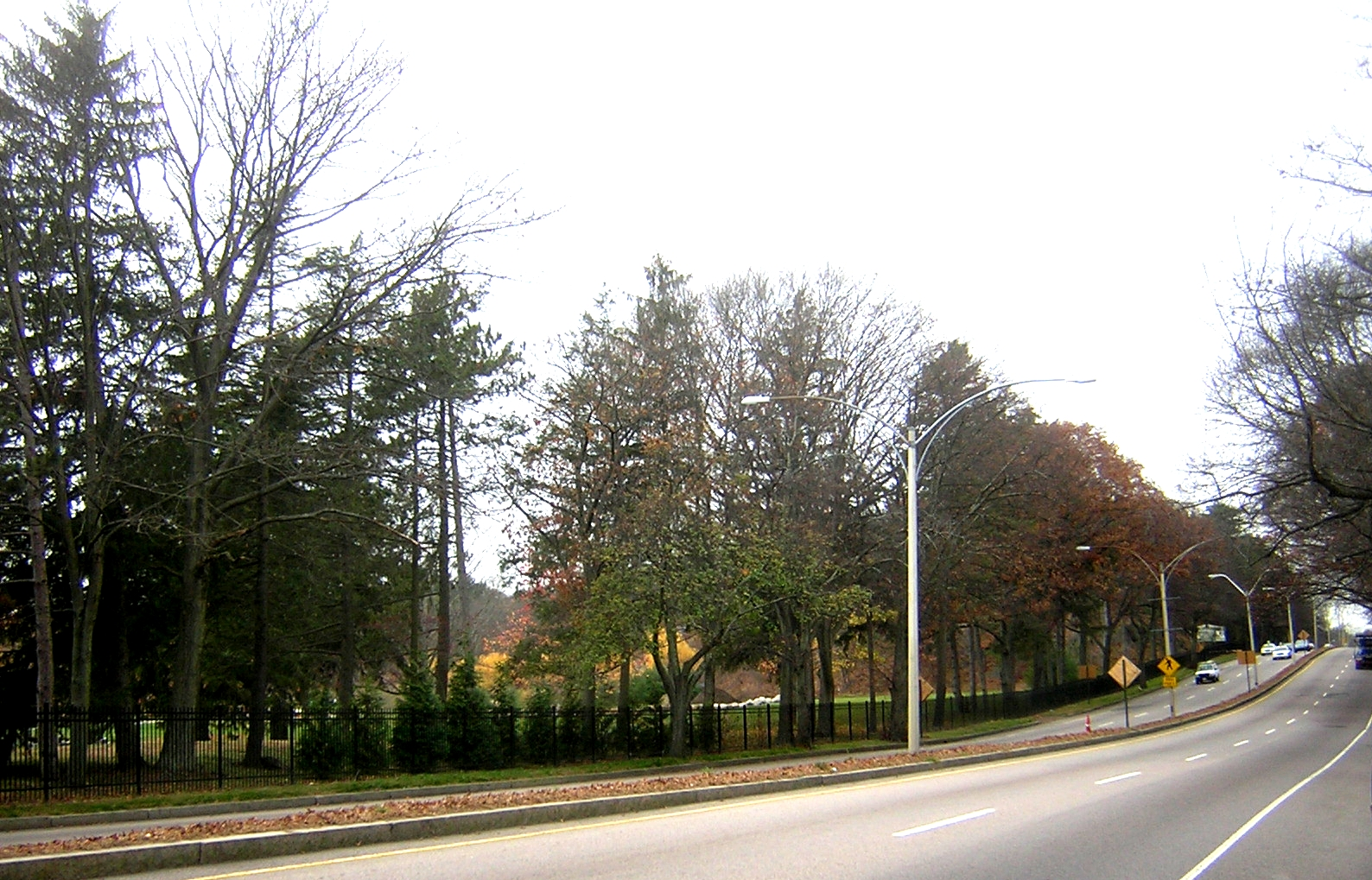
Morton Street

Prior to the creation of the Massachusetts Department of Transportation (MassDOT) in 2009, the route was owned and maintained by the Department of Conservation and Recreation (DCR, previously the Metropolitan District Commission). On November 1, 2009, the Msgr. William Casey Highway overpass in Jamaica Plain, Morton Street in Mattapan and Gallivan Boulevard in Dorchester were transferred to MassDOT, while the Arborway continues to be maintained under the DCR.

== History ==
Route 203 was designated in the early 1970s as part of a large Boston-area renumbering. Most of the route had been part of Route 3, which came south along the Jamaicaway with US 1 and split to the east onto the Arborway and along present Route 203. Route 3 turned south at Granite Avenue to join the Southeast Expressway in Milton, and Route 3A began southbound at the same location.

With the renumbering, Route 3 was rerouted onto the Southeast Expressway (I-93) into downtown, Route 3A was truncated to its current end in Neponset (although it is technically concurrent with Route 3 between Boston and Burlington), and the former alignment of Routes 3 and 3A were redesignated as Route 203. While the former routes had been signed north–south, the new route was signed east–west to better reflect its actual direction of travel.

In the 1980s, US 1 was removed from its surface alignment in Boston and instead cosigned with I-95 and I-93. As a result, Route 203 no longer terminates at a numbered route at its western end.

== Major intersections ==
The entire route is in Boston, Suffolk County.

Location	mi	km	Destinations	Notes
Jamaica Plain	0.000	0.000	Centre Street / Arborway north	Western terminus, Arborway continues north To Route 9/ and To Route 109 via west
Forest Hills	1.1	1.8	Circuit Drive	Southern terminus of Arborway
Mattapan	2.581	4.154	Route 28 (Blue Hill Avenue)	
Neponset	5.34	8.59	I-93 / US 1 / Route 3 north – Boston Route 3A south / Neponset Avenue – Neponset, Quincy; Morrissey Boulevard north	Eastern terminus; exit 12 on I-93. Partial interchange, no access to I-93 south from Route 203 east, or from I-93 to Route 203. Access via Granite Avenue (exit 11). Northern terminus of Route 3A (southern segment).
1.000 mi = 1.609 km; 1.000 km = 0.621 mi: Incomplete access; Route transition
