= Michelle Johnson (journalist) =

American journalist and educator

- Education: University of Maryland, College Park; Columbia University
- Occupations: Journalist, academic
- Awards: John S. Knight Fellowship (1993)

Michelle Johnson is an American journalist and educator. She worked in various roles at The Boston Globe and Boston.com and co-founded the New England chapter of the National Lesbian and Gay Journalists Association. Johnson was an associate professor of the practice at the Boston University College of Communication where she taught journalism.

== Early life and education ==
Michelle Johnson is the daughter of Doris Yarborough Johnson and Melvin Johnson. Her maternal grandmother, Annie Mae Peak Yarborough, was a grade-school-educated woman who prioritized her children’s success, raising them in Baltimore after her husband, Dowd Yarborough, died under mysterious circumstances. Annie Mae was born in Spartanburg, South Carolina.

Johnson earned a B.A. in journalism from the University of Maryland, College Park and a M.S. in journalism from Columbia University Graduate School of Journalism.

== Career ==
Johnson began her career as a copy editor for The Evening Press in Binghamton, New York. She later joined The Boston Globe where she held several roles, including copy editor, layout editor, assistant political editor, senior assistant night editor, and copy desk supervisor.

In 1993, Johnson was selected as one of twelve journalists to participate in the John S. Knight Journalism Fellowships at Stanford. During this fellowship, she became interested in personal computers and their potential in journalism. Returning to The Boston Globe, she served as an assistant business editor and later joined the team launching Boston.com, a regional news website.

In 1992, she co-founded the New England chapter of the National Lesbian and Gay Journalists Association (NLGJA) with a colleague. She advocated for fair coverage of marginalized communities and representation within journalism, obtaining health insurance for her domestic partner at The Boston Globe.

Johnson transitioned to academia, initially as an adjunct professor at Boston University College of Communication and a guest faculty member at the Maynard Institute for Journalism Education's multimedia editing program. She was later hired as an associate professor of the practice at Boston University, teaching multimedia journalism. She served as technology manager at Emerson College's School of Communication and journalist-in-residence for three years before returning to Boston University.

Throughout her academic career, she mentored students at conferences hosted by organizations like the National Association of Black Journalists (NABJ) and UNITY Journalists. In 2013, the NABJ named her Journalism Educator of the Year.

== Personal life ==
Johnson is married to Myrna Greenfield. They were among the first same-sex couples to marry legally in Massachusetts after the 2004 legalization of same-sex marriage in the state.

In her retirement, Johnson conducted on a genealogical research to uncover her family’s history, focusing on ancestors who had been enslaved. She visited libraries and historical sites in North and South Carolina, uncovering detailed records and connecting with her heritage.

Johnson resides in Jamaica Plain, Boston.
