= Arborway =

Parkway in Boston, Massachusetts

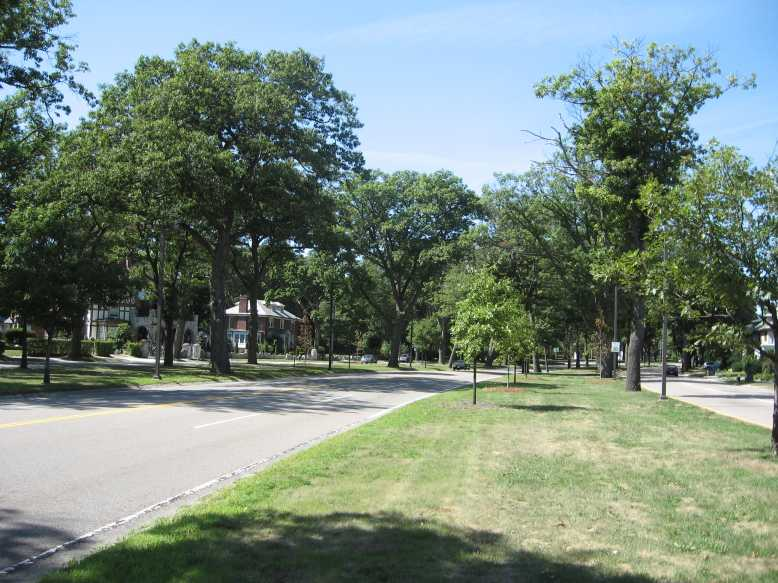
- The Arborway, between Jamaica Pond and the Arnold Arboretum.
- Interactive map of Arborway
- Maintained by: Department of Conservation and Recreation
- Length: 1.6 mi (2.6 km)
- Location: Emerald Necklace, Boston, Massachusetts
- West end: Pond Street in Jamaica Plain
- East end: Route 203 (Morton Street) in Forest Hills

Other
- Designer: Frederick Law Olmsted

The Arborway consists of a four-lane, divided parkway and a two-lane residential street in the Jamaica Plain neighborhood of Boston, Massachusetts, United States. It was designed by Frederick Law Olmsted in the 1890s as the southernmost carriage road in a series of parkways connecting parks from Boston Common in downtown Boston to Franklin Park in Roxbury. This park system has since become known as the Emerald Necklace.

It was included in the landscape complex called the Olmsted Park that was placed on the National Register of Historic Places on December 8, 1971.

== Description ==
The Arborway begins at a large rotary that connects it with the Jamaicaway, and curves past the main entrance of Arnold Arboretum (125 Arborway), where on-street parking is allowed. The roadway once continued through Forest Hills to the edge of Franklin Park, but now ends at the South Street border of the Arboretum. From there, traffic exits into Forest Hills next to Forest Hills Station. The entire roadway is signed as Massachusetts Route 203, which continues along the parkway as Morton Street.

== Casey Overpass ==
Named Monsignor William J. Casey Overpass in honor of a Depression-era priest of St. Thomas Aquinas Church in Jamaica Plain, the overpass was opened in November 1953 to allow the increasing automobile traffic of the day to bypass the north-south traffic on Washington Street, South Street, and Hyde Park Avenue. In the 2000s, community groups were investigating the possibility of fixing this "missing link" in the Emerald Necklace. The Massachusetts Department of Transportation determined the overpass "structurally deficient" in 2010 and started work on replacing it with an at-grade roadway. The overpass was demolished in 2015.

== Major intersections ==
The entire route is in the city of Boston.

Location	mi	km	Destinations	Notes
Jamaica Plain	0.0	0.0	Francis Parkman Drive / Pond Street / Jamaicaway north	Traffic circle; southern terminus of Jamaicaway
Jamaica Plain	0.4	0.64	Centre Street	Traffic circle; western terminus of Route 203
Forest Hills	1.6	2.6	Route 203 east (Morton Street) / Circuit Drive	Route 203 continues east as Morton Street
1.000 mi = 1.609 km; 1.000 km = 0.621 mi: Route transition

== See also ==
- Arborway (MBTA station)
- M.T.A. (song)
