= Jamaicaway =

Street in Boston, Massachusetts

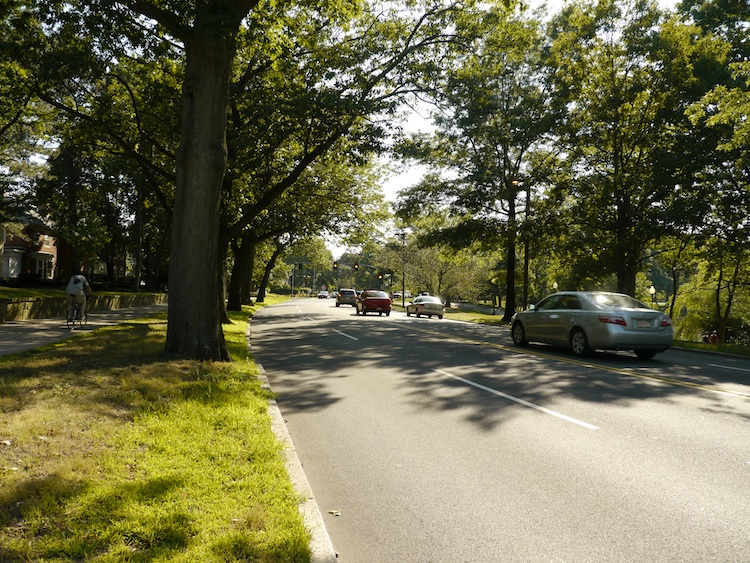
- The Jamaicaway in 2011
- Interactive map of Jamaicaway
- Maintained by: Department of Conservation and Recreation
- Length: 1.5 mi (2.4 km)
- Location: Emerald Necklace, Boston, Massachusetts
- South end: Arborway in Jamaica Plain
- North end: Route 9 / Riverway in Mission Hill

Other
- Designer: Frederick Law Olmsted

The Jamaicaway is a four-lane, undivided parkway in the Jamaica Plain neighborhood of Boston, Massachusetts, adjacent to the nearby neighborhood of Brookline.

== History ==
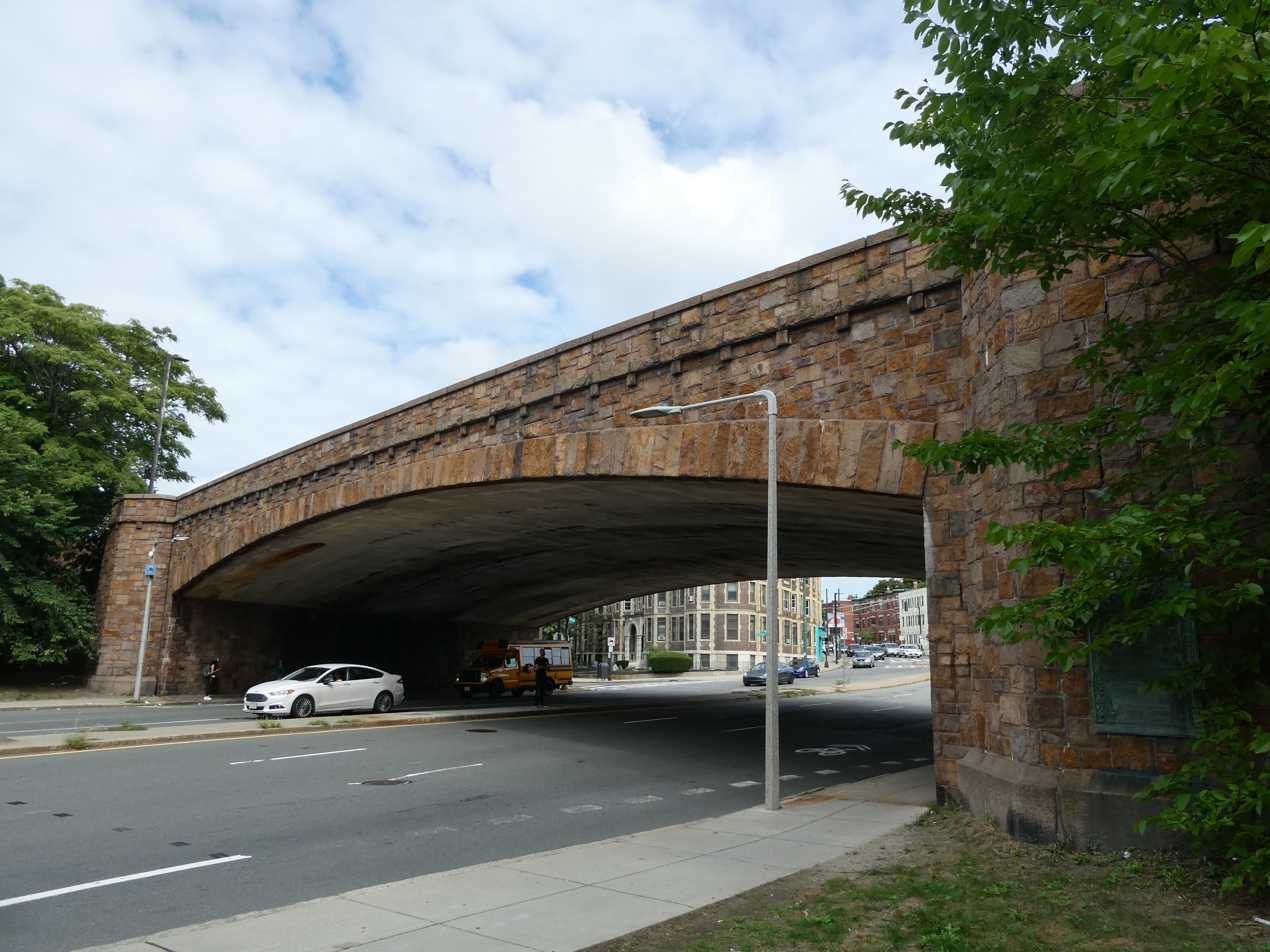
Bridge over Massachusetts Route 9 completed in 1936

The Jamaicaway was designed by Frederick Law Olmsted as part of the Emerald Necklace of green spaces, extending from Boston Common on Beacon Hill to Franklin Park in Roxbury. It connects Riverway in the north with Arborway in the south.

Designed with carriages in mind during an era when Jamaica Plain was a sparsely inhabited streetcar suburb, the Jamaicaway is now a heavily-traveled route for motor vehicles connecting central areas of Boston (especially the Longwood Medical and Academic Area) with areas to the southwest, including Forest Hills, West Roxbury and the densely populated suburbs of Norfolk County. The winding nature and narrow lanes of the road, and its heavy use by commuters leads to many vehicle collisions.

Many of the houses which line the Jamaicaway are large and of architectural interest. The oldest houses were created by elite Bostonians for year-round or seasonal use. The person most mentioned in association with the Jamaicaway today is probably James Michael Curley, the Irish American Mayor of Boston whose former house was long easy to spot, even after Curley's death, by the shamrock design incised in its shutters.

== Major intersections ==
The entire route is in Boston, Suffolk County.

Location	mi	km	Destinations	Notes
Jamaica Plain	0.0	0.0	Pond Street / Francis Parkman Drive / Arborway south – Dedham, Providence	Traffic circle; northern terminus of Arborway
Mission Hill	1.5	2.4	Route 9 / Riverway north – Copley Square, Brookline	Interchange; southern terminus of Riverway
1.000 mi = 1.609 km; 1.000 km = 0.621 mi
