= Morton Street =

Street in Boston, Massachusetts

- Morton Street, Metropolitan Park System of Greater Boston
- U.S. National Register of Historic Places
- U.S. Historic district
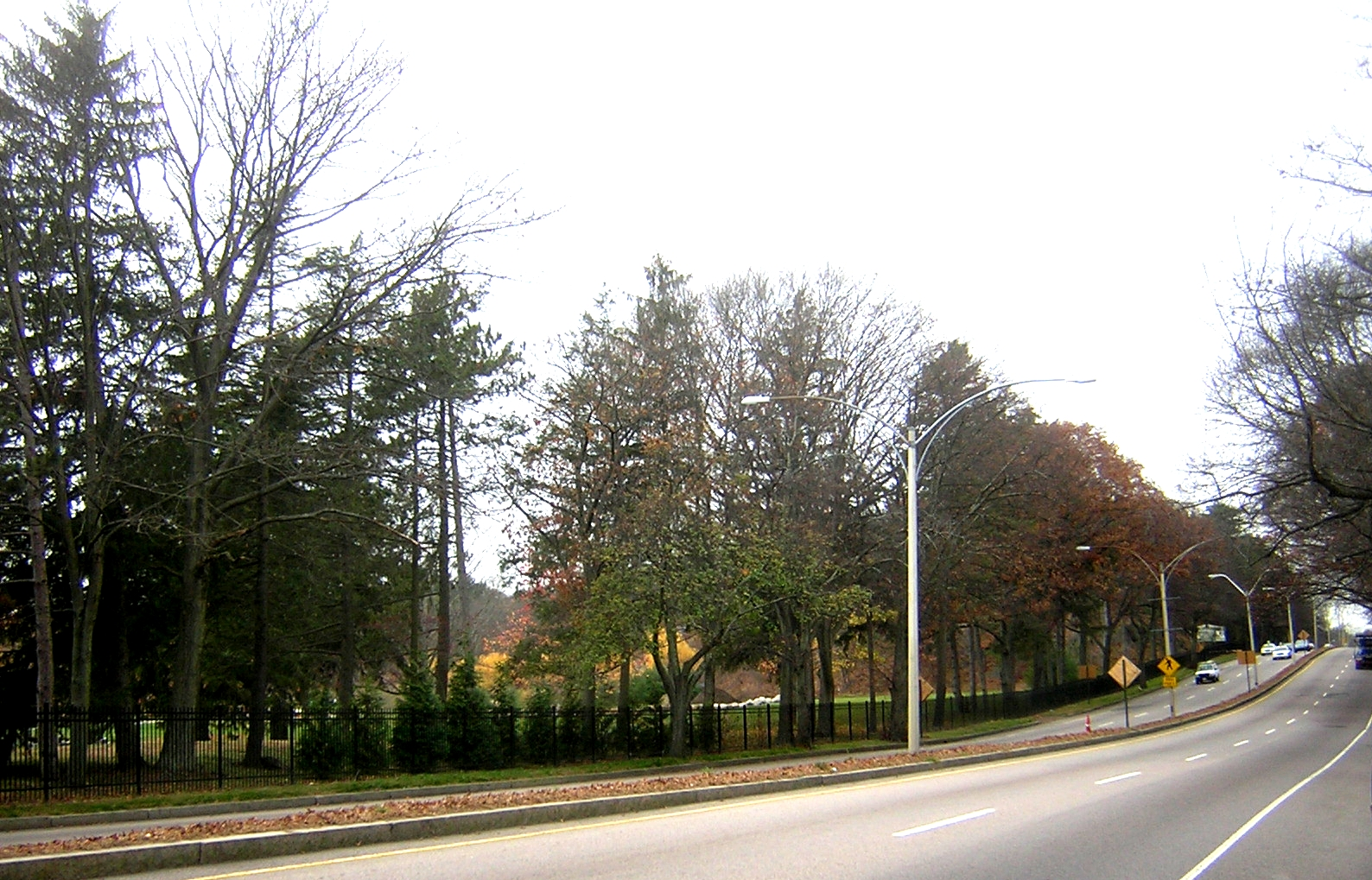

- Location within Massachusetts Location within the United States
- Location: Morton St. between Arborway and Gallivan Boulevard, Boston, Massachusetts
- Area: 13 acres (5.3 ha)
- Built: 1930
- Built by: City of Boston Dept. of Public Works
- MPS: Metropolitan Park System of Greater Boston MPS
- NRHP reference No.: 04001572
- Added to NRHP: January 24, 2005

Morton Street is a street in southern Boston, Massachusetts, United States. It extends from the southeastern end of the Arborway in Jamaica Plain to Washington Street in the Lower Mills Village of Dorchester. Most of the road is a connecting parkway, signed as part of Massachusetts Route 203, that provides access to Boston's Emerald Necklace of parks. That portion of the road was listed on the National Register of Historic Places in 2005.

== Route ==
Morton Street's northwestern terminus is at the southern access road paralleling the Arborway a short distance east of the Forest Hills MBTA station in southern Jamaica Plain. It is narrow and one-way in the northwestern direction until the James B. Shea Memorial Circle, which is the southeastern terminus of the Arborway. Morton Street continues southeasterly from the circle as a four-lane divided parkway signed Massachusetts 203, flanked on the southwest by Forest Hills Cemetery and the northeast by Franklin Park. These are bounded by the American Legion Highway, with which Morton Street has a grade-separated interchange. It passes several smaller park areas until it reaches Harvard Street, after which it becomes much more urbanized.

As the road approaches Blue Hill Avenue, the central median tapers away. It is typically lined by closely spaced wood-frame residential construction, except at the major road junctions, which have commercial or mixed commercial-residential buildings. Gallivan Boulevard continues the parkway setting in an easterly direction at an angled junction a short way southeast of the Morton Street MBTA station, and Morton Street continues as a four-lane road another half mile before reaching its end at Washington Street, just north of the Lower Mills Village center. The last section features slightly more generous spacing between the buildings lining the roadway.

== History ==
Morton Street was probably built by either the city or the state in the 1930s. It and the connecting Arborway and Gallivan Boulevard were all maintained by the city until a financial crisis in the city prompted them to be turned over to the Metropolitan District Commission (MDC), predecessor to today's Massachusetts Department of Conservation and Recreation. Even though its parkway section was not built by the MDC, it was built with sensitivity to the standards the MDC applied in the construction of many other parkways in the Greater Boston area. The parkway portion of the road (between Shea Circle and Gallivan Boulevard) is listed on the National Register of Historic Places.

== See also ==
- National Register of Historic Places listings in southern Boston, Massachusetts
