= Jamaica Plain =

Neighborhood in Boston

Coordinates: 42°18′27″N 71°06′47″W

- Neighborhood of Boston
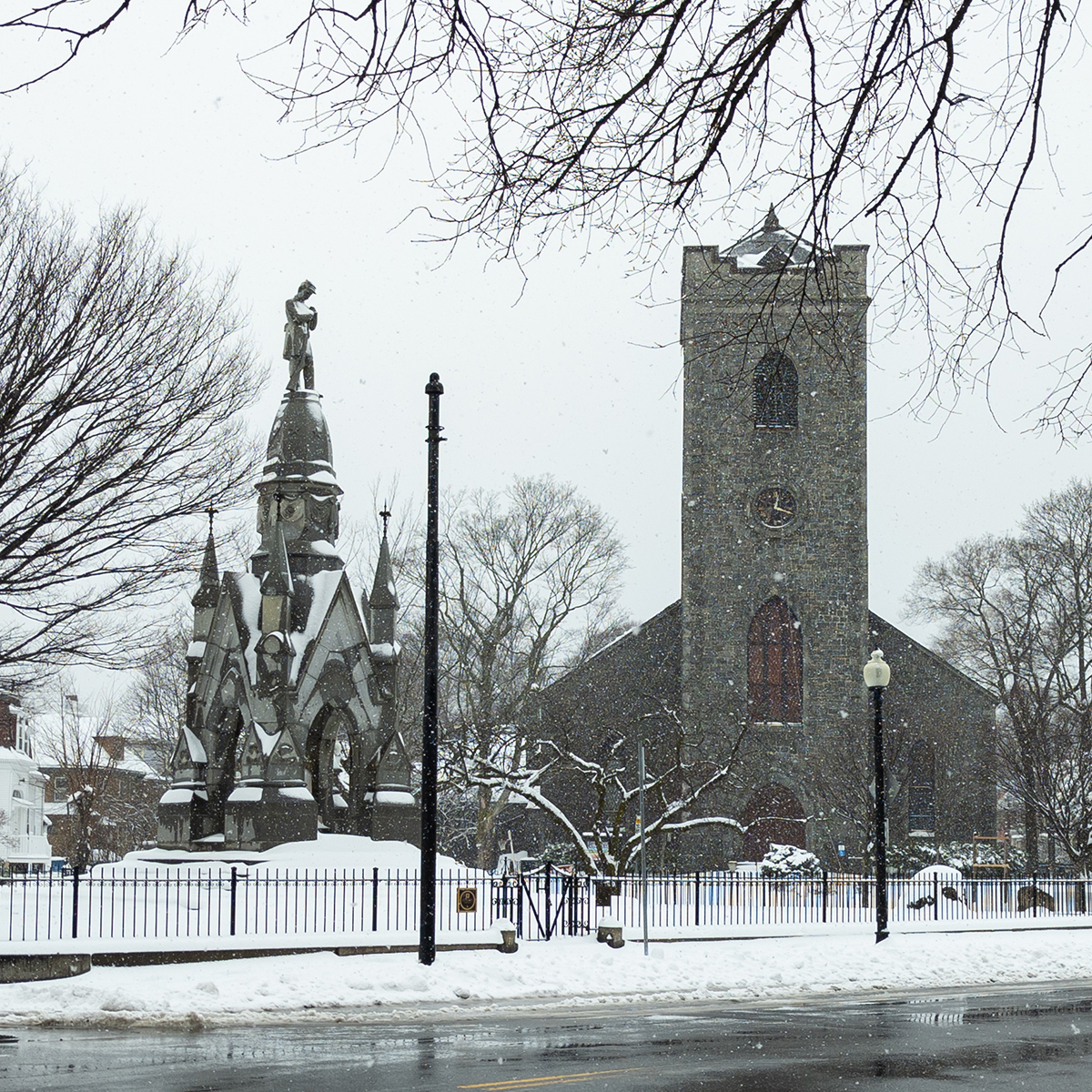
- Soldier's Monument and First Unitarian Universalist Church in Jamaica Plain
- Nickname: JP
- Interactive map of Jamaica Plain
- Country: United States
- State: Massachusetts
- County: Suffolk
- Neighborhood of: Boston
- Annexed by Boston: 1874

Population (2020)
  - Total: 41,012
- Time zone: UTC−5 (Eastern)
- Postal codes: 02130 and a portion of School Street in 02119
- Area code: 617/857
- Website: Official website

Jamaica Plain is a neighborhood of 4.4 square miles (11 km^{2}) in Boston, Massachusetts, United States. Settled by Puritans seeking farmland to the south, it was originally part of Roxbury. The community seceded from Roxbury during the formation of West Roxbury in 1851 and became part of Boston when West Roxbury was annexed in 1874. In the 19th century, Jamaica Plain became one of the first streetcar suburbs in America and home to a significant portion of Boston's Emerald Necklace of parks, designed by Frederick Law Olmsted.

In 2020, Jamaica Plain had a population of 41,012 according to the United States census.

== History ==
=== Colonial era ===
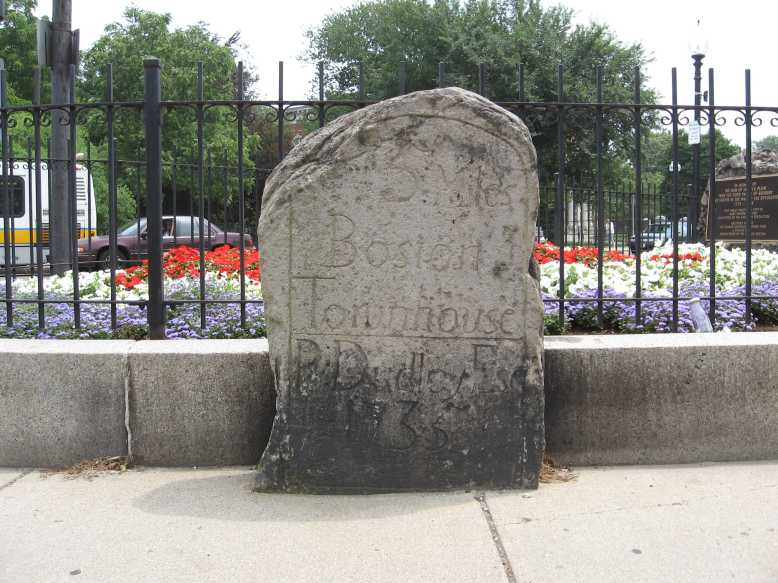
This milestone marking five miles (8 km) from the Boston Town House, now the site of the Old State House in downtown Boston, was placed on Centre Street by Paul Dudley in 1735.

Shortly after the founding of Boston and Roxbury in 1630, William Heath's family and three others settled on land just south of Parker Hill in what is now Jamaica Plain. In the next few years, William Curtis, John May and others set up farms nearby along Stony Brook, which flowed from south to north from Turtle Pond (in Hyde Park) to an outlet in the Charles River marshes in the current filled-in Fens area of Boston. John Polley followed with a farm which he purchased from Lt. Joshua Hewe in 1659 at the site of the present-day Soldier's Monument at the intersection of South and Centre streets, closer to the "Great Pond", later known as Jamaica Pond. Later, for services rendered during the Pequot War, Joseph Weld received a grant of 278 acres (1.1 km^{2}) of land between South Street and Centre Street. His son John built a home along South Street in the area which is now the Arnold Arboretum. The Weld family continued to live in the area for many generations.

In the late 1650s, the name "Jamaica" first appears on maps for the area of Roxbury between Stony Brook and the Great Pond. There are a number of theories regarding the origin of the name "Jamaica Plain". A well-known theory traces the origin to "Jamaica rum", a reference to Jamaican cane sugar's role in the Triangle Trade of sugar, rum, and slaves. There were taverns on the Road to Dedham in the vicinity of Jamaica Plain. Another explanation is that "Jamaica", though a different letter "A" pronunciation, is an anglicization of the name of Kuchamakin, brother of Chickatawbut, the deceased sachem (chief) of the Massachusett tribe, who ruled the tribe as regent to Chickataubut's minor son, Josias Wampatuck. In 1655, the English navy took the island of Jamaica from the Spanish, so it is also possible the area was named to honor this recent British victory.

On some maps, until the mid-19th century, the area was marked as "Jamaica Plains".

John Ruggles and Hugh Thomas donated land in 1676 for the building of the community's first school. A gift of 75 acres (30 ha) of land south of the "Great Pond" by John Eliot provided financial support for the school, which was named the Eliot School (which still exists) in his honor.

During the 18th century, the farms of the Jamaica section of Roxbury transitioned from subsistence to market orientation, serving the growing Boston population. At the same time, wealthy men bought land and built estates in the bucolic countryside. In 1740, Benjamin Faneuil, nephew of Boston merchant Peter Faneuil, bought land between Centre Street and Stony Brook. In 1752, Commodore Joshua Loring bought the old Polley farm and built a home to which he retired. At Jamaica Pond, the provincial governor, Francis Bernard, built a summer home on 60 acres (24 ha).

In 1769, the community's first church was built paid for by Susannah and Benjamin Pemberton before permission was granted from the two existing parishes of Roxbury. After many appeals and bargains, the families along South Street and to the west were released by the Second Parish in 1772 and the Third Parish of Roxbury was incorporated, and on May 26, 1773, the colonial legislature granted an act "setting off the nine families and their lands from the First Precinct (or parish) of the Town of Roxbury and annexing to the Third Precinct in the said town." During the occupation of Boston, the colonial assembly met in this building. The church was the only one in Jamaica Plain for seventy years. During that time it became affiliated with the Unitarian church and continues to be known as the First Church in Jamaica Plain. The original white clapboard building was replaced by a stone Romanesque Revival building designed by the architect Nathaniel Bradlee in 1854.

The Minutemen from the Third Parish fought at Lexington and Bunker Hill under the command of Captain Lemuel Child and are commemorated on a plaque next to the Civil War Monument.

In 1775, troops from Rhode Island and Connecticut were quartered with residents of Jamaica Plain. General Washington stationed troops on Weld Hill, today's Bussey Hill in the Arnold Arboretum. The units protected the road south to Dedham (Centre Street), where the American arsenal was kept, in case the British broke the siege of Boston.

With the American Revolution, many of the Tory estate owners fled the country, and were replaced by the rising elite of the new Boston. In 1777, John Hancock purchased an estate near the pond. The widow Ann Doane bought the estate once owned by Loyalist Joshua Loring (which is still standing, as the Loring-Greenough House). She soon was remarried, to attorney David S. Greenough. When Samuel Adams became governor of Massachusetts, he bought the former Peacock Tavern. It was located on Centre Street (near today's Allandale Street and the Faulkner Hospital). With his wealth made in the China trade, James Perkins built his home, Pinebank, overlooking Jamaica Pond in 1802.

=== Revolution to annexation ===
The early years of the 19th century continued the trends of the post-Independence years. An aqueduct was built to Boston and inner Roxbury by the Jamaica Pond Aqueduct Corporation, which provided water to Boston, Roxbury and later the Town of West Roxbury, from 1795 to 1886. Carriages carried people to Roxbury and Boston on Centre Street (then, the Highway to Dedham), and in 1806 on the new Norfolk and Bristol Turnpike toll road (present day Washington Street). In 1826, "hourlies" ran from Jamaica Plain to Roxbury and Boston on a regular schedule, and the 1830s brought larger "omnibuses" to carry the growing passenger base. The first train line reached Jamaica Plain in 1834 when the Boston and Providence Rail Road began service, with special low "commuter" fares offered residents in 1839. Stops at Boylston Street and Tollgate (present day Forest Hills) were joined by a station at Woolsey Square (Green Street) at the request of local residents.

Green Street, laid out in 1836 to connect Centre Street and the Toll road, (Washington Street) became a hub of local artisans and builders. Soon after, Centre Street near Green Street became a retail main street, with grocers attracting local business providing products from the West Indies and common household goods. During the 1840s, as commuters from Boston settled in Jamaica Plain, the local market grew, with artisans and businesses - with proprietors living in the community - providing much of the needed products and services. In the Stony Brook valley along the rail line adjacent to Roxbury, a small industrial center formed, with small chemical factories, tanneries and soap factories taking advantage of the running water, isolation, access to transportation, and available land. Reflecting the growing population, a number of new churches were built. Four churches opened and served the new, more varied population.

By 1850, the once agricultural community had seen a significant change in its population. Only 10% of its heads of household were listed as farmers, while 28% were businessmen and professionals, and another 20% were Irish-born. In an effort to stem the increase in property taxes to support the rapidly urbanizing inner Roxbury area, the owners of the large estates in Jamaica Plain led a successful effort in 1851 to secede from Roxbury and form a new, suburban town of West Roxbury. Meanwhile, growth continued unabated. In 1850, David S. Greenough developed the south end of his family land into four streets, including today's McBride Street. Three years later, he sold land along the east side of the railroad tracks for the new Jamaica Plain Gas Light Company. In 1857, the new West Roxbury Railroad Company extended their horse rail car line to a depot on South Street, at the site of today's public housing project opposite McBride Street.

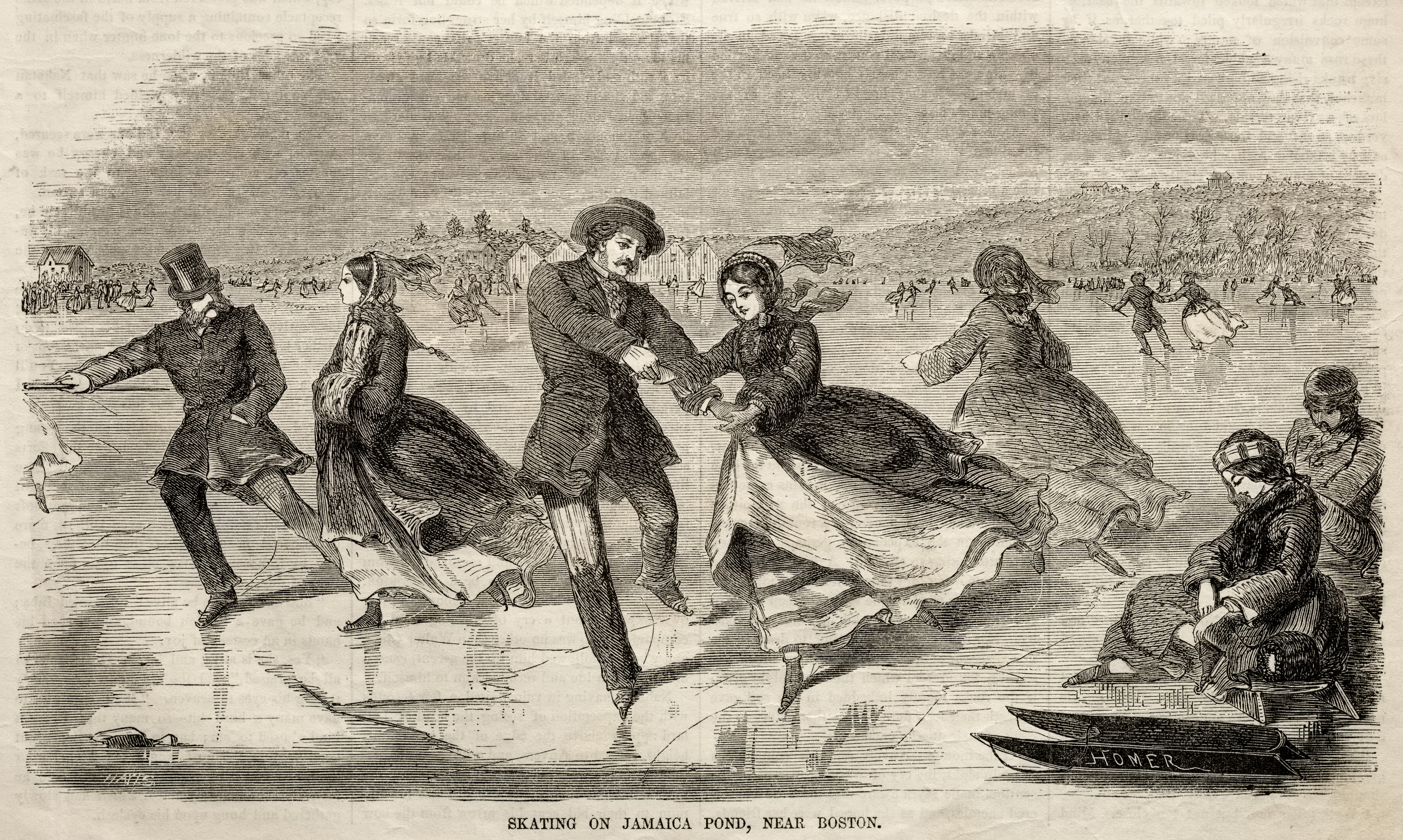
Skating On Jamaica Pond by Winslow Homer, 1859

During the same years, ice houses lined the south shore of Jamaica Pond. Ice was harvested each winter by the Jamaica Plain Ice Company and sold in Boston and beyond until the 1890s, when the City of Boston bought the pond. During the China trade ships going toward the Orient needed ballast and excess harvested ice was used from the Pond. Ships went around Cape Horn up to San Francisco where the ice was sold. Continuing the transportation development that both served Jamaica Plain's commuters and spurred further urban development, the Boston and Providence company added a second track in 1860, a third in 1870, and a fourth in 1890. Many of the new residents were Irish and Catholic, and to serve their needs the Archdiocese of Boston began construction of St Thomas Aquinas Church on South Street, with a grammar school following in 1873. In less than a generation, Jamaica Plain had changed significantly, and the wealthy estate owners no longer held power. In 1873, West Roxbury residents – most living in Jamaica Plain – voted in favor of annexation to Boston. The Town of West Roxbury had grown from 2,700 residents in 1850 to 9,000 in 1875, and many of the new residents wanted the advantages of the services (street grading, sewer lines) that the City of Boston could provide.

=== Formation of Boston neighborhood ===
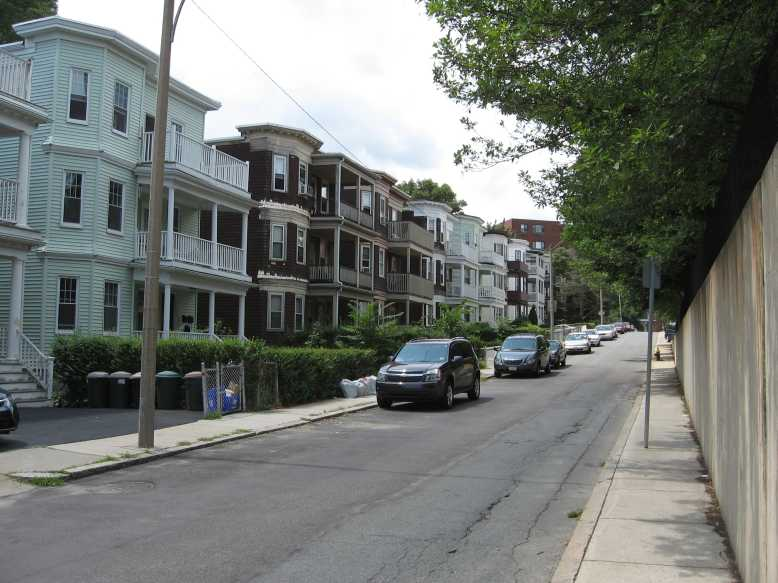
Classic triple deckers on Child Street

As Jamaica Plain became a part of Boston, the rate of growth continued to increase. The triple decker house, a defining image in urban New England architecture, first showed up in the 1870s, and spread rapidly in the 1890s. In Jamaica Plain, the first commercial blocks were built in the 1870s, with the first brick commercial building erected in 1875. In 1873, the imposing brick police station was built on Seaverns Avenue, and a year later the recently built Eliot School was renamed West Roxbury High School, only to be changed to Jamaica Plain High School after annexation. The Stony Brook valley had long been the industrial center of Jamaica Plain. In 1871, the Haffenreffer brewery opened near Boylston and Amory Streets, taking advantage of the Stony Brook aquifer and the presence of German immigrants in the area. The same year, the Boylston Schul Verein German social club opened just across the railroad tracks, one of many organizations that served German residents in the neighborhood. To the south, the B.F. Sturtevant Company opened an industrial fan factory in 1878 along the railroad tracks between Williams and Green Street, which grew to employ 500 employees. In 1901, the factory suffered a massive fire and the company moved to Hyde Park several miles south.

The continued movement of both residents and businesses into the Stony Brook valley brought calls to contain the brook, prevent floods, and provide sewer drainage. During the 1870s, the brook was deepened and contained within wooden walls, but the spring thaw resulted in flooding of surrounding streets, and a new effort. Work continued until 1908, when the brook was placed into a shallow culvert from Forest Hills to its present outlet in the Boston Fens, behind the Museum of Fine Arts, Boston. In the following years, the brook that once defined the industrial heart of Jamaica Plain was largely forgotten, until it was memorialized by the new Stony Brook Orange Line station at Boylston Street.

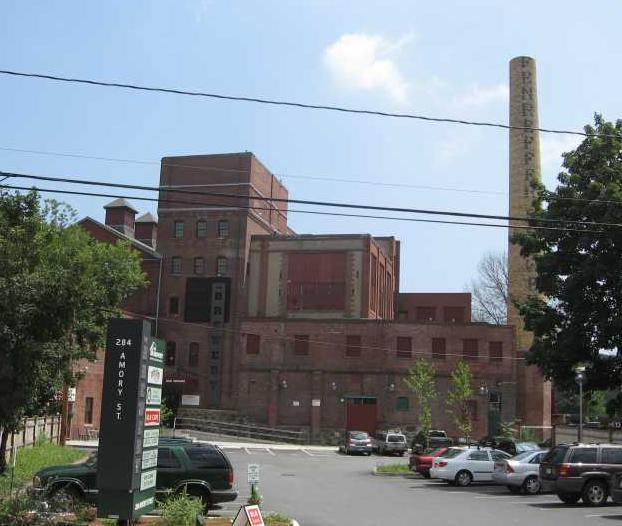
The former Haffenreffer Brewery

Breweries continued to be major employers during these years. On Heath Street, the Highland Spring Brewery had been operating since 1867. In the 1880s, the Eblana and Park breweries and the American Brewing Company opened, taking advantage of local German and Irish immigrants to fill jobs. Franklin Brewery extended the beermaking district to Washington Street. These and other breweries were all closed to beer making during Prohibition, and few survived to reopen after repeal, although many found other uses, and some still stand. An exception was Haffenreffer, which continued until 1964. The old building now houses a number of commercial establishments, including the Boston Beer Company, brewers of Samuel Adams beer, as well as the nonprofit Jamaica Plain Neighborhood Development Corporation. A late survivor was Croft Ale, brewed in the Highland Spring Brewery building until 1953, when it became the Rosoff Pickle factory, where the pickle vats could be seen from the commuter trains passing by.

A notable company that moved to Heath Street after prohibition was the Moxie soft drink company. Invented by Augustin Thompson in Lowell, Massachusetts, in 1876, the company marketed the distinctively flavored Moxie to shift it from medicinal "tonic" to soft drink, much like Coca-Cola, and it outsold Coke in 1920. The company stopped advertising their distinctive product during the Great Depression, and never recovered their lost market share. After the plant closed in 1953, the building was torn down by the City of Boston for the new Bromley Heath public housing projects.

During the late 19th century, Jamaica Plain's housing stock grew with the commercial development, providing homes for workers in local businesses and commuters as well. Sumner Hill, based on the old Greenough estate, became home to business owners and managers. In the 1880s, the Parley Vale estate and Robinwood Avenue were developed to serve the same market. Ten years later, Moss Hill Road and Woodland Road were laid out on land owned by the Bowditch family, creating the most exclusive neighborhood in Jamaica Plain until this day. At the same time, the land off South Street was being developed into streets and filled with houses for the working-class population, especially the Irish. By the early 20th century, the streets of Jamaica Plain were filled in, and houses or businesses were on most buildable plots. The entire housing stock of Jamaica Plain had been owned, divided, financed, built and sold largely by Jamaica Plain residents.

=== Early 20th century ===
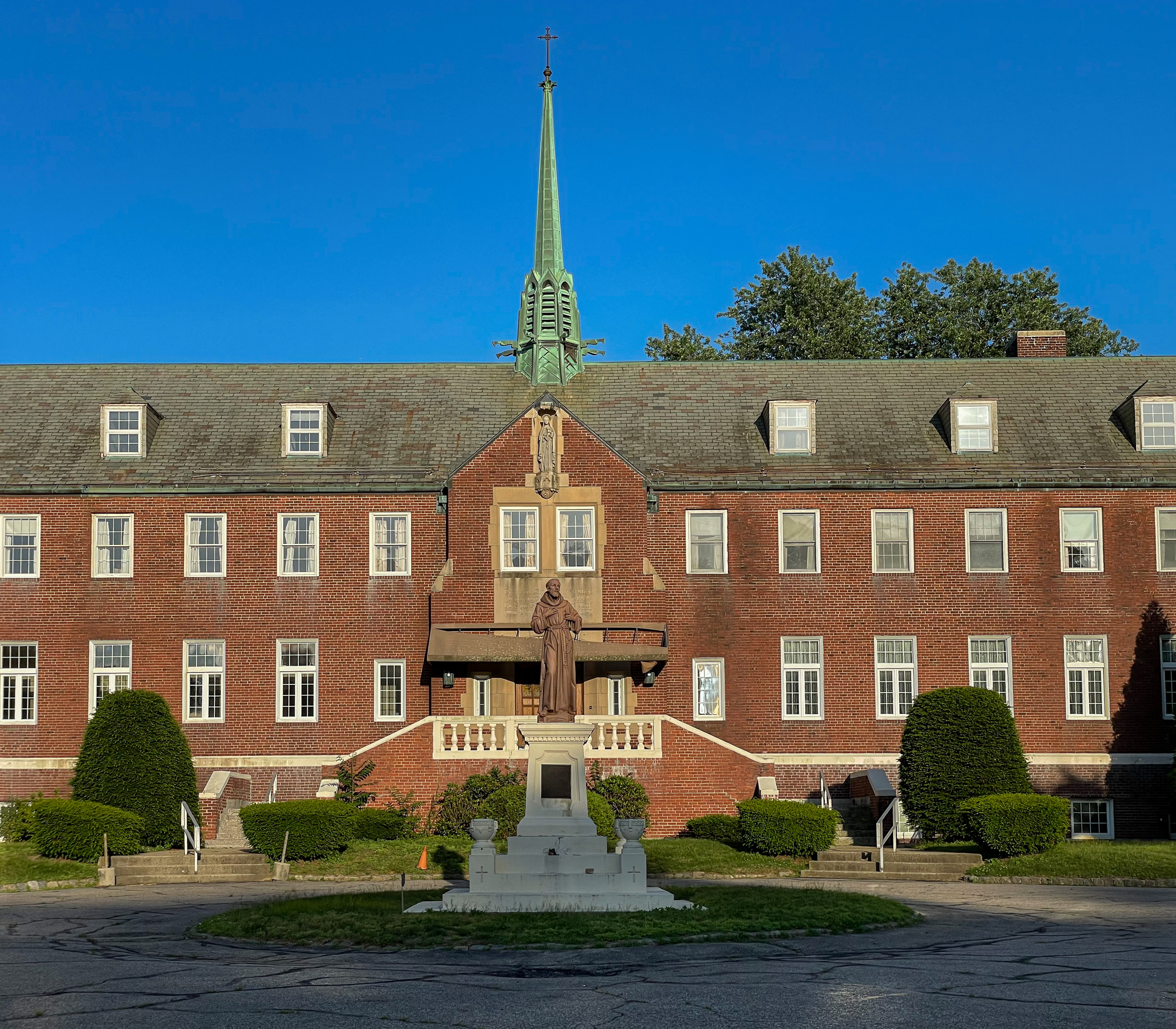
Poor Clare Monastery at Arborway and Centre Street, built 1934

The year 1900 brought another major employer to Jamaica Plain when Thomas Gustave Plant built a factory for his Queen Quality Shoe Company at Centre and Bickford Streets, said to be the largest women's shoe factory in the world at the time, with five thousand workers. In order to avoid the labor strife that was common at the time, the company offered a park beside the factory, recreation rooms, a gym, library, dance hall, and sponsored sports teams that competed in local leagues. Shoes continued to be made in the building until the 1950s, but arson burned the massive brick structure down in 1976. The site is now home to a supermarket.

In 1900, Jamaica Plain had a significant immigrant population, which helped shape the future of the community. Many Irish had settled in large numbers in the Heath Street, South Street, Forest Hills and Stony Brook area (Brookside), taking laboring and domestic jobs, and becoming one-quarter of the population. Germans had reached 14%, living in Hyde Square, Egleston Square and Brookside, employed as skilled workers and managers, with their own social clubs and churches. Canadians, many from the Maritime Provinces, made up 12% of the population, often working in white collar or skilled jobs. Italians would come as well, in the years after 1910. New technologies allowed local businesses to provide jobs into the new century. In the 1910s, Randall-Faichney Company manufactured automobile parts, and the Holtzer-Cabot Company moved from making electric motors and telephone switching equipment to add electric automobiles.

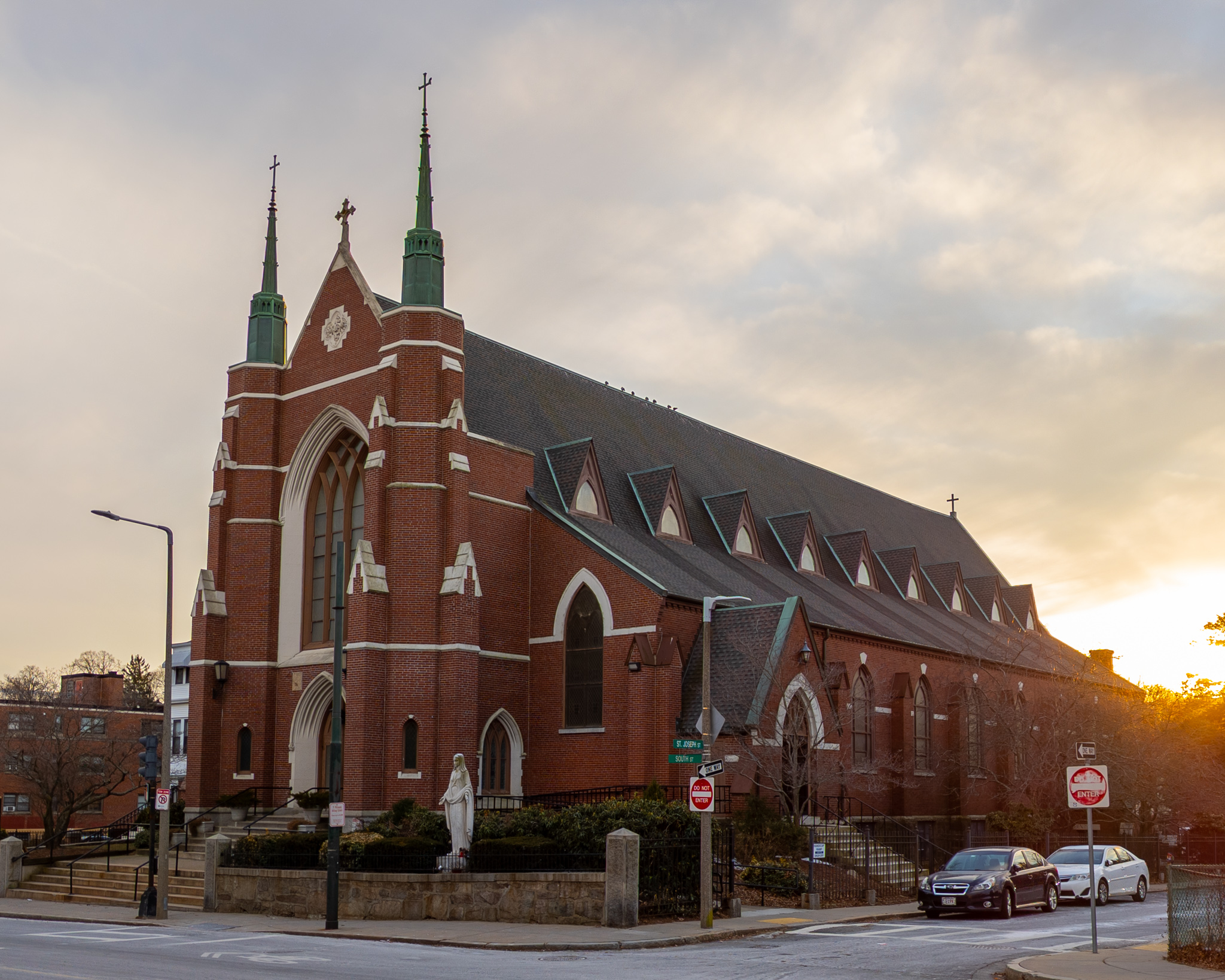
St. Thomas Aquinas Parish in Jamaica Plain at dusk

Religion played a significant part in local life during these years. The increase in Catholic residents resulted in the building of new churches to join St Thomas Aquinas. Our Lady of Lourdes was built in 1896 in Brookside, and Blessed Sacrament, built to serve the residents of Hyde Square, was finished in 1917. St Andrews on Walk Hill street in Forest Hills came soon after. Each church had an elementary school that anchored the parish and bred a strong loyalty in parishioners, and in 1927, St Thomas parish added a high school, which remained open until 1975. Protestant churches inspired a similar local loyalty. Many of the local factory managers served in leadership positions in nearby churches. Central Congregational Church had women's, children's and missionary groups that brought neighbors of different economic classes together.

Other civic associations brought the people of Jamaica Plain together. In 1897, the Jamaica Plain Carnival Association formed to manage and promote the 4th of July parade, contests and fireworks. Two years later, the Jamaica Plain Businessmen's Association formed to promote commercial development. Within three years, prominent community members were invited to join the newly named Jamaica Plain Citizen's Association. The new group worked to encourage road improvement, playgrounds, lectures, schools, and other community amenities. In 1897, the Tuesday Club formed for women (who were not admitted to the other groups), and still exists at the Loring Greenough house.

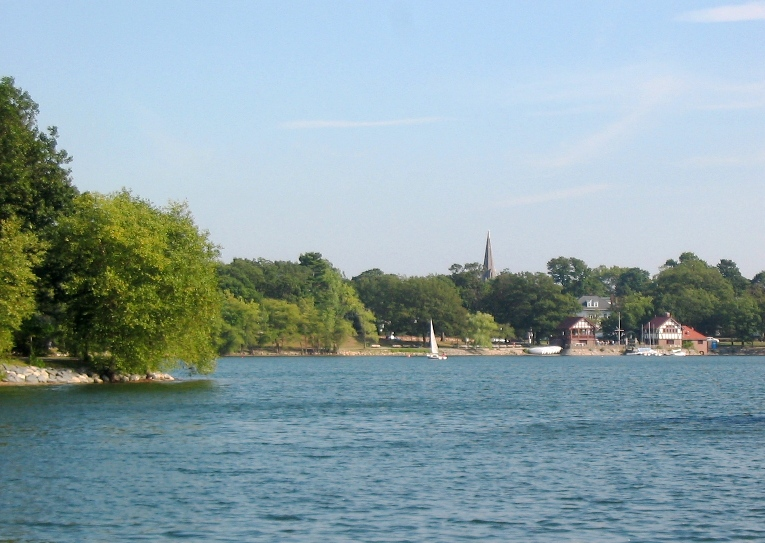
Jamaica Pond, boathouse in distance

In the late 19th century, Boston's Emerald Necklace of parks was designed and built by Frederick Law Olmsted, with much of the southern section of the connecting parkland in or bordering on Jamaica Plain. Olmsted Park, Jamaica Pond, the Arnold Arboretum and Franklin Park have been enjoyed by generations of Jamaica Plain residents. The pond had long been the site of estates, which were torn down to make the new park. Fishing and ice skating were popular pastimes, and each winter ice was removed from the pond before the time of electric refrigeration. With the new park, homes and the commercial icehouses were removed. The Arboretum was developed on land originally owned by the Weld family, and donated by Benjamin Bussey, with financial support from the will of James Arnold. The Arboretum is now owned by the City of Boston, and managed by Harvard University.

Perhaps the most dramatic building project in Jamaica Plain history was the elevation of the train line above grade in the 1890s. In order to avoid accidents at street crossings, an embankment was built from Roxbury south through Forest Hills station, with bridges over all intersecting streets. The embankment cut through most of Jamaica Plain from north to south. In time, the housing along the embankment came to be devalued, and property to the east of the train line was cut off from the higher income sections of the community.

=== Redlining, decline and neighborhood activism ===
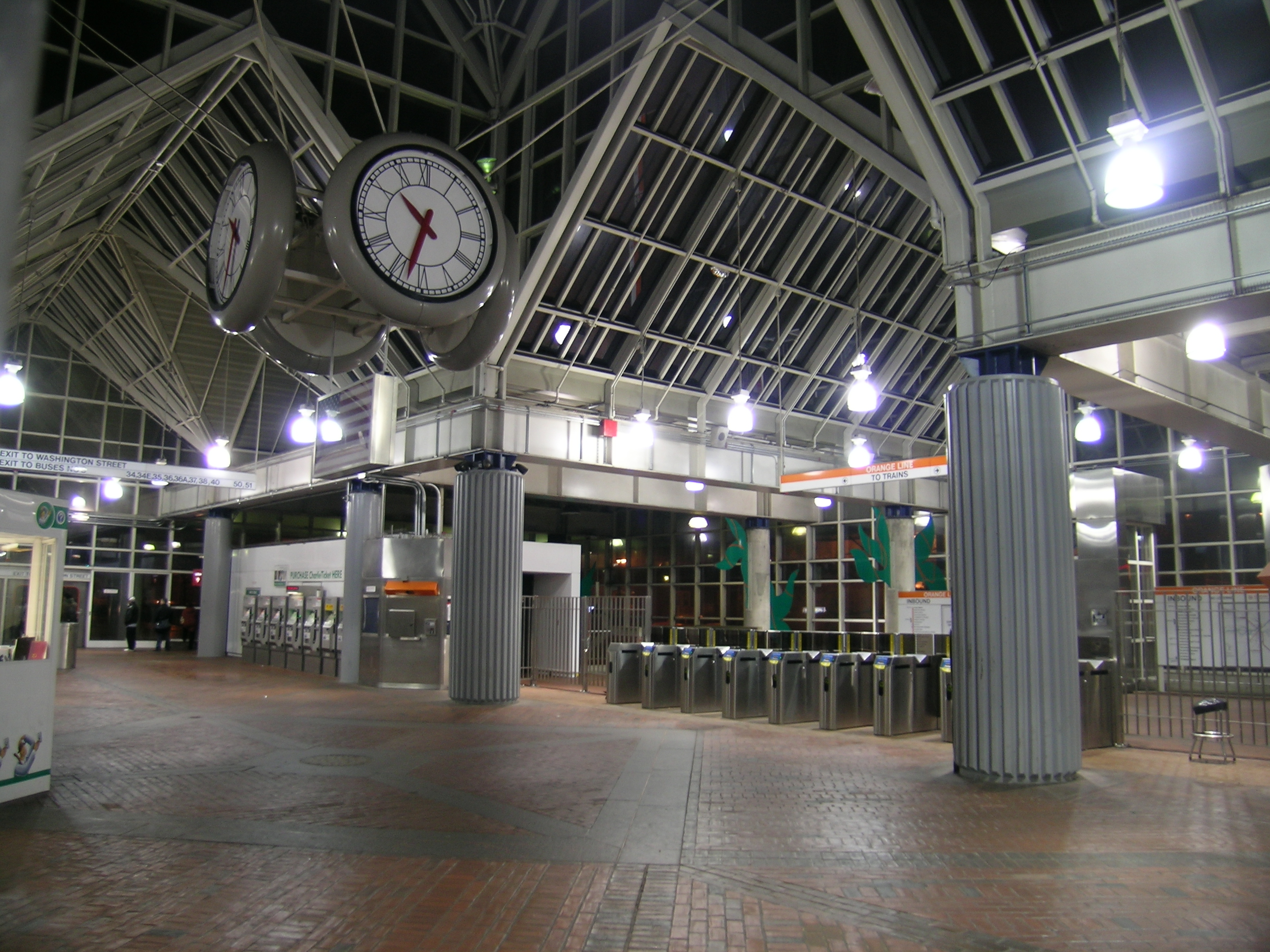
In the late 1980s, the Forest Hills Station shown here replaced the red brick structure built in the 1800s.

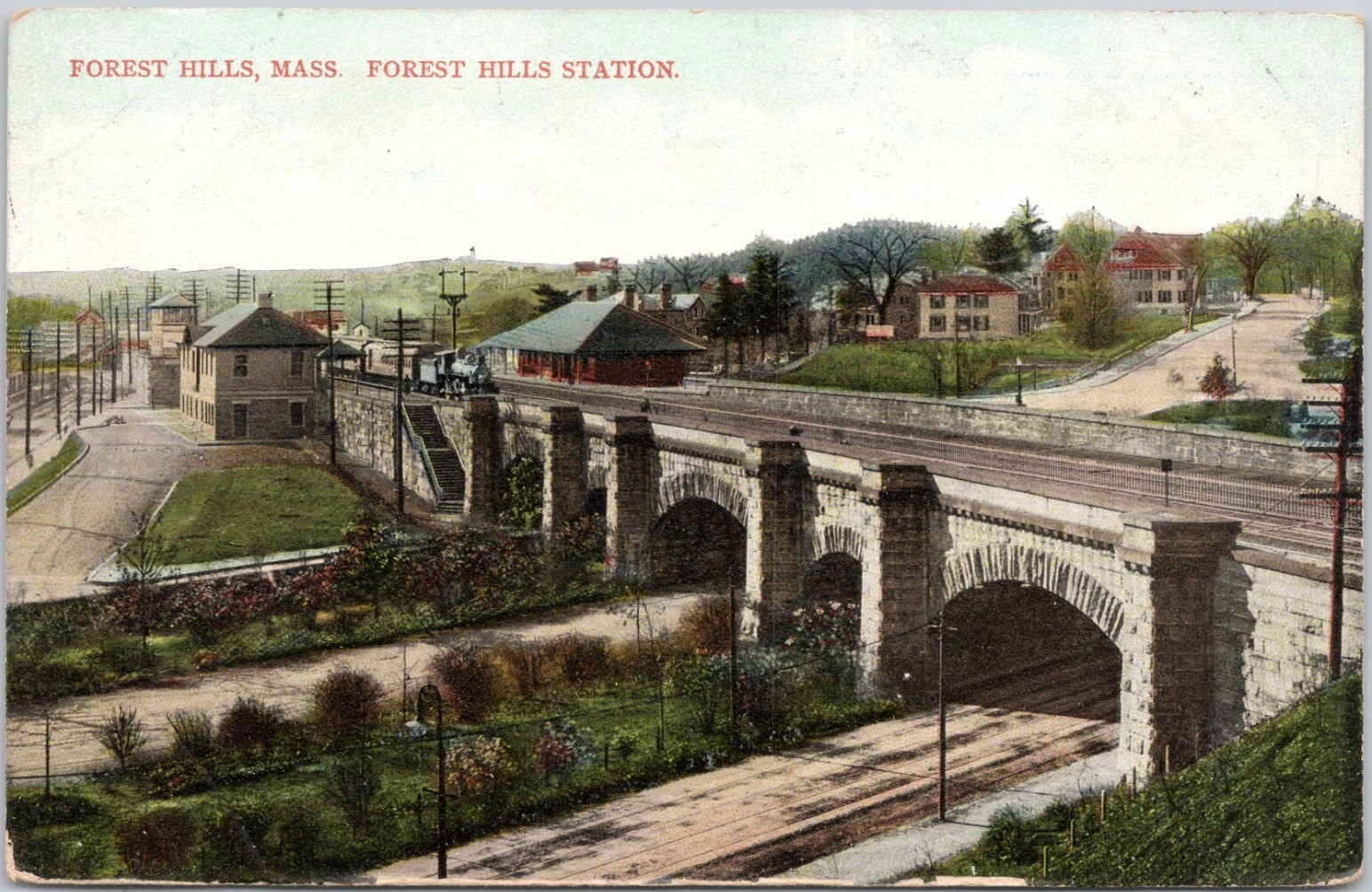
Forest Hills train bridge

In the early 1970s, the city of Boston planned to extend I-95 from Canton north into downtown Boston. This threatened to bring I-95 straight through the center of Jamaica Plain, essentially dividing the community in half if executed. Many protests along with support from residents of Jamaica Plain, Roxbury and Hyde Park, rallied to stop the construction of the highway, including a now-annual community festival, called "Wake Up The Earth", that mustered residents from surrounding neighborhoods in opposition to the highway. The project had already demolished hundreds of houses and commercial buildings in the highway's path before then-Governor Francis W. Sargent ordered to stop the interstate project. In the 1980s, the Southwest Corridor in its present form was built, creating a parkway, bike path, and site for future Wake Up The Earth festivals in lieu of the highway, now situated atop the underground Orange Line.

By 1970, central Jamaica Plain was considered to be in a state of decline. The construction of the proposed highway coupled with and possibly contributing to a decision by Boston banks to cut back mortgage lending (redline) there began a cycle of disinvestment which led to the deterioration of the housing stock, slumlording and abandonment particularly in the central neighborhood along the edges of the corridor. In some cases, homeowners who could not sell due to lack of buyer financing simply walked away from older homes along the corridor's periphery. Urban Edge, founded as a non-profit real estate firm in 1974, found it necessary to recruit volunteer tenants to physically take possession of empty properties to prevent vandalism and arson. Anecdotal evidence suggests that the average life span of an abandoned building was approximately one week. Windows were broken, copper plumbing was stripped out, and buildings were torched.

After conducting a research project that documented a dramatic decrease in mortgage lending between 1968 and 1972, activists launched the Jamaica Plain Community Investment Plan. The plan called upon local citizens to pledge to move their savings accounts to a local institution that would guarantee to invest that money in mortgages within Jamaica Plain. The plan eventually generated five hundred thousand dollars in pledges. In 1975 a contract was signed with the Jamaica Plain Cooperative Bank to implement the Community Investment plan.

In 1974, the community rallied and under the aegis of an Alinsky-style organizing project funded by The Ecumenical Social Action Committee (ESAC) a coalition of local churches contracted with an experienced Rhode Island–based community organizer, Richard W. "Rick" Wise, who built a series of neighborhood groups and a coalition of leaders into The Jamaica Plain Banking and Mortgage Committee and working with groups from other Boston neighborhoods, leveraged that into the citywide Boston Anti-Redlining Coalition (BARC), The coalition, chaired by long-time neighborhood activist Edwina "Winky" Cloherty, crafted a unique and ultimately successful campaign to force Boston Banks to reveal their lending patterns and a "Greenlining campaign" to both stimulate residential investment in the neighborhood. as well as to publicize and stop the redlining. In 2019, Richard Wise published a novel, Redlined, which outlines the essential elements of the anti-redlining campaign.

In October 1974, the committee was also successful in securing a pledge from gubernatorial candidate Michael Dukakis to require that state chartered banks disclose their lending patterns annually by ZIP code. Upon his election, ignoring threats of litigation by the banks, Dukakis kept his word. On May 16, 1975, the new Banking Commissioner Carol S. Greenwald issued the first statewide mortgage disclosure regulation in the U.S. Subsequent studies based on data obtained by the banking commissioner demonstrated that there was indeed a pattern of disinvestment in the central neighborhoods of Jamaica Plain. Later that year, The Jamaica Plain Banking & Mortgage Committee together with its citywide Boston Anti-Redlining Coalition (BARC) were part of a coalition, under the leadership of the Chicago-based National People's Action, instrumental in the passage of the Federal Home Mortgage Disclosure Act of 1975. According to former commissioner Greenwald: "Massachusetts success in getting the banks to reveal their lending policies was followed by similar actions in New York, California and Illinois."

In the following years, real estate prices stabilized, mortgage money became available and The Southwest Corridor Coalition a task force of local citizens broken down by neighborhoods and aided by state officials, put together a comprehensive master plan to redevelop the corridor. They decided to remove the elevated rapid transit train line on Washington Street and replace it with a below-grade line alongside the train tracks. With the new transit lines in place following the old train embankment, the Southwest Corridor park was built from Forest Hills north through the old Stony Brook valley.

Changes to the transit service through Jamaica Plain were followed with a change to the streetcar route as well. The Arborway line, which had been in service since 1903, had long been considered for replacement with bus service by the transportation authority. In 1977, trolley service on the Arborway line from downtown Boston was stopped at Heath Street, with buses continuing to Forest Hills. Service resumed, but were cut again in the 1980s, and has not been resumed since. This decision has been challenged by citizen groups in Jamaica Plain in the courts and is settled in favor of buses.

=== Urban renewal ===
In the 1980s low rents brought many students to the area, especially those who attended the Museum School, Mass Art, and Northeastern University, who often lived in collective households. The neighborhood also developed a lesbian and gay community. The presence of artists in the neighborhood led to the opening of local galleries and bookstores, and arts centers such as the Jamaica Plain Arts Center, which shared space in a vacated City of Boston Firehouse with Brueggers Bagel Company for several years. This site is currently the J.P. Licks ice cream store. Many first-time homebuyers were able to afford the house and condominium prices in Jamaica Plain during this time.

In the mid-1980s, an important music scene developed in Jamaica Plain that continues to the present day. Revitalization continued in the 1990s. Nonprofit housing groups bought rundown houses and vacant lots to create low-income rental units. During the same years, the former Plant Shoe Factory site was redeveloped as JP Plaza, a strip mall, and later a supermarket. A new facility for the Martha Eliot Health Center completed the site's redevelopment. As part of a citywide effort, Boston Main Streets districts were named (Hyde/Jackson Square, Egleston Square, and Centre/South), bringing city funds and tools of neighborhood revitalization to local business owners.

=== Demographics ===
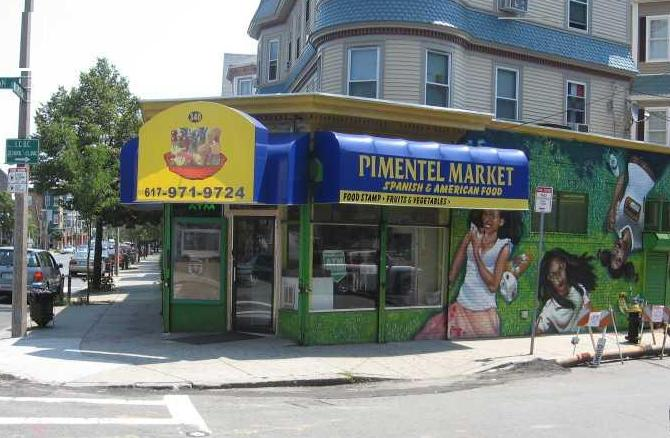
Latin-American market near Hyde Square

By the turn of the 21st century, the neighborhood had attracted a large community of college-educated professionals, political activists and artists. Examples of artist and activist organizations active or incorporated in Jamaica Plain include Grassroots International, Urbano Project, Jamaica Plain Neighborhood Development Corporation, Boston Postdoctoral Association, City Life/Vida Urbana, JP Progressives, and Bikes Not Bombs.

Hyde, Jackson, and Egleston Squares have significant Spanish-speaking populations mainly from the Dominican Republic, but also from Puerto Rico and Cuba. As of 2010 the ethnic make-up of Jamaica Plain was 53.6% White (alone), 22% Hispanic or Latino (all races), 13.5% Black or African-American (alone), 7.9% Asian (alone), 3% Other.

In 2016, the neighborhood between Jackson Square and Hyde Square was officially designated the "Latin Quarter" by the city of Boston, after years of informal recognition by residents, Latin activists, and local politicians. The area has a large number of Latin owned businesses and residents, and is the center of local festivals, churches, and activist groups, such as La Piñata, the ¡Viva! el Latin Quarter project of the Hyde Square Task Force, and nearby Vida Urbana. The newspaper El Mundo is based in Hyde Square.

The elimination of redlining and the stabilization of the real estate market in the late 1970s and the redevelopment of the Southwest Corridor set the stage for gentrification that began in the 1990s. A hot real estate market has driven dramatic increases in the value of older homes in the Parkside, Pondside and Sumner Hill neighborhoods and conversion of some larger residential properties and older commercial buildings into condominia. Numerous formerly vacant structures are being converted to residential use, among them the ABC Brewery, the Gormley Funeral Home, the Eblana Brewery, the Oliver Ditson Company, 319 Centre Street, Jackson Square, JP Cohousing, Blessed Sacrament, Our Lady of the Way, and 80 Bickford Street.

The oldest community theater group in the US, Footlight Club, is based out of Eliot Hall in this neighborhood, on Eliot Street.

== Geography ==
=== Sub-neighborhoods ===
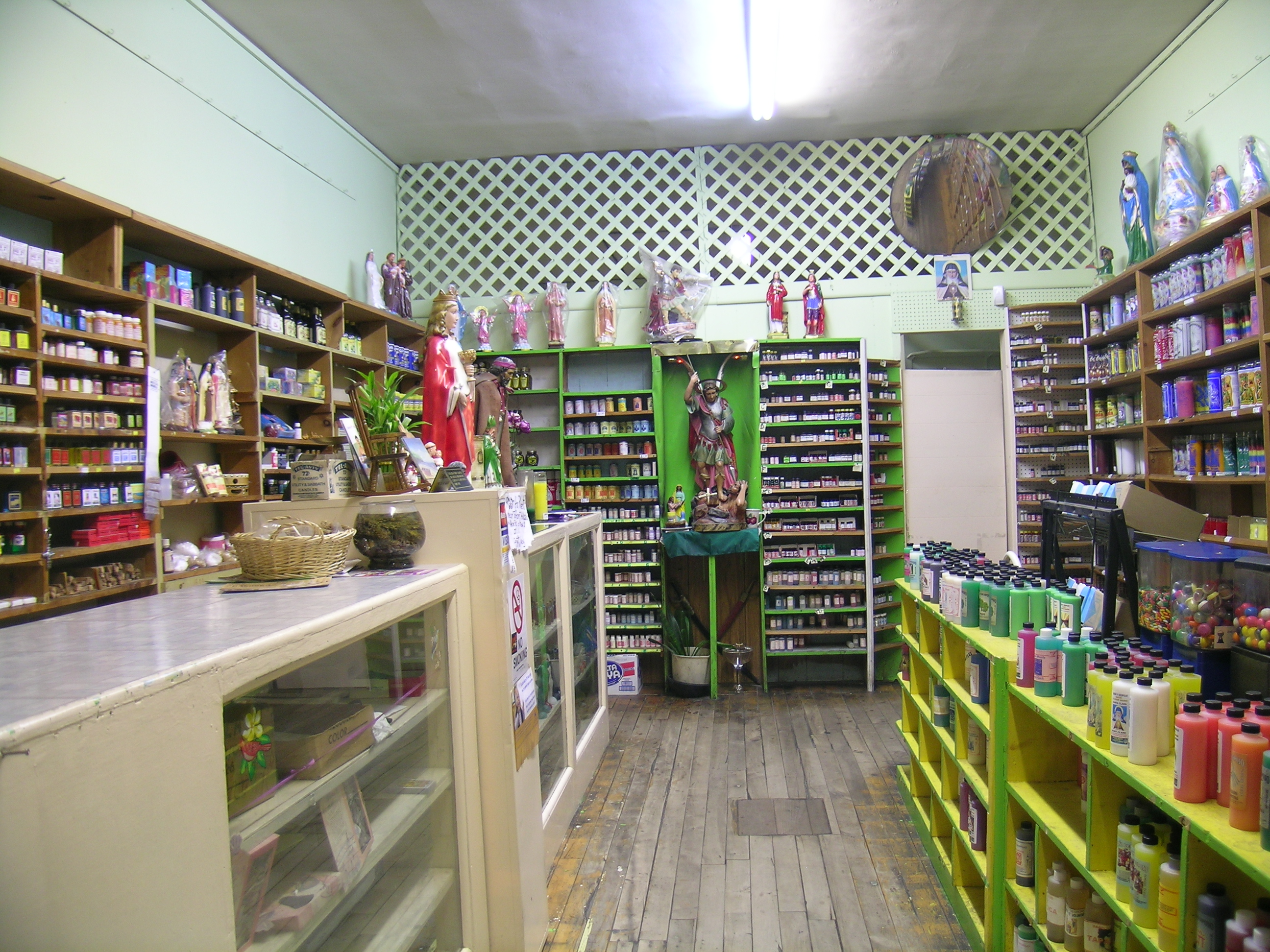
Jamaica Plain has several botánicas, such as this one on Centre Street, that cater to the Latino community and typically sell folk medicine alongside statues of saints, candles decorated with prayers, lucky bamboo, and other items.

Jamaica Plain includes several historically recognized sub-districts. Some of these names are less commonly used today but are still referenced in historical records and real estate contexts.

- Brookside: roughly bounded by Boylston Street, Green Street, Washington Street, and the Southwest Corridor Park
- Egleston Square: intersection of Columbus Avenue and Washington Street at the border between Jamaica Plain and Roxbury. Portions of School Street are part of Jamaica Plain though mail is delivered to 02119; whereas most addresses are in 02130
- Forest Hills: roughly bounded by the Arborway, Morton Street, Walk Hill Street, South Street and Forest Hills Cemetery
- Hyde Square: the area around the intersection of Centre Street, Day Street, and Perkins Street, extending east along Centre Street towards Roxbury
- Jackson Square: intersection of Columbus Avenue and Centre Street. Site of an MBTA Orange Line station
- Jamaica Hills: northwest of the Arnold Arboretum, including Moss Hill and Green Hill
- Parkside: roughly bounded by Washington Street, Egleston Square, Morton Street and Franklin Park
- Pondside: roughly bounded by Centre Street, Perkins Street, and the Jamaicaway
- South Street: follows the named street on either side from the Monument (on Centre Street) to Forest Hills
- Stonybrook: with an active neighborhood association, documented boundaries begin at Rockvale Circle southwest on Washington Street encompassing Burnett Street at McBride Street, cutting southeast across MBTA bus yard to Lotus Street, and northeast up Forest Hills Street back to Rockvale Circle.
- Sumner Hill: roughly bounded by Seaverns Avenue, Everett Street, Sedgwick Street, and Newbern Street
- Sunnyside: roughly bounded by Centre Street, Day Street, Round Hill Street, and Gay Head Street
- The Monument: Overlapping with Pondside above, the area around the intersection of Centre and South Streets
- Woodbourne: south of Forest Hills, bounded by Walk Hill Street, Goodway Street, and Wachusett Street
- White City: no longer recognized; its territory included part of Hyde Park Ave and certain blocks of which are now considered part of Woodbourne

=== Green spaces ===
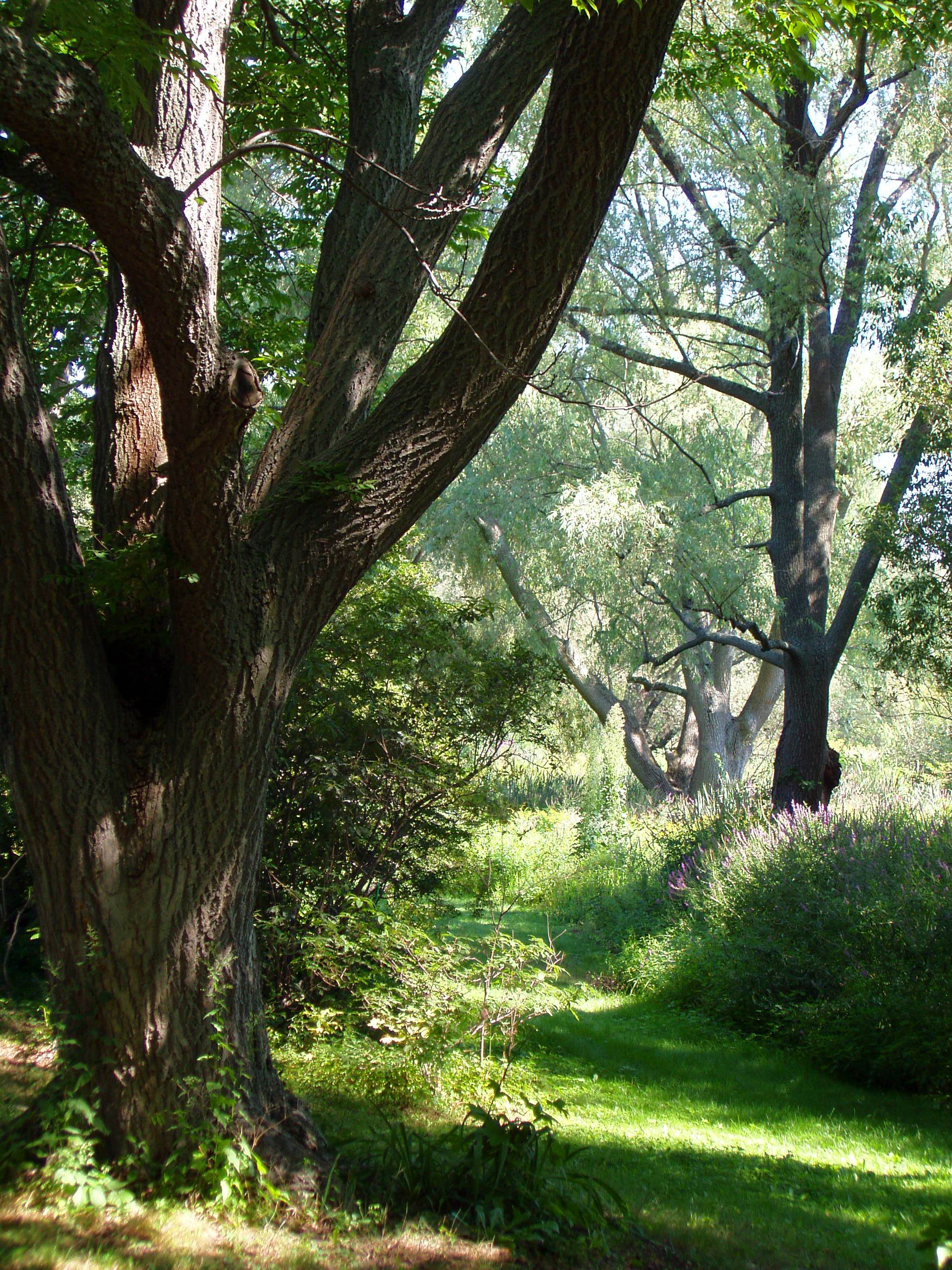
Arnold Arboretum

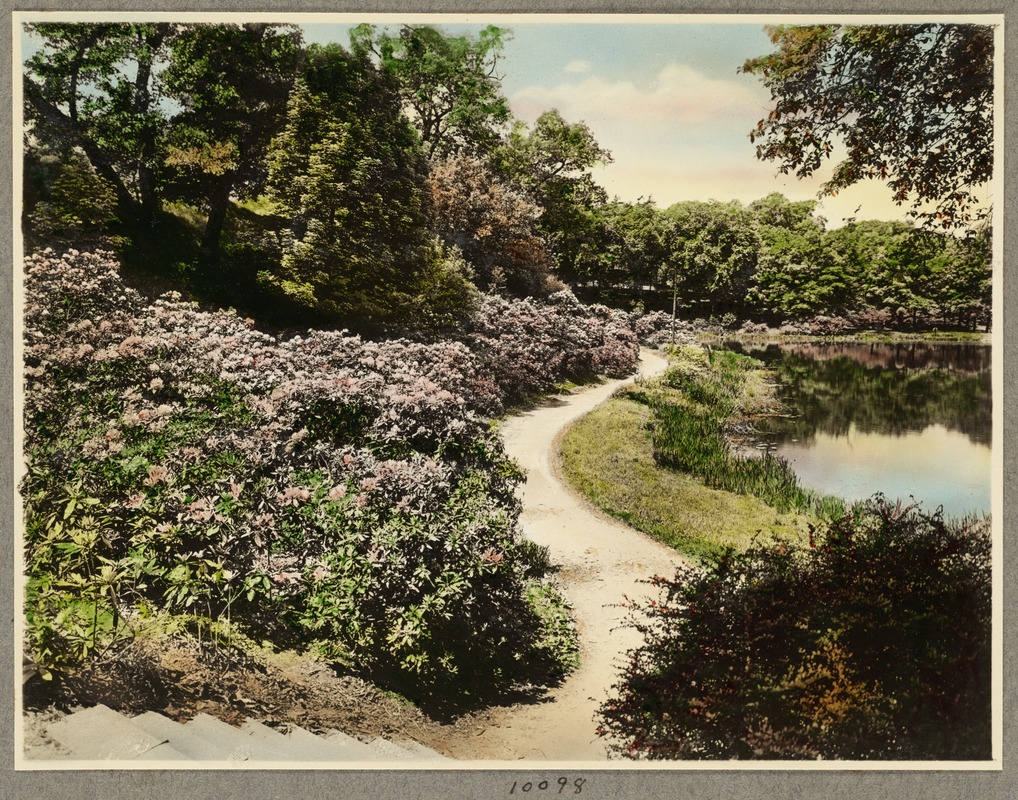
Ward's Pond, looking down from stairs, June 4, 1929; from the Leon Abdalian Collection of the Boston Public Library

Jamaica Plain, often referred to in the 19th century as "the Eden of America", is one of the greenest neighborhoods in the city of Boston. The community contains or is bordered by a number of jewels of the Emerald Necklace park system designed in the 19th century by Frederick Law Olmsted:

- Olmsted Park: from Route 9 at the Riverway south to Perkins Street, including Leverett Pond, Willow Pond, and Ward's Pond
- Jamaica Pond: has 60 acres (240,000 m^{2}) of surface area and is the largest and deepest body of fresh water in Boston
- Arnold Arboretum: is a 265-acre (1.1 km^{2}) world-renowned plant collection maintained by Harvard University, and contains Peters' Hill, named for Boston Mayor Andrew J. Peters, the highest elevation in Jamaica Plain at 235 feet (72 m)
- Franklin Park: is a 527-acre (2.1 km^{2}) park (the largest in the city) and holds the Franklin Park Zoo (the largest zoo in New England), White Stadium and the William J. Devine Memorial Golf Course

These parks are connected by parkways, each of which is also part of the Emerald Necklace. From south to north these are the Arborway, the Jamaicaway, and the Riverway.

The area also includes Forest Hills Cemetery, a 275-acre (1.1 km^{2}) "garden cemetery", and hundreds more acres of cemetery that stretch along Walk Hill Street offer more green space to the area.

=== Climate ===
The record high temperature was 103 °F (39 °C) which occurred on June 25, 2025, and July 22, 1977. The record high daily minimum is 79 °F (26 °C) which occurred on August 9, 2022. The warmest month is July 2024 with an average mean temperature of 77.8 °F (25.4 °C) for the month. The month with the record warmest average daily maximums was July 2022 with an average daily maximum of 89.2 °F (31.8 °C); and the month with the record warmest daily minimums was July 2013 with an average daily minimum of 68.6 °F (20.3 °C). July 2022 also saw an entire month without a daytime high reading below 79 °F (26 °C). July 2008 also set a record with the entire month without any temperature below 61 °F (16 °C) recorded. Summers in Jamaica Plain typically produces at least one 93 °F (34 °C) reading and a 70 °F (21 °C) daily minimum. The average yearly maximum daily minimum is 74.6 °F (23.7 °C).

Climate data for Jamaica Plain, Massachusetts (1991–2020 normals, extremes 1962–present)
| Month | Jan | Feb | Mar | Apr | May | Jun | Jul | Aug | Sep | Oct | Nov | Dec | Year |
|---|---|---|---|---|---|---|---|---|---|---|---|---|---|
| Record high °F (°C) | 72 (22) | 74 (23) | 89 (32) | 95 (35) | 99 (37) | 103 (39) | 103 (39) | 100 (38) | 101 (38) | 92 (33) | 83 (28) | 78 (26) | 103 (39) |
| Mean maximum °F (°C) | 57.2 (14.0) | 59.8 (15.4) | 68.6 (20.3) | 81.3 (27.4) | 89.9 (32.2) | 92.7 (33.7) | 96.3 (35.7) | 93.9 (34.4) | 89.8 (32.1) | 79.9 (26.6) | 70.7 (21.5) | 61.9 (16.6) | 97.5 (36.4) |
| Mean daily maximum °F (°C) | 37.0 (2.8) | 39.6 (4.2) | 46.6 (8.1) | 58.8 (14.9) | 69.4 (20.8) | 78.8 (26.0) | 84.7 (29.3) | 83.1 (28.4) | 75.5 (24.2) | 63.7 (17.6) | 52.6 (11.4) | 42.4 (5.8) | 61.0 (16.1) |
| Daily mean °F (°C) | 28.2 (−2.1) | 30.3 (−0.9) | 37.5 (3.1) | 48.5 (9.2) | 58.8 (14.9) | 68.4 (20.2) | 74.4 (23.6) | 72.8 (22.7) | 65.2 (18.4) | 53.3 (11.8) | 43.4 (6.3) | 34.0 (1.1) | 51.2 (10.7) |
| Mean daily minimum °F (°C) | 19.4 (−7.0) | 21.0 (−6.1) | 28.4 (−2.0) | 38.1 (3.4) | 48.2 (9.0) | 57.9 (14.4) | 64.0 (17.8) | 62.5 (16.9) | 54.9 (12.7) | 43.0 (6.1) | 34.2 (1.2) | 25.7 (−3.5) | 41.4 (5.2) |
| Mean minimum °F (°C) | 2.2 (−16.6) | 3.3 (−15.9) | 12.5 (−10.8) | 26.1 (−3.3) | 35.7 (2.1) | 45.3 (7.4) | 53.8 (12.1) | 52.0 (11.1) | 40.7 (4.8) | 29.5 (−1.4) | 20.1 (−6.6) | 11.1 (−11.6) | −0.6 (−18.1) |
| Record low °F (°C) | −10 (−23) | −11 (−24) | 0 (−18) | 16 (−9) | 24 (−4) | 38 (3) | 44 (7) | 37 (3) | 32 (0) | 20 (−7) | 6 (−14) | −10 (−23) | −11 (−24) |
| Average precipitation inches (mm) | 3.87 (98) | 3.59 (91) | 4.49 (114) | 4.32 (110) | 3.64 (92) | 4.18 (106) | 3.49 (89) | 3.72 (94) | 3.96 (101) | 5.03 (128) | 3.99 (101) | 5.08 (129) | 49.36 (1,253) |
Source 1: NOAA
Source 2: National Weather Service

== Culture and events ==
Jamaica Plain is known for its vibrant community life and active local culture, reflected in several popular public events held throughout the year.

Wake Up the Earth Festival, organized annually by Spontaneous Celebrations since 1979, is Jamaica Plain's vibrant May Day celebration that "wakes up" the neighborhood from its winter slumber and brings together its culturally diverse community. Founded in the wake of the halted I‑95 highway expansion, the festival originally served as a grassroots celebration of earthly renewal and neighborhood unity; it features parades, live music, performances, art-making workshops, banners, and eco‑conscious programming.

JP Porchfest is an annual community arts festival in Jamaica Plain that began in 2014. Local porches and public spaces become stages for music, dance, and theater performances.

== Education ==
=== Primary and secondary schools ===
Students in Jamaica Plain are served by Boston Public Schools (BPS). BPS assigns students based on preferences of the applicants and priorities of students in various zones. The English High School located in Jamaica Plain is one of the first public high schools in America.

In 2009, the last Catholic school in Jamaica Plain, Our Lady of Lourdes, closed due to low enrollment and funding issues.

Private schools in the area include the British School of Boston and Showa Boston Institute for Language and Culture.

== Transportation ==
Jamaica Plain is served by the Massachusetts Bay Transportation Authority (MBTA)'s bus and rail services.

Major roads are Centre Street, the Jamaicaway (formerly US 1), the Arborway (MA 203), Washington Street, South Street, and South Huntington Avenue.

=== Public transportation ===
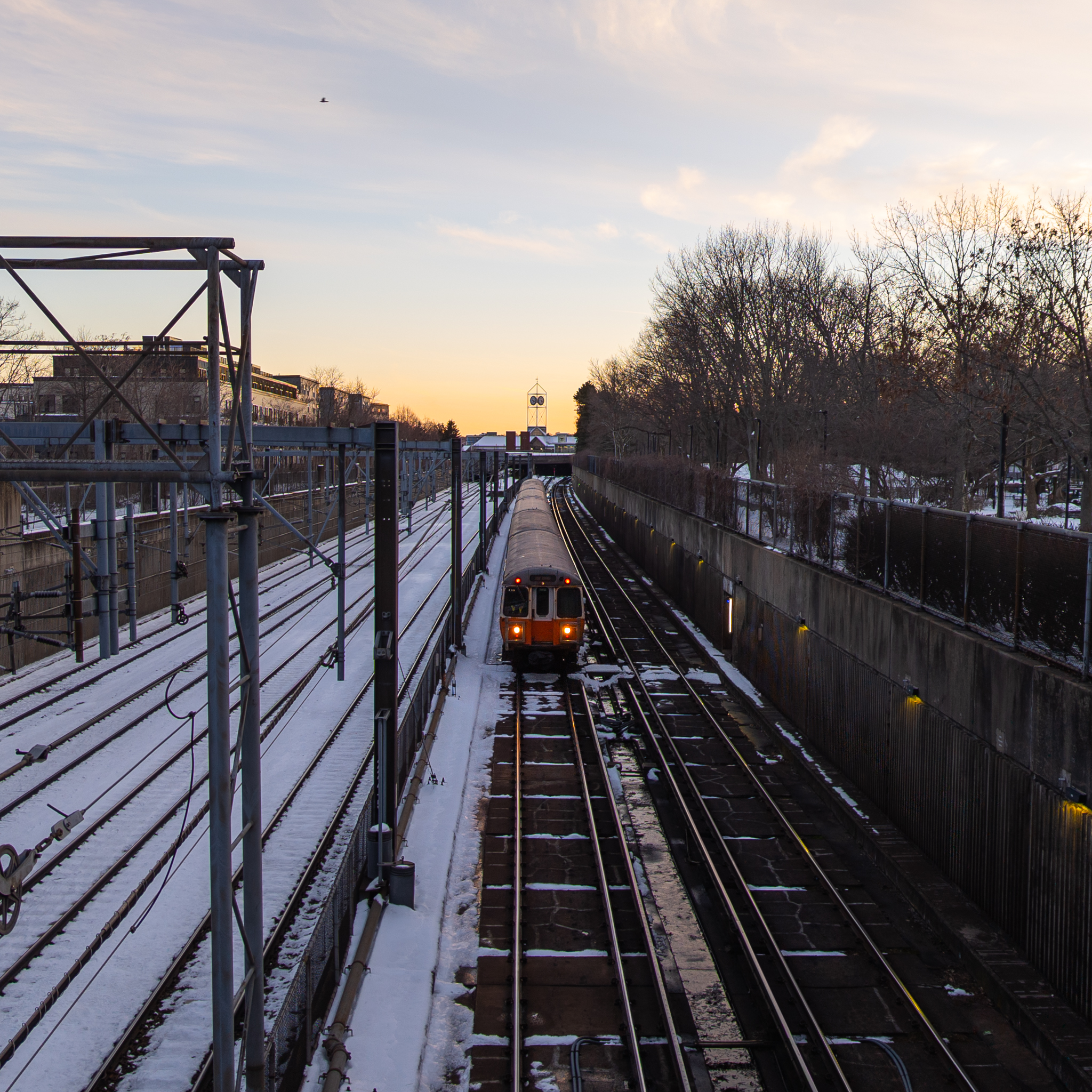
Orange Line train in the Southwest Corridor in Jamaica Plain

The Green Line's E branch streetcar service terminates at Heath Street and South Huntington Avenue. Bus service continues along South Huntington Avenue, Centre Street, and South Street to its terminus at the Forest Hills Station. The E branch originally continued through Jamaica Plain to its terminus at Arborway station, adjacent to Forest Hills Station. The Orange Line rapid transit line of the MBTA subway runs below street level through the middle of Jamaica Plain, with stops at Jackson Square, Stony Brook, Green Street, and Forest Hills. Buses connect Jamaica Plain with Roslindale, West Roxbury, Hyde Park, and suburban Dedham, Westwood and Walpole to the south, and the rest of Boston by street routes. The 39 bus is the primary Jamaica Plain bus route, and is one of Boston's most-used bus lines. The Forest Hills Station is a major transportation hub and is within walking distance of the Arnold Arboretum and Forest Hills Cemetery.

The E branch was "temporarily" suspended from Heath Street to Forest Hills in the mid-1980s, but proposals to restore the service have caused considerable tension in the area. Some residents and commuters want the restoration of the branch, which is seen as a reconnection with the rest of the city. However, others state that the #39 bus along the old route, and the Orange Line just a few blocks away, duplicate the extension.

=== Commuter rail ===
The Needham Line of the MBTA Commuter Rail system stops at Forest Hills Station.

=== Cars and parking ===
Municipal parking lots are located off Centre Street at Burroughs Street in Jamaica Plain Center, across from the Mary Curley School on Centre Street at Spring Park Ave., and across from Blessed Sacrament Church in Hyde Square. There are few parking meters in Jamaica Plain; on-street parking is free. Many streets near the MBTA Orange Line stations are posted "resident permit only" during working hours (8 AM to 6 PM). This is intended to discourage commuters from using residential streets as parking lots during the day.

=== Bicycle paths ===
Two major bicycle paths serve Jamaica Plain. Along the Southwest Corridor Park is the Pierre Lallement Bicycle Path, which runs from Forest Hills to Back Bay. To the west are bicycle paths, which run through the parks of the Emerald Necklace, along the Jamaicaway and Riverway.

== Notable people ==
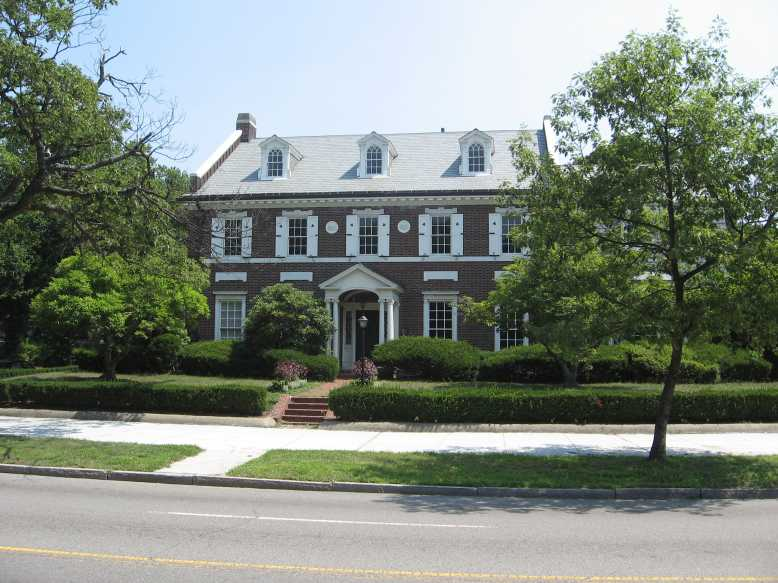
Home of former Boston mayor James Michael Curley on the Jamaicaway

- Robert Bacon (1860–1919), United States Secretary of State
- Emily Greene Balch (1867–1961), Nobel Peace Prize winner, founder of Women's International League for Peace and Freedom
- Baruj Benacerraf (1920–2011), immunologist, Nobel Prizewinner, died in Jamaica Plain
- Henry Pickering Bowditch (1840–1911), physiologist, died in Jamaica Plain
- Harold Hitz Burton (1888–1964), Mayor of Cleveland, U.S. Senator of Ohio and Supreme Court Justice
- John F. Collins (1919–1995), Mayor of Boston
- James Michael Curley (1874–1958), Mayor of Boston, Governor of Massachusetts, and U.S. Representative
- James Dole (1877–1958), American industrialist of the Hawaiian pineapple industry, founder of present-day Dole Food Company
- George Dorr (1853–1944), preservationist and co-founder of today's Acadia National Park
- Walter Faxon (1848–1920), ornithologist and carcinologist; curator at the Museum of Comparative Zoology
- Ruby Foo (1904–1950), restaurateur
- William Heath (1737–1814), farmer, political leader, Continental Army Major General
- Michelle Johnson, journalist
- Joshua Loring (1716–1781), British Naval officer, Loyalist
- Joey McIntyre (born 1972) Entertainer, Member of Pop Act New Kids On The Block
- Malcolm Nichols (1876–1951), last Republican Mayor of Boston to date
- Francis Parkman (1823–1892), historian
- Andrew James Peters (1872–1938), State Representative, Mayor of Boston during the Boston Police Strike
- Sylvia Plath (1932–1963), poet, novelist, and short-story writer
- Gary Provost (1944–1995), writer
- Joe Rogan (born 1967), comedian, podcaster
- Greg Selkoe (born 1975), Entrepreneur
- Jeremy Strong (born 1978), actor, lived in Jamaica Plain in childhood.
- Richard Francis Sullivan (1937–2024), Hall of Fame Wrestler
- Maurice Joseph Tobin (1901–1953), Mayor of Boston, Governor of Massachusetts, United States Secretary of Labor
- William F. Wharton (1847–1919), U.S. Assistant Secretary of State
