= Gary Provost =

American writer and writing instructor (1944-1995)

Gary R. Provost
- Born: November 14, 1944; Boston, Massachusetts, US
- Died: May 10, 1995 (aged 50)
- Occupations: Writer, teacher
- Years active: 1982-1995
- Style: How-To texts for writers True-Crime YA novels Satire Mystery Celebrity Biography Business Sports Romance Cooking
- Spouse: Gail Provost
- Awards: Skipping Stones Book Award, National Jewish Book Award
- Website: https://www.garyprovost.com/

Gary Provost (November 14, 1944 – May 10, 1995) was an American writer and writing instructor, author of works including Make every word count: a guide to writing that works—for fiction and nonfiction (1980) and 100 Ways to Improve Your Writing: Proven Professional Techniques for Writing with Style and Power (1985). He was married to Gail Provost, and together they wrote 3 books.

== Life and career ==
Provost was born in Boston and grew up in Jamaica Plain, Massachusetts. He was the youngest of 9 children, with his other siblings being "scattered about the state in various foster homes or reform schools" Upon leaving school in 1962, Provost hitchhiked across the United States.

In addition to writing books, Provost also wrote columns and celebrity profiles. Additionally, he was a teacher and a writing coach, starting a weekly seminar with his wife Gail. He also spoke at numerous writing conferences throughout the nation. A children's book that Provost wrote with his wife, Gail, titled David and Max, won the 2007 Skipping Stones Honor Award.

One of his most well-known quotes is based on a writing tip he gave, "vary sentence length". The quote, which is often referred to as "Write Music", is:

This sentence has five words. Here are five more words. Five word sentences are fine. But several together become monotonous. Listen to what is happening. The writing is getting boring. The sound of it drones. It's like a stuck record. The ear demands some variety.

Now listen. I vary the sentence length, and I create music. Music. The writing sings. It has a pleasant rhythm, a lilt, a harmony. I use short sentences. And I use sentences of medium length. And sometimes when I am certain the reader is rested, I will engage him with a sentence of considerable length, a sentence that burns with energy and builds with all the impetus of a crescendo, the roll of the drums, the crash of the cymbals—sounds that say listen to this, it is important.

So write with a combination of short, medium, and long sentences. Create a sound that pleases the reader's ear. Don't just write words. Write music.

Provost died on May 10, 1995. His death was sudden, and it interrupted his then-ongoing projects, including a book about Humphrey Bogart. Some of his unfinished work has been published posthumously, including "Baffled In Boston" published in 2001, and "The Dorchester Gas Tank" published in 2016.

== Bibliography ==
=== Writing instructions ===
- The Freelance Writer's Handbook (1982) ISBN 0451621247
- 100 Ways To Improve Your Writing (1985) ISBN 1984803689
- Beyond Style: Mastering the Finer Points of Writing (1988) ISBN 1311433767
- Make Every Word Count (1990) ISBN 1948929295
- How to Write and Sell True Crime (1991) ISBN 0898794463
- Make Your Words Work (1991) ISBN 0463770226
- How to Tell a Story: The Secrets of Writing Captivating Tales (1998) (with Peter Rubie) ISBN 1947187090
- "Just Say No" published in The Writer's Digest Handbook of Novel Writing (1992)

=== True crime ===
- Fatal Dosage: The True Story of a Nurse on Trial for Murder (1985) ISBN 0553249533
- Finder: The True Story of a Private Investigator (1988) (with Marilyn Greene) ISBN 1310501920
- Across The Border: The True Story of the Satanic Cult Killings in Matamoros, Mexico (1989) ISBN 0671693190
- Without Mercy: Obsession and Murder Under The Influence (1990) ISBN 137077771X
- Perfect Husband: The True Story of the Trusting Bride Who Discovered Her Husband Was a Coldblooded Killer (1992) ISBN 0671724932
- Into Their Own Hands (1994) ISBN 0553561170

=== Biography ===
- Finder: The True Story of a Private Investigator (1988, with Marilyn Greene) ISBN 1310501920
- High Stakes: Inside the New Las Vegas (1994) ISBN 1370398697
- Bogart: In Search of My Father (1995, by Stephen Bogart) ISBN 1611874955

=== Mystery ===
- Baffled In Boston (2001) (Published posthumously) ISBN 1311687254

=== Satire ===
- The Dorchester Gas Tank (2016) (Published posthumously) ISBN 1370302509

=== Romance ===
- Share The Dream (1983)

=== Pre-teen novel ===
- The Pork Chop War (1982) ISBN 0463035356
- Good If It Goes (1984, with Gail Provost Stockwell). winner of the 1985 National Jewish Book Award for Children's Literature. ISBN 0425084299
- Popcorn (1985, with Gail Provost Stockwell) ISBN 131144307X
- David and Max (1988, with Gail Provost Stockwell). Winner of the 2007 Skipping Stones Book Award. ISBN 0827611765
