= Richard Francis Sullivan =

American physician-scientist athlete (1937–2024)

- Born: July 14, 1937; West Roxbury, Massachusetts, U.S.
- Died: August 3, 2024 (aged 87); Cambridge, Massachusetts, U.S.
- Other names: Rick Sullivan
- Occupations: Physician, academic

Richard Francis Sullivan (July 14, 1937 – August 3, 2024) was an American physician-scientist and athlete. Sullivan is one of the original founders of the Massachusetts Chapter of the National Wrestling Hall of Fame.

== Early life and education ==
Sullivan was born on July 14, 1937, in West Roxbury, Boston, Massachusetts. He received his B.S. and Ph.D. degrees from Harvard University and his M.D. degree from Tufts University School of Medicine. His doctoral research under the mentorship of Nobel laureate Robert Burns Woodward involved the synthesis of the antibiotic tetracycline.

== Civil Rights Work ==
In 1974 after his applications to medical school were rejected on the basis of age, he filed a complaint with the Massachusetts Commission Against Discrimination against Tufts University School of Medicine citing a 1972 state law that forbid discrimination against a person on the basis of age for admission to a program leading to a degree beyond a bachelor's. In 1975 the commission found in Sullivan's favor and he was admitted at age 37 to Tufts University School of Medicine under court order, the first in history for reasons other than race.

== Wrestling career ==
Sullivan wrestled heavy weight while attending Harvard. After graduating he continued competition in amateur wrestling. He placed 6th in the 1964 US Olympic Trials. He was an AAU New England Champion for 18 years. He coached wrestling at both the University of Pennsylvania and Harvard University. Sullivan is one of the original founders of the Massachusetts Chapter of the National Wrestling Hall of Fame where he served as President for four years. The Richard Sullivan Award is awarded annually to a Harvard wrestler.

== Death ==
Sullivan died on August 3, 2024, at the age of 87.

== Awards ==
In 2008 he was inducted into the National Wrestling Hall of Fame, Massachusetts Chapter, as Outstanding American.
