= Forest Hills, Boston =

Neighborhood in Boston, Massachusetts

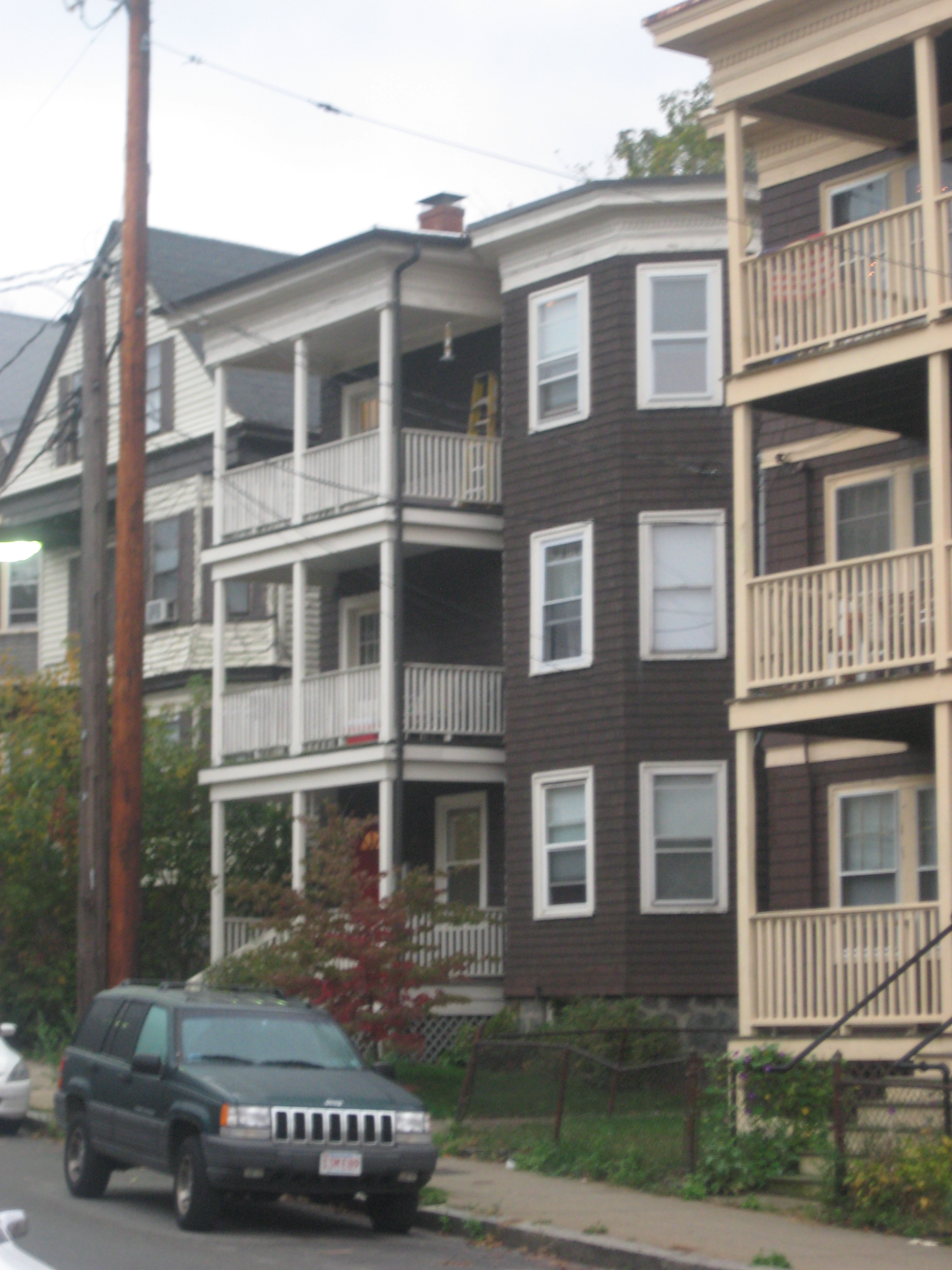
Triple deckers on Weld Hill Street near Forest Hills MBTA station

Forest Hills is a part of the Jamaica Plain neighborhood of Boston, Massachusetts, United States. Forest Hills is characterized by hilly terrain and wooded areas within and adjacent to its borders. In general, the area slopes upward from Hyde Park Ave and downward from Walk Hill Street.

Forest Hills is primarily residential, although a number of small businesses are located along Hyde Park Avenue. Single family homes predominate south of Walk Hill Street, but triple deckers dominate near the train station. As in the rest of Jamaica Plain, many of the multi-unit houses have been converted into condominiums. A variety of home styles are represented including Arts & Crafts, Cape Cod, Colonial Revival, Queen Anne, Tudor Revival and Victorian. South of Walk Hill Street, Forest Hills is characterized by curving, tree-lined streets laid out in irregular patterns indicative of how the area was thoughtfully transformed from country estates into a streetcar suburb.

== History ==
The first European known to have settled in Forest Hills was Capt. Joseph Weld (ancestor of former Governor of Massachusetts William Weld), the youngest of three immigrant brothers from England and a veteran of the Pequot War of 1637. For his efforts in that conflict and subsequent negotiations, the leaders of Massachusetts Bay Colony awarded him 278 acres (1.1 km^{2}) untamed in what is now the Forest Hills area of Jamaica Plain.

His descendant Col. Eleazer Weld, one of seven Weld family members who fought in the American Revolutionary War, bequeathed some of his land to fellow patriot Benjamin Bussey. His combined area was subsequently willed to Harvard University and become the basis for Arnold Arboretum.

In 1845, the Welds sold a large piece of land that would later become the Woodbourne area to William Minot, a fellow Yankee farmer. As the New England economy shifted from an agricultural base to a mercantile base, the Welds divided their land into smaller parcels for elite Bostonian friends and relatives. Some lived here year round; for others it was a rural retreat from Boston's summer heat and seasonal cholera outbreaks.

The Weld family and families to whom they were connected—especially Guild, Minot, Perkins, Olney, Peters and Rodman—were associated with Jamaica Plain for generations. A number of local statesmen were drawn from these families, and many of them became wealthy or famous.

Richard Olney built what might be the first tennis court in Boston on what is now Patten Street. George Minot won a Nobel Prize. William Fletcher Weld (whose mother was a Minot) left behind a $20 million dollar fortune. Stephen Minot Weld Jr. and George H. Perkins were Civil War heroes. Andrew James Peters (who married a Minot), became Mayor of Boston. A previous incarnation of Perkins School for the Blind stood atop Wachusett Street.

In the early 20th century, the arrival of public transportation brought increasing numbers of working-class people and rich Yankee families abandoned Forest Hills. Some returned to ancestral haunts on Beacon Hill or in Brookline. Others went farther south to Dedham or Westwood or even left the state entirely.

== Geographic locale ==
=== Borders ===
Forest Hills is not an officially designated area of the city nor have its borders been defined. Generally, "Forest Hills" refers to the area immediately surrounding the train station, plus the residential areas on the East side of Hyde Park Avenue extending perhaps as far as Cummins Highway or perhaps only as far as Walk Hill Street.

More often, Forest Hills refers to a roughly triangular area lying between Hyde Park Avenue, American Legion Highway and Morton Street, except for those areas separated from the rest by the cemeteries.

This triangle is bisected by Walk Hill Street. The blocks south of Walk Hill Street were once regarded as the White City area of Jamaica Plain. Now they are regarded as the Woodbourne area.

=== Subsections ===
==== White City ====
In 1914, four apartment buildings covered with light stucco were erected on Hyde Park Ave far South of the train station. The complex was called "White City" in emulation of the World's Columbian Exposition two decades earlier. The name was later borrowed by the White City Food Store and the White City Cleansers (sic) on the corner of Hyde Park Ave and Eldridge Road, thus putting the "White City" name on two large signs visible even to those whizzing by on Hyde Park Ave. White City came to be regarded as a section of Forest Hills, but not a separate section of Jamaica Plain. Its borders were seen as Walk Hill Street, Hyde Park Ave and St. Michael's Cemetery. The area now thought of as "Woodbourne" was contained within.

White City was not an all-White area of Jamaica Plain. Jamaica Plain was always a diverse section of the City of Boston, as was made obvious by the diversity of Jamaica Plain High School, the most integrated school in the City of Boston in the late 1950s. White City Cleansers was renamed around 2003; its sign was the last prominent reminder of the name that was once given to this section of Jamaica Plain. Racists had tried to link the name, White City, associated with the white stucco apartment buildings, with race. However, white was simply the color of the stucco applied to two buildings on Hyde Park Ave.

==== Woodbourne ====
- Woodbourne Historic District
- U.S. National Register of Historic Places
- U.S. Historic district
- Location within Massachusetts Location within the United States
- Location: Roughly bounded by Walk Hill, Goodway, and Wachusett Sts., Boston, Massachusetts
- Coordinates: 42°17′30″N 71°6′58″W
- Built: 1911
- Architect: multiple
- Architectural style: Queen Anne, Shingle Style, et al.
- NRHP reference No.: 99000593
- Added to NRHP: June 04, 1999

The Woodbourne Historic District is a historic residential subdivision in Forest Hills. It consists of a 30-acre (12 ha) parcel of land southwest of Forest Hills Cemetery, roughly bounded by Walk Hill Street, Goodway Road, and Wachusett Street. This area was developed into house lots between 1890 and 1933 by financier Robert Winsor in an effort to create a sort of utopian community for middle-class families. Frederick Law Olmsted Jr. was responsible for some of its layout.

The "bourne" element in streets such as Southbourne and Bournedale is taken from Bourne Street, a road established around 1820. Bourne Street begins at Walk Hill Street across from Forest Hills Cemetery, meanders through a scenic residential area and St. Michael's cemetery, then comes to an end at Canterbury Street and Mt. Hope Cemetery. The most distinctive homes in this section are designed to resemble gabled English cottages and are situated around a common courtyard. While the means to flatten out this terrain was readily available, developers chose to retain the uneven character of the landscape to preserve a country-like estate feel.

Since Woodbourne was designated as a historic district in 1999, homeowners and realtors have begun advertising homes there as belonging to the "Woodbourne area" rather than saying that they are in "Forest Hills". Nevertheless, Woodbourne was designed and advertised with the proximity of the train station in mind, was an integral part of the Roman Catholic parish of St. Andrew the Apostle, and was thought of as part of Forest Hills by its residents throughout the 20th century.

== Parks, cemeteries, and green space ==
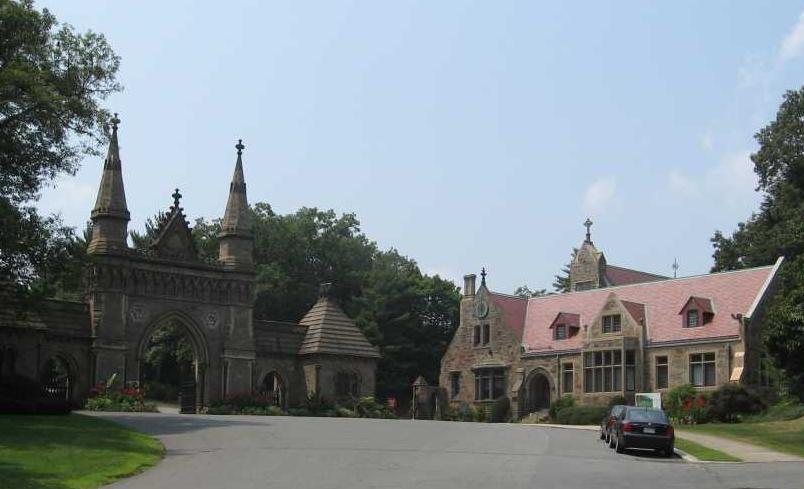
Entrance to Forest Hills Cemetery

Forest Hills is surrounded by the three final "links" of the Emerald Necklace park system designed by Frederick Law Olmsted in the 19th century: Arnold Arboretum, Arborway and Franklin Park. While teaching on "Schoolmaster's Hill" in Franklin Park, Ralph Waldo Emerson boarded on Morton Street near present-day Forest Hills Station in the same house used by feminist Margaret Fuller.

There is a baseball field at the top of Wachusett Street which is bordered by trees and adjacent to the well-maintained Parkman Playground. There are also small, nameless patches of woodland, such as the one between Patten Street and Eldridge Road.

Rock outcroppings of Roxbury puddingstone decorate the landscape, both within the green areas and in unexpected locations, such as the immense lump of puddingstone on Wachusett Street across from the Parkman School.

A large portion of Forest Hills is occupied by Forest Hills Cemetery, an active cemetery, also enjoyed as a 275-acre (1.1 km^{2}) park and arboretum, recognized as one of the finest 19th-century rural cemeteries in the country and listed on the National Register of Historic Places. Eugene O'Neill, e.e. cummings and William Lloyd Garrison are among the famous people buried here. St. Michael's Cemetery & Crematory (across Walk Hill Street from the Forest Hills Cemetery) is more contemporary in design. Calvary Cemetery, Mt. Hope Cemetery and New Calvary Cemetery are also large in size and are more contemporary (for example, level and sparsely wooded) burial grounds that lie on the opposite side of American Legion Highway. Together these cemeteries form a "dead area" that separates Forest Hills from the nearest sections of Mattapan and Roxbury.

== Education ==
=== Parkman School ===
In 1896, the City of Boston acquired an acre of land from Andrew James Peters for a school designed by Charles B. Perkins to be placed at the corner of Wachusett Street and Walk Hill Street. The school was named after Francis Parkman, local scholar whose summer home overlooked Jamaica Pond.

Francis Parkman School has housed two city educational programs: the Barton Assessment Center and The Young Achievers School, a city-wide pilot school dedicated to science and mathematics. The later program also occupies space in the Upham Church and school officials are considering expansion into one or more of the properties that comprise St. Andrew's. In September 2009 the Young Achievers School moved out of the building to a new home in Mattapan and the new Boston Teachers Union (BTU) Pilot school moved into the building.

=== Seaver School ===
On the late 1920s, the City of Boston acquired land for a school to be built between Eldridge Road and Northbourne. The city leveled the parcel and built a huge concrete retaining wall in the rear. The red brick building was designed with a Georgian Revival style by John F. Cullen and completed in 1930. Side wings were added the following year.

The school was eventually named after Edwin P. Seaver, Superintendent of Schools in Boston from 1880 to 1904. For much of the 20th century, this school provided education for grades K-8. Many local children attended kindergarten here, even those who would later attend St. Andrew's School from 1st grade and beyond.

The Edwin P. Seaver building was sold by the city and turned into condominiums in 1983 by the Finch/Abbey Group and is now one of the largest residential buildings in Forest Hills. The former schoolyards serve as parking for residents.

== Churches ==
=== Former St. Andrew's Parish (now Bethel AME Church) ===
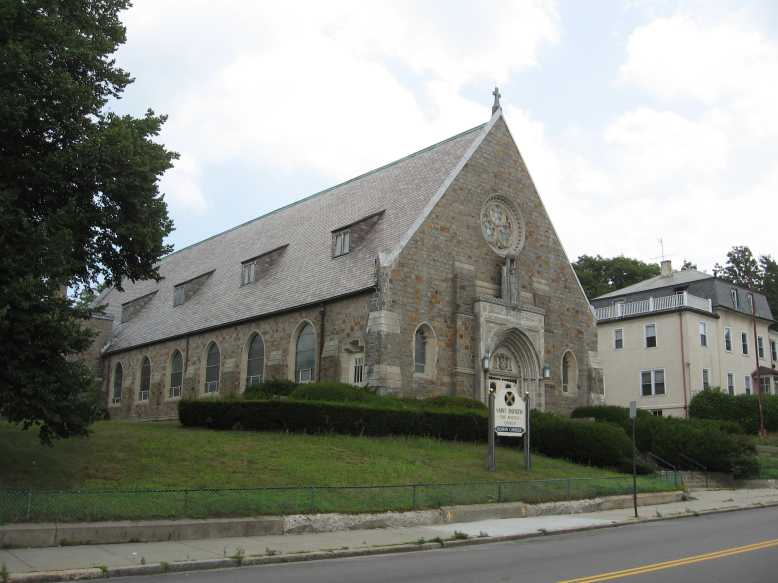
Former St Andrew's Church, now Bethel AME Church

St. Andrew the Apostle Church was built by the Archdiocese of Boston in 1918. It stands on the corner of Walk Hill Street and Wachusett Street diagonally across from where the city built the Parkman School some two decades earlier.

In 1942, St. Andrew the Apostle School was opened adjacent to the church. A convent next to the school housed the Sisters who staffed it. First it was staffed by the Sisters of the Congregation of Saint Joseph and later by the Sisters of Charity. A rectory next to the church was home to four or more priests at a time. Eventually, a building directly across the street from St. Andrew's Church was purchased to serve as a "community hall." By the late 1940s, Forest Hills (on both sides of Walk Hill Street) was predominantly Irish Catholic. Catholics of other ethnic groups (particularly Italians but also French, Poles, Portuguese, Scots and others) were also present but were collectively outnumbered by the Irish. Although small numbers of non-Catholics remained in the area, for the second half of the 20th century, "Forest Hills" and "St. Andrew's Parish" were virtually synonymous.

The 1970s busing crisis that erupted with violence in Boston neighborhoods such as Dorchester and South Boston had less visible effect in Jamaica Plain parishes such as St. Andrew's or its neighboring parent church St. Thomas Aquinas near Jamaica Plain Centre. Most White families in Jamaica Plain could afford to send their children to parochial schools, and did. During this time in which Forest Hills was mostly Irish-Catholic, two public schools operated within its borders: the Parkman and the Seaver. Students at these schools were mostly Black and Latino, reflecting the composition of Jamaica Plain as a whole. They travelled back and forth in yellow school buses and there was little interaction between these schools and the all-White residents of the area.

A thriving parish for much of the 20th century, St. Andrew's suffered a change at the end of the century. The surrounding area became increasingly heterogeneous, ethnically and culturally. Some locals resisted these changes and left the area in the process sometimes called "urban flight", further reducing the number of active parishioners. Another strong factor in the decline of attendance and revenue at St. Andrew's was dissatisfaction with the archdiocese in the wake of the Church sex scandal which came to light at this time. Forest Hills parishioners had particular cause to feel betrayed. John J. Geoghan, one of the most notorious molesters among Catholic clergy, served at St. Andrew's from 1974 to 1980 and ran the altar boy program. Patrick McSorley, one of Geoghan's most visible accusers, was from this parish.

St. Andrew's Church closed in 2000, although funeral masses were held there after that date. St. Andrew's School closed at the end of school year 2005. Students who had not yet graduated were given the option to attend Sacred Heart School in Roslindale.

In 2008, St. Andrews church, school, rectory, and convent were purchased by the Bethel African Methodist Church, a 20-year-old church and longtime owner and occupant of the Parkside Christian School building on nearby Forest Hills Street. In August 2008, Bethel African Methodist Church leased the St. Andrews school building to the MATCH Charter School to launch its new grade 6-8 middle school, and the kindergarten building to the Young Achievers Pilot School to be used as an arts space.

=== Upham Church ===
Upham Memorial Church, a small Methodist church at the corner of Wachusett and Patten Streets, was completed in 1901. Previously, Forest Hills Methodist Society had been holding services in a rented hall in the Forest Hills area. Designed by James G. Hutchinson in a Tudor Revival style, this wooden church was built with a corner tower and half-timbering. A later addition was added in 1925.

As this area became increasingly Catholic after World War II, attendance dropped sharply. The church closed in 1969 and remained boarded up and unused until acquired by the Knights of Columbus in 1977. The K's of C added aluminum siding shortly thereafter, obscuring much of the architectural details of the original structure.

This building, along with the Parkman School, used to house The Young Achievers School, a city-wide pilot school. The building was converted to condos after The Young Achievers School relocated to Mattapan.

== Transport ==
=== Forest Hills Station ===
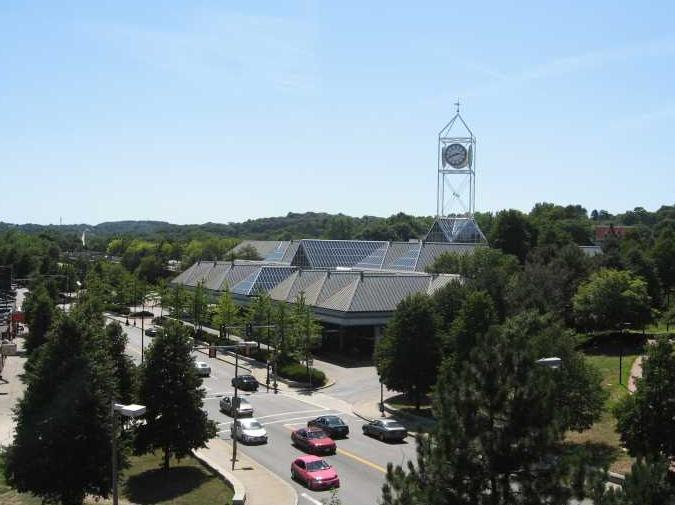
Forest Hills Station, 2007

Forest Hills is served by the Forest Hills Station, a local transportation hub operated by the Massachusetts Bay Transportation Authority (MBTA). This station is the southern end of the Orange Line, is a stop on the Commuter Rail's Needham Line, and was previously the terminal for the Green Line's E branch, until it was truncated to Heath Street in north Jamaica Plain. Service along that route is provided by the 39 bus. Orange line service runs from here north to Malden on the North Shore via Downtown Crossing. Bus routes servicing the station are the 16, 21, 30, 31, 32, 34/34E, 25, 26, 37, 38, 39, 40, 42, 50 and 51, and are accessible from berths all around the station, on upper and lower levels.

This station created the impetus for development of the local area since the Boston & Providence Railroad opened in 1834. The local area got its name after the establishment of the eponymous cemetery in 1848; subsequently, that name was applied to the station.

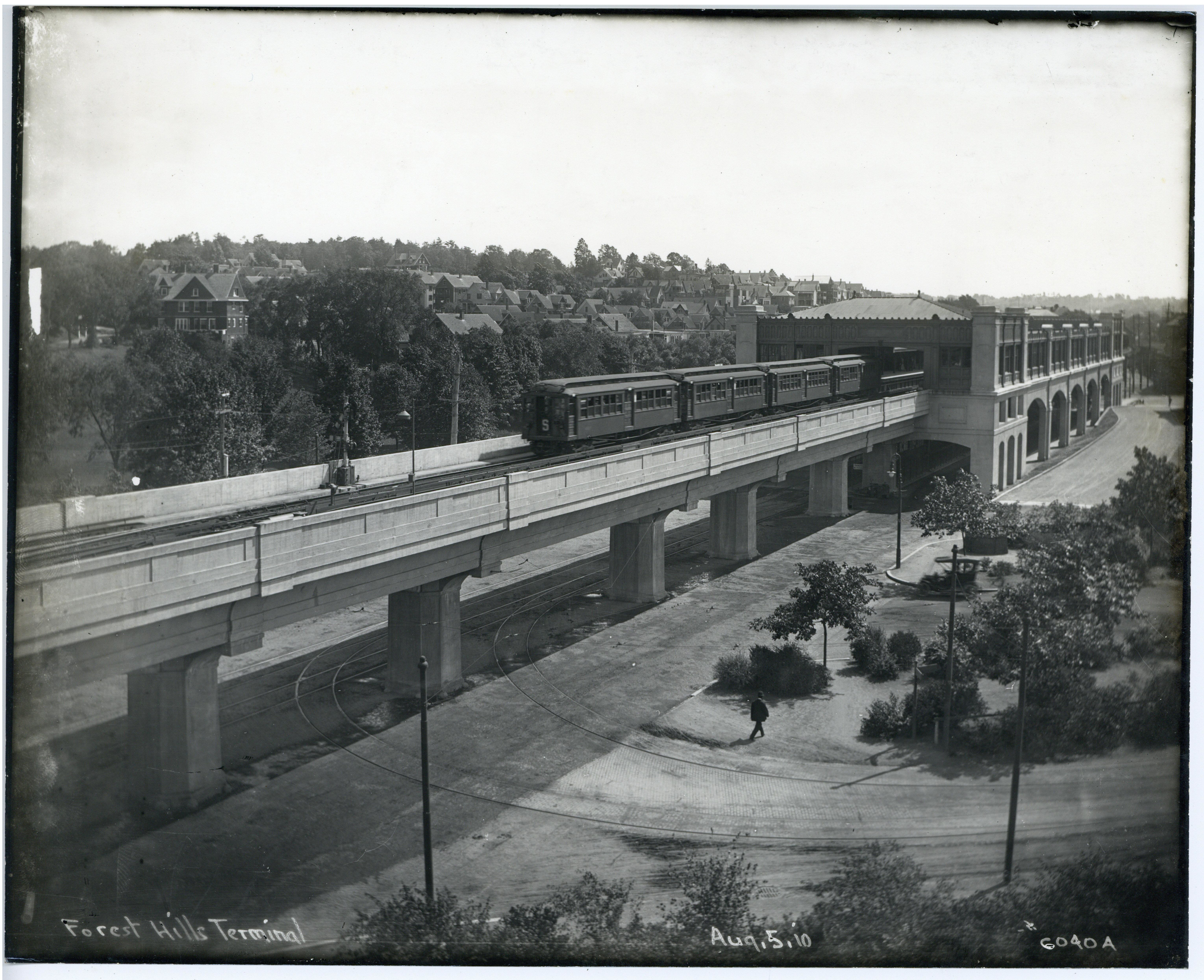
1910 view of the original Forest Hills elevated station

The original Forest Hills Station was a large red brick structure built in the 19th century. In the early 20th century, the traditional tracks to the North were replaced with an elevated railway which lead into Boston and connected with the city's subway, the oldest in the nation. The elevated track and the original station were torn down in the late 1980s. The station was replaced with the current, modern style station and clock tower designed by Cambridge Seven Associates and completed in 1987.

The Monsignor William J. Casey Overpass (a.k.a. Morton Street overpass) stood just north of the station, was built in the 1950s to bypass Forest Hills and connect the Arborway to Morton Street. and was demolished in 2015.

=== Toll Gate Bridge ===
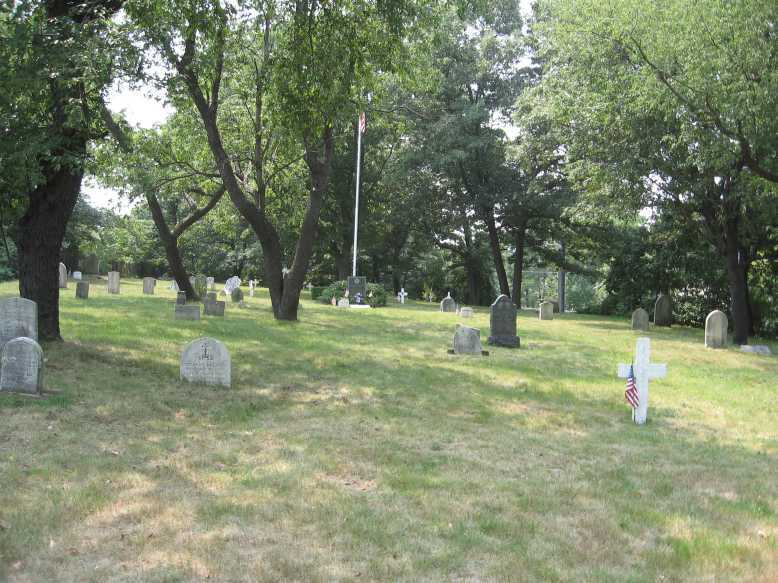
Tollgate Cemetery

Before the trains were built in the 1830s, the area that is now Forest Hills Station was known as (the) Toll Gate. The Norfolk and Bristol Turnpike was created in 1803, providing a main route between Boston and Providence, Rhode Island. The Hartford and Dedham Turnpike was chartered the following year, serving as a main road through to Hartford, Connecticut.

At the facility that stood at what is now the MBTA station, carts and wagons from Roxbury and environs were weighed and charged a toll before being allowed onto the privately owned turnpike. The turnpike became unprofitable and changed into a public road in 1857. In 1874, it was renamed Washington Street and it remains one of the longest streets in the Commonwealth. Long after the train station had acquired the name "Forest Hills", its older identity was preserved in the name of the Toll Gate Bridge, a metal footbridge that crossed the railroad tracks to Washington Street at the point where Walk Hill Street meets Hyde Park Avenue.

In a state of disrepair, the stairs on both sides were removed during the 1990s after Ukraine Way (nearer the station) provided a crossing point for both pedestrians and traffic. The remaining bridge span was torn down in 2012. Adjacent to the footbridge entrance, the small, neglected Tollgate Catholic graveyard containing 19th and early 20th century headstones sits along Hyde Park Avenue. A monument to Irish-American war dead was created in the 1980s, and each year flags are placed on the graves of veterans.

== Notes and references ==
=== References ===
- Boston Area Homes Archived 2006-11-14 at the Wayback Machine
- Boston Globe, "Catholic school set for closing"
- Boston Globe, "Church allowed abuse by priest" Archived October 6, 2006, at the Wayback Machine
- Dedham Historical Society, "A capsule history of Dedham"
- Harvard Magazine, "The Welds of Harvard Yard"
- Jamaica Plain Gazette, October 20, 2006 Archived October 28, 2006, at the Wayback Machine
- Jamaica Plain Historical Society, Boston Daily Globe article from July 5, 1908
- Jamaica Plain Historical Society, "Guide to Jamaica Plain"
- Jamaica Plain Historical Society, "Weld Family"
- Jamaica Plain Historical Society, "Woodbourne and the Boston 1915 Movement"
- Jamaica Plain Historical Society, "Woodbourne Historic District"
- Rappaport Institute for Greater Boston, "Forest Hills MBTA Station"
- Rappaport Institute for Greater Boston, "Forest Hills Street"

=== Bibliography ===
- Bergeron, Ralph. Housing the Middle Class Man, Technical World 14, no. 2, April 1913
- Boston Dwelling House Company. Woodbourne: A Real Estate Development of the Boston Dwelling House Company. Boston: Walton Advertising and Printing Co..
- Boston American. "Scientific Model House Community", December 19, 1911
- Boston Herald. Articles (April 24, 1899; May 8, 1904; April 18, 1913; July 3, 6, 1913)
- Candee, Richard and Greer Hardwicke. Early Twentieth Century Reform Housing by Kilham & Hopkins Architects of Boston, Winterthur Portfolio, Spring 1987, no. 1, vol. 22.
- Channing, K.M. Minot Family Letters, 1773 -1871. Sherborn, Mass., 1957.
- City of Boston. Inspectional Services Department. Building permits.
- Croly, Herbert. "The Work of Kilham & Hopkins, Architects of Boston, Mass." Architectural Record 31, no. 2 (Feb. 1912).
- Drake, Francis S. The Town of Roxbury. Boston: Alfred Mudge and Son, 1878.
- Eggat, Gerald. Richard Olney, Evolution of a Statesman. 1847.
- A Genealogical Record of the Minot Family in America and New England. Boston, 1897.
- Heath, Richard. Summer House to Garden Suburb: A History of Woodbourne in the Forest Hills Section of Jamaica Plain, Boston, 1997.
- O'Connor, Thomas H. Bibles, Brahmins, and Bosses: A Short History of Boston.Trustees of the Public Library of the City of Boston, 1984.
- O'Connor, Thomas H. Boston Catholics: A History of the Church and Its People. Northeastern University Press, 2000.
