= Methodius =

Methodios (Koine Greek: Μεθόδιος) rendered in Latin as Methodius, is a Greek masculine given name, meaning "companion traveler". It is also rendered Mefodiy (Russian: Мефодий), Metodije (Serbian: Методије), etc. It may refer to:

- Methodius of Olympus (d. 311), Christian bishop, church father, and martyr
- Methodios I of Constantinople (c. 790–847), patriarch of Constantinople
- Saint Methodius of Thessaloniki (826–885), Byzantine Greek archbishop of Moravia and scholar, associated with Cyril
- Methodius II of Constantinople, Ecumenical Patriarch in 1240
- Methodius III of Constantinople, Ecumenical Patriarch in 1668–1671
- Methodios Anthrakites (1660–1736), Greek scholar, priest and director of the Gioumeios and Epiphaneios Schools in Ioannina
- Methodios Tournas (born 1946), Greek Orthodox metropolitan of Boston
- Methodius Buslaev, fictional character from Dmitri Yemets's book series
- St. Methodios Faith and Heritage Center, a camp run by the Greek Orthodox Metropolis of Boston located in the town of Hopkinton, New Hampshire, United States
- Methodius, Berat's archbishop, who renovated the Ardenica Monastery in 1743
- Metodyj Trochanovskij (1885–1947), Polish activist

== See also ==
- Apocalypse of Pseudo-Methodius, a seventh-century text purporting to be written by Methodius of Olympus
