= Mission Hill, Boston =

Neighborhood of Boston, Massachusetts, US

- Mission Hill Triangle Historic District
- U.S. National Register of Historic Places
- U.S. Historic district
- Boston Landmark
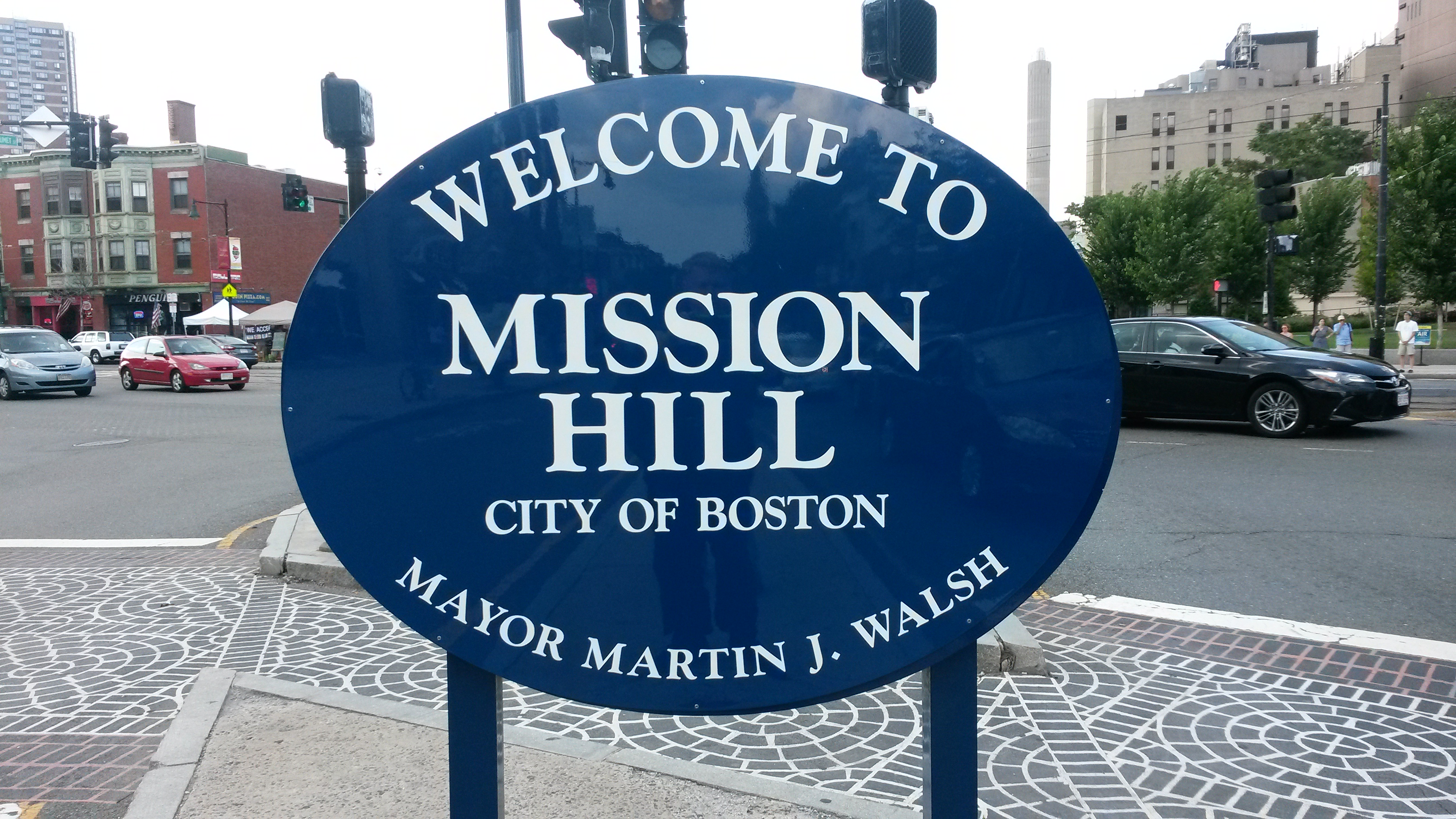
- Welcome sign in Brigham Circle intersection, Mission Hill, Boston, near front of Stoneman Plaza, Brigham and Women's Hospital (BWH)
- Location: Boston, MA
- Coordinates: 42°20′00.32″N 71°06′27.64″W
- Area: 02120
- Architect: Multiple
- Architectural style: Colonial Revival, Late Victorian
- NRHP reference No.: 89001747

Significant dates
- Added to NRHP: November 6, 1989
- Designated BOSL: June 25, 1985

Mission Hill is a 3/4 square mile (2 square km), primarily residential neighborhood of Boston, bordered by Roxbury, Jamaica Plain and Fenway-Kenmore and the town of Brookline. The neighborhood has two main streets, namely Tremont Street and Huntington Avenue. It is served by several stations on the MBTA's Green Line E branch, as well as Roxbury Crossing station on the Orange Line.

Mission Hill is home to several hospitals and universities, including Brigham and Women's Hospital and New England Baptist Hospital. First settled in the 17th century, the neighborhood is known for its brick row houses and triple decker homes of the late 19th century. It is also home to several community centers, several neighborhood groups, one branch of the Boston Public Library, one high school, and one newspaper.

The neighborhood's population was estimated at 15,883 in 2011. Of these 42.7% are white, 18.0% are black, 17.5% are Hispanic, 14.1% are Asian, 1.2% are multiracial, and 1.4% identify as "Other".

== Geography ==
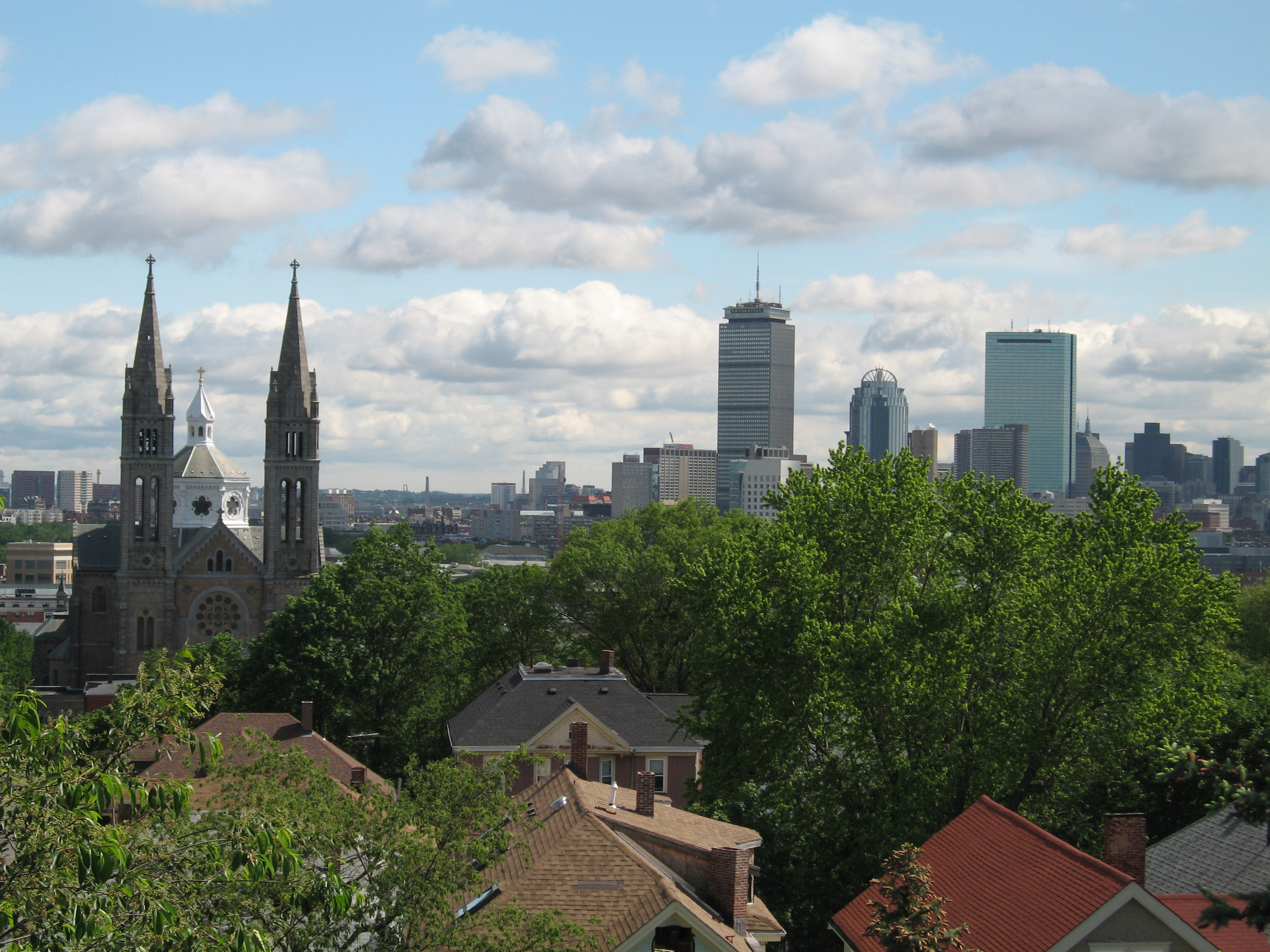
View of Mission Church and Boston skyline from near top of Mission Hill

The neighborhood has two main commercial streets: Tremont Street and Huntington Avenue. Both have several small restaurants and shops. Mission Hill is at the far western end of Tremont Street, with Government Center at the far eastern end. Mission Hill's main ZIP Code is 02120. Additionally, a very small portion of the southeastern edge uses the ZIP Code 02130, areas adjacent to the Longwood Medical Area use 02115 and two streets on the far western edge use 02215.

Parker Hill, Back of The Hill, and Calumet Square are areas within the Mission Hill, an officially designated neighborhood in Boston (as attested by numerous signs prohibiting parking without a suitable Mission Hill neighborhood residential sticker, which only residents can procure legally).

Brigham Circle, located at the corner of Tremont and Huntington is the neighborhood's commercial center, with a grocery store, drug stores, bistros, banks and taverns. One block up the hill from Brigham Circle is Boston's newest park, Kevin W. Fitzgerald Park (formerly Puddingstone Park) created when a new $60-million mixed use building was completed in 2002.

On Tremont Street is Our Lady of Perpetual Help Basilica (1878, Schickel and Ditmars, 1910 towers addition by Franz Joseph Untersee), an eponymous landmark building that dominates the skyline of the area. The church was chosen as the location for the funeral of Senator Edward M. Kennedy on Saturday, August 29, 2009.

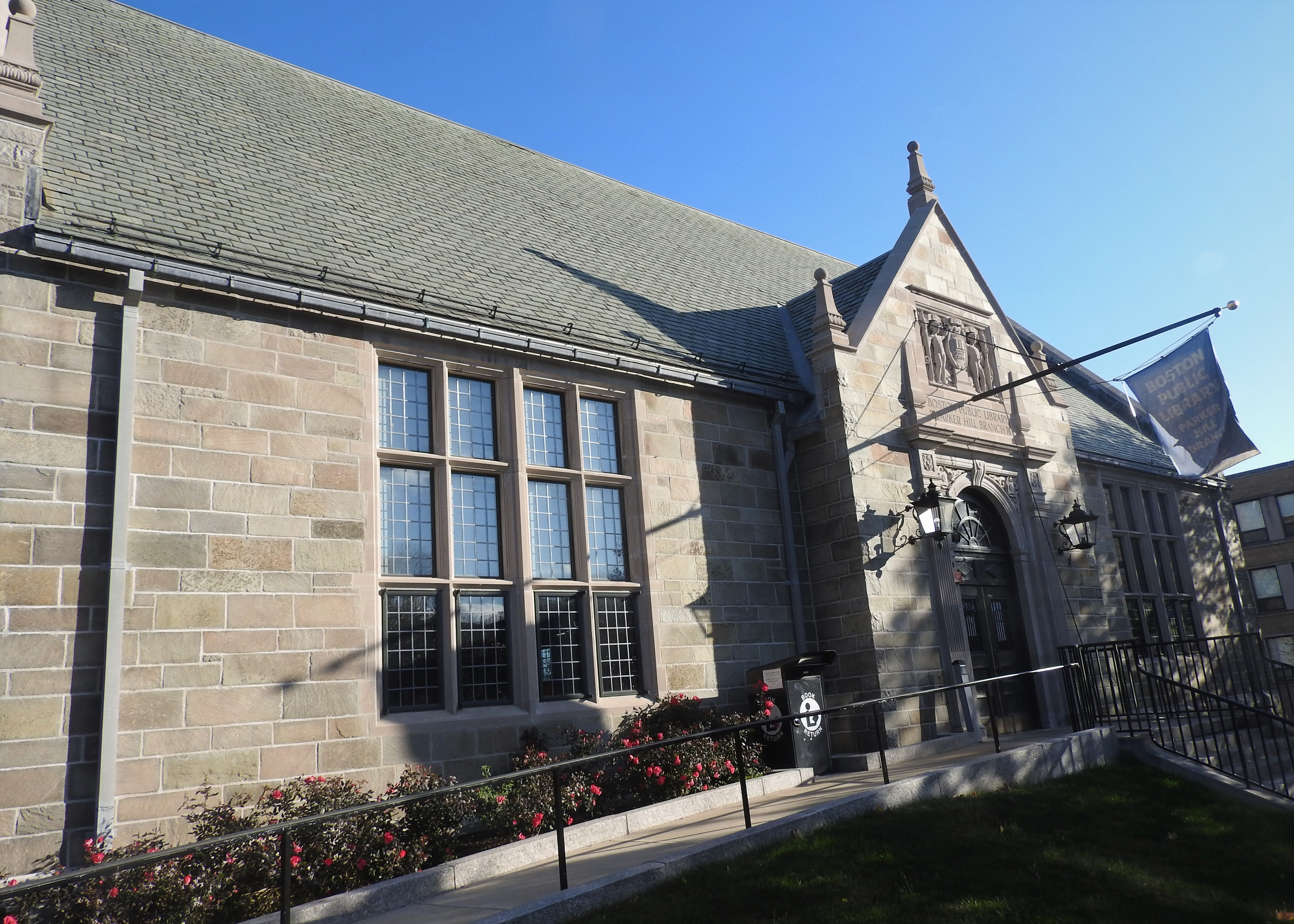
Parker Hill Branch, BPL

Also nearby is the recently restored Parker Hill Library, the neighborhood branch of the Boston Public Library, and designed by architect Ralph Adams Cram in 1929. The city used eminent domain to acquire the land for both the library and the adjacent Mission Hill playground.

Atop the hill are the New England Baptist Hospital and the Parker Hill Playground, which extends from the hospital grounds down Parker Hill Avenue.

=== Location ===
The neighborhood is roughly bounded by Columbus Avenue and the Boston neighborhood of Roxbury to the east, Ruggles Street to the northeast and the Olmsted designed Riverway/Jamaicaway, and the town of Brookline to the west. The Historic District was designated by the Boston Landmarks Commission in 1985 and is roughly bounded by Smith Street, Worthington Street, Tremont Street (to the south), and Huntington Avenue (to the west). The Mission Hill neighborhood is immediately north of the Boston neighborhood of Jamaica Plain. It is served by the MBTA Green Line E branch and the Orange Line, and is within walking distance of the Boston Museum of Fine Arts and the Gardner Museum. "The Hill" overlaps with about half of the Longwood Medical and Academic Area, home to 21 health care, research, and educational institutions which together provides the largest employment area in the City of Boston outside of downtown Boston. Due to these adjacencies, the neighborhood is often struggling with institutional growth taking residential buildings and occupying storefront commercial space. Recent years have seen new retail stores, restaurants, and residential development giving the neighborhood a stronger political voice and identity, as some of the educational institutions have made commitments to house all or most of their about 2000 undergraduate students in newly erected campus housing, including several new high-rise dormitories. People aged 20 to 24 account for 32% of the population currently living in Mission Hill.

The Mission Hill Triangle is an architectural conservation district with a combination of freestanding houses built by early wealthy landowners, blocks of traditional brick rowhouses, and many triple-deckers.

The neighborhood was named in March 2008 as one of 25 "Best ZIP Codes in Massachusetts" by The Boston Globe, citing increased value in single-family homes, plentiful restaurants and shopping, a marked racial diversity, and the behavioral fact that 65% of residents walk, bike, or take public transit to their work.

=== Green space ===
There are a few large parks in Mission Hill for walking or sitting.

One is known as Kevin W. Fitzgerald Park, formerly named Puddingstone Park because of the local rock sources, the park includes lawn space and asphalt walkways. The walkway is lined with benches for people to rest and enjoy the various views such as Lower Roxbury, the Fenway, and Back Bay. This park was previously one of the five quarries in Boston. This park was known as the Harvard Quarry. The operation of the quarry was ceased around 1910 and this left a 65-foot-high quarry wall. In the 1990s, the open space planning committee worked on preserving public access to the quarry. The community and the developer decided together that the walls of the old quarry would be preserved and they would create a new 6-acre open space for the community at the top of the puddingstone bowl. Harvard Quarry Urban Wild was then named Puddingstone Park. In November 2006, the park was renamed Kevin Fitzgerald Park in honor of the former Massachusetts State Representative. Most of the land is already being developed on for more housing and institutional purposes. Only 6.2 acres of land are protected for preservation of public access.

McLaughlin Park is another park located in Mission Hill. The park was renovated with a $430,000 budget in 2015, providing various upgrades such as new paths, overlooks, and reparations to the Ben's tower monument. This tower is to honor a child who once enjoyed playing in the park, but passed from cancer.

The Butterfly Garden located on the Back of The Hill is another gated garden, smaller in size.

== Demographics ==
According to the American Community Survey (ACS), Mission Hill's population was 15,883 in 2011. It listed 47.8% of the people in the community as White, 18.0% as Black or African American, 17.5% as Hispanic or Latino, 14.1% as Asian, 1.2% as "two or more races", and 1.4% as "other". Given its proximity to many colleges and universities, and because it houses several dormitories, ages in the neighborhood centered near the early to mid-20s. The ACS estimated residents between the ages 20–24 make up most of the population of Mission Hill, Boston.

Age	Percent	Age	Percent
Under 5 years	3.1%	45 to 49 years	3.9%
5 to 9 years	3.2%	50 to 54 years	2.7%
10 to 14 years	4.3%	55 to 59 years	3.1%
15 to 17 years	2.2%	60 to 64 years	3.2%
18 and 19 years	7.9%	65 to 69 years	1.8%
20 to 24 years	32.3%	70 to 74 years	2.9%
25 to 29 years	9.4%	75 to 79 years	2.0%
30 to 34 years	6.0%	80 to 84 years	1.4%
35 to 39 years	4.4%	85 years and over	2.4%
40 to 44 years	3.9%		

The 2011 ACS listed median household income in Mission Hill as $33,432 during a 12-month span. 21.1% of the households made less than $10,000 yearly. The median family income during a 12-month span was $36,237. The highest percent of family income accounts for 12.0% and they make between $75,000 to $99,999 yearly. Out of 6,230 households, 1,300 received food stamps/SNAP over a 12-month span. However, Mission Hill Neighborhood Housing Services claims that "Mission Hill's population of 18,722 people is racially and economically diverse" on its website. Seeming disparities in statistics might recurringly result from the very large number of short-term undergraduates and visiting international faculty, postdocs, researchers, and professional degree candidates who may or may not appear in statistical data sets that are cited for publication.

== History ==
Industry began in the area as early as the 17th century.

Much of the early history of Mission Hill through 1978 is covered in a 65-minute documentary video, Mission Hill and the Miracle of Boston, a widely used documentary which was directed by Richard Broadman (died 2002) of the Museum of Fine Arts and released in 1978. The film recounts the events that led to the Urban Renewal Program in Boston and its aftermath by showing how these events unfolded in Mission Hill.

=== 17th and 18th century ===
Like the adjacent neighborhood of Jamaica Plain to the south, Mission Hill was once a neighborhood of adjacent Roxbury before Roxbury's annexation by Boston. According to maps from the period, it was often referenced as Parker Hill (which is the name of the geographic feature in the area). After annexation (and more rapidly in recent years) the area slowly came to be considered a separate neighborhood of its own right. The majority of government, commercial, and institutional entities list "Mission Hill" in the breakdown of Boston neighborhoods and its boundaries generally agreed upon.

Until the American Revolution, Mission Hill supported large country estates of wealthy Boston families. Much of the area was an orchard farm, originally owned by the Parker family in the 18th century. Peter Parker married Sarah Ruggles, whose family owned large areas of land including most of what became known as Parker Hill (later renamed Mission Hill). Parker's life ended when a barrel of his own cider fell on him. (Much of this story is outlined in "The History of Peter Parker and Sarah Ruggles", a book by John William Linzee, published in 1913.) An annual 'cider press' neighborhood event is held in the 'top of the hill' park adjacent to New England Baptist Hospital, commemorating this neighborhood narrative.

The orchard continued for some time thereafter, but gradually pieces of the land were sold and developed. Boston's reservoir was once located at the top of the hill. Many of the older apple trees along Fisher Avenue and in an undeveloped area of the playground are probably descendants of the Parker family's original trees. The lower portion of the eastern hill was a puddingstone quarry with large swaths owned by merchants Franklin G. Dexter, Warren Fisher, and Fredrick Ames.

View from top of Parker Hill, 1910

Maps of the area indicate Mission Hill development began before the Fenway and Longwood Medical Area. Huntington Avenue, now one of the main connections to the rest of Boston, once stopped at the intersection of Parker Street, near the present-day site of the Museum of Fine Arts. Up until that time, Mission Hill was connected via Parker Street (a man-made raised passage between the Stony Brook and the Muddy River – both which formed a tidal flat into the Charles River) all the way to Boylston Street in the Back Bay. Part of what was once Parker Street is now called Hemenway Street. The once main intersection of Parker Street and Huntington Avenue has been traffic-engineered, cutting the straight-line road in two and forcing traffic to first turn onto Forsyth Way to make the connection. Many other streets leading into Mission Hill were also realigned and/or renamed at Huntington Avenue (including Longwood Avenue/McGreevey Way, Smith/Shattuck Street, Vancouver Street, and Palace Road/Worthington Street), limiting both pedestrian and vehicular access.

=== 19th century ===
The first brewery was established at the foot of Parker Hill in the 1820s. By the 1870s beer production was the main industry in Mission Hill, and many breweries lined the Stony Brook (now a culvert running along the Southwest Corridor). Most of Boston's breweries were once located in Mission Hill, but three periods of Prohibition (1852–1868, 1869–1875 and 1918–1933) and the nation's transition from local breweries to national mass-produced brands took their toll on business. Many of the remaining buildings are now being converted into loft condominia.

After the 1880s and the re-routing of the Muddy River by Frederick Law Olmsted, Huntington Avenue was joined from Parker Street to Brigham Circle, creating the Triangle District. (Maps from the time indicate that Huntington Avenue from Brigham Circle to the Brookline line was named Tremont Street.)

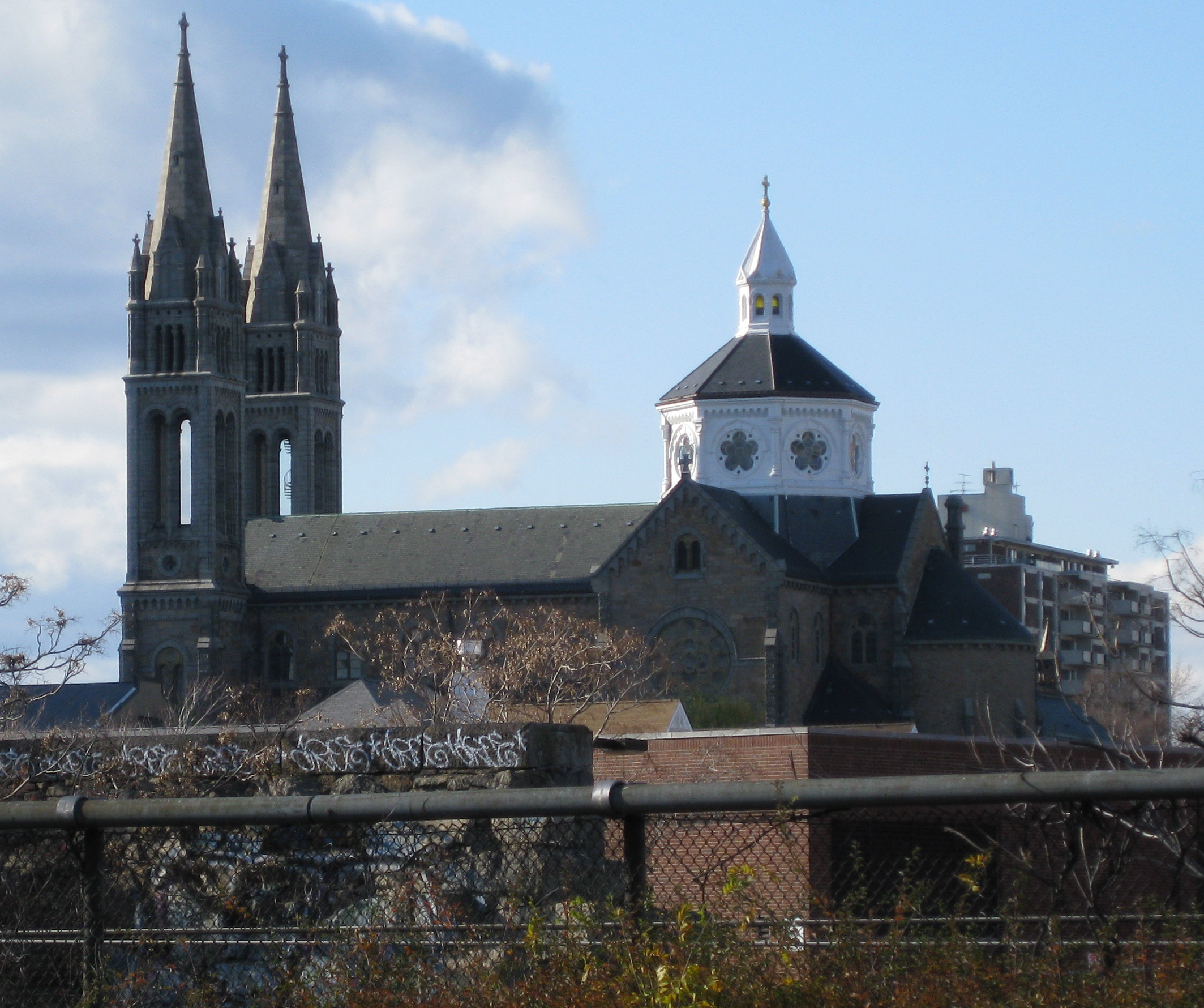
Mission Church

Development began in earnest in the mid-19th century. In 1870, the Redemptorist Fathers built a humble wooden mission church that was replaced by an impressive Roxbury puddingstone structure in 1876. In 1910, dual-spires were added that now dominate the skyline. The church was elevated to basilica in 1954 by Pope Pius XII and is one of less than 100 in the United States. Officially named Our Lady of Perpetual Help after the icon of the same name, it is uniformly referred to as "Mission Church", even by its own parishioners. Due to a sloping foundation of this landmark, the west cross tops its tower at 215 feet (66 m); the other spire is two feet shorter. The length of the church is also 215 feet (66 m), presenting a perfect proportion.

At one time, the Basilica was a campus of buildings; the Queen Anne style Sister's Convent and Grammar School (1888–1889, Henry Burns) and the Romanesque Revival St. Alphonsus Hall (1898, Franz Joseph Untersee) administered by the parish. The church closed Mission Church High School in 1992, but a parochial elementary school still remains. The sale of these buildings at 80–100 Smith Street allowed much of the church to be restored. The sold buildings are currently planned to be used for 'Basilica Court,' a 229-unit residential complex, developed by Weston Associates, Inc. The Hall was the club headquarters for the St. Alphonsus Association founded in 1900. It was the preeminent social and athletic Catholic men's organization for nearly 50 years and its 1000-seat theater held many community, political, and theatrical events.

Another example of high religious architecture is the Annunciation Greek Orthodox Cathedral of New England at 514 Parker Street at the eastern edge of the neighborhood. Referred to as the "mother church" of the Greek Orthodox Church in New England, it is the cathedral of the Diocese of Boston and the seat of Bishop Methodios Tournas. Built between 1892 and 1927, it is one of the oldest Greek churches in the United States, a Boston landmark, and is listed on the National Register of Historic Places. In 1927 a Greek artist was commissioned to decorate the cathedral with Byzantine iconography. The radiant stained glass windows and large crystal chandeliers also contribute to the visual majesty of the cathedral's interior.

Puddingstone plays a historic role in the area. The large puddingstone quarry that ran between Tremont Street and Allegany Street produced the stone foundations of most of the late-19th-century houses in the neighborhood. This locally sourced material made quick construction of working-class housing possible. Some structures around the Tremont Street/Parker Street intersection are made entirely of the material, including 682–688 Parker Street, 2–5 Sewall Street and 1472–74 Tremont Street (1856, David Connery, mason).

Most of the houses in the neighborhood are stone foundations and wood construction, but the Triangle Historic District along Huntington Avenue is stone and brick, and one of only eight such districts in Boston given landmark status by the city. These seventy-one buildings bordered by Huntington Avenue, Tremont Street, and Worthington Street exemplify the development of the neighborhood from the 1870s through the 1910s. Construction of this area was begun in 1871. The Helvetia, a distinctive apartment hotel, was built at 706–708 Huntington Avenue in 1884–1885; a Georgian revival apartment building known as The Esther was built at 683 Huntington/142–148 Smith Street in 1912. Both buildings continue have retail on the ground floor and apartments above. Similar row houses line one side of Delle Avenue a few blocks away from the Triangle District. Taller and larger brick row houses also line Huntington Avenue, Wait Street, and South Huntington.

By 1894, the electric streetcar was in operation on Huntington Avenue. Builder-developers began cutting streets through the hillside farmland and building homes for commuters on Parker Hill Avenue, Hillside Street, and Alleghany Street. An excellent example from this era is the Timothy Hoxie House at 135 Hillside Street. A freestanding Italianate villa, it was built in 1854 across from its present location. The Hoxie family left Beacon Hill for pastoral Mission Hill. Single-family houses of this size are rare today in the area. Demand for housing went up and builders turned to building multifamily dwellings, generally constructed on smaller lots.

The carpenter-contractor John Cantwell lived in the Gothic Revival cottage at 139 Hillside Street, and purchased the Hoxie House after Timothy's death. He moved the house to its present site so that upper Sachem Street could be cut through. Cantwell also developed triple deckers on adjacent lots on Darling and Sachem Streets. In 1890, he subdivided the lot on which the Hoxie House stood and built triple-deckers at 17 and 19 Sachem Street.

By the 1890s, there was a more urban feel to the neighborhood and the hill was covered in triple-deckers. Calumet, Iroquois and other streets with Native American names were built up within ten years into a dense neighborhood of triple deckers in the Queen Anne style. The Queen Anne style is prevalent in Mission Hill because this building boom coincided with the popularity of this style. A restoration of this style of houses along Parker Street is becoming something of a Polychrome Row.

Row Houses Along Parker Street

Before 1900, the Georgian Revival New England Baptist Hospital (at the time, the Robert Breck Brigham Hospital) at 125 Parker Hill Ave was one of the few institutions in the neighborhood. Other soon followed, moving from their downtown locations to the Mission Hill/Longwood area for more space and less expensive land (along with the completion of the Emerald Necklace). In 1906, the Harvard Medical School moved into five buildings on Longwood Avenue. Wentworth Institute at 360 Ruggles Street began building in 1911. In 1912, the then Peter Bent Brigham Hospital (now Brigham & Women's Hospital) opened on Brigham Circle. In 1914, Children's Hospital also moved to Longwood Avenue. Beth Israel Deaconess was constructed a short time later.

=== 20th century ===
In the late 19th century through the 1970s, the neighborhood was once home to large numbers of families of recent immigrant descent: mostly Irish, but also Germans, Italians, and others. After the 1950s, the combined effects of urban renewal, white flight, and institutional growth caused many to flee the neighborhood. In the early 1960s, the Boston Redevelopment Authority razed several homes in the Triangle District section of the neighborhood to make way for the Whitney Redevelopment Project, which are three high-rise towers along St. Alphonsus Street. They include Charlesbank Apartments (276-unit highrise that became a limited equity co-op), Back Bay Manor (270 units, now known as CityView at Longwood), and Franklin Square Apartments (formerly Back Bay Towers – 146 units, now known as The Longwood). This project was one of Boston's earliest redevelopment projects not funded by federal renewal monies. Eastward across St. Alphonsus Street is Mission Main, one of the nation's oldest public housing developments. The original thirty-eight 3-story brick structures built between 1938 and 1940 were demolished in the mid-1990s and replaced with 535 new apartments with a mix of subsidized and market-rate units.

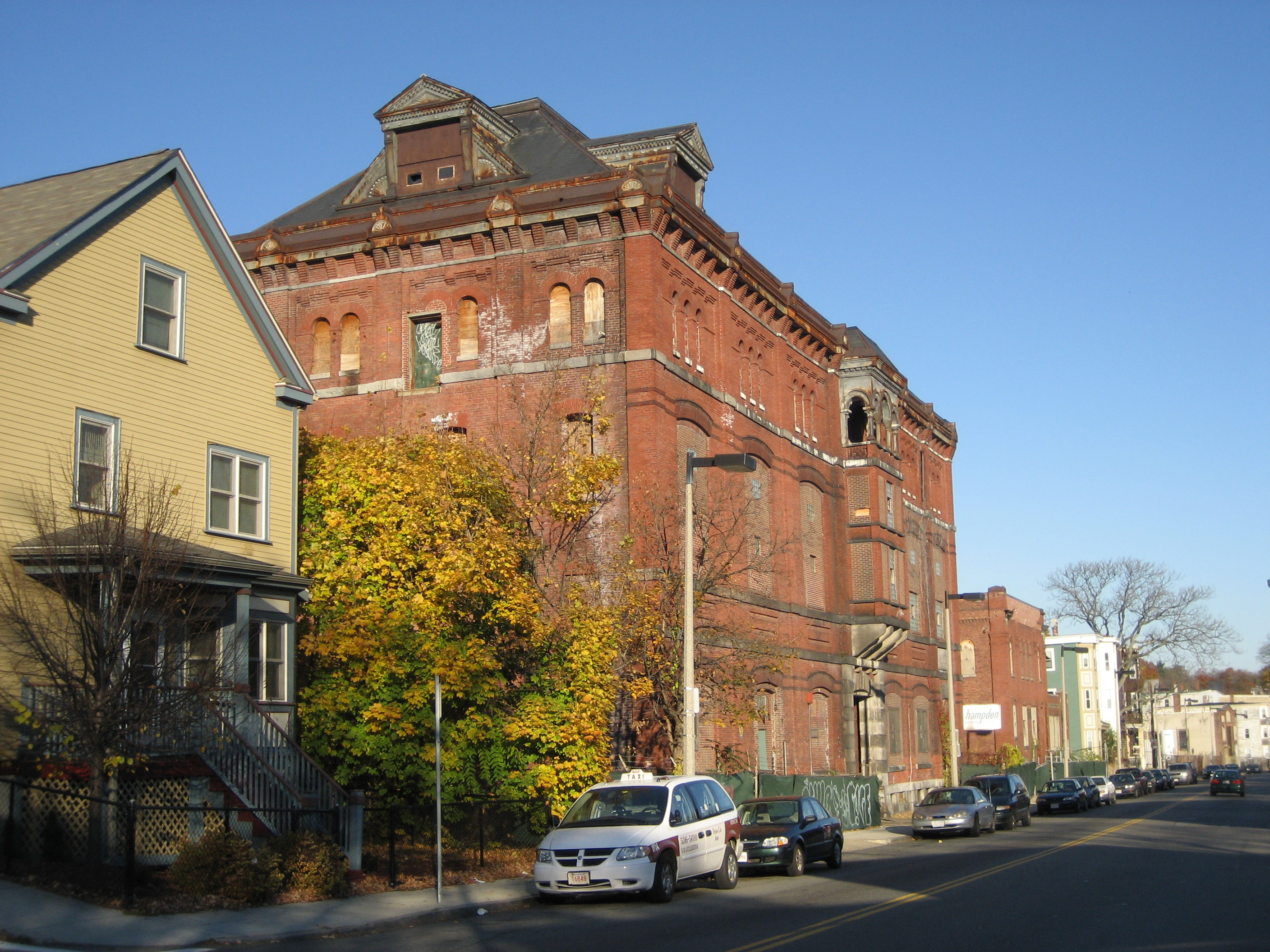
Former Alley Brewing Company building at 117 Heath Street.

Breweries included A.J. Houghton (1870–1918) at 37 Station Street, American Brewing Co. at 251 Heath Street(1891–1934)—now American Brewery Lofts, Union Brewing Co. on Terrace Street (1893–1911), Roxbury Brewing Co. at 31 Heath Street (1896–1899)—the building is now home to the Family Service of Greater Boston, Croft Brewing Co. (1933–1953), Burkhardt Brewing Co. (1850–1918), Alley Brewing Co. at 117 Heath Street (1886–1918) and the Highland Springs Brewery/Reuter & Co. (1867–1918) on Terrace Street—the building is often referred to as The Pickle Factory and is in planning for conversion to housing.

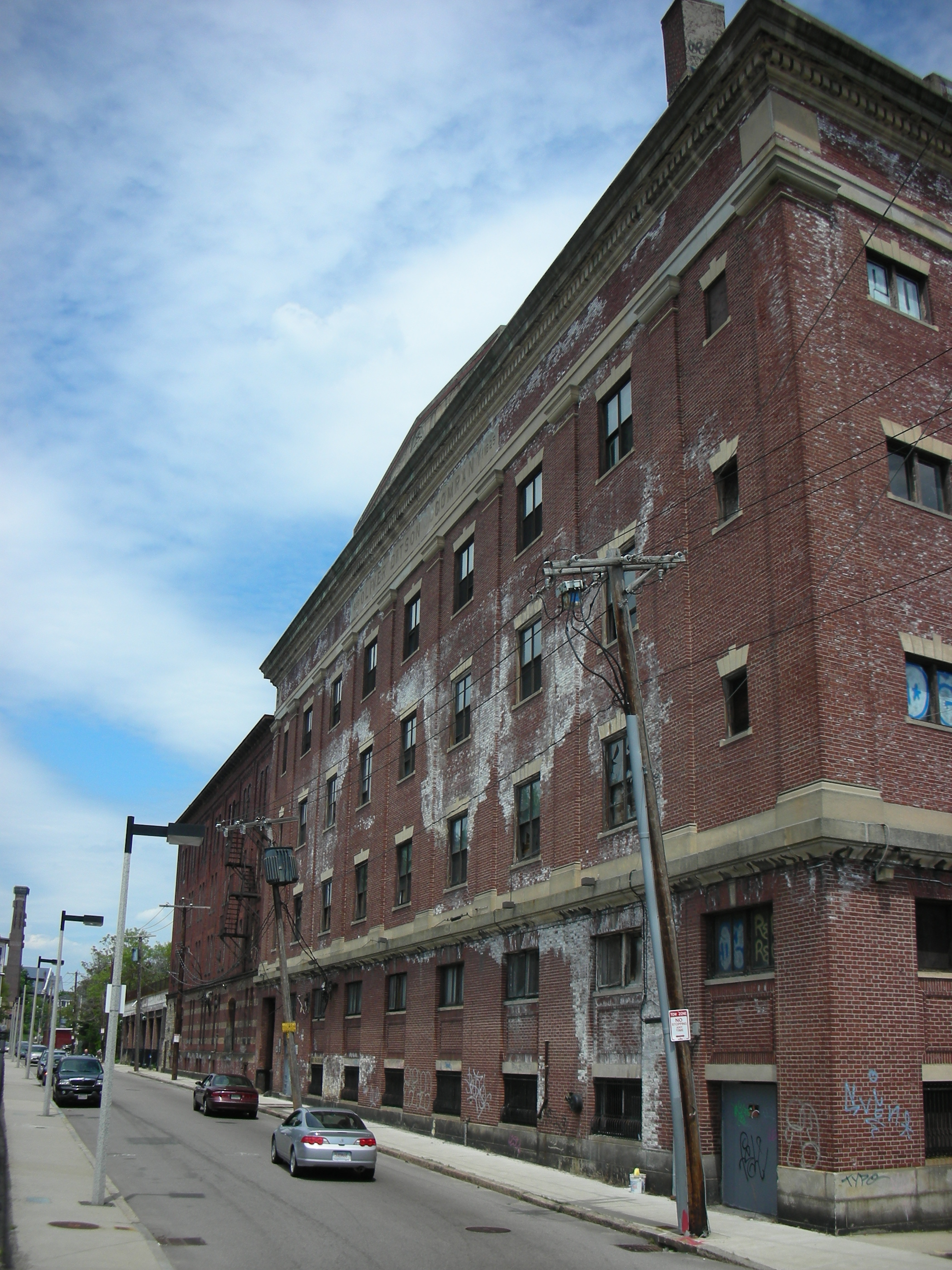
The former Oliver Ditson Company building and later Pickle Factory building, 2007

From 1916 through the early 1950s, Gordon College, related to the Ruggles Street Baptist Church formerly on Ruggles Street, was on Evans Way in the Fenway on the edge of Mission Hill. When Gordon moved out of the neighborhood near the Museum of Fine Arts and relocated to Wenham, Massachusetts, Wentworth Institute of Technology bought the land. The 7-story Alice Heyward Taylor Apartments were completed in 1951; since that time, they have been completely renovated.

In the late 1960s, Harvard University, through straws, thus concealing the purchases from the neighborhood, bought the wood frame and brick houses along Francis, Fenwood, St. Alban's, Kempton Streets, and part of Huntington Avenue, and announced plans to demolish the buildings. Most were replaced with the Mission Park residential complex of towers and townhomes in 1978 after neighborhood residents organized the Roxbury Tenants of Harvard Association to convince Harvard to rebuild. The tower sits on the site of the House of the Good Shepard, once a large and prominent orphanage. The gates to the complex and the brick wall along Huntington survive from this era.

1874 Map of Roxbury Crossing

Also in the 1960s the federal government proposed to extend Interstate 95 into the center of Boston and began buying property and demolishing houses along the Boston and Providence Rail Road. This area, once known as Pierpoint Village after the Pierpoint family and their mills (the earliest of which began in the 1650s), was a stop along the Boston & Providence Railroad in the 1840s, and was once a vibrant commercial area with the 749-seat Criterion Theatre, a Woolworth's, and some restaurants catering to market tastes.

In 1962, the Mission Hill public housing development had 1,024 families (all white), while the Mission Hill Extension project across the street had 580 families (of which 500 were black), and in 1967 when the Boston city government under Mayor John F. Collins (1960–1968) agreed to desegregate the developments, the projects were still 97 percent white and 98 percent black respectively.

The Interstate project was shelved by the governor in 1971 after freeway revolts. Ten years later saw the creation of the Southwest Corridor, a park system with bike and pedestrian trails that lead into the center of Boston. In November 2007, the MBTA awarded Mission Hill Housing Services rights to develop a new 10-story mixed-use building on what is known to the Boston Redevelopment Authority (now the Boston Planning and Development Agency – BPDA) as "Parcel 25", across from the Roxbury Crossing subway station.

By the early 1970s, the area was deemed dangerous and most White people and affluent Black people had moved away. The 1989 incident involving Charles Stuart further intensified this view. With property values low, many of the homes were bought by slum lords and converted into rental housing. The inexpensive rents brought many students from nearby colleges and universities, especially MassArt, Northeastern University, Wentworth Institute of Technology and the School of the Museum of Fine Arts, which has a large studio building in the neighborhood. The Mission Hill Artists Collective now hosts Open Studios in the fall of each year.

As past fears faded by the mid-1990s, the area began to change as homeowners moved into newly converted condominia to take advantage of the fantastic views of the city and proximity to the Longwood Area, the MBTA and downtown Boston.

=== 21st century ===
In 2020, Boston was reported to be the third most "intensely gentrified" city in the United States, listing Mission Hill as one neighborhood undergoing gentrification. One cause of this gentrification is the expansion of nearby universities, such as Northeastern University and Wentworth Institute of Technology. Between 2013 and 2017, the median home value rose from $172,377 to $324,100, and the median household income fell from $23,764 to $16,094.

== Attractions ==
=== Community organizations ===
- The Tobin Community Center is located at 1481 Tremont Street, Boston, Massachusetts. This community center is for Mission Hill and other neighborhoods in the area. This center as stated on the Timothy Smith Network is for social, educational, recreational, and cultural purposes. There are thirty-eight Boston Centers for Youth & Families facilities. The Tobin Center provides programing for children, youth, adults, and families. Most of the programming provided is coed, but it requires a membership. The Tobin Community Center is open all seven days of the week. Some but not all of their programming is free, but participating in programs requires a (free) membership.
- Mission Hill Main Streets (MHMS) is a non-profit organization that helps rejuvenate local businesses, residents, and community organizations. They provide professional support to businesses on operations and property upkeep. Their recently revised (2014) website lists their goals: "Revitalize the Mission Hill commercial area, Increase merchant participation in the Main Street organization and in the life of the Mission Hill community, Provide Mission Hill merchants with technical assistance and with financial and design assistance for storefront renovations, Reduce negative health impacts – noise, clutter, trash, smells – of how business is done, Continuously improve the appearance, healthfulness, safety, and functionality of the Mission Hill business districts and the Mission Hill host community, Work with schools, students, employee groups, neighborhood organizations, and the local District Courts on community services projects throughout the area." The director, Richard Rouse, a former Suffolk County sheriff, writes a monthly column in the Mission Hill Gazette about neighborhood news and the group's accomplishments. They help small businesses stay presentable and solvent in Mission Hill and support the equitable development of a stable presence in Mission Hill. They provide direct financial help to businesses for physical changes, including design and repairs. Residents can refer businesses for help in making their shops look more appealing.
- The Parker Hill Branch Library of the Boston Public Library is open Monday through Saturday, providing year-round children's programs, often collaborating with the Tobin Community Center, the Mission Hill Health Movement, and Mission Hill Artists Group (displaying work by local artists).
- The Mission Hill Health Movement (MHHM) works For a Healthier Hill. From 1968 to 1970, when it was founded (in July 1970), MHHM acted as the Community Health Committee of Parker Hill-Fenway Area Planning Action Committee (APAC), through the local office of the Action for Boston Community Development (ABCD), when it negotiated with the US Department of Health and Human Services and the Harvard Community Health Plan (HCHP) for neighborhood-based coverage by Harvard Community Health Plan. That agreement included the first Medicaid/Medicare HCHP eligibility with sliding scale premiums for Mission Hill residents, and a local primary care outreach/advocacy office with its neighborhood residents in meaningful staff positions. It was instrumental in founding the Fenway Community Health Center. It conducted with neighborhood staff a neighborhood-based door-to-door lead paint testing program and coordinated with the Boston Department of Health and Hospitals (DHH), later (after a series of complex mergers) the Boston Public Health Commission, to offer the first neighborhood-based free flu shots for elderly. It helped establish at Hennigan School a preschool program integrating special needs students into mainstream classes and set up for Mission Hill children the "SWISH" school-based dental care program with fluoride rinses, scheduling Mission Hill 'Swish Moms' to work with and assist Harvard Dental School staff. Current MHHM Programs include: Seasonal Farmers Markets at Roxbury Crossing subway station on the orange line, and Brigham Circle trolley station on the E green line; the Gore St Community Garden; Mission Hill Noise Study with the Boston University Community Noise Lab; Mission Hill Walks! (Walking Group); Video-What I want my Doctor to Know (Filming Spring 2021); COVID-19 response with facemasks and food support; and Annual Mission Hill Health and Wellness Fair.
- Between the Parker Hill Branch Library of the Boston Public Library and Mission Church is Sheehy Park, where young people play, the annual MHHM Mission Hill Community Health, Wellness, and Fitness Fair is held in the Fall and students gather to chat and study after school.

=== Healthcare ===
World class teaching hospitals are found in the adjacent Longwood Medical Area, which is sometimes treated administratively by the city as part of the Mission Hill neighborhood. Some of their buildings have been built inside the residential portion of Mission Hill.

A community relations function of Brigham and Women's hospital supports the Mission Hill community, addressing issues of health care, employment, social programs, and services through outreach to schools, housing developments, youth-serving organizations, and other service groups in Mission Hill and elsewhere in Boston.

Residents may also find their medical home in one of the neighborhood health centers, such as the Whittier Street Health Center.

The Mission Hill Health Movement is a community-based organization addressing an array of health conditions and other issues of residents of the Mission Hill community and surrounding neighborhoods, such as obesity, diabetes, heart disease, mental illness and depression, exercise and energy levels, personal and social responsibility for health, and access to health care. They sponsor the twice-weekly Mission Hill Farmers markets throughout the months of June to November, the annual community health fair (with Massachusetts College of Pharmacy and Health Sciences) and a summer food fair in September, and low-cost fresh produce and bread distribution, the $2 bag program, with Fair Foods of Dorchester. At the Tuesday and Thursday farmers' markets, local farmers sell their freshly picked produce. MHHM sponsors several self-help health programs, including a walking group, a Women's Health Group, and a Diabetes Self-Management Group to educate newly diagnosed and current diabetics and pre-diabetics about how to live responsibly with it, to improve overall health and ease the responsibilities of living day-to-day with chronic diabetes.

=== Education ===
The Fenway High School is a Boston public pilot school. This school is located at 67 Alleghany St, Boston, MA 02120.

Founded in 1983, Fenway became one of Boston's six original pilot schools in 1994. It is devoted to providing a high-quality, personalized education to students from all over the city of Boston. There is no academic admission requirement.

Educational attainment, ages 25+	Total	%	Male	%	Female	%
Total population	7,441	100%	3,360	100%	4,081	100%
Less than high school diploma	1,240	16.7%	455	13.5%	785	19.2%
High school graduate/GED/equivalent	1,787	24.0%	726	21.6%	1,061	26.0%
Some college	1,126	15.1%	569	16.9%	557	13.6%
Associate degree	418	5.6%	171	5.1%	247	6.1%
Bachelor's degree or higher	2,870	38.6%	1,439	42.8%	1,431	35.1%

The table above is an estimation from the American Community Survey during the years of 2007–2011.

Inside the adjacent Longwood Medical Area are the Harvard Medical School, Harvard School of Public Health, Harvard School of Dental Medicine, Massachusetts College of Pharmacy and Health Sciences, and educational programs run by the Harvard teaching hospitals. Also adjacent to Mission Hill/Longwood are the Colleges of the Fenway, Wentworth Institute, Northeastern University, and the School of the Museum of Fine Arts.

=== Newspapers ===
- Mission Hill Gazette

=== Neighborhood groups ===
- Alice Heyward Taylor Tenant Task Force (of the 165 units at Alice Heyward Taylor Apartments)
- Boston Redevelopment Authority neighborhood site
- Community Alliance of Mission Hill – The Mission Hill Beautification Task Force is an ad hoc subgroup of CAMH, seeking to cultivate among the neighborhood's residents and users an ethic or ethos of fair use and responsibility, cleaning up &maintaining the progressive culture of responsibility for safe, lovely, and health-supporting surroundings and the promotion of green residences and other construction in the neighborhood.
- Mission Hill Artists Collective –
- Mission Hill Health Movement – sponsor of twice-weekly farmers' markets, extremely low cost fresh produce and bread distribution with ($2 bag of produce with Fair Foods of Dorchester), and an annual community health fair in Sheehy Park on Tremont Street, in mid-April
- Mission Hill Main Streets –
- Mission Hill Neighborhood Housing Services – MHNHS manages many multi-unit properties in Mission Hill and invites community members to review its work in its annual meeting in the Spring.
- Mission Main Tenant Task Force, Smith Street
- Roxbury Tenants of Harvard
- Sociedad Latina, Tremont Street
- Mission Hill Arts Festival

== See also ==
- Basilica and Shrine of Our Lady of Perpetual Help
- City of Boston's web page regarding Mission Hill neighborhood, including four data-filled resources
- District 8, Boston
- Kostachuk Square
- MTA
- National Register of Historic Places listings in southern Boston
