= Fitzgerald Park =

Fitzgerald Park or FitzGerald Park may refer to:

- Fitzgerald's Park, Cork City, Ireland
- FitzGerald Park, Kilmallock, Ireland
- Páirc Mhic Gearailt, Fermoy GAA, Cork, Ireland
- Kevin W. Fitzgerald Park, Mission Hill, Boston, Massachusetts, USA

== See also ==
- Fitzgerald Stadium, Killarney, Ireland
- Fitzgerald River National Park, Western Australia
