= Diocese of Boston =

Diocese of Boston may refer to:

- Greek Orthodox Metropolis of Boston, an ecclesiastical territory of the Greek Orthodox Church
- Roman Catholic Archdiocese of Boston, an ecclesiastical Archdiocese of the Roman Catholic Church
