= Puddingstone =

Puddingstone may refer to:

- Puddingstone (rock), a type of sedimentary rock
- Puddingstone Park, a park in Boston, Massachusetts
- Lake Puddingstone, a lake in Los Angeles County, California
- Puddingstone Island, a small islet in New Zealand's Otago Harbour
