= Metodije =

Metodije (Serbian: Методије) is the Serbian variant of the Greek and Christian masculine given name Methodios. It may refer to:

- Metodije (fl. 1219), Serbian Orthodox bishop
- Metodije, Metropolitan of Belgrade (1791–1801)
- Metodije Ostojić (b. 1976), Serbian Orthodox bishop
- Metodije Spasovski (b. 1946), Yugoslav Macedonian footballer
