= Brigham Circle =

Major intersection Boston, Massachusetts

Coordinates: 42°20′2.86″N 71°6′17.48″W

Brigham Circle is located at the intersection of Tremont Street and Huntington Avenue in the Mission Hill neighborhood of Boston, Massachusetts. The commercial center of Mission Hill, it forms the southern tip of the Longwood Medical Area.

The area is named for the Peter Bent Brigham Hospital (now a wing of the larger Brigham and Women's Hospital), which stands at one side of the circle and is approached through Stoneman Plaza. The intersection was never a true traffic circle like other circles in Boston. Huntington Avenue has had through lanes since at least the early 20th century; a small rotary was present at the junction of Francis Street on the northwest side. Near MBTA stops is a street-level park with metal benches that sites farmers' markets, and entrances to Kevin W. Fitzgerald Park (formerly Puddingstone Park) and other parks are nearby.

== Transportation ==
The light rail MBTA Green Line E branch runs through the center of the circle. East of Brigham Circle it runs on a reserved reservation in the median of Huntington; west of the circle it runs in mixed traffic. Brigham Circle station lies just to the east of Brigham Circle, with Fenwood Road station just to the west.

Two MBTA bus routes pass through Brigham Circle. Route 39 parallels the radial E branch via Huntington Avenue, while route 66 is a major circumferential connector. The Mission Hill Link circulator also serves Brigham Circle.

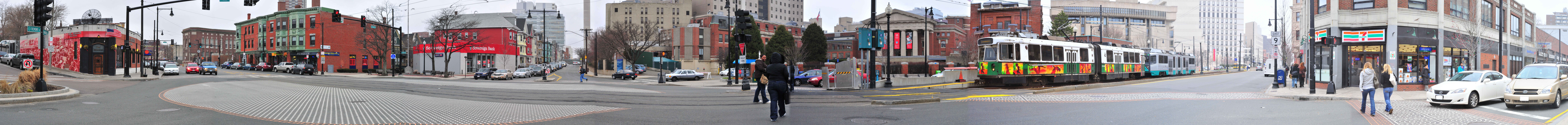
Panoramic view of Brigham Circle
