= Huntington Avenue =

Major thoroughfare in Boston, Massachusetts

Huntington Avenue
- Avenue of the Arts

Route information
- Length: 3.0 mi (4.8 km)

Major junctions
- West end: Route 9 at Washington Street / Riverway at the Brookline border
- Route 28; Ruggles Street / Louis Prang Street; I-90 Massachusetts Turnpike (below grade)
- East end: Dartmouth Street at Copley Square

Location
- Country: United States
- State: Massachusetts

Highway system
- Massachusetts State Highway System; Interstate; US; State

Huntington Avenue is a major arterial thoroughfare in Boston, Massachusetts, measuring approximately 3.0 miles (4.8 km) in length. It originates at Copley Square in the Back Bay and continues southwest through the Fenway, Longwood, and Mission Hill neighborhoods to the town border of Brookline. The avenue carries the concurrency for Route 9 between Copley Square and Brookline.

In 1998, the City of Boston officially designated a central section of Huntington Avenue as the Avenue of the Arts to honor its concentration of cultural, musical, educational, and artistic institutions.

== Route description ==
=== Back Bay ===
Huntington Avenue begins at the western edge of Copley Square at the intersection of Dartmouth Street and St. James Avenue, adjacent to the Boston Public Library, Trinity Church, and Copley Place. Heading southwest, it forms the southeastern boundary of the Prudential Center complex and passes the Mother Church and Christian Science Center, known for its 670-foot-long (200 m) reflecting pool and I. M. Pei-designed plaza.

=== Avenue of the Arts (Fenway) ===
Past its intersection with Massachusetts Avenue, Huntington Avenue enters the Fenway cultural corridor. Here, the street is flanked by landmark performing arts venues and universities:

- Symphony Hall, home of the Boston Symphony Orchestra, designed by McKim, Mead & White and opened in 1900.
- Horticultural Hall, headquarters of the Massachusetts Horticultural Society from 1901 to 1992.
- New England Conservatory and Jordan Hall.
- The Huntington Theatre Company at the historic Boston University Theatre.
- The main campus of Northeastern University, which lines both sides of the roadway between Forsyth Street and Museum Way.
- The Museum of Fine Arts (MFA), with its classical Beaux-Arts main facade designed by Guy Lowell fronting the avenue.
- Higher-education arts and technical colleges including Wentworth Institute of Technology, the Massachusetts College of Art and Design (MassArt), and the School of the Museum of Fine Arts at Tufts.

=== Longwood and Mission Hill ===
Continuing westward, Huntington Avenue skirts the southern edge of the Longwood Medical and Academic Area, passing the Massachusetts College of Pharmacy and Health Sciences (MCPHS), Harvard T.H. Chan School of Public Health, and access routes to Harvard Medical School, Brigham and Women's Hospital, and Boston Children's Hospital.

At Brigham Circle, the avenue ascends into Mission Hill. The median reservation ends here, and the Green Line E branch tracks share traffic lanes with motor vehicles. Huntington Avenue terminates at the intersection of South Huntington Avenue and the Riverway parkway at the Brookline border, where Route 9 continues west into Brookline as Washington Street and Boylston Street.

== History ==
=== 19th-century laying out and naming ===
Prior to the mid-19th century, the area now occupied by eastern Huntington Avenue was part of the tidal salt marshes of Boston's Back Bay. Following the 1857 legislative acts that authorized the filling of the bay, civil engineers planned broad radial boulevards connecting downtown Boston to the surrounding suburbs. The proposed southwest thoroughfare was initially referred to as "Western Avenue".

On December 29, 1864, the Boston Board of Aldermen officially named the thoroughfare Huntington Avenue in honor of Ralph Huntington (1784–1866), an influential Boston banker, real estate developer, and philanthropist. Huntington had been an early advocate for reclaiming the Back Bay marshes and donated substantial endowments to establish the Massachusetts Institute of Technology (MIT) and the Boston Society of Natural History, both of which originally stood near the head of the avenue.

Originally, Huntington Avenue began at the intersection of Clarendon and Boylston Streets, running diagonally across Art Square (renamed Copley Square in 1883) past Trinity Church. During the 1960s, the Boston Redevelopment Authority pedestrianized the square and eliminated this diagonal section, truncating the avenue's eastern origin at Dartmouth Street.

=== Streetcars and the Huntington Avenue subway ===
In 1883, the Metropolitan Railroad laid horsecar tracks along Huntington Avenue from Francis Street to Copley Square, routing streetcars along a dedicated median. The line was electrified in 1894 by the West End Street Railway.

Between 1937 and 1941, the Works Progress Administration (WPA) financed and excavated the Huntington Avenue subway, a 4,300-foot (1,311 m) tunnel beneath the avenue. Opened on February 16, 1941, the subway portal near Opera Place redirected streetcars underground, connecting directly into the Boylston Street subway west of Copley Square and adding two subterranean stations: Mechanics (now Prudential) and Symphony.

=== Sports and entertainment landmarks ===
From 1901 to 1911, the block between Forsyth Street and Rogers Avenue was occupied by the Huntington Avenue Grounds, the first home ballpark of the Boston Americans (later renamed the Boston Red Sox). On October 1, 1903, the ballpark hosted the first game of the inaugural modern World Series. On May 5, 1904, Red Sox pitcher Cy Young threw the first modern perfect game in Major League Baseball history here. The site was redeveloped by Northeastern University, which erected a bronze statue of Cy Young in 1993 marking the historical location of the pitcher's mound.

Historic civic halls formerly situated on the avenue include:

- Mechanics' Hall (1881–1959): A large exhibition hall built by the Massachusetts Charitable Mechanic Association at Huntington and West Newton Streets, demolished for the Prudential Center.
- Boston Opera House (1909–1958): Designed by Wheelwright and Haven at Huntington Avenue and Opera Place, financed by Eben Jordan Jr.; demolished in 1958.

== Public transportation ==
Huntington Avenue is a multi-modal transit corridor operated by the Massachusetts Bay Transportation Authority (MBTA):

- Light rail: The Green Line E branch operates along the corridor, running in a tunnel between Copley and the Opera Place portal (serving Prudential and Symphony), surfacing into a center median reservation with stops at Northeastern, Museum of Fine Arts, Longwood Medical Area, and Brigham Circle, and continuing in mixed street traffic to Heath Street.
- Bus lines: MBTA Route 39 operates along the surface of the avenue between Copley Square and South Huntington Avenue. Additional routes using sections of Huntington Avenue include routes 9, 10, 55, 66, 85, 501, and 504.

== Demolished landmarks ==
- Boston Opera House (1909–1958)
- Chickering Hall (1901–1912)
- Mechanics' Hall (1881–1959)
- New England Manufacturers' and Mechanics' Institute building (1881–1886)

== Gallery ==
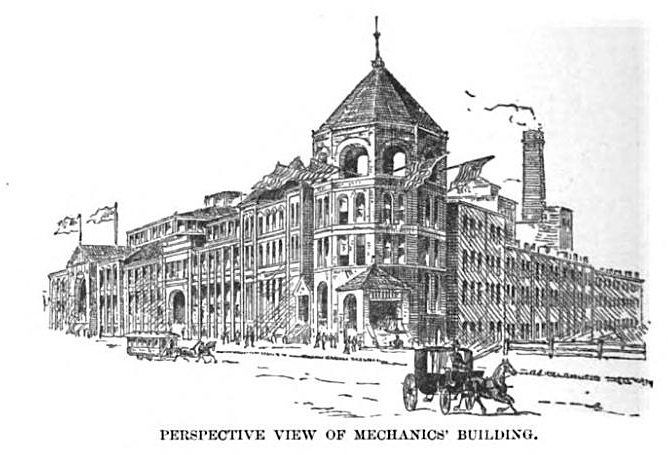
Mechanics' Hall, 1881

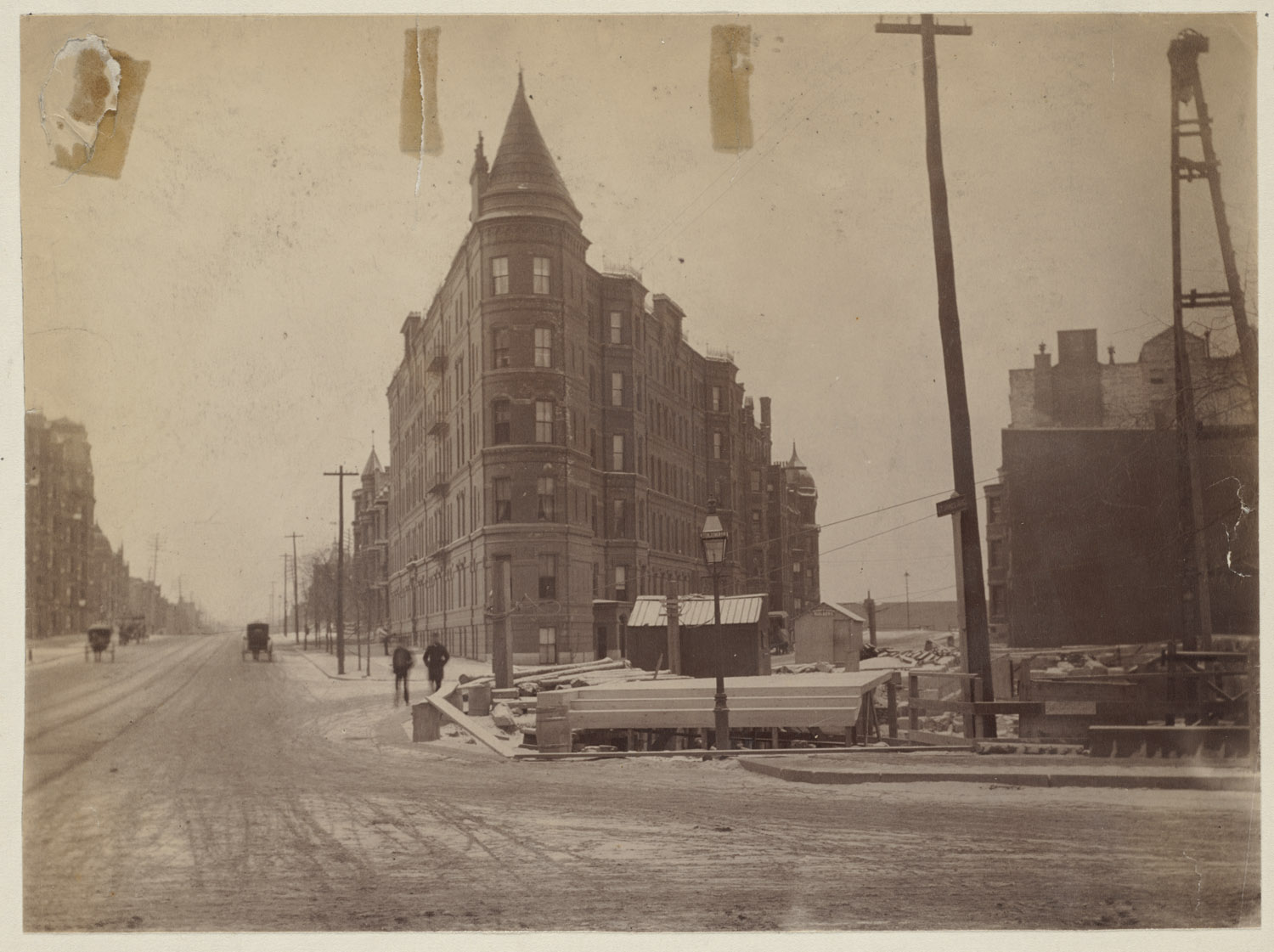
Huntington Ave at Copley Square, 1889

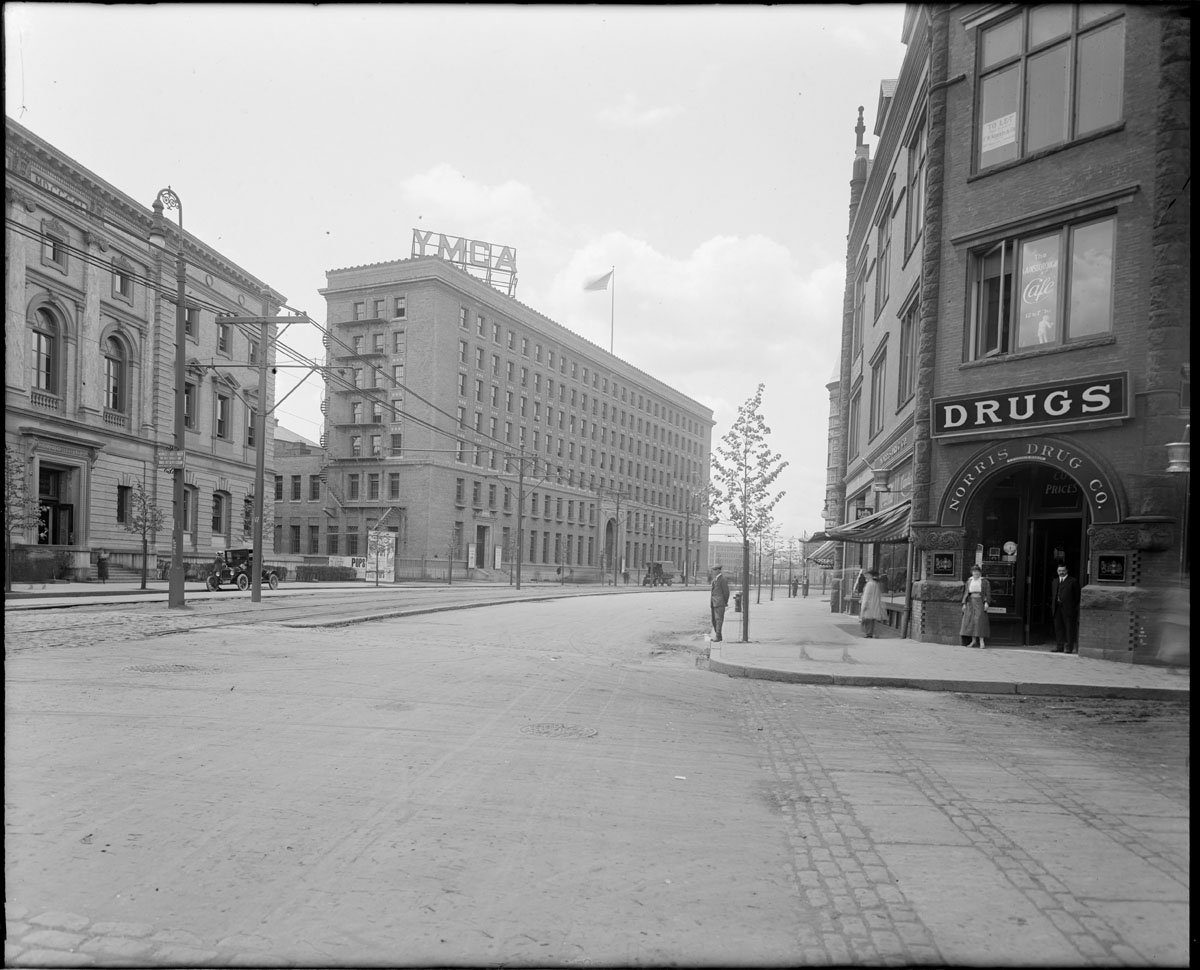
Huntington Ave YMCA, 1920

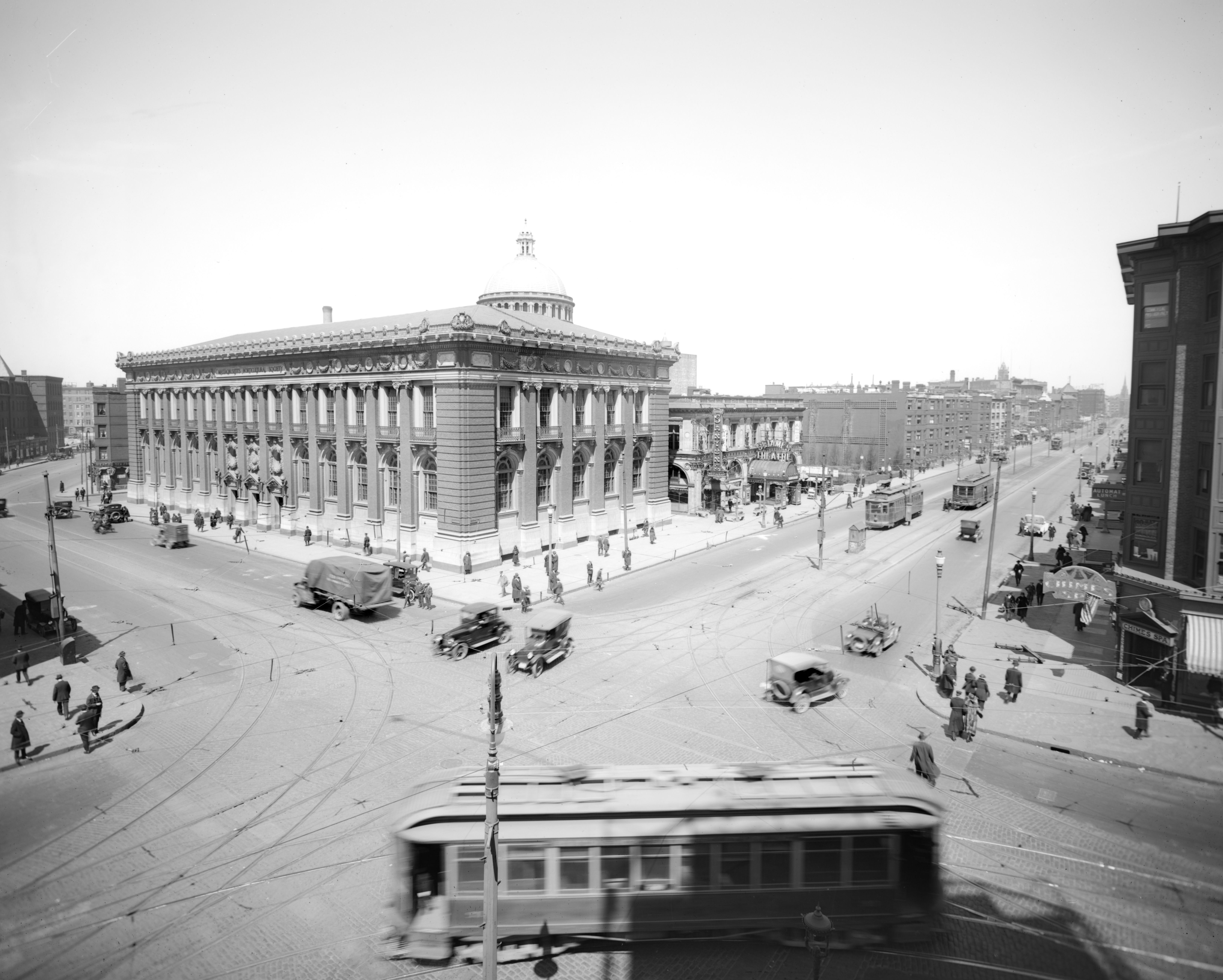
Horticultural Hall at Massachusetts Avenue, 1920

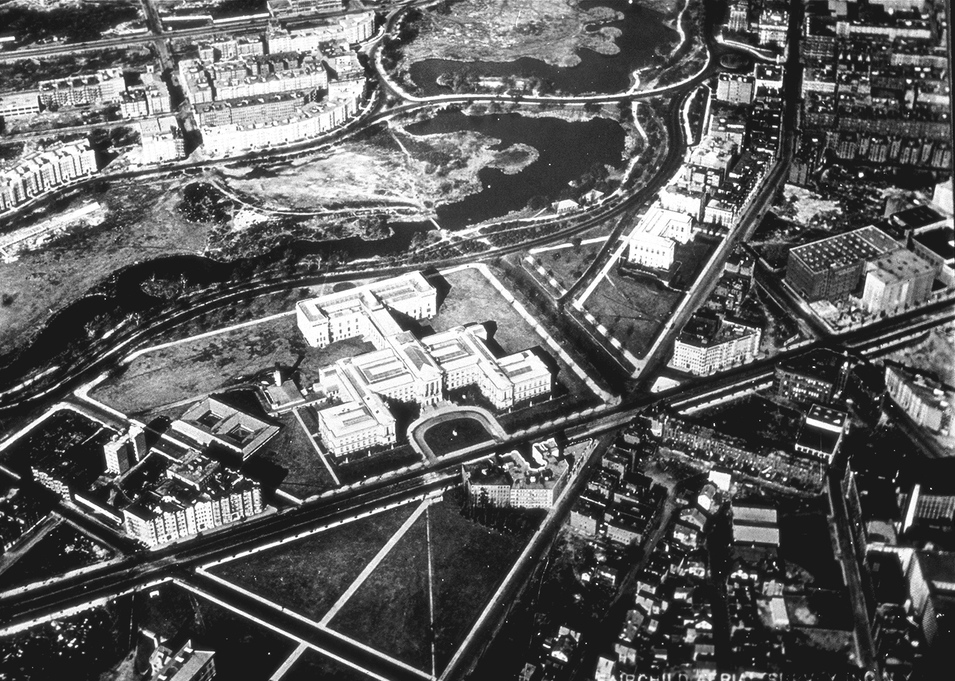
Aerial view of Huntington Avenue near the Museum of Fine Arts, c. 1920

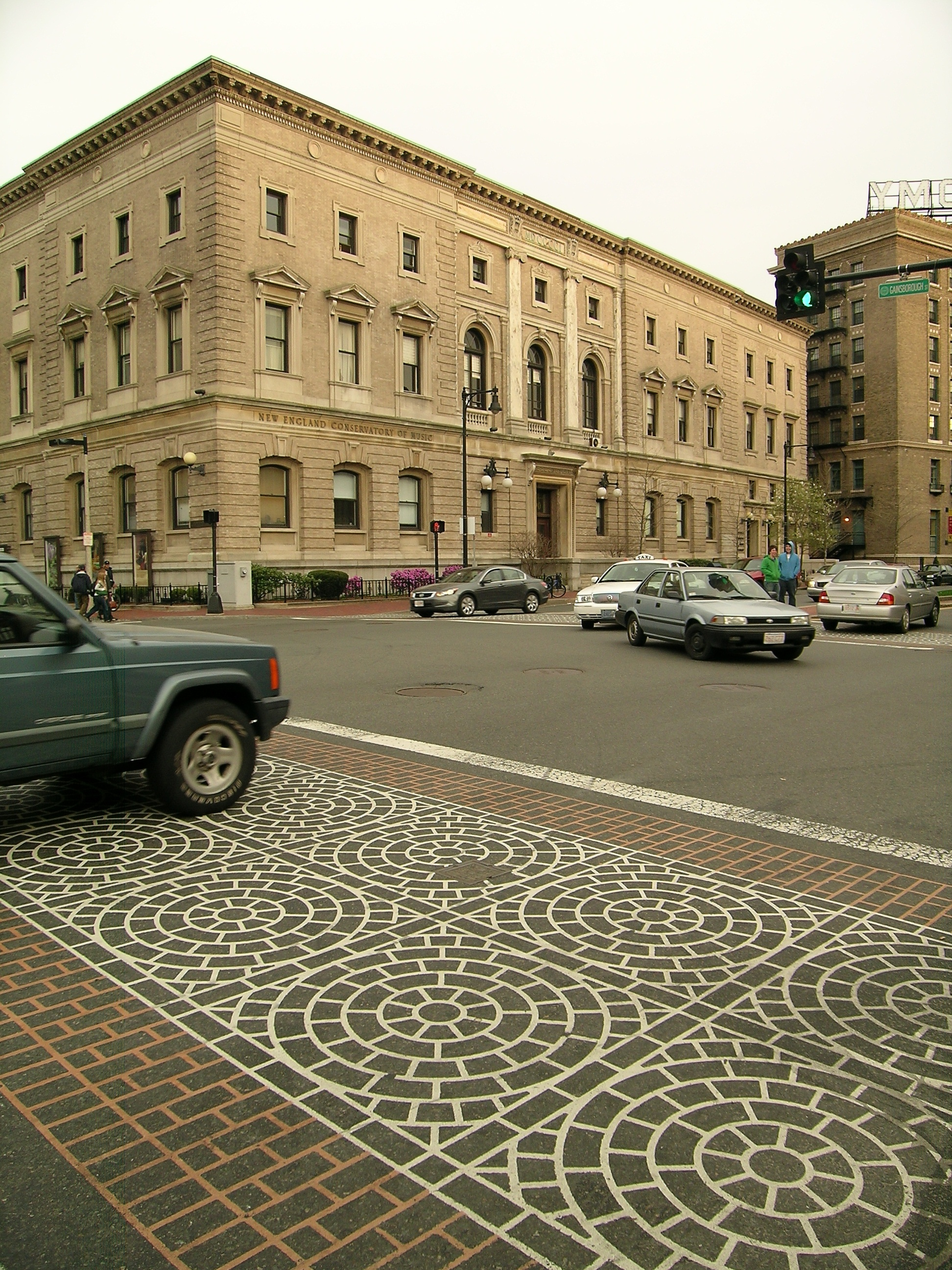
Pedestrian crossing at the New England Conservatory, 2008

== See also ==
- Back Bay, Boston
- Fenway-Kenmore
- Longwood Medical and Academic Area
- Massachusetts Route 9
- Mission Hill, Boston
