= Roxbury Conglomerate =

Rock formation in Massachusetts, United States

- Stratigraphic range: Ediacaran: 595–570 Ma
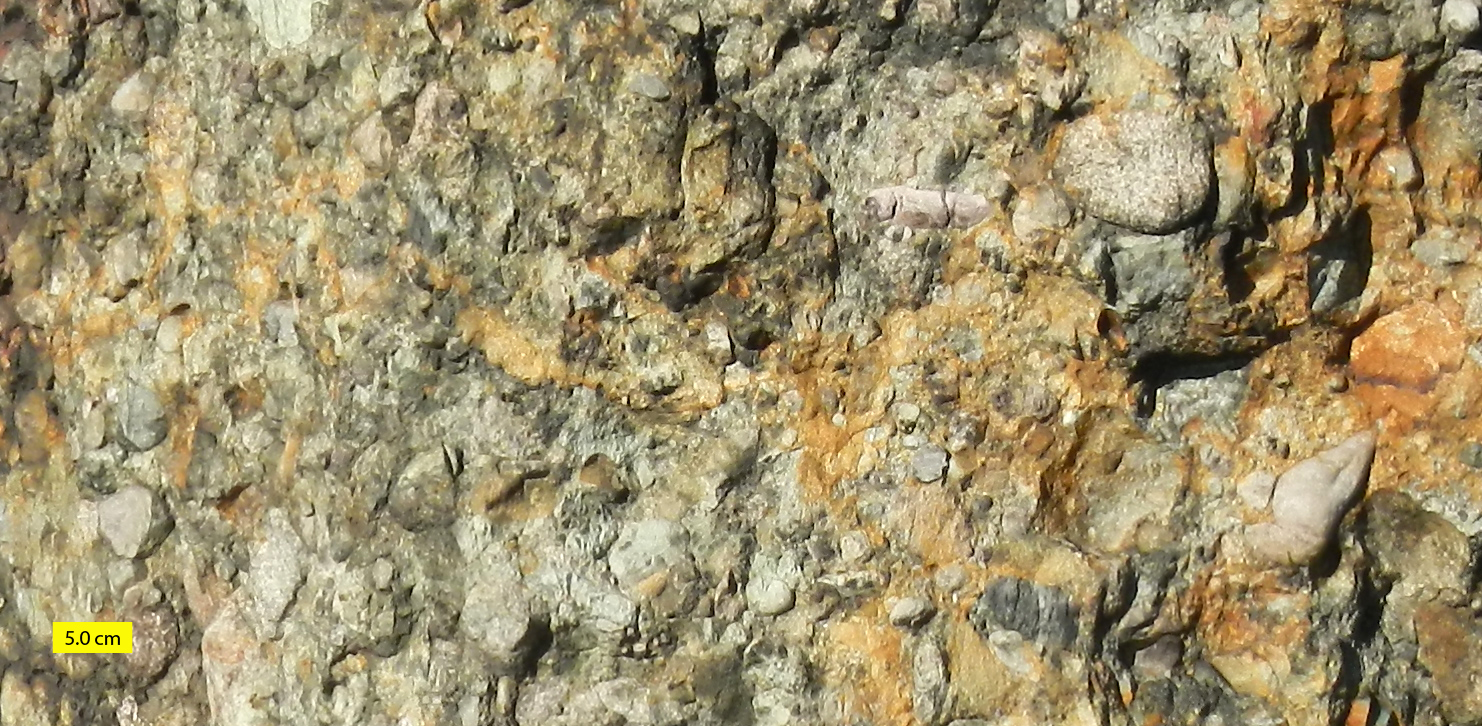
- Roxbury Conglomerate in a monument on the Gettysburg Battlefield
- Type: Geological formation
- Unit of: Boston Bay Group
- Sub-units: Brookline Member, Dorchester Member, and Squantum Member
- Underlies: Cambridge Argillite
- Overlies: Mattapan Volcanic Complex and Middlesex Fells Volcanic Complex
- Thickness: 1,310 meters (4,300 ft) approximate maximum

Lithology
- Primary: sandstone, conglomerate, and diamictite
- Other: argillite

Location
- Country: United States of America
- Extent: Boston Basin, eastern Massachusetts

Type section
- Named for: Roxbury, Massachusetts
- Named by: Hitchcock (1841) and Shaler (1869)

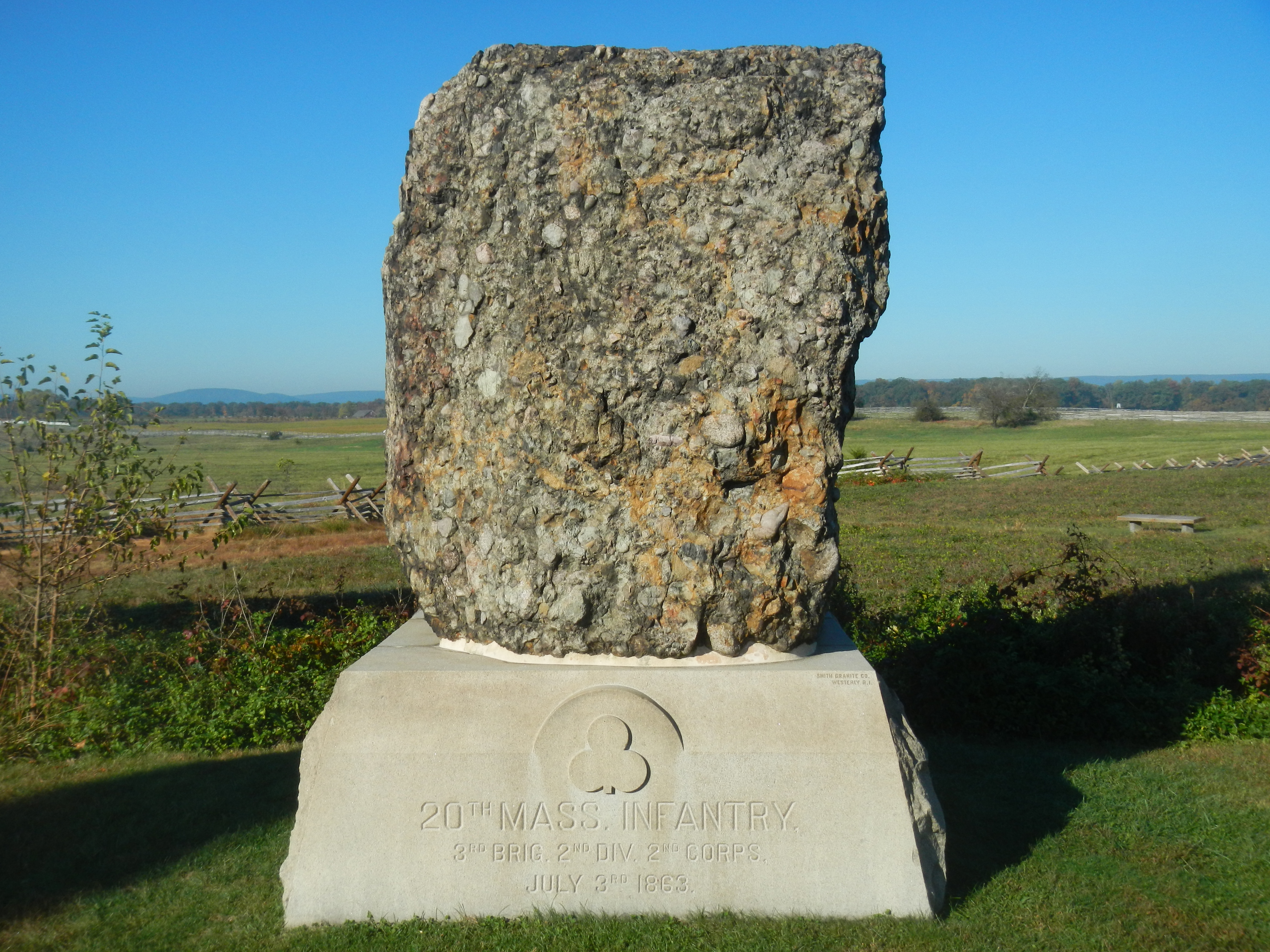
Monument to the 20th Massachusetts Infantry on the Gettysburg Battlefield made of Roxbury Conglomerate

The Roxbury Conglomerate, also informally known as Roxbury puddingstone, is a rock formation that forms the bedrock underlying most of Roxbury, Massachusetts, now part of the city of Boston. The bedrock formation extends well beyond the limits of Roxbury, underlying part or all of Quincy, Canton, Milton, Dorchester, Dedham, Jamaica Plain, Brighton, Brookline, Newton, Needham, and Dover. It is named for exposures in Roxbury, in the Boston area. It is the Rock of the Commonwealth in Massachusetts.

== Description ==
The Roxbury Conglomerate comprises the lower part of the Boston Bay Group, which is a 5,000-meter-thick (3 miles) sequence of sedimentary rocks that fill the Neoproterozoic Boston Basin in eastern Massachusetts. The upper part of the Boston Bay Group consists of the Cambridge Argillite, which overlies the Roxbury Conglomerate. The Roxbury Conglomerate traditionally has been subdivided into three subdivisions; (1.) basal Brookline Member (conglomerate and sandstone), (2.) medial Dorchester Member (mostly sandstone with minor conglomerate) and (3.) upper Squantum Member (largely diamictite). However, these three subdivisions of the Roxbury Conglomerate complexly interfinger with each other and lack the simple layer-cake distribution that past studies have described.

The Brookline Member of the Roxbury Conglomerate is the classic ‘puddingstone’ that is typically discussed and illustrated in popular web pages, articles, and other publications. It is about 150–1,300 m (490–4,300 ft) thick and consists of massive clast-supported pebble and cobble conglomerate beds interbedded with beds of argillite and sandstone. The conglomerates consist of grey feldspathic sand and well-rounded pebbles and cobbles of quartzite, granite, felsite, and quartz monzonite. The 'puddingstone' of the Brookline Member is complexly interbedded with layers of laminated and graded argillite and sandstone and massive diamictite.

The Dorchester Member consists of purplish, greenish and grey siltstone, sandstone, and medium-to fine-grained argillite. As traditionally defined, it is 180–500 m (590–1,600 ft) thick and dominated by medium-to fine-grained argillite. It contains lesser amounts of sandstone and conglomerate than the Brookline Member. The sandstone beds within this member commonly exhibit full or partial Bouma sequences. The beds within this member commonly exhibit evidence of penecontemporaneous deformation due to downslope slumping.

The well-known Squantum Member is also known as the Squantum diamictite, Squantum 'Tillite', Squantum Tillite, or the Squantum Tilloid. It consists largely of diamictites that are a heterogeneous and poorly sorted admixture of rare boulders up to 1.2 m in diameter, pebbles, cobbles, and sand in a silty-clay matrix. These diamictites occur as beds, which range in thickness from 18 to 215 m (60 to 705 ft) and are typically interbedded with purplish, greenish and grey siltstone, sandstone, and medium-to fine-grained argillite. Typically, the diamictites are mostly massive and lenticular in form; some are crude to moderately well sorted; and some exhibit normal grading. Most of the diamictite outcrops exhibit chaotic bedding in the form of contorted and folded patches of sand, local clusters of gravel, and coherent slump blocks of mudstone. In outcrops, lapilli tuff beds have also been identified in close association with the diamictite of the Squantum Member. At Squantum Head, the diamictite is interbedded with laminated mudstone beds that are 2 to 10 cm (0.8 to 4 in) thick. Some of laminated mudstone beds contain a few outsized pebbles or cobbles that have depressed the underlying laminae and giving them the appearance of dropstones.

The gravel-size portion of the Squantum Member diamictites consists of range from sub-rounded to angular clasts, 5–60 cm (2–24 in) in diameter, to well-rounded clasts 3–8 cm (1.1–3 in) in diameter. They are composed of multicoloured, locally derived felsic and mafic volcanic rocks, granodiorite, quartzite and massive, graded and laminated sandstone and siltstone. The sand- and gravel-sized fraction of the diamictites consist of volcanic, granitic and metasedimentary lithic fragments that have the same composition as the sediments of the Brookline and Dorchester members. Glacially striated pebbles, chattermarked quartz grains and dropstones have been reported from these diamictites. However, none of these reports have been substantiated by later research. For example, previously identified dropstones have been re-interpreted as having been emplaced by lateral sediment-gravity or current processes.

The Roxbury Conglomerate has been significantly altered by metamorphism. Metamorphism has altered its sedimentary rocks to subgreenschist facies and created a slaty, well-developed, spaced cleavage that oriented approximately perpendicular to bedding within it. Typically, tectonism has flattened, stretched, indented, and fractured the pebbles and associated matrix of the Roxbury Conglomerate to the point that it often has the appearance of flow structure.

== Nature of contacts ==
The strata of the Boston Bay Group lie within a faulted bounded basin. They are bounded by normal faults to the north and west. Within the Boston Basin, Roxbury Conglomerate lies unconformably upon Dedham Granite, Westwood Granite, and much older Middlesex Fells Volcanic Complex. To the south, the Roxbury Conglomerate unconformably overlies Mattapan Volcanic Complex, which, in turn, overlies the Dedham Granite. The Dedham Granite, Westwood Granite, and older rocks are overlain by the calc-alkaline Brighton Volcanic rocks, which consist of the altered basalt and andesite flows, pyroclastic rocks, breccia, tuff, and intrusive rocks. The upper part of the Brighton Volcanic rocks sporadically interfinger and interbedded with the Brookline and Dorchester members throughout the basin in the southern portion of the basin.

Overlying the Squantum Member, the Cambridge Argillite consists of up to 5 km (3 miles) of laminated, dark to olive grey, graded, turbiditic siltstone and sandstone beds. Graded beds, starved ripples, scour marks, load casts and micro-faults are numerous. Soft sediment deformation structures, such as mega slump folds many meters in amplitude, and pinch and swell bedding, are also common. Discrete ash beds measuring a few centimeters to tens of centimeters in thickness have also been documented in this unit.

== Depositional environment ==
A number of processes have been proposed for the deposition of the Roxbury Conglomerate. Initially, it was proposed that the Boston Basin was a nonmarine basin, in which rivers and mountain glaciers transported and deposited the sediments, which comprise the Roxbury Conglomerate. Further and more detailed examination of the sedimentology of rocks comprising it has shown that the Boston Basin was a deep marine basin in which the sediments comprising the Roxbury Conglomerate accumulated as deep sea fans as the result of non-glacial subaqueous mass flow and turbidity current deposition. This is consistent with the thick turbidites, which accumulated within a submarine fan or slope environment, of the overlying Cambridge Argillite. The volcanic and coarse character of the Boston Bay Group points to deposition associated with volcanic activity. Past identification of a glaciogenic origin for the Roxbury Conglomerate was based entirely on the identification of ‘dropstones’ and striated pebbles, which have not been substantiated by later and more detailed research.

== Fossils ==
The Roxbury Conglomerate is typically unfossiliferous. The only fossils which have been reported from it are 0.5–3.5 cm (0.2–1.4 in) in diameter raised ring structures found in outcrops at Hewitt's Cove and Slate Island and two dislocated stromatolite hemispheroids found in laminated mudstones at Squantum Head.

== Age ==
Based on radiometric dates from volcanic and plutonic rocks underlying it, igneous gravel it contains, from volcanic rocks, which interfinger with it, and fossils found in the overlying Cambridge Argillite, the Roxbury Conglomerate accumulated between 570 and 595 million years ago. The Roxbury Conglomerate is underlain by circa 610 Ma Dedham Granite and circa 599 Ma Westwood Granite. It also overlies circa 596 Ma Mattapan Volcanic Complex. The Roxbury Conglomerate interfingers with upper part of the Brighton Volcanic rocks (c. 580–650 Ma). It is overlain by the Cambridge Argillite, which contains autochthonous Ediacaran microfossils (Bavlinella cf. faveolata).

== Cultural and economic importance ==
In the 19th and early 20th centuries it was frequently used to construct walls and house foundations in the Boston area; some of the stone was quarried in Brighton and Newton, but the most extensive workings were those in Roxbury. The American poet Oliver Wendell Holmes wrote a poem called "The Dorchester Giant" in 1830, and referred to this special kind of stone, "Roxbury puddingstone", also quarried in Dorchester, which was used to build churches in the Boston area, most notably the Central Congregational Church (later called the Church of the Covenant) in Boston's Back Bay neighborhood.

Roxbury puddingstone is the official rock of Massachusetts.

Puddingstone Park is a neighborhood park built as part of the redevelopment of a former puddingstone quarry in the Mission Hill neighborhood of Boston.

== See also ==
- Hertfordshire puddingstone – Conglomerate sedimentary rock
- Puddingstone – Colorful conglomerate rock
