= Annunciation Greek Orthodox Cathedral of New England =

Historic church in Massachusetts, United States

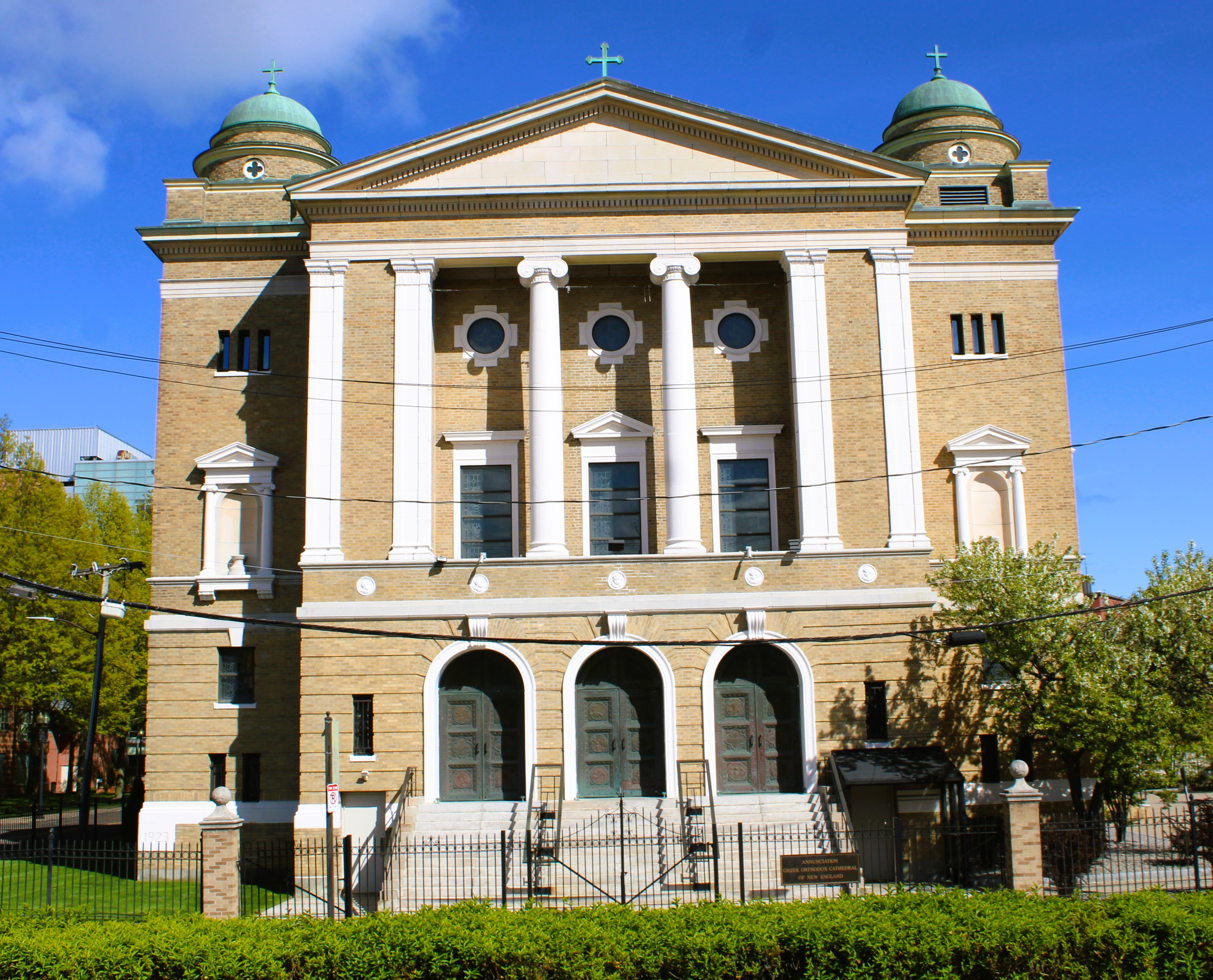
- Cathedral in 2024

- Location within Massachusetts Location within the United States
- 42°20′12″N 71°5′37″W
- Location: 514 Parker Street, Boston, Massachusetts
- Country: United States
- Denomination: Greek Orthodox
- Website: www.bostoncathedral.org/

Architecture
- Architect: Hachadoor Demoorjian
- Architectural type: Classical Revival
- Completed: 1923

Administration
- Metropolis: Boston
- Archdiocese: America
- Greek Orthodox Cathedral of New England
- U.S. National Register of Historic Places
- NRHP reference No.: 88000957
- Added to NRHP: June 30, 1988

The Annunciation Greek Orthodox Cathedral of New England is a historic Greek Orthodox church in Boston, Massachusetts that was added to the National Register of Historic Places as Greek Orthodox Cathedral of New England in 1988.

The congregation was established in Boston's South End with a church built for worship on Winchester Street by 1906. As attendance grew and Boston was designated as a diocese for the Greek Orthodox Church in 1923, the Hellenic Association of New England (as the congregation was legally known by), sought out space for a new cathedral to be the seat for its bishop and allow for space for continued growth. The corner of Ruggles Street and Parker Street in Roxbury was selected and the new church was built by 1923. The Classical Revival building was designed by Hachadoor Demoorjian; design work of its interior included consultation with architect Ralph Adams Cram.

The cathedral has been the seat of the Greek Orthodox Metropolis of Boston since the establishment of the Boston Diocese in 1923, and served as the headquarters of the metropolis until c. 1973, when its residence was moved to 162 Goddard Avenue, Brookline, Massachusetts.

== See also ==
- National Register of Historic Places listings in southern Boston, Massachusetts
- List of cathedrals in the United States
