= Methodios Tournas =

Greek Orthodox bishop of Boston

His Eminence Methodios
- Metropolitan of Boston
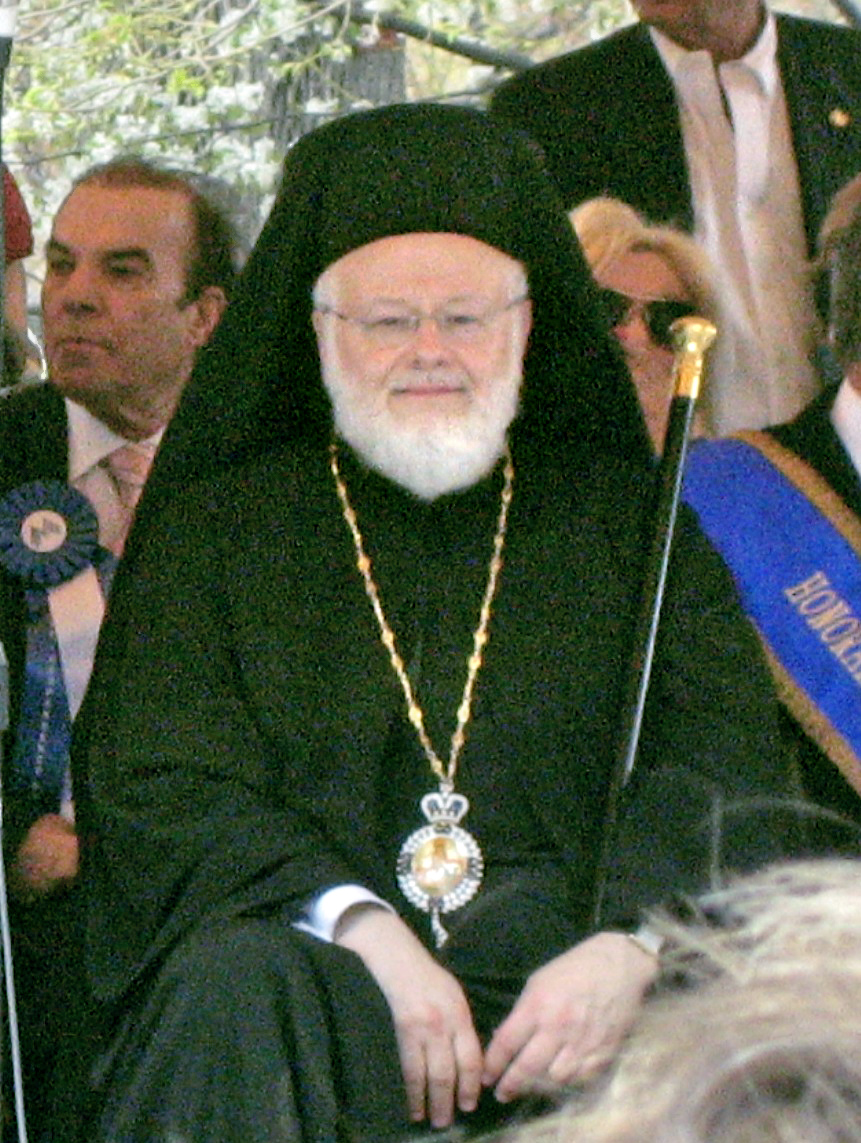
- Metropolitan Methodios at Boston's 2009 Greek Independence Day Parade.
- Archdiocese: America
- See: Boston
- Installed: April 8, 1984
- Term ended: Incumbent
- Predecessor: Bishop Anthimos

Orders
- Ordination: July 18, 1982

Personal details
- Born: George Tournas; November 19, 1946 (age 79) New York City, New York
- Denomination: Greek Orthodox
- Education: Hellenic College/Holy Cross; Boston University

Metropolitan Methodios of Boston (born George Tournas on November 19, 1946) is a metropolitan bishop and spiritual leader of the Greek Orthodox Metropolis of Boston. The Metropolis includes all of the U.S. states of Massachusetts, Maine, New Hampshire, Rhode Island, and Vermont, as well as the Connecticut towns of Danielson, New London and Norwich. The Metropolis, which has its offices in Brookline, Massachusetts, consists of 63 parishes which minister to the needs of approximately 230,000 Greek Orthodox Christians.

Methodios was enthroned as Bishop of Boston on April 8, 1984, and was elevated to a Metropolitan in 1997. During his tenure, he founded the Philoxenia House and also oversaw the purchase and building of the St. Methodios Faith and Heritage Center in Contoocook, New Hampshire. On May 11, 2019, he was appointed to serve as the acting Archbishop of the Greek Orthodox Archdiocese of America before the new archbishop was enthroned on June 22, 2019.

== Early life and education ==
Methodios was born George Tournas on November 19, 1946, in New York City, New York, and was the third child of Stavroula and Vasilios Tournas. He graduated from the Greek Orthodox Cathedral Parochial School in New York City and the McBurney School in Manhattan. Methodios received the Bachelor of Arts degree from Hellenic College in Brookline in 1968 and the Bachelor of Divinity Degree from Holy Cross Greek Orthodox School of Theology in 1971. In 1972 he earned the Master of Sacred Theology from Boston University and in 1975 the University of Thessaloniki, awarded him Theological Accreditation upon completion of further studies there. Boston University awarded Methodios the Honorary Doctor of Divinity Degree in May 1985. In June 1995 the American International College in Springfield, Massachusetts, awarded Methodios the Honorary Degree of Humane Letters. His alma mater, Hellenic College-Holy Cross, awarded him an Honorary Doctor of Divinity Degree on May 19, 2001.

== Episcopacy ==
In the early 1980s, Methodios served as a member of the National Orthodox-Roman Catholic Consultations Board. As a member of the Appeal of Conscience Foundation, an Organization devoted to the cause of worldwide religious freedom for all denominations, Metropolitan Methodios traveled to Hungary in 1981, and, in the fall of 1982 he was a member of a three-man religious delegation that visited the Soviet Union. A second visit to the Soviet Union was made in September 1984. Metropolitan Methodios is a member of the Holy Synod of the Greek Orthodox Church in the United States, served on the executive board of the National Council of Churches and is a member of the Massachusetts Commission on Christian Unity and the New England Consultation of Church Leaders. He is listed in Who is Who in Religion, is a member of the Standing Conference of Canonical Orthodox Bishops in the Americas and serves on various other religious boards and organizations.

Methodios was enthroned as the Bishop of Boston on April 8, 1984, following his election to that post by the Holy Synod of the Ecumenical Patriarchate in Phanar, Constantinople, Turkey. In July 1989, Bishop Methodios assumed the presidency of Hellenic College and Holy Cross Greek Orthodox School of Theology in Brookline, Massachusetts, a position he held until 1995. In November 1997, the Holy Synod of the Ecumenical Patriarchate elevated Bishop Methodios to the office of Metropolitan along with the other bishops of the Archdiocese of America. His see, however, remained a diocese until December 2002.

As Metropolitan, Methodios encouraged the Metropolis of Boston to support him in the construction of a community center and offices located at 162 Goddard Avenue in Brookline. Groundbreaking for the project took place on September 14, 1985. It was completed a year later, on September 14, 1986. From this center, which serves as the headquarters of the Metropolis, many programs emanate which serve and enlighten the faithful and share Orthodoxy with the public-at-large. These programs include the Marriage Preparation Seminars, instituted by Metropolitan Methodios in 1987, for all couples who are getting married in the Greek Orthodox Metropolis of Boston.

In 1986 Metropolitan Methodios established the Philoxenia House which offers hospitality to patients and those who accompany them who come to Boston for medical reasons and cannot afford to stay in hotels. Guests to the Philoxenia House have come from Greece, Cyprus, South America, South Africa, Egypt, Russia, Yugoslavia, Bulgaria and from throughout the United States. Metropolitan Methodios is assisted by the Philoptochos Women and the faithful throughout the Metropolis in this ministry.

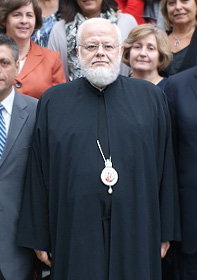
Metropolitan Methodios (2012)

In the summer of 1998, the Diocese of Boston acquired Camp Merrimac in Contoocook, New Hampshire, a large former summer camp which became the St. Methodios Faith and Heritage Center, offering programs for youth and families.

The Bishop, who walks at the annual Walk for Hunger sponsored by Project Bread, is a frequent visitor to area soup kitchens where he serves food to those who are in need. For his "unique contribution in the crusade against hunger and homelessness," Metropolitan Methodios has been honored by the Quincy Community Action Organization Inc, in Quincy, Massachusetts. He has also been awarded the "Good Neighbor" Award by the Mishkan Tefila Brotherhood in Chestnut Hill.

In late July 2017, Methodios gained local media attention after firing longtime priest Father Nicholas Kastanas of the St Athanasius the Great Greek Orthodox Church in Arlington, Massachusetts. While no specific reasons were stated in his letter to the community, Methodios cited "turmoil" for which Kastanas "bears the greatest responsibility". Following the notice of firing, the community banded together, creating a petition in the hope of reversing Methodios's decision and packed the church for the priest's last service as a show of solidarity. It was later reported that the cause of the dismissal was Kastanas's failure to "preserve the orderly life and unity of the parish" as he was reportedly unable to control growing disputes between the Parish Council and a group of parishioners. On November 17, 2017, the Metropolis published "A Message from the Greek Orthodox Metropolis of Boston Concerning St. Athanasius the Great of Arlington, MA" that included "Frequently Asked Questions" and an accompanying "Timeline of Events," documents which detailed the events leading up to Father Kastanas' removal from his pastoral duties in Arlington.

Following the resignation of Archbishop Demetrios, on May 19, 2019, Methodios was appointed to serve as the Archiepiscopal Vicar and served in this position until Archbishop Elpidophoros was enthroned on June 22, 2019.

On October 8, 2020, the Ecumenical Patriarchate announced that Metropolitan Methodios was suspended from his duties until Christmas 2020 on account of "canonical transgressions". The announcement followed an extensive examination of issues concerning the Archdiocese of America and reports from Archbishop Elpidophoros. Related news articles reported that in September 2020, the Attorney General of New Hampshire had warned Methodios concerning protective measures for COVID-19. Similarly he was found to have not followed COVID-19-related instructions from Archbishop Elpidophoros.

== See also ==
- Greek Orthodox Metropolis of Boston
- Greek Orthodox Archdiocese of America
- Ecumenical Patriarchate of Constantinople
