= Walk for Hunger =

The logo of the 2011 Walk for Hunger

Project Bread's Walk for Hunger is the oldest continual pledge walk in the United States and the largest annual one-day fundraiser to alleviate local hunger in Massachusetts.

== Project Bread - The Walk for Hunger ==
Project Bread is an antihunger organization creating and promoting programs to help end hunger in Massachusetts. With the Chefs in Schools Initiative, the organization is changing school food. The Initiative is a joint effort with Project Bread and the City of Boston to change what kids eat in the school cafeteria. First piloted in the Boston Public Schools, the "Chef in Resident," Chef Kirk Conrad, is now working in Lawrence and Salem School districts.

The Child Nutrition Outreach Program at Project Bread has partnered with the U.S. Department of Agriculture to promote participation the Summer Food Service Program and the National School Breakfast Program, both federally funded programs. Making sure kids don’t go hungry when they're not in school, sites around the state allow low-income children the opportunity for free or reduced priced meals.

According to Project Bread's 2010 status report, 660,000 people in Massachusetts are hungry. Project Bread is trying to eliminate the number of food insecure people with the FoodSource Hotline, where people can find out how to get the help they need. Project Bread has also created an easy website to help residents apply for food stamps.

Boston Red Sox player Jacoby Ellsbury came out with "ZinfandEllsbury" Wine in 2010, with proceeds benefitting Project Bread.

== History ==
The logo of the 2009 Walk for Hunger

The first Walk was held in 1969 by a group of activists from the Paulist Center, led by Patrick Hughes. An estimated 2,000 people walked and raised $26,000 to help fund two hunger projects. At the 2009 Walk for Hunger, 44,000 people came to the Boston Common to raise millions for the hungry. The 20-mile pledge Walk attracted over 1,000 religious organizations, as well as 1,200 corporate teams, 1,200 schools, 2,000 volunteers, and 700 friends and family groups who all came together to help feed hungry people in Massachusetts.

The 20-mile Walk occurs annually on the first Sunday in May and weaves through Boston, Brookline, Newton, Watertown and Cambridge, and includes entertainment and free snacks along the way. The 45th annual Walk for Hunger took place on Sunday, May 5, 2013. In 2016 the course was shortened from 20 miles to 10 due to cost and security concerns.

In 2020 and 2021, the Walk was converted to a "virtual" event because of the COVID-19 pandemic. The walk returned in 2023 with a further shortened 3 mile loop. The shorter route was selected citing accessibility and improving fundraising efficiency.

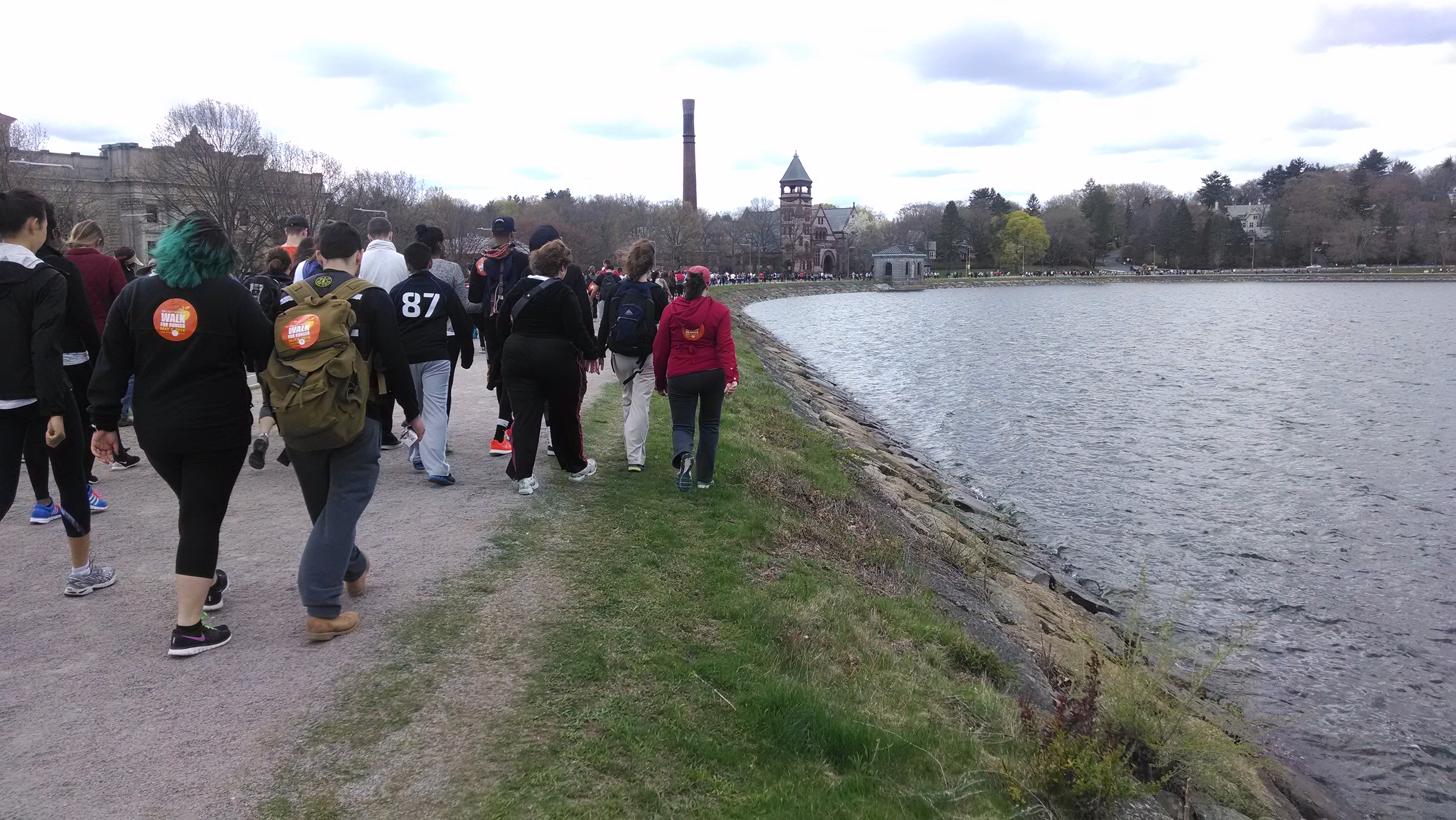
Walkers at Chestnut Hill Reservoir in 2014

== Heart & Sole Walkers and Volunteers ==
Unlike regular Walkers, The Heart & Sole Walkers must raise at least $500 to become part of the Heart & Sole Circle. The group raises more than $1 million to help hungry people annually. These special Walkers are between the ages of 9 and 90. Their help is what makes it possible to raise one third of the money given to help the hungry. Special T-shirts are given to these individuals.

Volunteers at the Walk help assist Walkers. At each checkpoint, volunteers help check off mile sheets, hand out cold water, assist Walkers by helping them cross the streets safely and motivating the participants.
