= Greek Orthodox Metropolis of Boston =

Ecclesiastical territory of the Greek Orthodox Church

Coordinates: 42°20′11.87″N 71°5′36.61″W

Greek Orthodox Metropolises
Metropolis of Boston

Personnel
| Metropolitan | Methodios (Tournas) |
| Cathedral | Annunciation Greek Orthodox Cathedral of New England |

Geography
| Location | New England, United States |

Vital Statistics
| Total Parishes | 63 |
| Total Orthodox Population | 230,000 |
| Total Population | 14,239,724 |
- Website: boston.goarch.org

The Greek Orthodox Metropolis of Boston (formerly the Greek Orthodox Diocese of Boston) is an ecclesiastical territory or metropolis of the Greek Orthodox Church in the New England region of the United States. It is led by a metropolitan bishop and is part of the Archdiocese of America which itself is under the control of the Ecumenical Patriarchate of Constantinople.

On December 20, 2002, the territory was elevated from diocese to metropolis status, although its leader had been elevated to the role of metropolitan six years earlier in November 1997. The Annunciation Cathedral in the City of Boston serves as the head church, with metropolitan offices located in Brookline, Massachusetts alongside Hellenic College and Holy Cross. Metropolitan Methodios has led the territory since his enthronement as Bishop of Boston on April 8, 1984, following his election to that post by the Holy Synod of the Ecumenical Patriarchate in Phanar, Constantinople, Turkey. In early October 2020 Metropolitan Methodios was suspended by the Holy Synod of the Ecumenical Patriarchate until Christmas for reasons undisclosed.

The Metropolis operates the St. Methodios Faith and Heritage Center in New Hampshire, which offers camping and spiritual retreats for families and individuals.

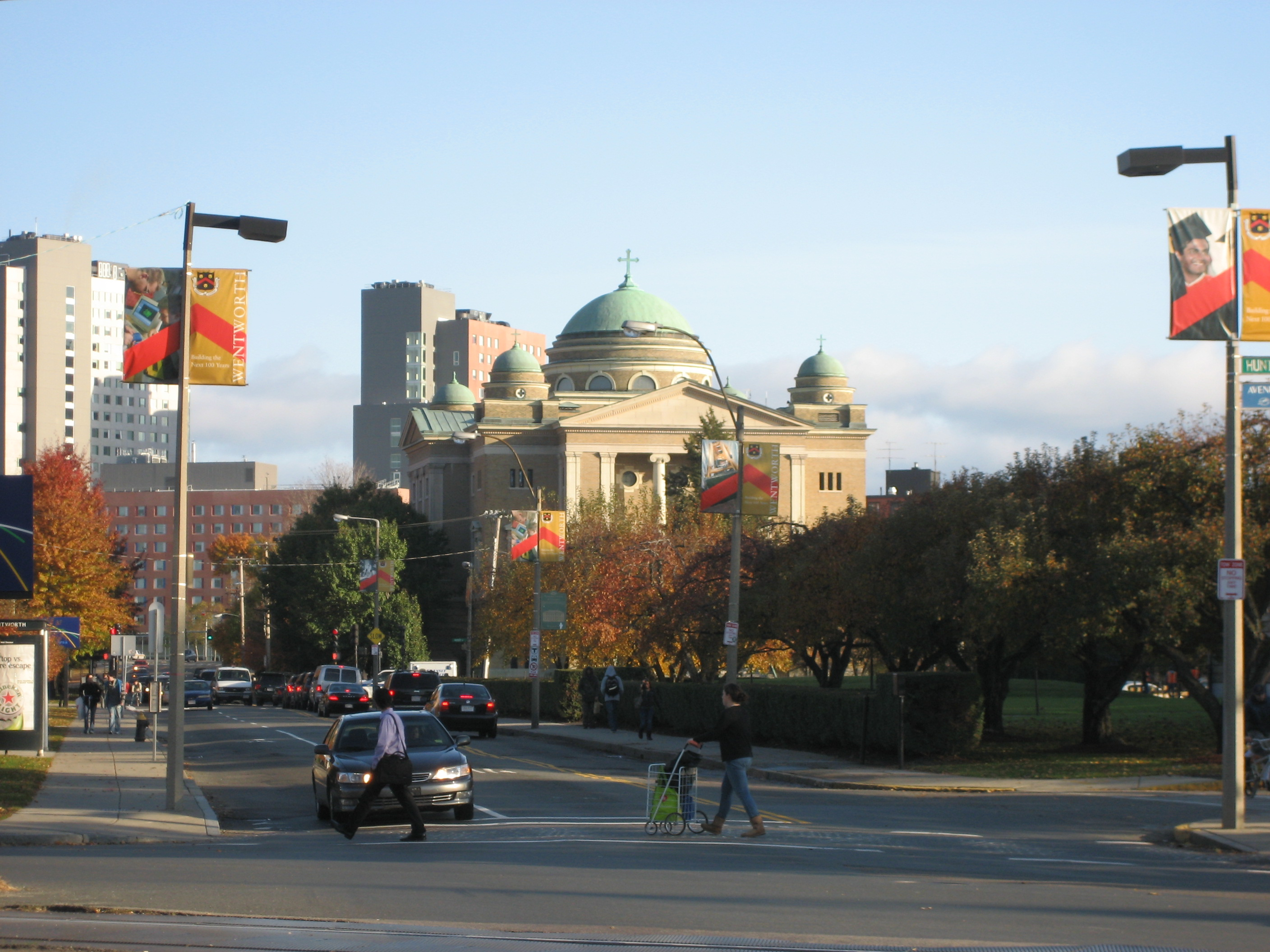
Annunciation Cathedral of New England in Boston.

== Bishops and Metropolitans of Boston ==
- 1923–1930: Bishop Ioakim (Alexopoulos) of Boston
- 1938–1949: Bishop Athenagoras (Kavadas) of Boston
- 1950–1954: Bishop Ezekiel (Tsoukalas) of Nazianzus
- 1954–1960: Bishop Athenagoras (Kokkinakis) of Elias
- 1961–1962: Bishop Meletios (Tripodakis) of Christianoupolis
- 1962–1967: Bishop Gerasimos (Papadopoulos) of Abydos
- 1968–1973: Bishop Demetrios (Makris) of Olympus
- 1974–1978: Bishop Iakovos (Garmatis) of Apameia
- 1979–1983: Bishop Anthimos (Drakonakis) of Boston
- 1984–present: Metropolitan Methodios (Tournas) of Boston
