= St. Methodios Faith and Heritage Center =

- Interactive map of St. Methodios Faith and Heritage Center
- Location: 329 Camp Merrimac Road; Contoocook, New Hampshire 03229
- Coordinates: 43°12′53″N 71°46′12″W
- Type: Camp, retreat center
- Operated by: Greek Orthodox Metropolis of Boston
- Website: www.saintmethodios.org www.metropolisofbostoncamp.org

The St. Methodios Faith and Heritage Center is a 223-acre (90 ha) camp run by the Greek Orthodox Metropolis of Boston and located in the town of Contoocook near the town of Hopkinton, New Hampshire. The site occupies the former village of Cloughville and had previously been home to Camp Merrimac.

== Programs and uses ==
The center is home to the Metropolis of Boston Camp, a coed program that holds five one–week summer sessions, two weekend winter sessions, and other programs throughout the year. The camp serves children from the ages of 8–18, and each year attracts approximately 500 campers and 50 staff members, with the capacity of up to 160 campers per week. Formerly known by the name Boston Diocese Camp, the program's name was changed with the diocese's elevation to a metropolis in late 2002. By 2011, the summer camp attracted close to 800 attendees, growing considerably from the 200 that it used to accommodate in the early years.

Besides being the home of the Metropolis's summer and winter camps, the Faith and Heritage Center also allows Orthodox parishes to hold weekend retreats for youth and families and each September, the Metropolis sponsors an open house which coincides with the celebration of the Feast of the Cross when the blessing of the waters service takes place. During this service Metropolitan Methodios throws the cross into the lake and campers dive to retrieve it. Also holding programs at the camp are Hellenic College-Holy Cross, the Orthodox Church in America, the Antiochian Orthodox Christian Archdiocese and the Armenian Apostolic Church, while the Roman Catholic Church, the United Church of Christ, and the New Hampshire Council of Churches have used the facility for retreats and gatherings in addition to many community organizations and schools.

== History ==
=== Camp Merrimac ===
The property that is now St. Methodios Faith and Heritage Center was a community known as "Cloughville" in the 19th century. In 1919, the patriarchs of the Clough family, Joseph and Sylvia Clough, died, and the property was sold to Mr. Price and Mr. Pick of New York, who established Camp Merrimac, a summer camp for Jewish boys, on the site. The first campers arrived in 1921. The camp was in a scenic location at the end of a dirt road on a lake officially known as Clement Pond, but known to generations of Merrimac campers as Lake Josylvia. Several of the old Cloughville buildings survived the transition—the local post office became the camp office. The ice house was the head counselor's shack. The village hall housed the mature staff, and a 19th-century barn lasted until it fell down one winter about 1960.

Mr. Price and Mr. Pick ran Camp Merrimac until the late 1940s when it was purchased by Abe Beleson, a teacher at the Bronx High School of Science. In 1953, Maury Bleifeld became a part owner, and in 1954 Harry Levine bought a share of the camp. In 1957, Werner Rothschild, Robert "Bob" Bomze, and Fred Egre purchased the property.

In 1958, Egre was bought out while Rothchild and Bomze continued operating the camp. Keeping the name Camp Merrimac, they continued to run a general summer camp program. One innovation they introduced in the 1960s was to have counselors from England, Sweden, and other European countries. In addition, being physical education teachers, they began the New England Hockey Camp and New England Figure Skating Camp. Youth would travel by bus to Concord, New Hampshire, to the Everett Arena for ice time.

Both boys and girls attended the camp from after World War II until 1998. The majority of campers came from the New York metropolitan area at first. From the late 1980s until the end campers came from all over the United States, plus Canada, Mexico and Europe.

Nearing retirement, and perhaps a bit exhausted after 40+ summers at camp, Mr. Rothschild and Mr. Martin (as Bomze was then known) were ready to sell. They wanted the property to remain a youth facility. They were searching for a buyer who would continue youth programs. In September 1998, the camp was sold to the Greek Orthodox Metropolis of Boston.

=== St. Methodios Faith and Heritage Center ===
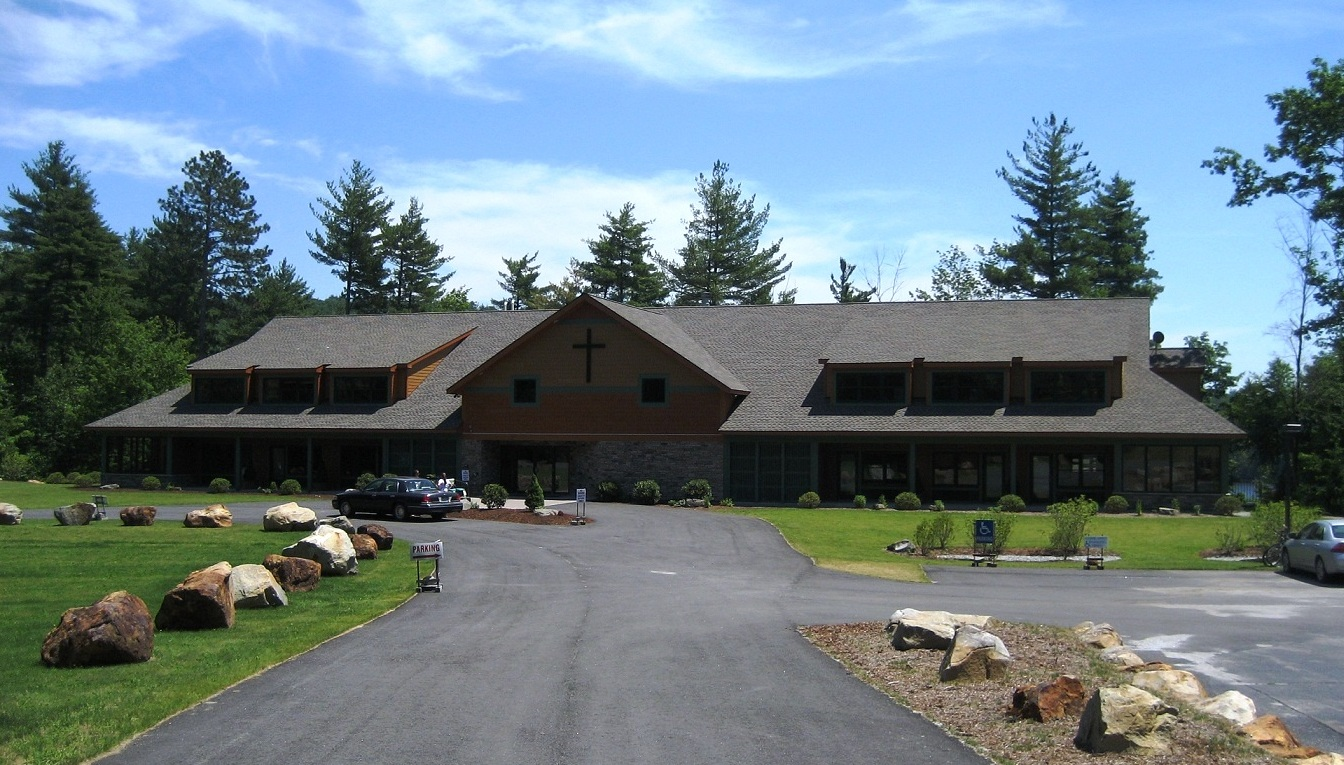
The completed Retreat House as seen in summer 2010

The Greek Orthodox Metropolis of Boston established a youth camp program in 1990. After years of using other area camp grounds around New England to support the growing community, the Metropolis decided to buy its own campground. The former 191-acre (77 ha) Camp Merrimac property was purchased with the help of a $500,000 donation by former pharmaceutical company owner George D. Behrakis in the summer of 1998.

Regular camp sessions began at the site in 1999, along with an ambitious program to winterize, improve, and expand the campground. As part of this modernization program, new water and waste water systems were designed and installed, the cafeteria was renovated, adding a new kitchen, and the rec hall was remodeled. The former barn was extended and a bell tower added to create a 200-seat chapel and all of the cabins on the eastern side of the camp were rebuilt over a ten-year period.

In 2006, Metropolitan Methodios and the Camp and Retreat Center Committee drafted plans for a new lodge on the shore of Clement Pond which would consist of 30 rooms with private accommodations for families, couples, individuals, clergy and laity. The plan was met with criticism from area property owners who felt that the new building would bring "noise, traffic and lighting [that] will destroy the place they go to get away", but it was ultimately approved by the Hopkinton Zoning Board of Adjustment in 2007. After the New Hampshire Supreme Court upheld the decision of the Hopkinton Zoning Board, construction began in the summer of 2008.

There are a multitude of structures on the property, including the St. George Chapel, an infirmary, a main office, several cabins, a dining hall, and a boat house. There are also two basketball courts, a soccer field, a volleyball pit, and a small beach on the lake. An indoor gymnasium is currently under construction.
