= Kevin W. Fitzgerald Park =

Park in Massachusetts, United States

Coordinates: 42°19′56.34″N 71°06′10.40″W

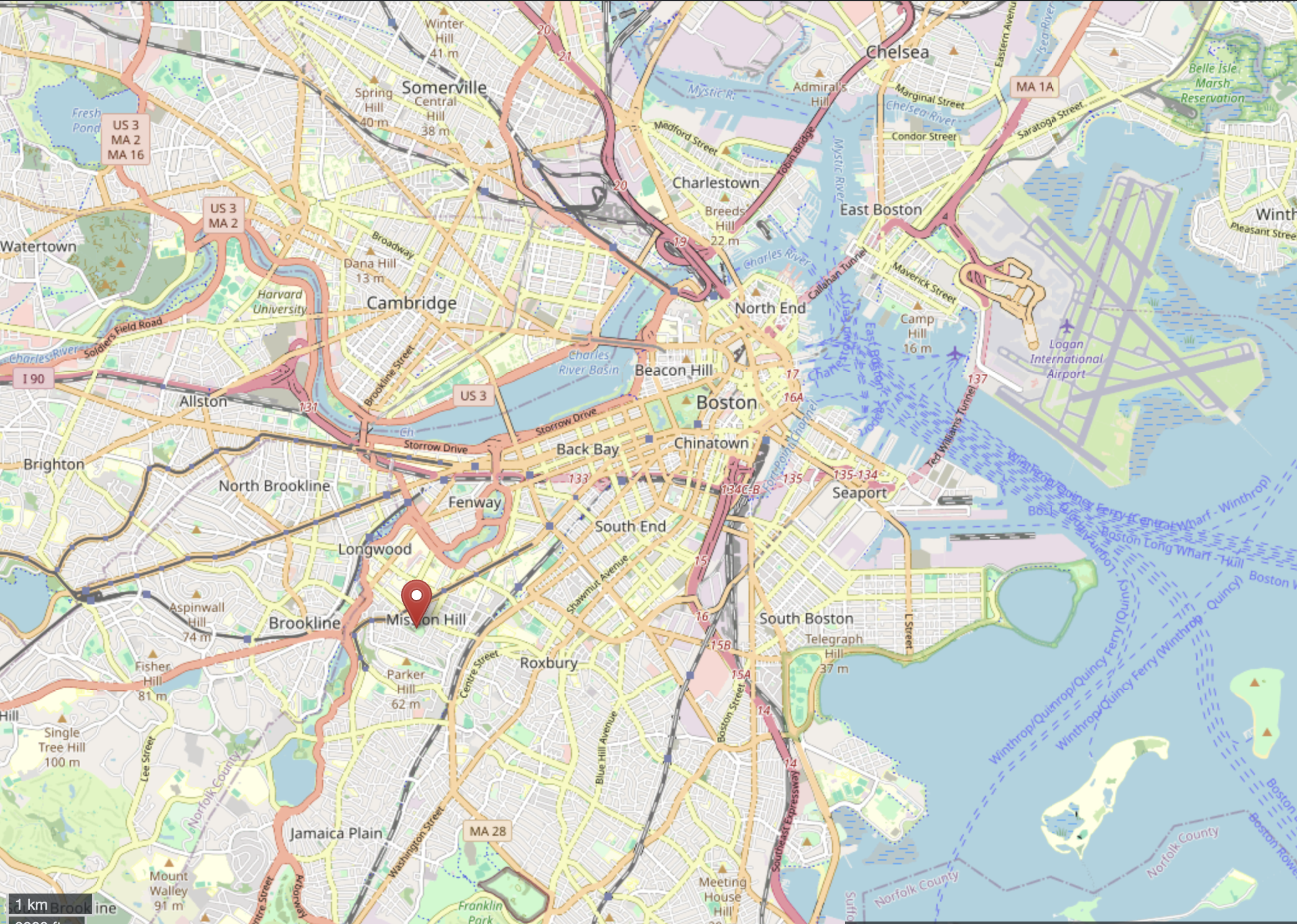
Location in Greater Boston Area

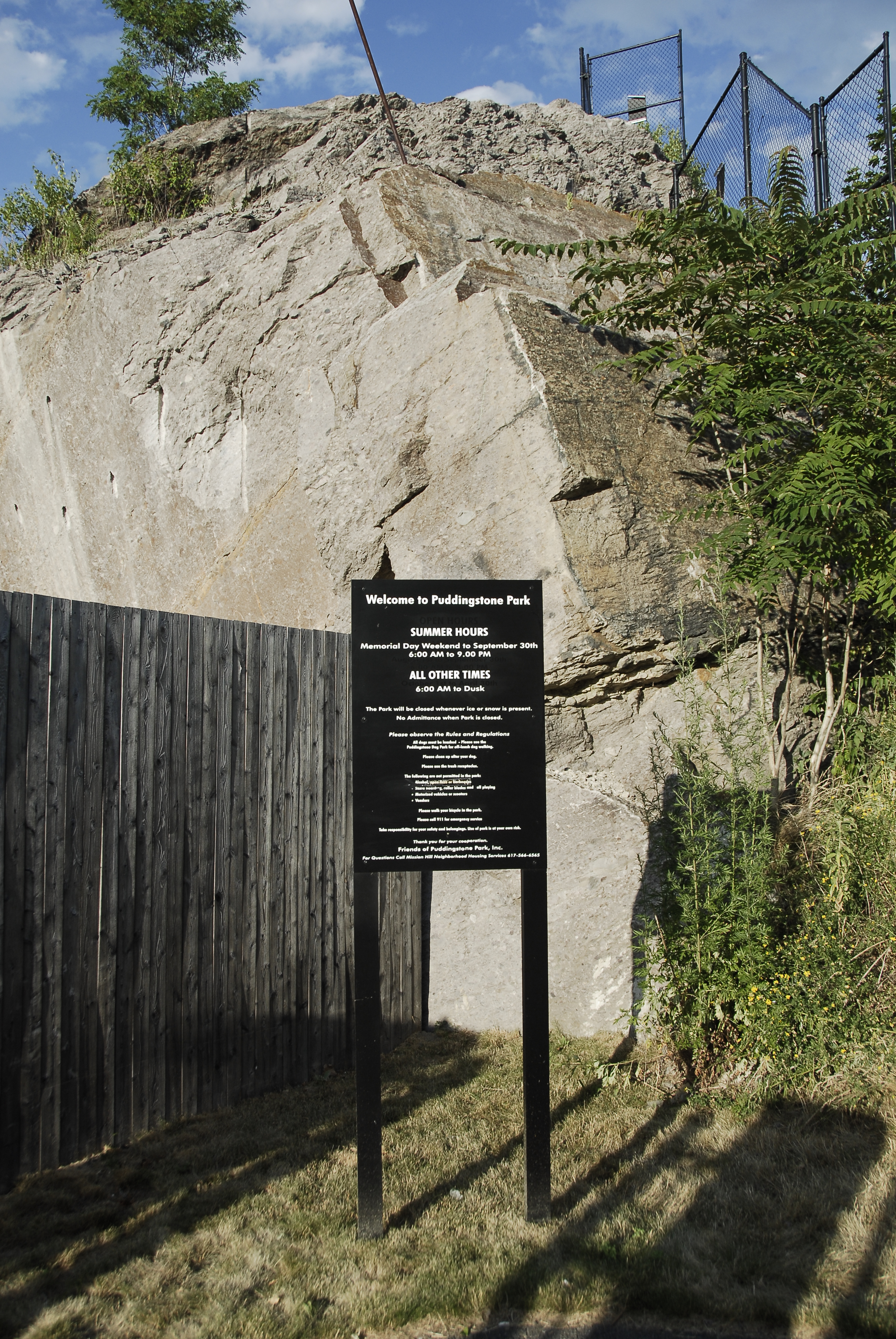
Welcome Sign

Kevin W. Fitzgerald Park (formerly Puddingstone Park) is a 5.5-acre (22,000 m^{2}) neighborhood park near Brigham Circle in the Mission Hill neighborhood of Boston, Massachusetts. It was built as part of the redevelopment of the "ledge site", a former Puddingstone quarry. It is accessible from a stairway from a nearby parking lot, with a winding pathway leading upwards to a view of greater Boston.

Initially called Puddingstone Park, the park was renamed on November 18, 2006 in honor of Kevin W. Fitzgerald, a state representative for 27 years, a youth advocate, and cofounder of the Center for the Study of Sport in Society at nearby Northeastern University. It borders Brigham Circle below, the traffic intersection and a commercial development by the same name, Mission Hill Neighborhood Housing Services (which had engaged neighboring institutions, government, and others for funding for the development), and some administrative offices for the Brigham and Women's Hospital.

== Annual Road Race ==
The annual 5K Mission Hill Road Race route begins and concludes at the park with a community celebration including music and food. The organization with the largest number of registered participants receives the "Pudding Pot" prize, awarded at the end of the race. Proceed from the Mission Hill Road Race have funded a variety of projects and events focused on the improvement of the park, such as the addition of surveillance cameras, concert events, and a program to introduce bee hives.
