= Melnea Cass Boulevard =

Street in Boston, Massachusetts

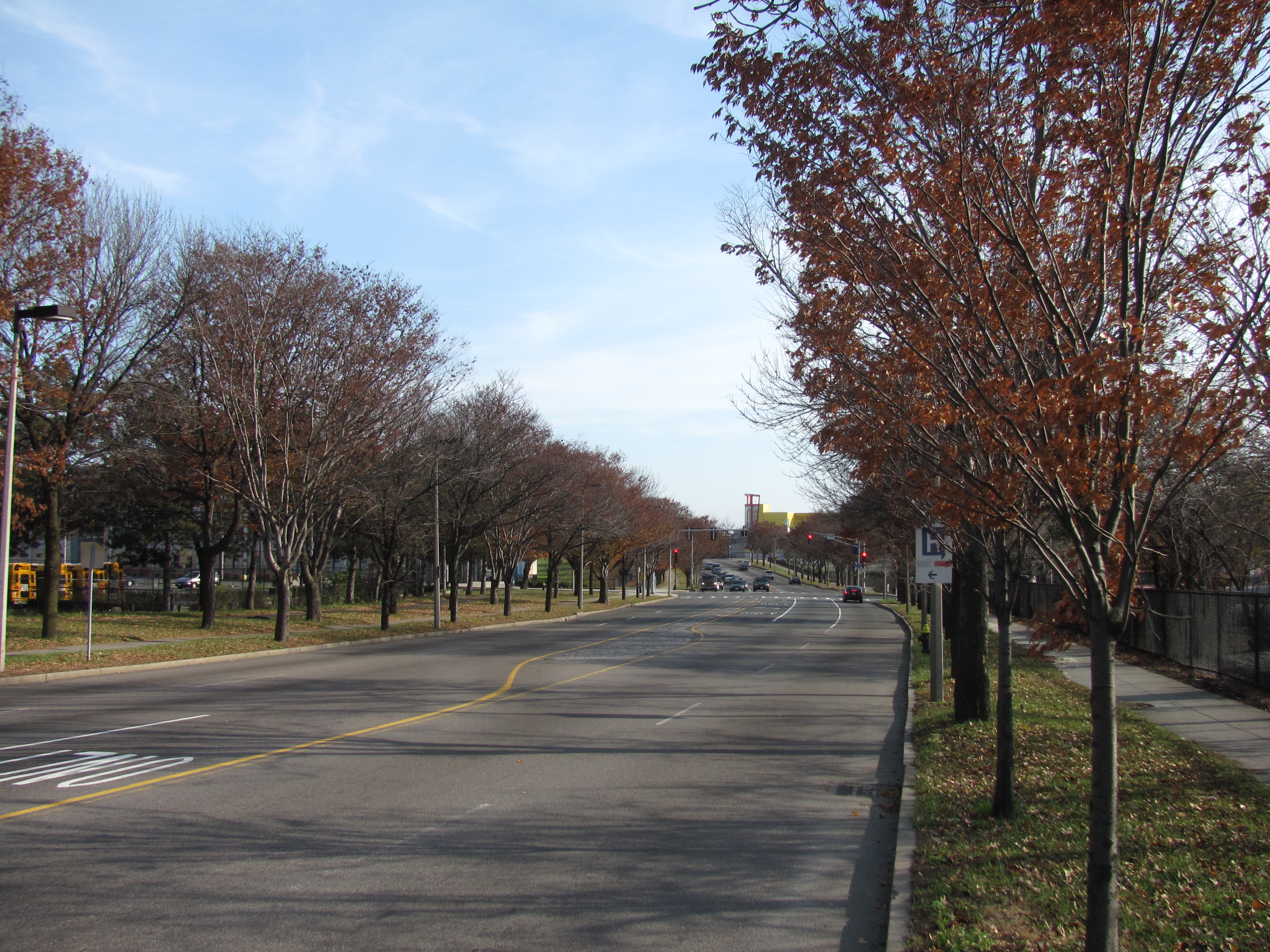
- Melnea Cass Boulevard at Washington Street
- Interactive map of Melnea Cass Boulevard
- Location: Boston
- West end: Route 28
- East end: Massachusetts Avenue

Melnea Cass Boulevard is a major street in Boston, Massachusetts, connecting Nubian Square in Roxbury to the South End. Named after prominent community and civil rights activist Melnea Cass, the boulevard has historical roots as part of the proposed—but ultimately canceled—Interstate 695 (the Inner Belt). There is also an MBTA Silver Line station named Melnea Cass Boulevard on this street.

The boulevard begins at its eastern terminus at the Mass Ave Connector and continues westward, intersecting several major thoroughfares in Roxbury, as well as a few smaller streets. It concludes at its western terminus near Columbus Avenue, behind Ruggles station and Northeastern University.

Melnea Cass Boulevard is primarily a four-lane road, with additional turning lanes at key intersections. Its history as a planned right-of-way for the Inner Belt contributes to its unique character: it is largely devoid of buildings, except for a few city-owned properties built on previously vacant lots. Most structures along the route are concentrated at the intersections with major cross streets.

== Cancelled planned renovation ==
The City of Boston began planning a complete rebuild of the street in 2011, publishing a plan in 2018 that would add separated bike lanes and raised crossings to improve safety on one of the city's most dangerous streets. It canceled the awarded $25.6 million contract for this rebuilding in January 2021 due to the objections of local residents over the removal of mature trees.

== Drug and homelessness issues ==
Due to its concentration of service providers, the area around the "Mass and Cass" intersection has attracted a large number of people dealing with homelessness and drug addiction, especially after the closure of the treatment facility on Long Island. The effects on local residents and the city's attempts to deal with the problem have generated considerable controversy, with the reconstruction of the bridge to Long Island delayed by opposition from the city of Quincy.

As of September 2021, there is a homeless community in the Melnea Cass Boulevard area, which has an area nicknamed "Methadone Mile" (after the opiate based drug used for treating opiate and opioid/heroin addiction). There were estimated to be over 100 residents in one concentration, mainly living in tents and structures.

It was referenced by Fergie the Florist in the 2010 film The Town as being the location where Doug MacRay's mother took her own life while under the influence of drugs.

== See also ==
- Combat Zone
- Skid row
