= Walnut Park Historic District (Boston, Massachusetts) =

Historic district in Massachusetts, United States

- U.S. National Register of Historic Places
- U.S. Historic district
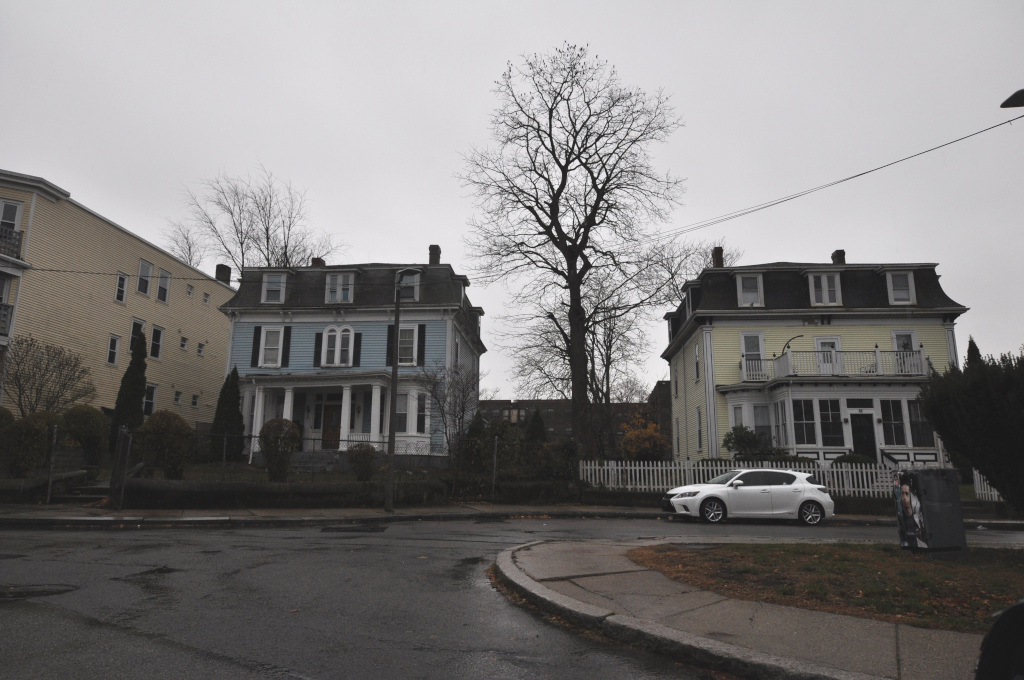

- Location within Massachusetts Location within the United States
- Location: 7-15 Waldren Rd., 348-363, 367 Walnut Ave., 8-81 Walnut Park, 7-20 Wardman Rd., 65-71 Westminster Ave., Roxbury, Boston, Massachusetts
- Coordinates: 42°18′55″N 71°5′45″W
- Built: 1912
- Architect: Multiple
- Architectural style: Classical Revival
- NRHP reference No.: 100007348
- Added to NRHP: January 21, 2022

The Walnut Park Historic District is a historic district encompassing a cluster of multifamily brick buildings in the Roxbury neighborhood of Boston, Massachusetts. Roughly centered on the junction of Walnut Park and Waldren Road, the area was developed in the early 20th century during a major Jewish migration, and includes a fine sample of Colonial Revival architecture. The district was listed on the National Register of Historic Places in 2022.

== Description and history ==
Walnut Park is a residential street located in southern Roxbury, extending roughly northwest–southeast between Washington Street and Walnut Street a short way north of Franklin Park. Near the center of the roadway's length is a narrow central oval park, with Waldren Road extending northeasterly at its eastern end. There are several clusters of brick apartment houses near this junction. On the northeast side of Walnut Park stand three similarly styled apartment houses, designed by Saul Moffie and built between 1925 and 1928. Waldren Road and Wardman Road (which parallels it) are lined with a second set of apartment houses, built in 1912 to neoclassical designs by Frederick Norcross, a prominent local architect who designed many similar blocks in the Boston urban area. Norcross is also believed to be responsible for the designs of two nearby wood-frame residences.

The Walnut Park area was partly country estates in the 19th century. In 1910, Simon Hurwitz purchased the former estate of Charles Clapp, which was on the northeast side of Walnut Park, and oversaw the subdivision of the estate and construction of apartments on Waldren and Wardman Roads. This rapid growth was spurred by the arrival of an elevated railway at nearby Egleston Square in 1906. In the 1920s, developer Barnard Swartz acquired the property of William Whiting, on which he built three apartment blocks.

== See also ==
- National Register of Historic Places listings in southern Boston, Massachusetts
