= Berger Factory =

- U.S. National Register of Historic Places
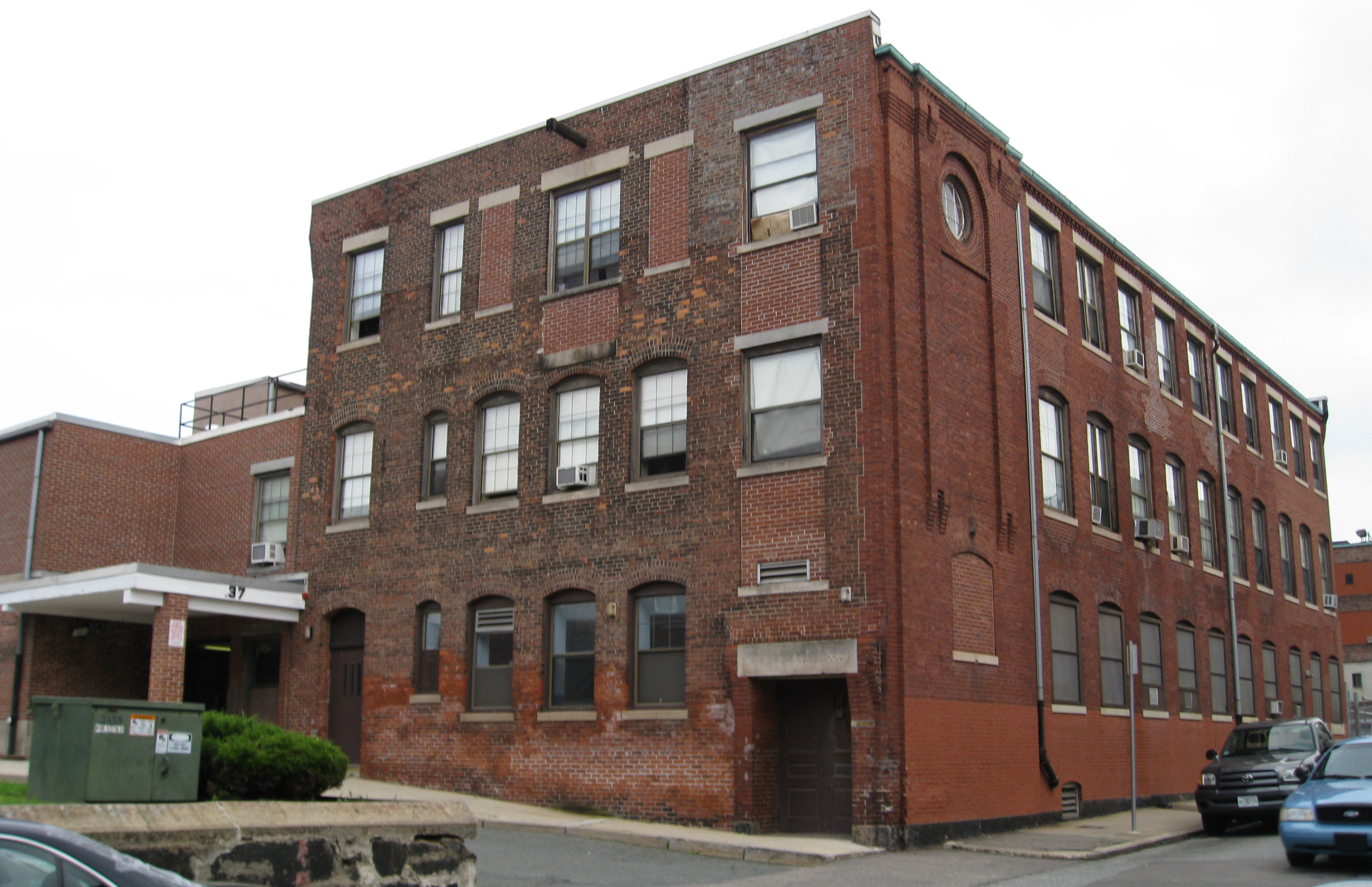
- Berger Factory

- Location within Massachusetts Location within the United States
- Location: 37 Williams St., Roxbury, Boston, Massachusetts
- Coordinates: 42°19′58″N 71°4′59″W
- Area: less than one acre
- Built: 1902
- Architect: George Moffette, Henry J. Preston
- NRHP reference No.: 80000677
- Added to NRHP: April 9, 1980

The Berger Factory is a historic factory building at 37 Williams Street in Boston, Massachusetts. Built in 1902, it was home to one of the nation's first manufacturers of precision engineering and surveying instruments, and a surviving example of Roxbury's late 19th-century industrial development. It was listed on the National Register of Historic Places in 1980, and now houses residences.

== Description ==
The former Berger Factory is located just north of Roxbury's central Nubian Square (formerly Dudley Square), on the north side of Williams Street between Shawmut Avenue and Washington Street. It is a relatively architecturally undistinguished brick industrial building, three stories in height, and covered by a flat roof. A single-story ell, also with a flat roof gives the building an L shape. The street facing facade is basically ten bays wide, with windows on the first two floors topped by brick segmental arches, and those on the third with stone lintels. Left of the window bays is an eleventh bay, with a bricked-over smaller window on the ground floor, and decorative brickwork on the levels above, capped by a round-arch projection with a round window. The interior of the building has been converted into residential use.

The Berger Company was founded in 1871 by Christian Berger, a German immigrant who had learned the manufacture of precision surveying instruments in England. At first known as Buff and Berger, it was originally located in downtown Boston, moving to this newly constructed facility in 1902. The main block was designed by Boston architect George Moffette, and the ell, added in 1907, was the work of Henry J. Preston. The company occupied these premises until 1976, when it moved to a new facility in Mattapan. After being vacant for some years, it was converted into residences.

The Berger Company was the first American manufacturer of precision engineering equipment. Its gear was used in surveys for the Panama Canal, in the construction of New York City skyscrapers, and in American polar expeditions of Admiral Richard E. Byrd and Robert Peary.

== See also ==
- National Register of Historic Places listings in southern Boston, Massachusetts
