= Elm Hill Park Historic District =

Historic district in Massachusetts, United States

- U.S. National Register of Historic Places
- U.S. Historic district
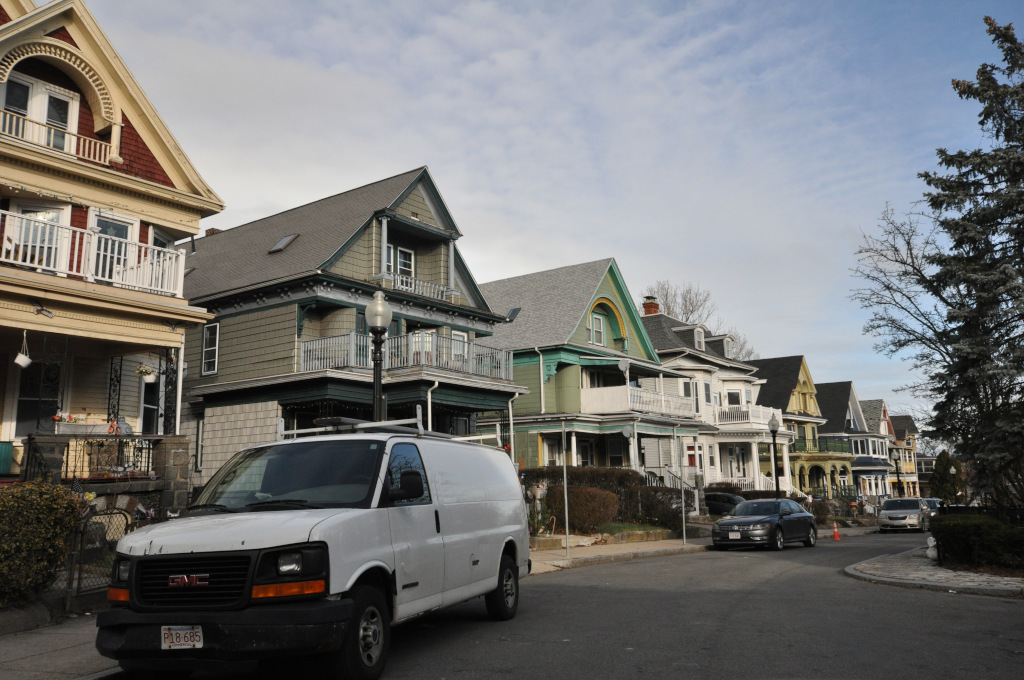

- Location within Massachusetts Location within the United States
- Location: 2-38 Elm Hill Park, 538-570 Warren St., Boston, Massachusetts
- Coordinates: 42°18′46″N 71°4′57″W
- Area: 3.5 acres (1.4 ha)
- Built: 1905
- Architectural style: Colonial Revival, Queen Anne, Richardsonian Romanesque
- NRHP reference No.: 100006078
- Added to NRHP: February 1, 2021

The Elm Hill Park Historic District is a historic district encompassing a small residential area in the Roxbury neighborhood of Boston, Massachusetts. It encompasses a residential development created in the early 20th century, including fine examples of Colonial Revival and Queen Anne wood-frame construction, as well as a series of brick Romanesque apartment houses. The district was listed on the National Register of Historic Places in 2021.

== Description and history ==
Elm Hill Park is located in Dorchester, on the east side of Warren Street between Franklin Park and Nubian Square. Elm Hill Park is a dead-end residential street, most notable for a central linear park running for much of its length. At its entry from Warren Street, the street is flanked by pairs of nearly identical Romanesque brick apartment houses. The houses on Elm Hill Park are of wood-frame construction, and are high quality examples of Queen Anne and Colonial Revival architecture, typically housing one or two residential units each.

Prior to its development in the early 20th century, the Elm Hill Park area was part of a country estate. In 1861 Samuel Little, a bank president, built the house now standing at 20 Elm Hill Park. The area was later subdivided, but was recombined for development by Alexander Chisholm, a Canadian immigrant, in 1899. Chisholm designed and built the apartment houses fronting his development, and laid out the linear park and built the houses facing it in the first decade of the 20th century. Early residents were apparently Americans, but they were quickly supplanted by a wave of immigrants mainly from Russia. By the mid-20th century residents were once again predominantly American-born.

== See also ==
- National Register of Historic Places listings in southern Boston, Massachusetts
