= Green Street station =

Metro station in Boston, Massachusetts, US

Green
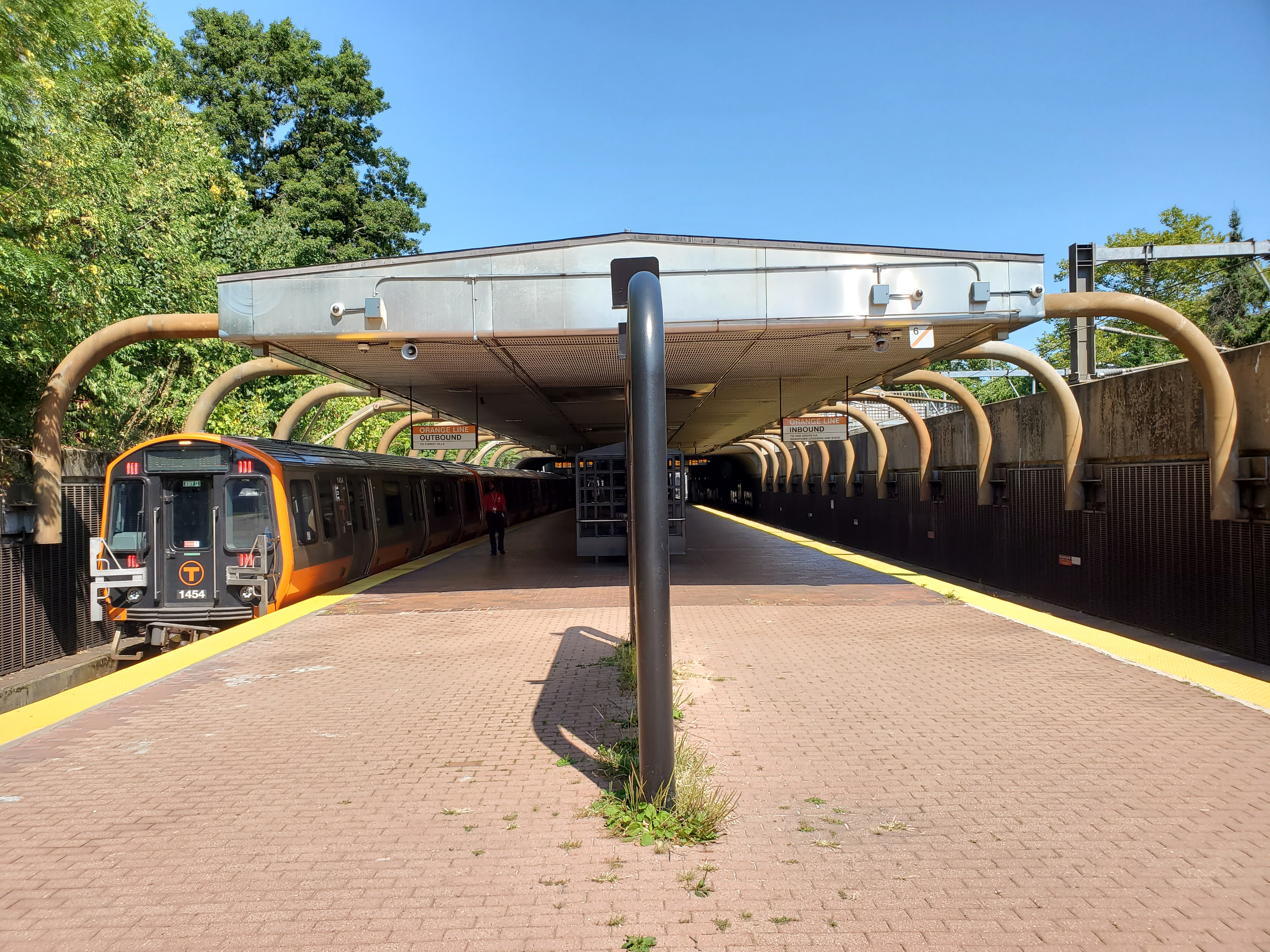
- A southbound train at Green Street station in 2024

General information
- Location: 150 Green Street; Jamaica Plain, Boston, Massachusetts
- Coordinates: 42.31042°N 71.10763°W
- Line: Southwest Corridor
- Platforms: 1 island platform
- Tracks: 2

Construction
- Structure type: Open cut
- Cycle facilities: 22 spaces
- Accessible: Yes

History
- Opened: 1842 (mainline station); September 22, 1912 (elevated station); May 4, 1987 (modern station)
- Closed: September 29, 1940 (mainline station); April 30, 1987 (elevated station)
- Rebuilt: June 1, 1897 (mainline station)
- Former names: Jamaica Plain (mainline station)

Passengers
- FY2019: 3,055 daily boardings

Services
Preceding station	MBTA	Following station
Forest Hills Terminus	Orange Line	Stony Brook toward Oak Grove
Former services (at elevated station)
Preceding station	MBTA	Following station
Forest Hills Terminus	Orange Line	Egleston toward Everett
Location

Green Street station (signed as Green) is a rapid transit station in Boston, Massachusetts. It serves the MBTA's Orange Line and is located in the southern part of the Jamaica Plain neighborhood. Green Street is the least-used station on the Orange Line, averaging 3,055 weekday boardings in FY 2019. Like all Orange Line stations, it is fully accessible.

== Station design ==
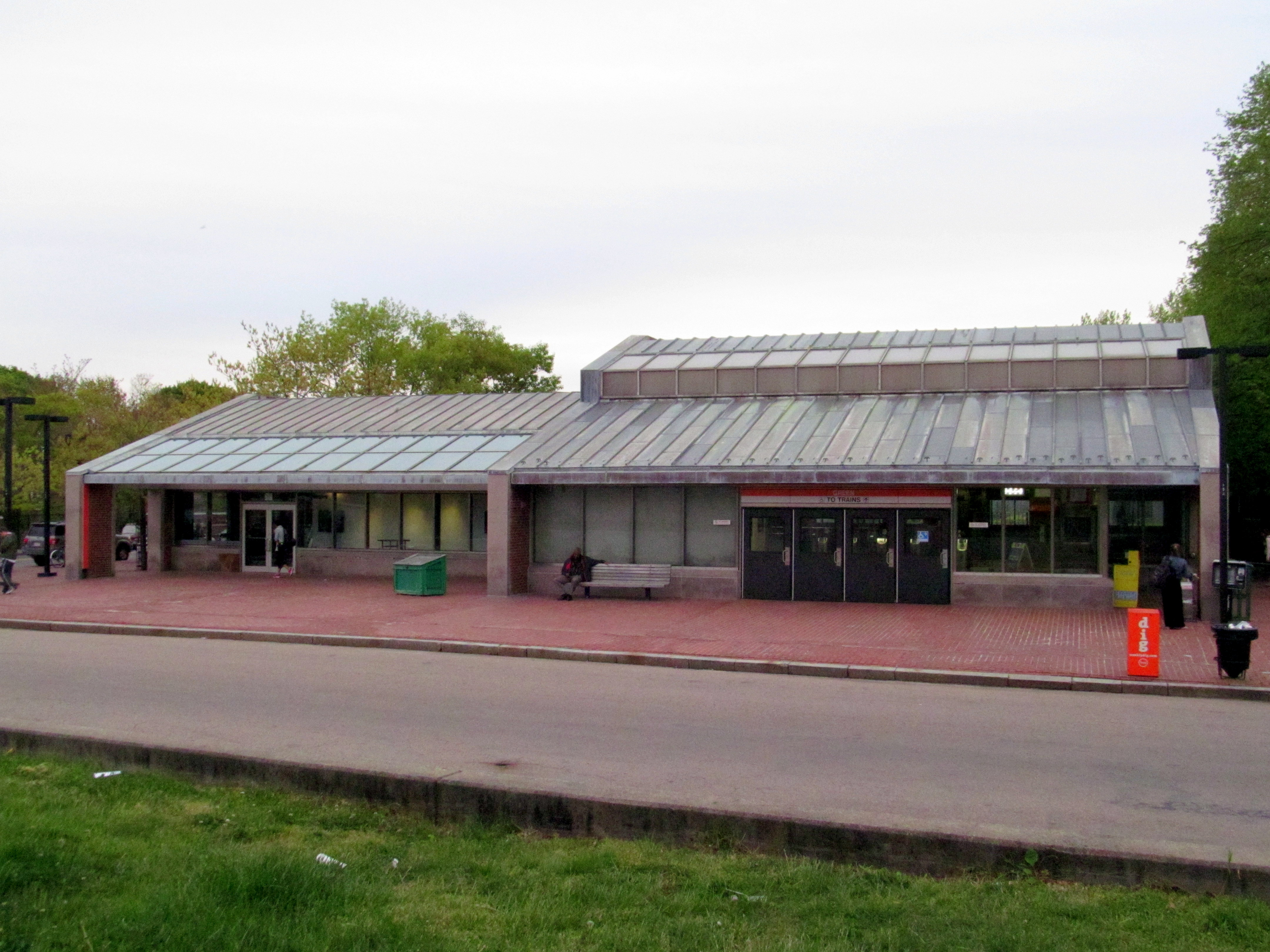
Green Street station headhouse in May 2012

Green Street station is located in central Jamaica Plain, about 0.4 miles (0.6 km) east of the primary business district on Centre Street. The headhouse is located at street level above the trenched Southwest Corridor on a block bounded by Green Street, Amory Street, Gordon Street, and Woolsley Square. The island platform for the Orange Line extends south from the headhouse. The three mainline tracks of the Southwest Corridor, used for MBTA Commuter Rail and Amtrak, are on the east side of the Orange Line tracks and platform.

=== Art gallery ===
Like some other Orange Line stations built in the Southwest Corridor, Green Street has street-level retail space. Since the late 1990s, a succession of related art galleries has been located inside the station.

A local artist, James Hull, noted that the space was empty in 1996. He reached an agreement with the MBTA's leasing agent under which he paid no rent, and "The Gallery @ Green Street" opened in 1998. Staffed by volunteers, the gallery displayed contemporary works by a range of artists, including local students and non-commercial pieces by experienced artists. Hull later agreed to install air conditioning and a bathroom in return for use of the space.

In December 2006, the space became the home of a successor gallery, the Axiom Center for New and Experimental Media, which was operated by a non-profit artist collective. It featured rotating shows of artworks incorporating modern technology. In July 2012, Axiom closed the gallery; the space became the Boston Cyberarts Gallery, operated by an associated group.

== History ==
=== Jamaica Plain station ===
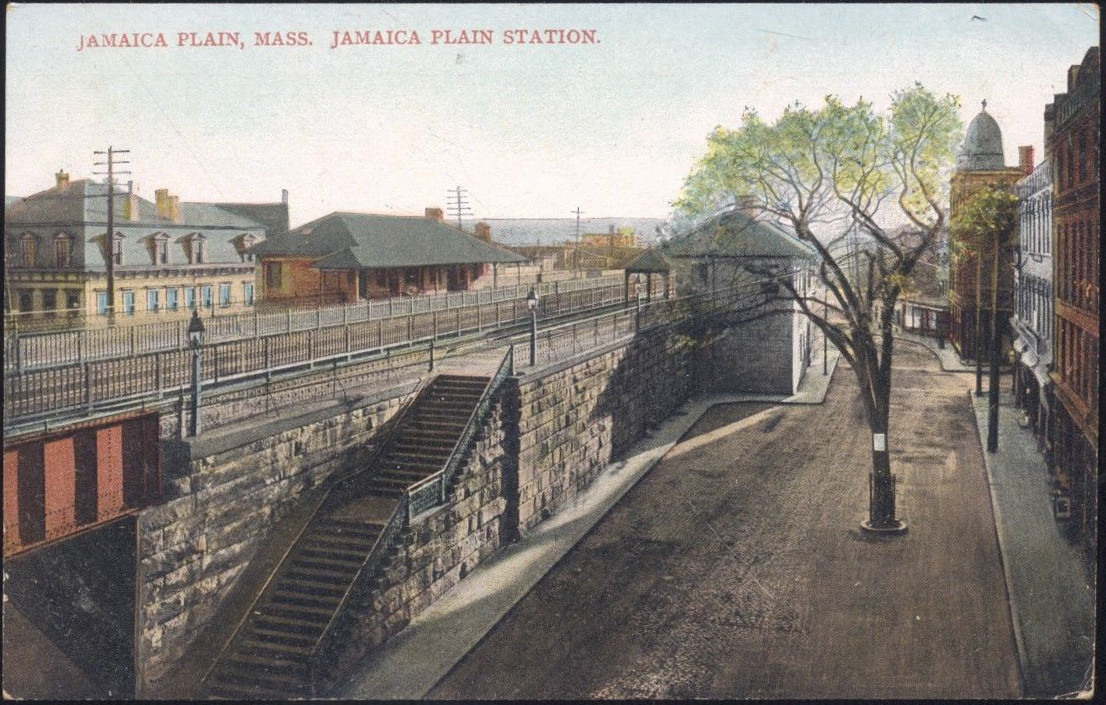
Jamaica Plain station around 1910

In 1842, the Boston and Providence Railroad (built starting in 1832) began offering service to Jamaica Plain station, located on the site of today's Green Street station; commuter rail service to the station would continue, uninterrupted, for nearly a century. The railroad opened a new station building at Jamaica Plain in 1871.

Starting in 1891, the Old Colony Railroad (which had acquired the B&P in 1888, and was itself acquired in 1893 by the New York, New Haven and Hartford Railroad) raised the section of its main line through Jamaica Plain (extending from Massachusetts Avenue to the current location of Forest Hills station) onto a 4-track stone embankment to eliminate dangerous grade crossings. The project involved the building of five new stations in Roxbury and Jamaica Plain; the existing stations at Roxbury Crossing, Jamaica Plain, and Forest Hills were replaced with new elevated stations, while new stations were built at Heath Street and Boylston Street. The Jamaica Plain station opened on June 1, 1897, along with the other four new stations.

Although the NYNH&H local stations in Jamaica Plain continued to operate for over three decades following the southward extension of the Washington Street Elevated, they were ultimately unable to compete with the Elevated. The three remaining stops, including Jamaica Plain station, were closed on September 29, 1940 due to a lack of passengers.

=== Elevated station ===
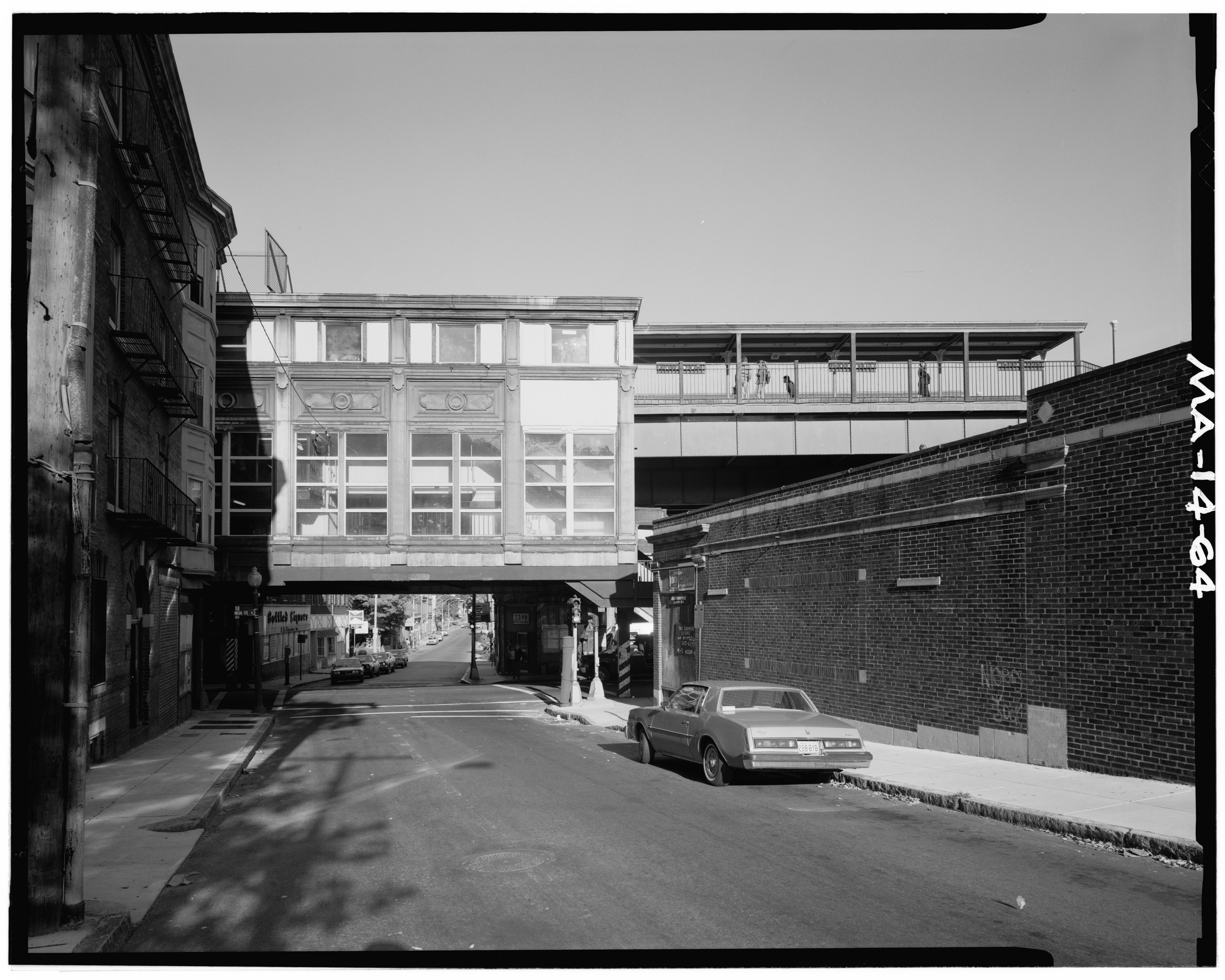
The elevated station in 1982

On November 22, 1909, the Washington Street Elevated was extended south along Washington Street from its original southern terminus at Dudley Square, with new stations at Egleston and Forest Hills. Both Egleston and Forest Hills allowed direct connections to the Elevated from streetcar routes serving Roxbury, Dorchester, and Jamaica Plain (as well as, in the case of Forest Hills, to NYNH&H commuter trains); however, El ridership from the areas immediately surrounding the extension also proved high, and an infill station at Green Street (three blocks to the east of the NYNH&H station) opened on September 22, 1912.

On December 5, 1960, the MTA began operating "modified express service" on the Elevated during the morning rush hour. Every other train bypassed Green Street and three other stations. This was discontinued in September 1961 to reduce wait times at the skipped stations, all of which were outdoors.

=== Modern station ===
In the 1960s, plans took hold to extend I-95 into downtown Boston along the NYNH&H's right-of-way and to replace the Washington Street Elevated (from 1967 known as the Orange Line) with a rapid transit line running in the new highway's median; these plans led to the demolition of hundreds of homes and the clearing of a long strip of land (the Southwest Corridor) extending through Roxbury and Jamaica Plain all the way up to Green Street, before the project was halted by highway revolts in 1969 and the February 11, 1970 announcement by Governor Francis W. Sargent of a moratorium on new highway construction within the Route 128 corridor, and eventually cancelled by Governor Sargent in 1972. The cleared strip of land was eventually developed into the Southwest Corridor Park, and the Orange Line was moved to a new alignment along the Corridor in 1987 despite the cancellation of the project originally calling for its relocation. This included a new rapid transit station at Green Street, on the site of the former NYNH&H station; the old Green Street station, along with the rest of the Washington Street Elevated, was permanently closed on April 30, 1987, and the new station opened on May 4, as did the eight other new stations on the southern Orange Line.

Green Street was not built as a bus transfer station, and lacks an off-street busway. It has not been served by MBTA bus service since route 48 was discontinued on July 1, 2012. The entire Orange Line, including Green Street station, was closed from August 19 to September 18, 2022, during maintenance work.
