= Melnea Cass Boulevard station =

Bus stop in Boston, Massachusetts, US

Melnea Cass Boulevard
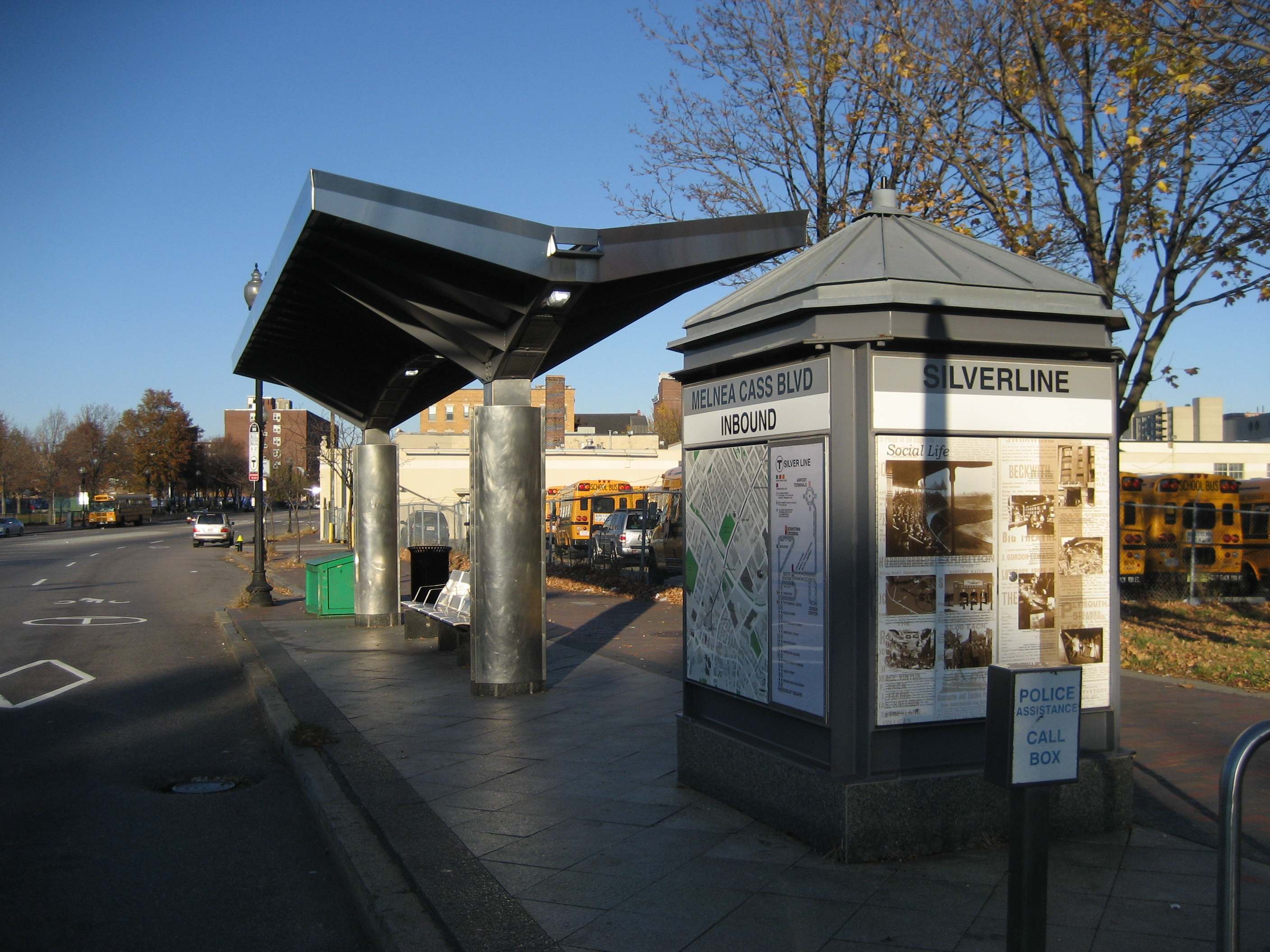
- The northbound Silver Line shelter at Melnea Cass Boulevard

General information
- Location: Washington Street at Melnea Cass Boulevard; Roxbury, Boston, Massachusetts
- Coordinates: 42.3329°N 71.0810°W
- Connections: MBTA bus: 1, 8, 19, 47, 171, CT3

Construction
- Accessible: Yes

History
- Opened: July 20, 2002

Passengers
- 2012: 466 (weekday average boardings)

Services
Preceding station	MBTA	Following station
Nubian Terminus	Silver Line SL4	Lenox Street toward South Station
Nubian Terminus	Silver Line SL5	Lenox Street toward Downtown Crossing
Location

Melnea Cass Boulevard station is a street-level bus station on the Washington Street branch of the MBTA Silver Line bus rapid transit service. It is located on Washington Street at Melnea Cass Boulevard in the Roxbury neighborhood of Boston, Massachusetts. The stop is served by the SL4 and SL5 Silver Line routes; several local MBTA bus routes stop nearby. Like all Silver Line stops, Melnea Cass Boulevard is accessible.

Silver Line service on Washington Street began on July 20, 2002, replacing the route 49 bus. Service levels doubled on October 15, 2009, with the introduction of the SL4 route.

Washington Street was a proposed stop on the Urban Ring – a circumferential bus rapid transit (BRT) line designed to connect the existing radial MBTA rail lines to reduce overcrowding in the downtown stations. Under draft plans released in 2008, buses would have run in dedicated lanes on Melnea Cass Boulevard, with platforms at Washington Street. A spur of the Urban Ring would have run on Washington Street to Dudley Square. The project was cancelled in 2010.
