= Dudley Station Historic District =

Historic district in Massachusetts, United States

- U.S. National Register of Historic Places
- U.S. Historic district
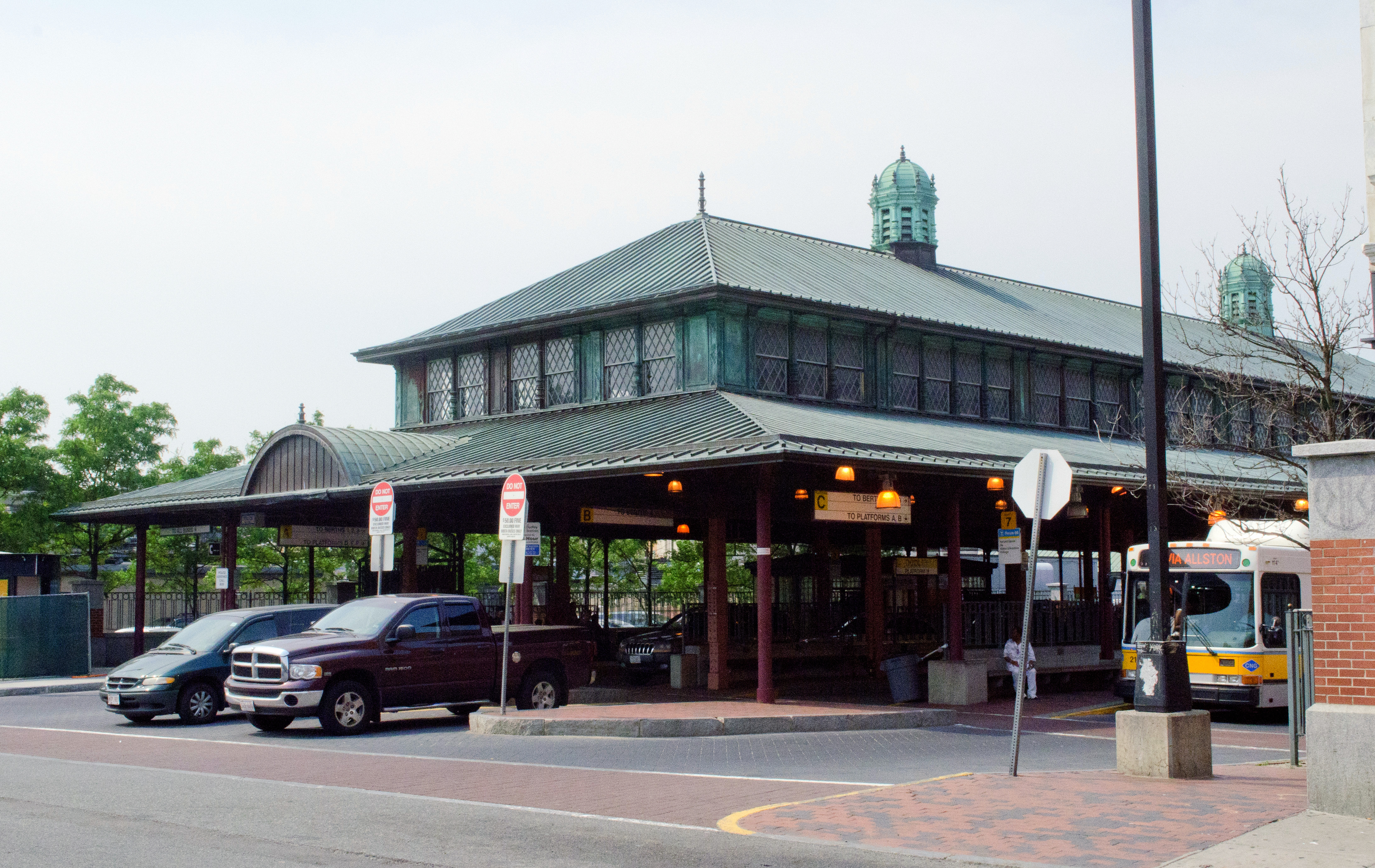
- Dudley Station

- Location within Massachusetts Location within the United States
- Location: Boston, Massachusetts
- Coordinates: 42°19′48″N 71°5′4″W
- Architect: Multiple
- Architectural style: Late 19th and 20th Century Revivals, Moderne, Late Victorian
- NRHP reference No.: 85003074
- Added to NRHP: December 5, 1985

Dudley Station Historic District is a historic district on Washington, Warren, and Dudley Streets in the Roxbury neighborhood of Boston, Massachusetts, United States. The central feature of the district is Dudley Square station (now Nubian station), a Beaux Arts/French Renaissance structure designed by Alexander Wadsworth Longfellow and built by the Boston Elevated Railway (BERy, a predecessor of the MBTA) in 1901. It is one of the best-preserved BERy stations remaining.

The district was added to the National Register of Historic Places in 1985.

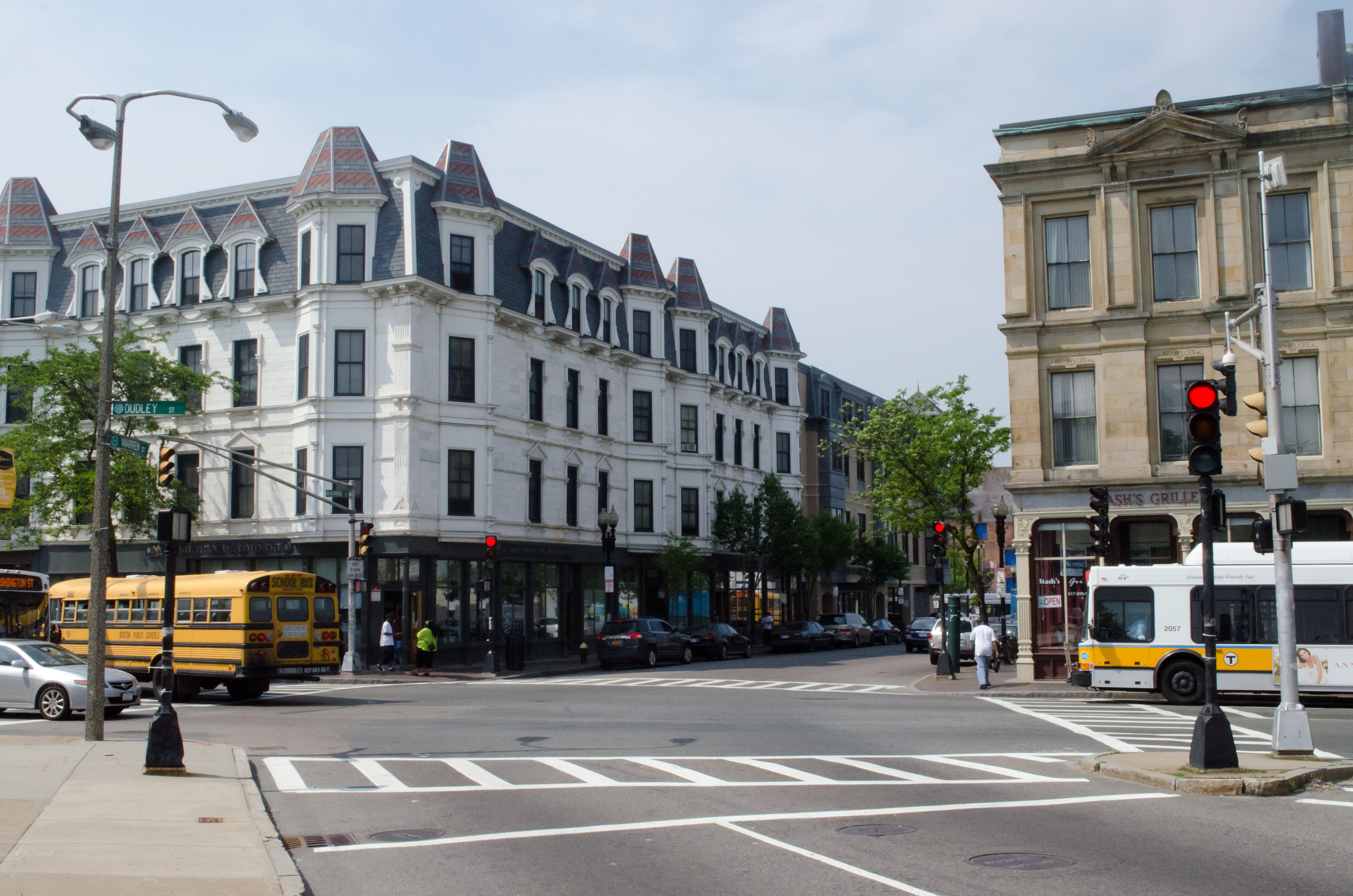
Dudley and Warren Streets

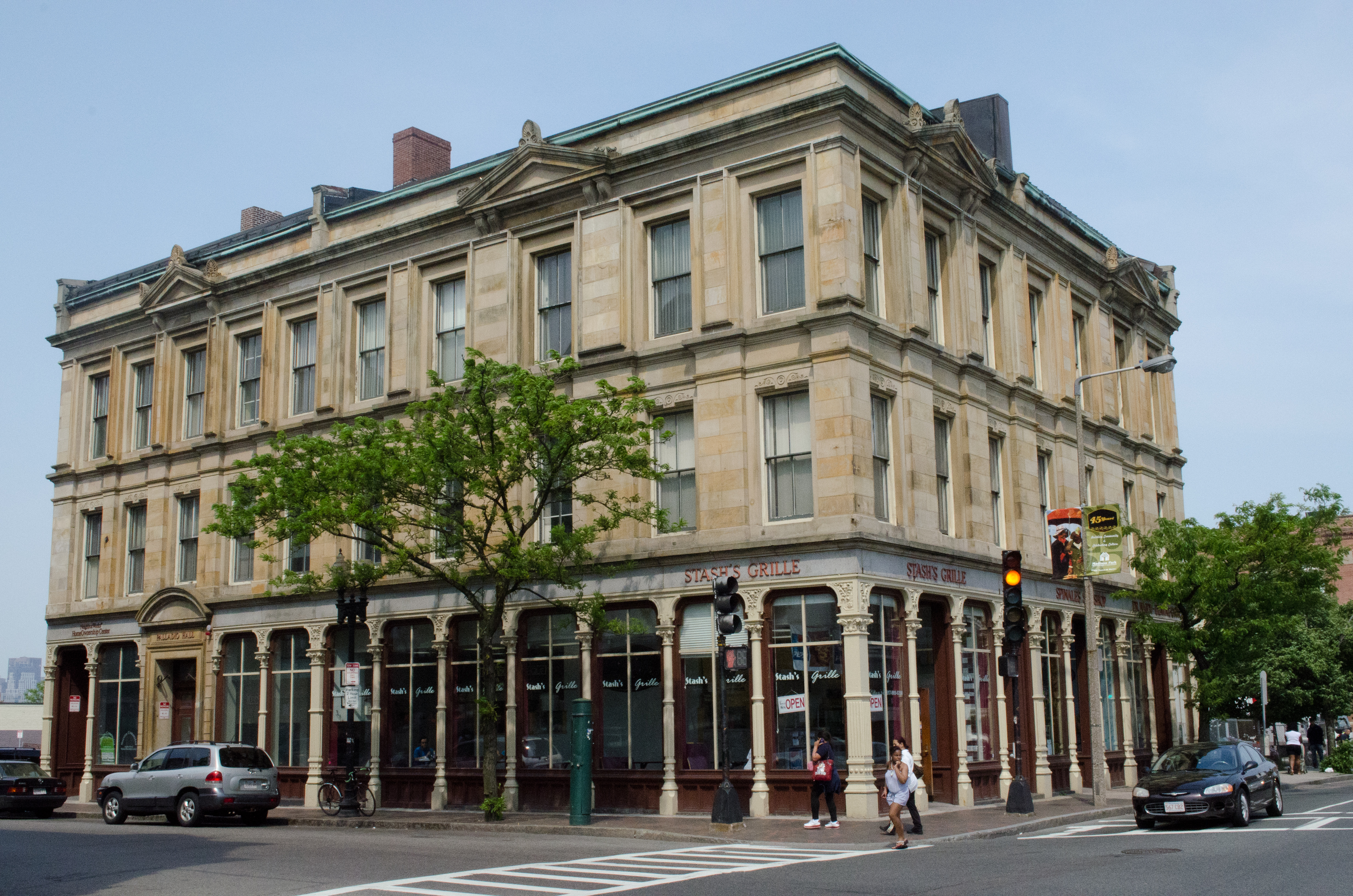
Palladio Hall

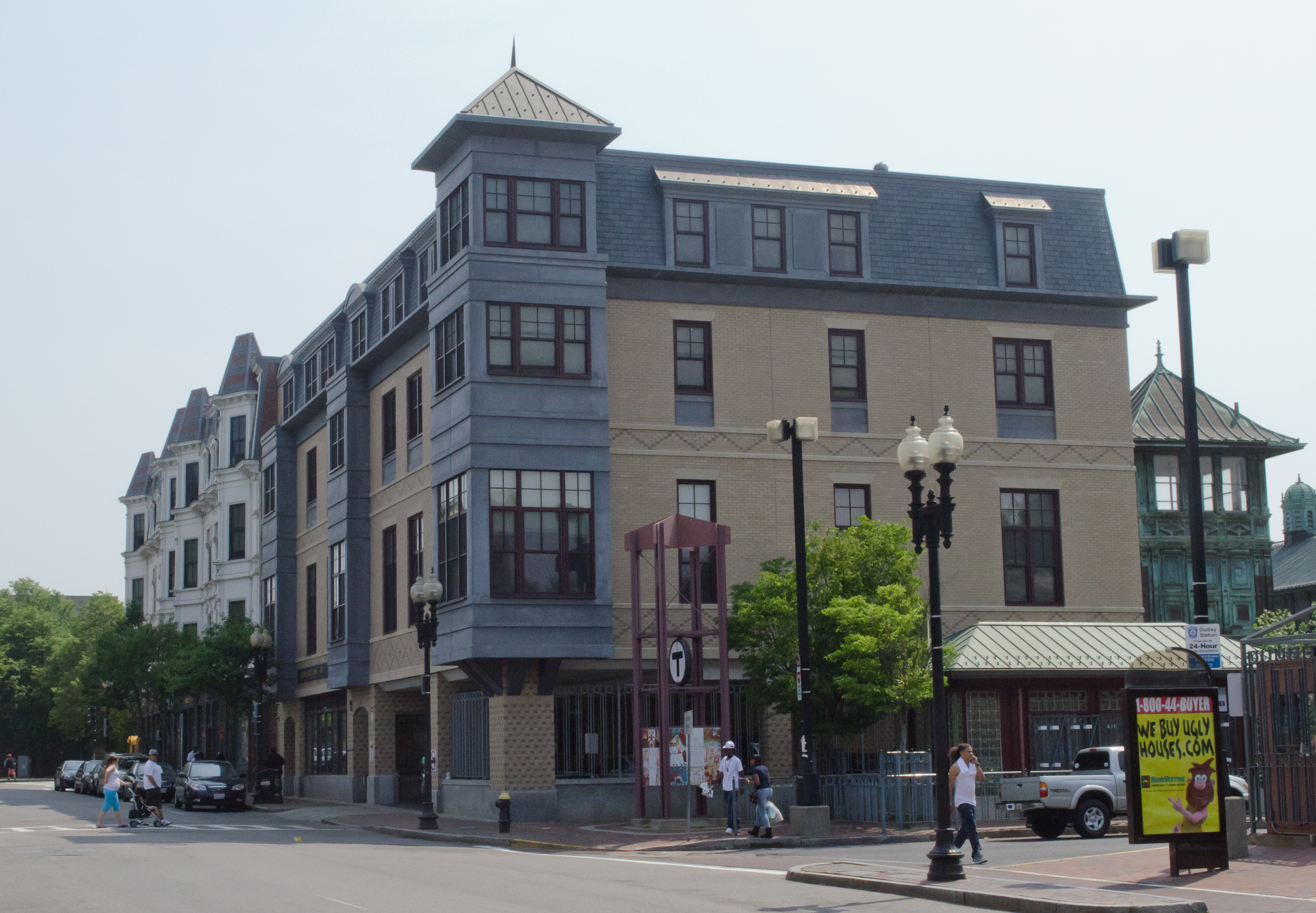
Warren Street

== See also ==
- National Register of Historic Places listings in southern Boston, Massachusetts
