= Washington Street Elevated =

Former elevated railroad in Boston, Massachusetts

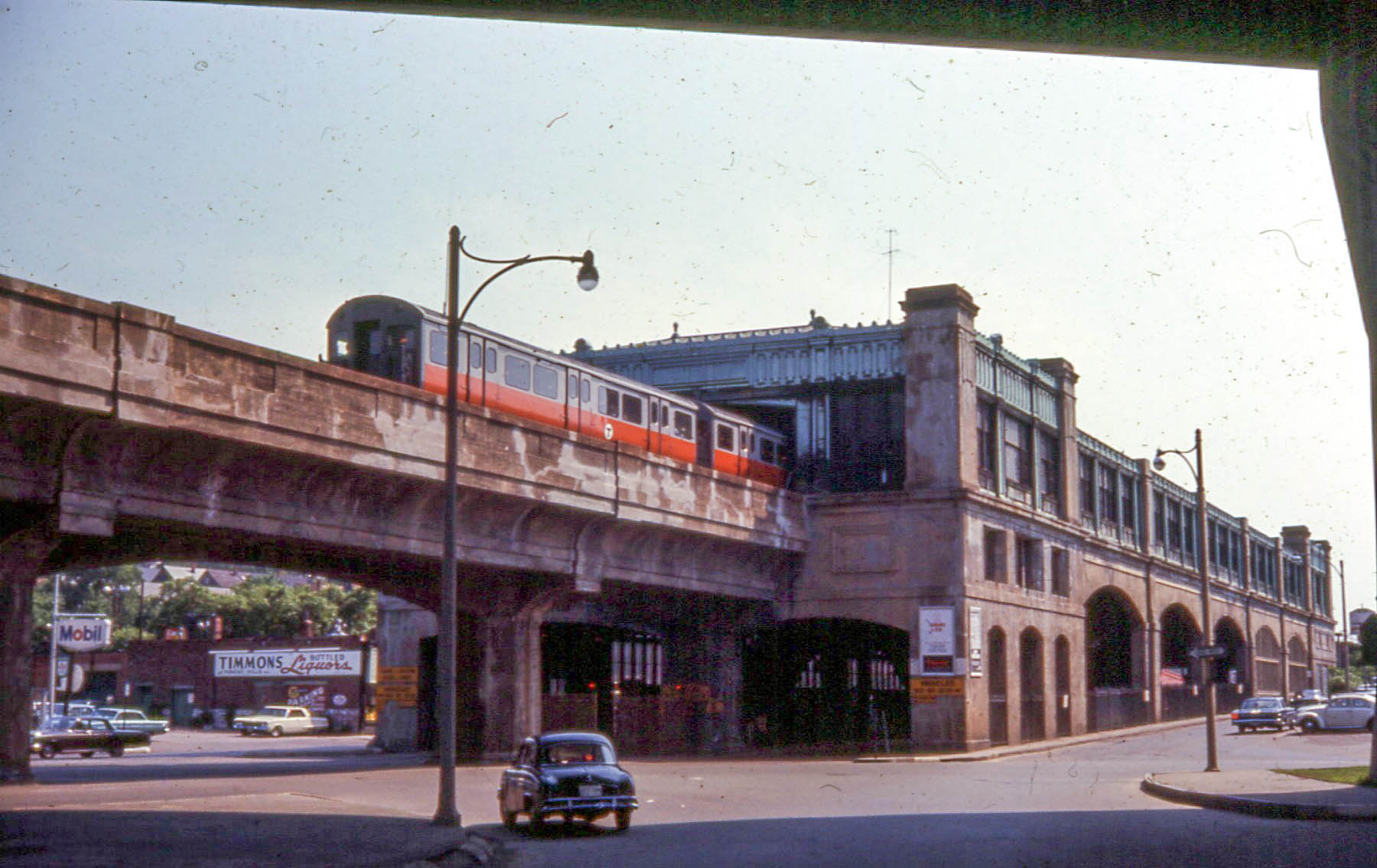
- An Orange Line train arriving at Forest Hills in June 1967

Overview
- Termini: Tower D; Forest Hills station
- Stations: 6

Service
- System: MBTA Orange Line

History
- Opened: June 10, 1901 (Dover-Dudley); November 22, 1909 (Egleston-Forest Hills)
- Closed: April 30, 1987

Technical
- Num of tracks: 2
- Track gauge: 4 ft 8 1/2 in (1,435 mm)

The Washington Street Elevated was an elevated segment of Boston's Massachusetts Bay Transportation Authority subway system, comprising the southern stretch of the Orange Line. It ran from Chinatown through the South End and Roxbury, ending in Forest Hills in Jamaica Plain, Boston.

== History ==
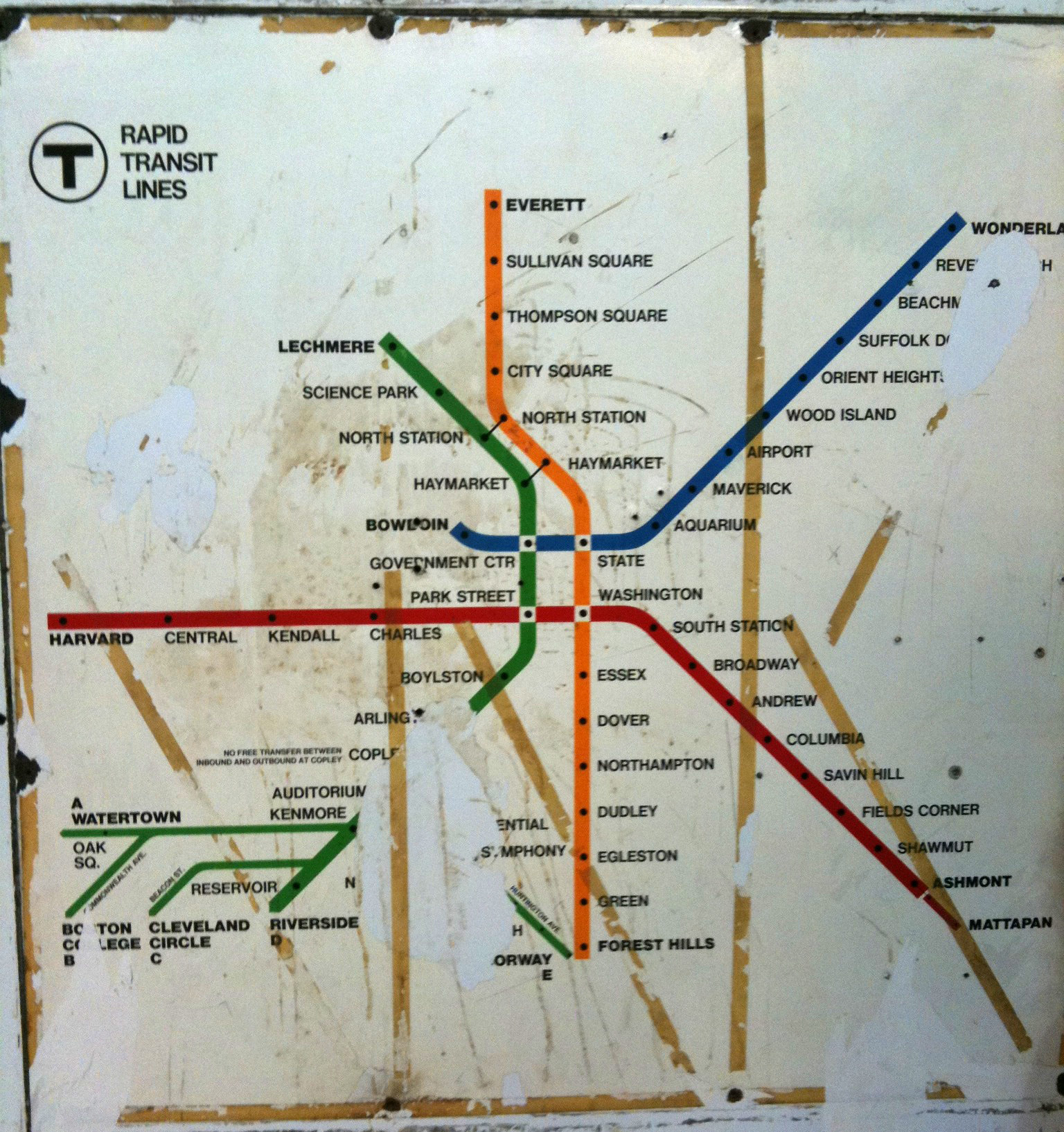
A 1967 MBTA map showing the Washington Street Elevated route, as it existed from 1938 to 1975

=== Construction ===
The initial section of the Main Line Elevated opened on June 10, 1901, running from Sullivan Square in Charlestown over the Charlestown Elevated, through the Canal Street incline into the Tremont Street subway, and out the Pleasant Street portal onto the Washington Street Elevated. The initial section of the elevated ran only to Dudley Square (now known as Nubian Square), with intermediate stations at Dover and Northampton. The Atlantic Avenue Elevated opened on August 22 of that year, joining the Washington Street El at Tower D Junction.

The El, Boston's first heavy rail metro line, proved extremely popular. The Washington Street Tunnel was opened on November 30, 1908, providing a separate route for the Main Line and allowing use of the Tremont Street subway for through streetcars. The southern portal of the tunnel connected with the elevated at Tower D. The elevated was extended south to Forest Hills on November 22, 1909, with an intermediate station at Egleston to transfer passengers from streetcars serving Roxbury and Dorchester. Although the elevated was built primarily to replace radial streetcar lines running to downtown, ridership from the areas surrounding the stations proved high, and an infill station at Green Street with fewer streetcar connections was opened on September 22, 1912.

=== Replacement ===
The Washington Street Elevated was the last elevated section of the Orange Line to remain standing. The Atlantic Avenue Elevated ended service in 1938, while the Charlestown Elevated was replaced with the largely surface-level Haymarket North Extension in 1975.

By the 1980s, however, the elevated was showing its age. The steel uprights had lost a substantial portion of their mass to rusting, though it was not structurally unsound since it was heavily overbuilt, and a $3 million repainting in 1975 stopped further oxidation. However, the stations were less solidly constructed, and with their narrow steel stairways and wooden platforms they would have required substantial renovations for continued usage and handicapped accessibility. Additionally, the elevated was unpopular with many residents since it was noisy and deprived much of Washington Street of sunlight.

From 1979 to 1987, the four-track railroad embankment between Back Bay and Forest Hills, originally acquired for a cancelled highway project, was converted to a trench with three mainline tracks and two rapid transit tracks as the Southwest Corridor project. Addition of rapid transit to the corridor had been proposed as a branch of the predecessor BERy's streetcar network in 1926, and as a relocation of the Orange Line since 1966. The last service over the Washington Street Elevated ran on April 30, 1987; service began over the Southwest Corridor route on May 4. The elevated was removed soon after; some of the steel was later used for a new bridge carrying Arizona Route 188 over Theodore Roosevelt Lake.

=== Silver Line ===
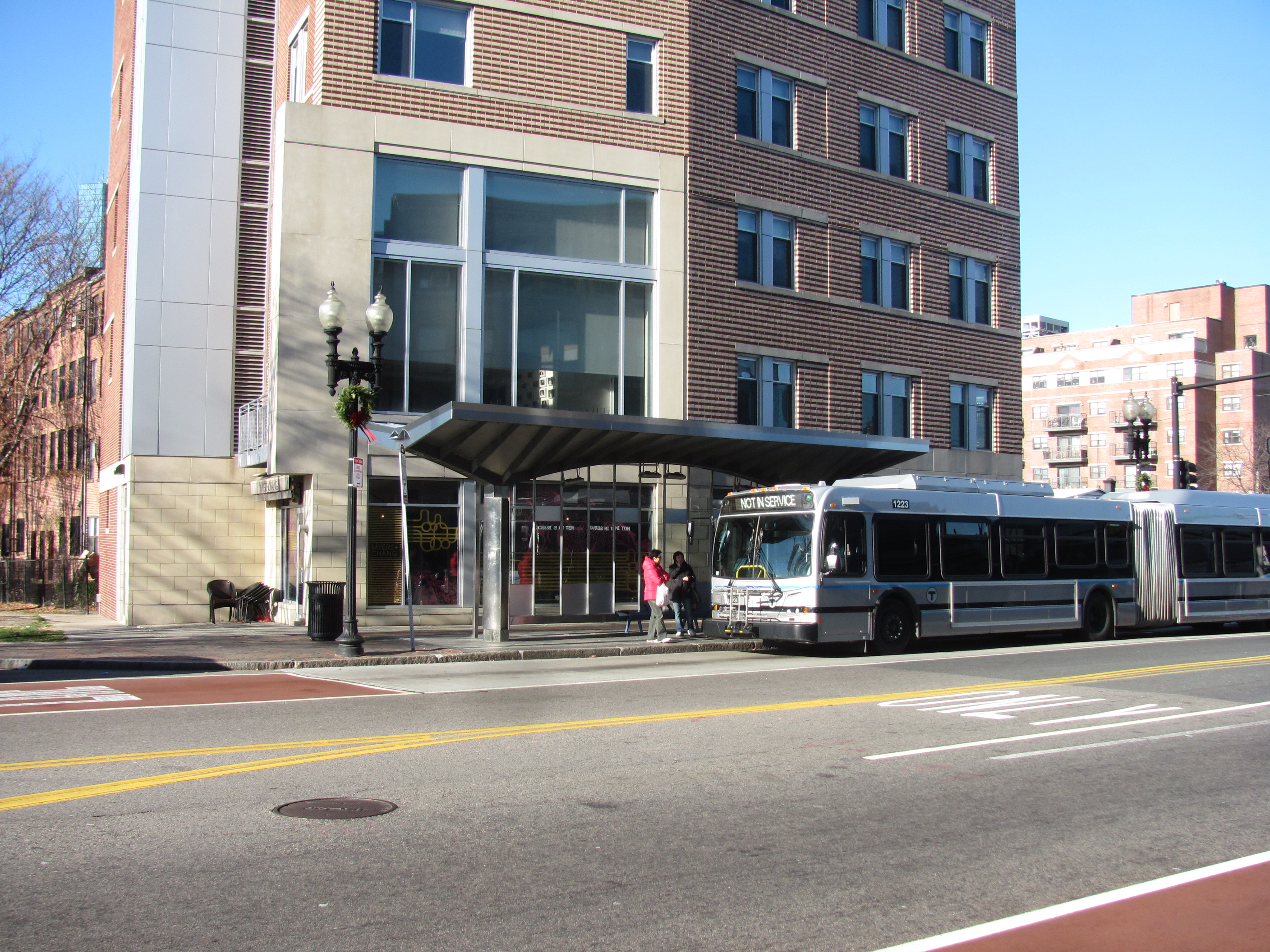
A Silver Line bus at East Berkeley Street stop, the former location of Dover station, in 2011

Since the Southwest Corridor was located somewhat further to the west than the elevated had been, away from neighborhood centers like Dudley and Egleston Squares, the MBTA promised that a branch of the light rail Green Line would be built to provide continued rapid transit service to those areas. However, such service was not forthcoming; instead, the 49 Northampton – Washington & Kneeland feeder bus route was extended to Dudley Square and given a more direct routing.

In 2002, the MBTA deployed bus rapid transit along much of the route from Dudley Square to Downtown Crossing in the form of Phase I of the controversial Silver Line, replacing the 49. Although branded as bus rapid transit, the Washington Street section of the Silver Line is generally considered short of the international BRT Standard, as it lacks bus rapid transit elements such as dedicated bus lanes and pre-pay stations. The Silver Line has also been subject to neighborhood criticism, as it makes fewer stops than the 49, but nevertheless fails to sufficiently decrease travel times as compared to the previous conventional bus service.

The 2003 Program for Mass Transportation considered the possibility of converting the Washington Street section of the Silver Line to light rail, as had originally been promised, by using the abandoned Pleasant Street incline and the currently-unused southern segment of the Tremont Street subway to connect with the Green Line at Boylston station. However, the Phase III tunnel and continued bus service was recommended instead.

The closing of the Washington Street Elevated prompted a 2012 review, the Roxbury-Dorchester-Mattapan Transit Needs Study. It recommended, as a long-term project, the light rail conversion of the Silver Line's Washington Street section (between Dudley Square and Downtown Crossing) and its connection to the Green Line via the abandoned tunnel, with a northern terminus at Government Center; with the additional possibility of extending south along Blue Hill Avenue to Mattapan station (and thus connecting with the Mattapan Line, and, indirectly, with the Red Line), following the route currently taken by the #28 bus.

== Stations ==
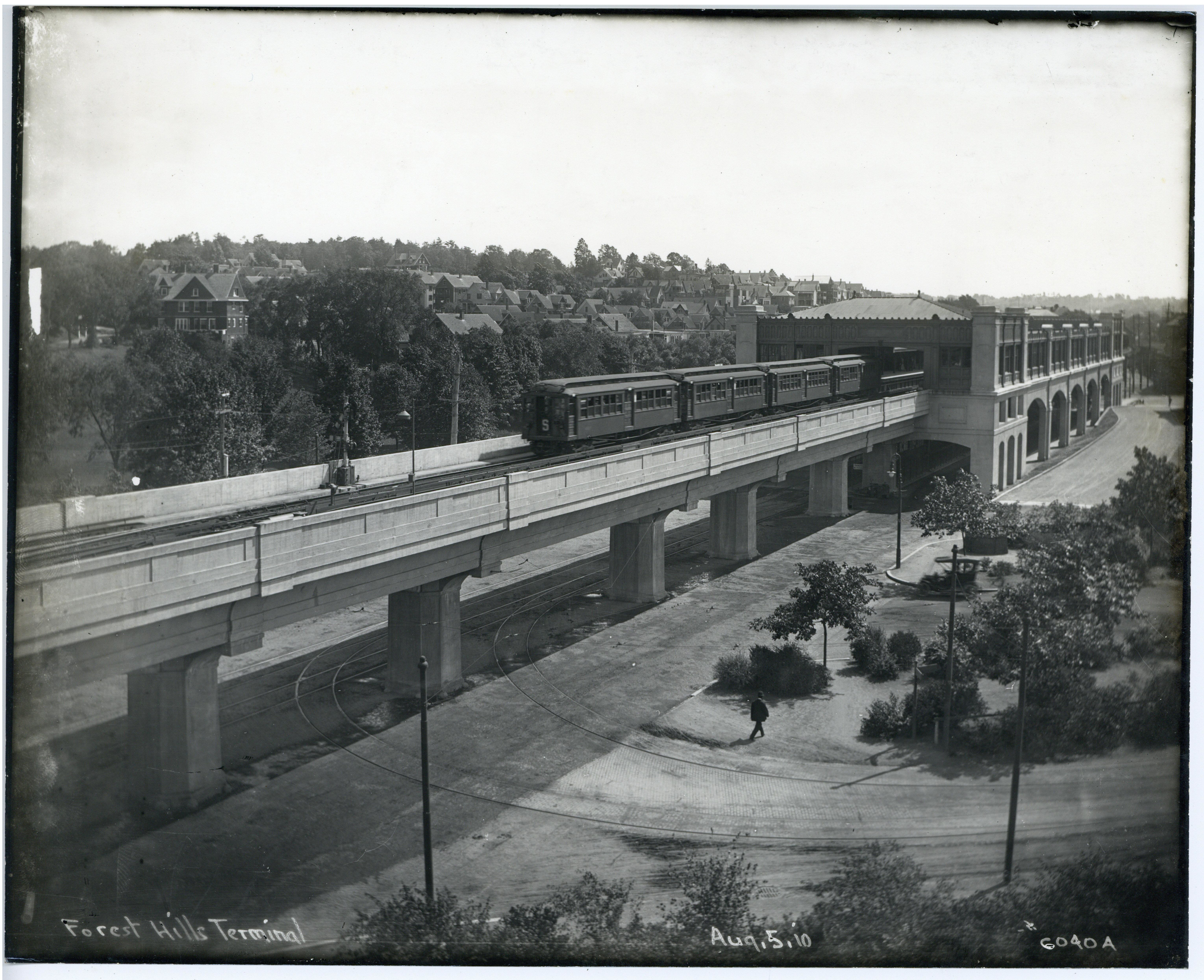
Forest Hills station in 1910

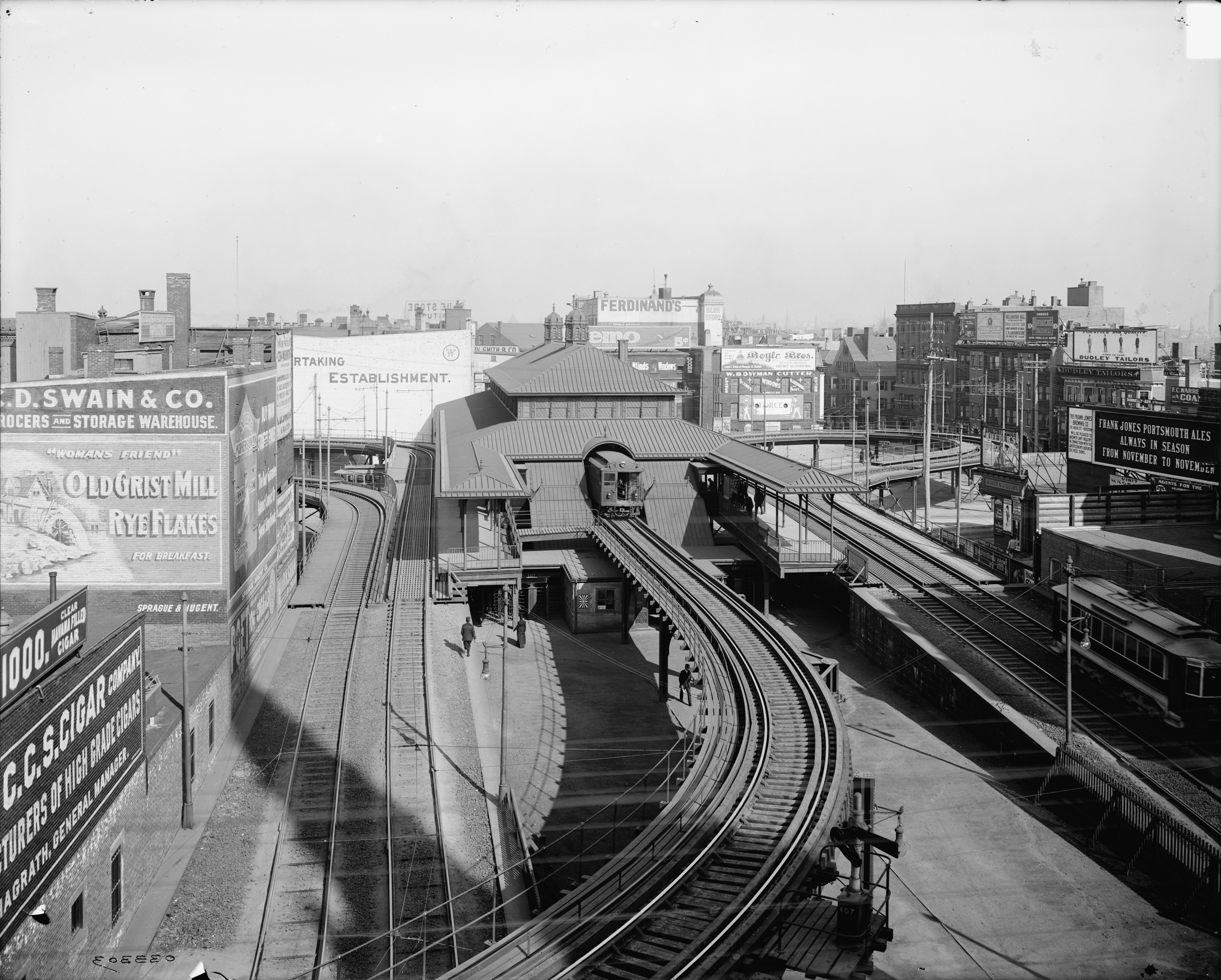
Dudley Terminal in 1904

The Washington Street Elevated consisted of six stations, the most complex and major of which were at Dudley Square and Forest Hills. Most of the original stations were designed by architect Alexander Wadsworth Longfellow Jr., and originally featured much in the way of ornamentation and architectural prowess. By the time the "El" closed, however, much of this detail had been lost to decades of decay, neglect, and cost-cutting. Forest Hills Station was designed by Edmund March Wheelwright and was quite different from the other stations along the line, featuring a square stone exterior rather than sloping rooflines.

Following the closure of the elevated, most of the stations were scrapped; however, the Northampton station headhouse was moved to the Seashore Trolley Museum in Kennebunkport, Maine in 1988, where it remains today, and parts of Dudley station were saved and incorporated into the current bus station.

The stations themselves were:

Station	Location	Opened	Transfers and notes
Forest Hills	Arborway and Washington St, Jamaica Plain	November 22, 1909	Green Line E branch (at Arborway)
Green Street	Green and Washington Sts, Jamaica Plain	September 11, 1912	
Egleston	Egleston Square, Roxbury	November 22, 1909	
Dudley	Dudley Square, Roxbury	June 10, 1901	
Northampton	Northampton St, South End	June 10, 1901	
Dover	Dover St (now East Berkeley St), South End	June 10, 1901	
Tower D junction, to Atlantic Avenue Elevated (1901–1938), Washington Street Tunnel (1908–1987), and Tremont Street subway (1901–1908)
