= Nubian station =

Bus and former rapid transit station in Boston, Massachusetts, US

Nubian
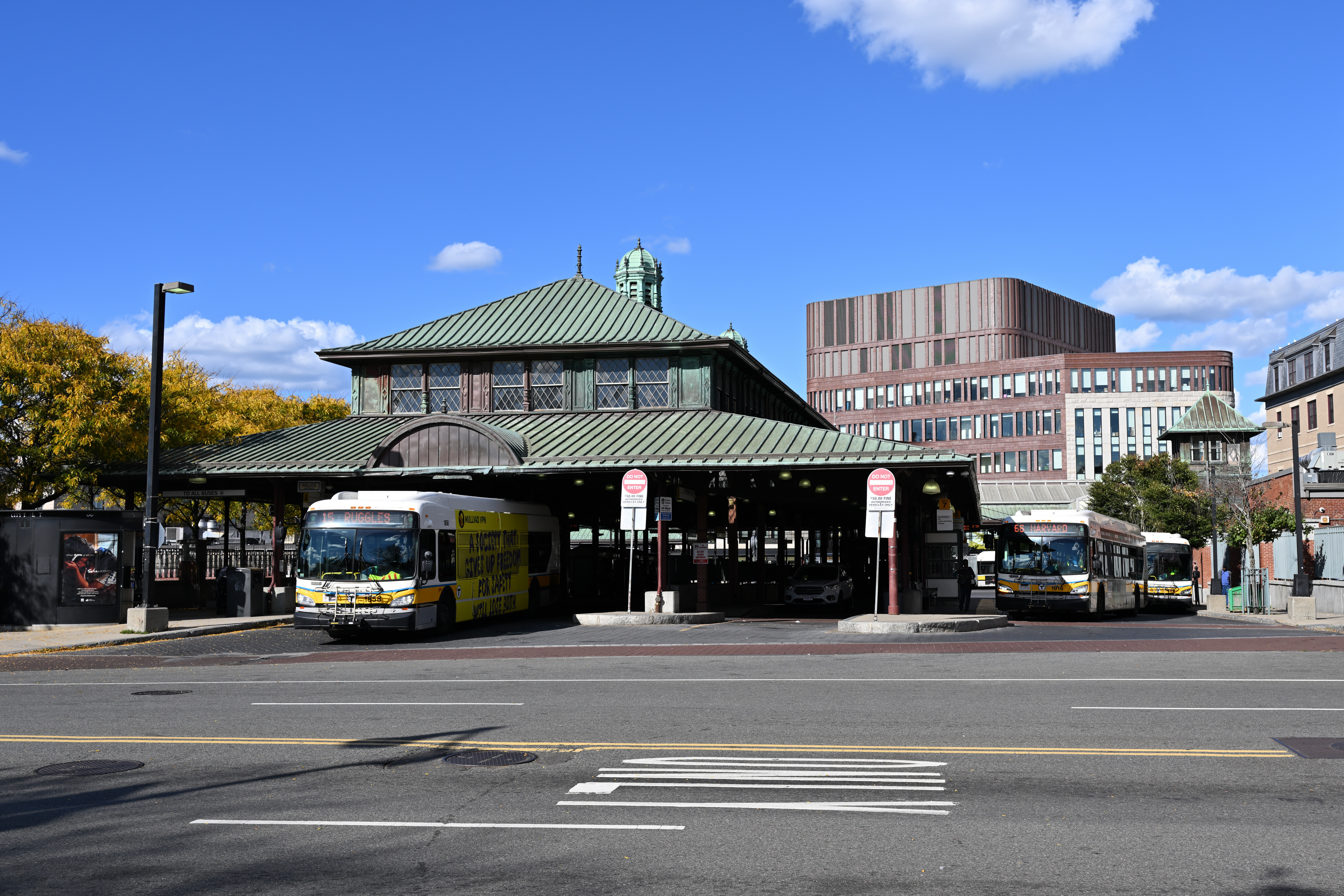
- The Dudley Street side of Nubian station in 2024

General information
- Location: Washington Street at Dudley Street; Roxbury, Boston, Massachusetts
- Coordinates: 42.3295°N 71.0840°W
- Connections: MBTA bus: 1, 8, 14, 15, 19, 23, 28, 29, 41, 42, 44, 45, 47, 66, 171

Construction
- Cycle facilities: "Pedal and Park" bicycle cage
- Accessible: Yes

History
- Opened: June 10, 1901 (Washington Street Elevated); July 20, 2002 (Silver Line)
- Closed: April 30, 1987 (Washington Street Elevated)

Passengers
- 2013 daily: 3,128 (Silver Line daily boardings)
- 2012 daily: 30,000 (MBTA bus weekday)

Services
Preceding station	MBTA	Following station
Terminus	Silver Line SL4	Melnea Cass Boulevard toward South Station
Terminus	Silver Line SL5	Melnea Cass Boulevard toward Downtown Crossing
Former services
Preceding station	MBTA	Following station
Egleston toward Forest Hills	Orange Line Closed 1987	Northampton toward Oak Grove
Location

Nubian station (formerly called Dudley Square, Dudley, or Dudley Street Terminal) is a ground-level Massachusetts Bay Transportation Authority (MBTA) bus station located in Nubian Square (formerly Dudley Square) in the Roxbury neighborhood of Boston, Massachusetts, United States. It is a transfer point between MBTA bus routes, including two Silver Line bus rapid transit lines and 15 local routes. Like all MBTA bus stops, Nubian is fully accessible.

The original Dudley Square station opened in 1901 as a BERy Main Line Elevated station. The last segment of the original Main Line Elevated, the Washington Street Elevated (including Dudley station), closed in 1987; six years later, Dudley was converted into its modern configuration. Silver Line service began in 2002. The station was renamed Nubian in June 2020, following the 2019 renaming of the square.

Nubian is a contributing property in the Dudley Station Historic District, which was added to the National Register of Historic Places in 1985.

== History ==
=== Original station ===
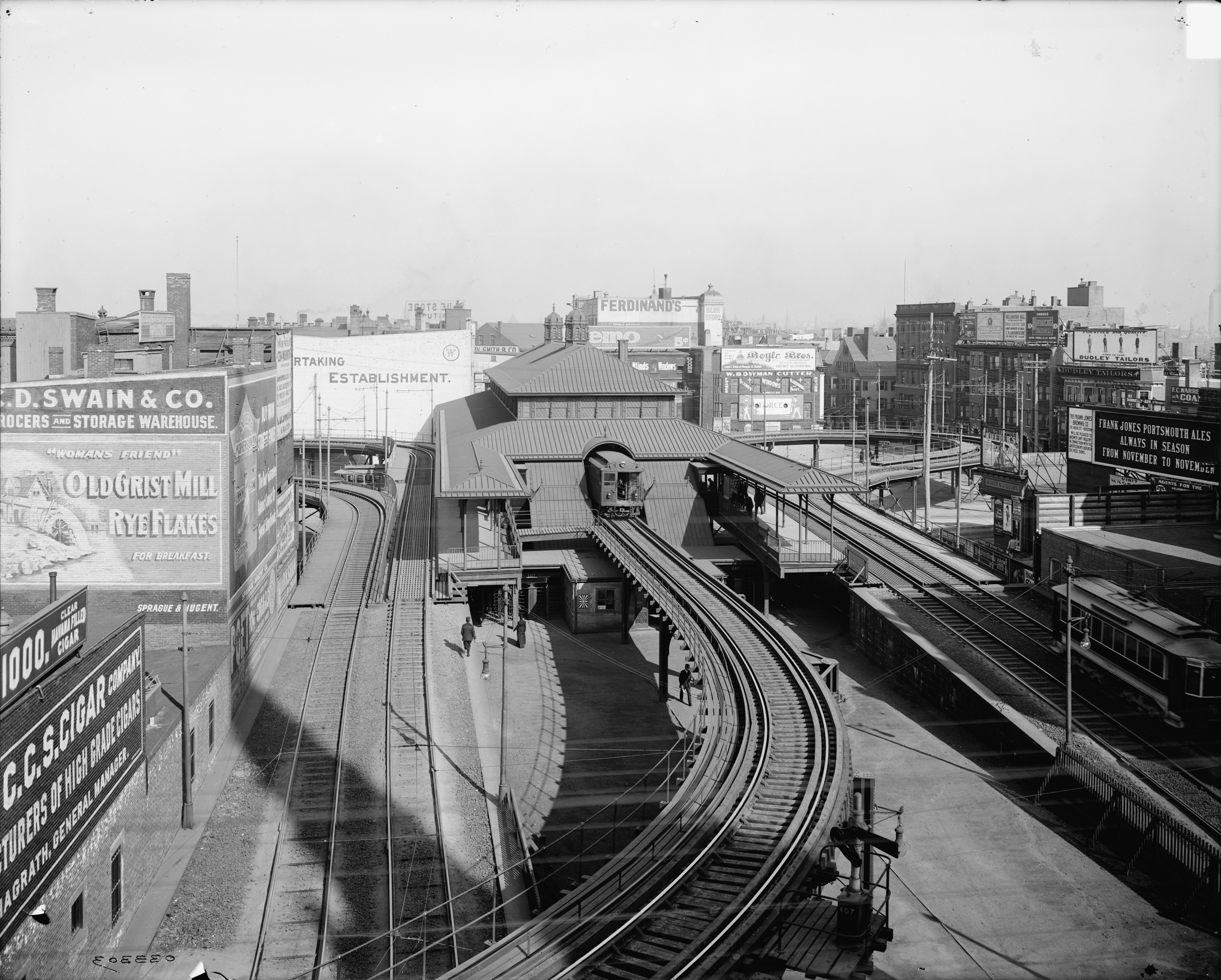
Looking north at the former elevated station's northbound platforms in 1904, with the streetcar loops on each side; an elevated train can be seen in the station, while a streetcar is visible using the right-hand loop and another is using the street-level tracks beneath the left-hand loop.

The Boston Elevated Railway opened its Main Line Elevated on June 10, 1901. The line ran from Sullivan Square on the Charlestown Elevated, through the Tremont Street subway, and on the Washington Street Elevated to a southern terminal located at Dudley Square. Along with the rest of the Washington Street Elevated, Dudley Street Terminal was designed by Alexander Wadsworth Longfellow Jr. It featured a Beaux Arts-style waiting area, clad in copper with an internal arched structure.

Like many BERy stations, Dudley Street Terminal was designed for efficient transfers between streetcars and subway trains. Many streetcar routes that had operated to downtown (some into the Tremont Street subway) were curtailed to Dudley, where two elevated loops offered cross-platform transfers to Main Line trains, using platforms on both sides of the northbound track. Other streetcars – largely on crosstown routes that did not terminate at Dudley – stopped at street-level platforms underneath the elevated station. On December 2, 1905, the Old Colony Street Railway began operating through service between Dudley and Quincy.

=== Modifications and decline ===
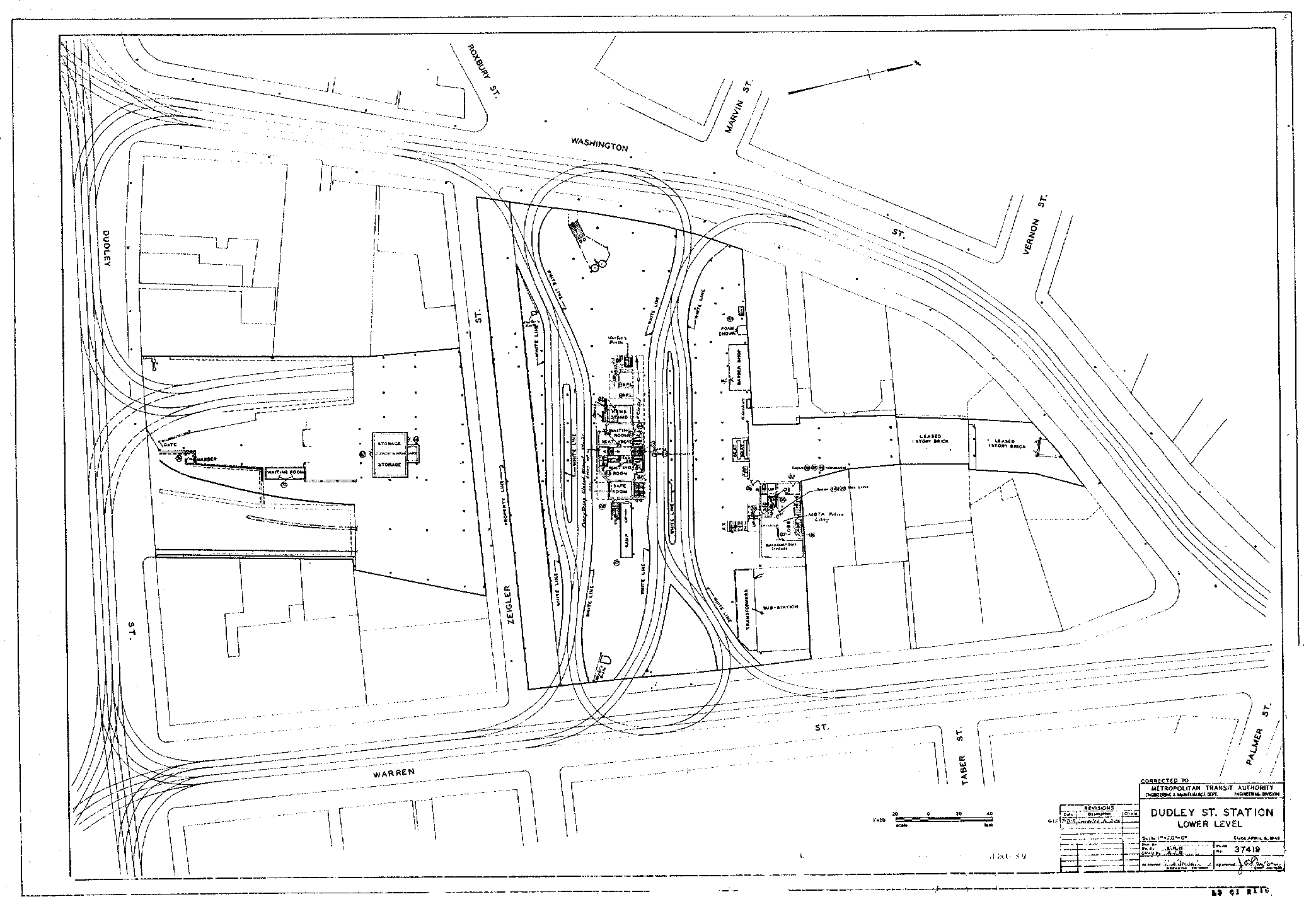
Plan of the lower level in 1949, after changes to support trolleybus operations

The Washington Street Elevated was extended south to Forest Hills on November 22, 1909. The loop allowing trains to return downtown from Dudley was kept (as some trains were short-turned at Dudley), and a new southbound platform was added. In 1910, the elevated streetcar loops were expanded and roofed to handle larger-than-expected crowds. Dudley quickly became overcrowded; in 1917, a streetcar transfer area was built at Egleston to the south and some streetcar routes diverted there.

As streetcar routes were bustituted during the 1940s and 1950s, the streetcar platforms were modified for use by buses and trackless trolleys. The east loop was completely rebuilt over a six-month period for trolleybus operations, reopening on December 25, 1948. The Main Line Elevated was renamed the Orange Line in 1967.

From 1979 to 1987, the Southwest Corridor was rebuilt, with 2 Orange Line and 3 commuter rail tracks in a trench replacing a 4-track embankment. Trains last ran on the Elevated on April 30, 1987, and the relocated Orange Line opened on May 4, 1987.

=== Modern reuse ===
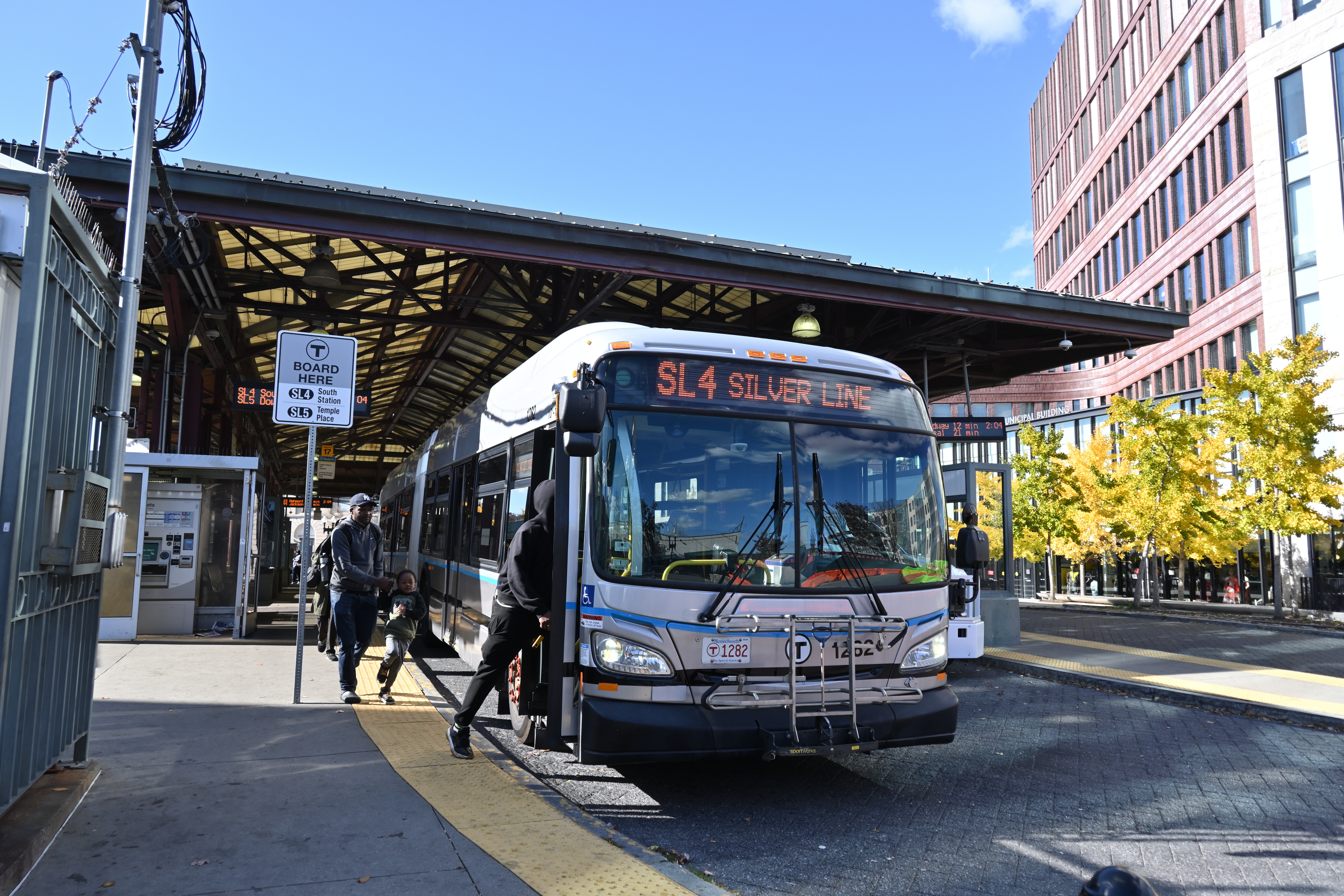
A Silver Line bus at Nubian station in 2024. After plans for light rail, ultimately the Silver Line bus service replaced the Elevated.

Even without the Elevated, Dudley Square remained a major bus transfer location. After several years, the former Elevated station was converted into a new bus station. The 784,000-pound (356,000 kg) station building was lowered 12 feet (3.7 m) to the ground and rolled 180 feet (55 m) to the south. The original station building covers north–south oriented bus platforms A, B, and C; new shelters in a similar style were built for east–west platforms D, E, and F. When completed in late 1993, the new Dudley Square bus station served over 10,000 daily passengers, with over 100 buses per hour stopping at peak times.

When the Washington Street Elevated was removed, the MBTA originally promised to run light rail service over its former route. After 15 years of debate and changing plans, the Washington Street section of the Silver Line bus rapid transit system opened on July 20, 2002. It ran between Dudley and Downtown Crossing, replacing the 49 bus (albeit with increased frequency and other rapid-transit-like features). On October 13, 2009, this service was re-designated the SL5; a new SL4 service was added between Dudley and South Station, sharing most of the route of the SL4.

With the December 2019 renaming of Dudley Square to Nubian Square, community leaders stated they would seek to have the station renamed. In February 2020, the MBTA agreed to rename the station to Nubian Square. The renaming took effect in June 2020.

=== Future plans ===
Dudley Square was a proposed stop on the Urban Ring – a circumferential bus rapid transit (BRT) line designed to connect the existing radial MBTA rail lines to reduce overcrowding in the downtown stations. Under draft plans released in 2008, a spur of the Urban Ring would have run on Washington Street from Melnea Cass Boulevard, using the existing Silver Line platforms at Dudley. The project was cancelled in 2010.

The closing of the Washington Street Elevated in 1987, which also closed the Dudley Square elevated station, prompted a 2012 review; the Roxbury-Dorchester-Mattapan Transit Needs Study, recommended for some form of proposed replacement rail service to access southern Metro Boston neighborhoods—one option being studied within this review would re-use the Tremont Street subway's now-unused southern Pleasant Street tunnel coming from the Green Line's Boylston station to eventually run a light rail line to, and likely beyond Nubian Square to the south. The new light rail service proposed in the 2012 review, to replace the rapid transit access the Elevated previously provided, could go from Nubian Square as far south as the Red Line's Mattapan station, with a northern turnaround terminus at Government Center.

The MBTA plans to reconfigure the platforms and reverse the direction of buses through the station. An estimated $2.2 million construction project was put out to bid in April 2026. Bids were higher than the estimate, and a $3.9 million contract was awarded in August 2026.
