= Nubian Square =

Commercial center in Roxbury, Boston, US

- {{{other_names}}}
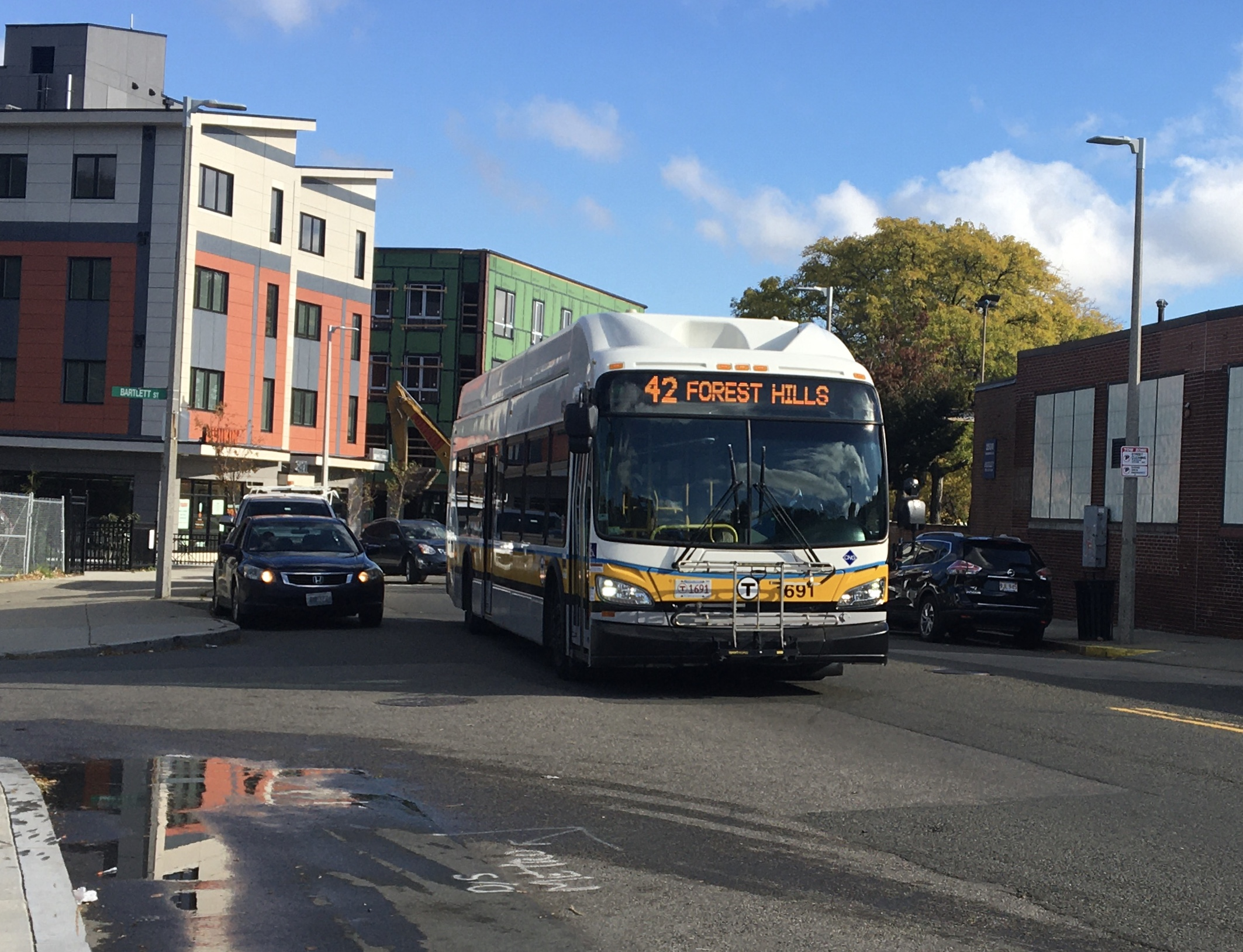
- An MBTA bus in the area of Nubian Square in 2019
- Named for: Nubia
- Location: Roxbury, Boston, Massachusetts, United States
- Intersection: Washington Street, Malcolm X Boulevard, Dudley Street, Guild Row
- Interactive map of Nubian Square
- Coordinates: 42°19′45″N 71°5′8″W

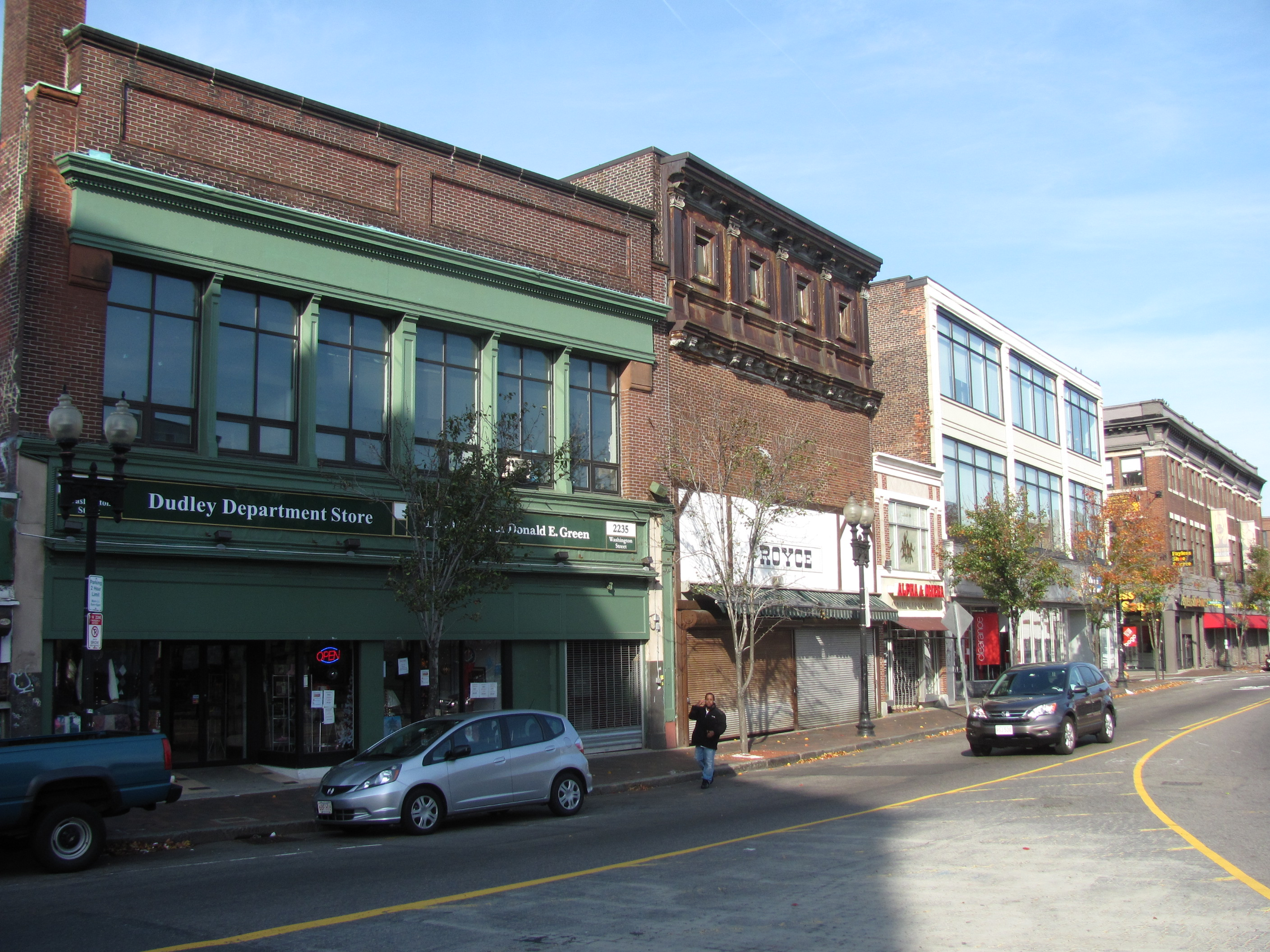
Dudley Department Store

Nubian Square (formerly Dudley Square) is the primary commercial center of the Roxbury neighborhood of Boston, Massachusetts, located at the intersection of Dudley Street and Washington Street. It has long been the center of African American culture in Boston, prior to which the area was primarily Jewish.

For most of the twentieth century, the square was a multi-mode transportation hub, centered at Dudley station, now Nubian station of the Washington Street Elevated, which closed in 1987. Several streetcar lines radiated to surrounding neighborhoods from the elevated station. It is now a substantial bus terminal and terminus for the MBTA's bus rapid transit Silver Line.

== History ==
In the colonial and post-revolutionary periods, Washington Street was the only connection between Shawmut Peninsula, on which Old Boston was located, and the mainland. Nubian Square is located on the mainland side of what was the Washington Street isthmus, an area known as The Neck. At the time, it was known as Dudley Square. Notable development began in Roxbury in the 19th century, and Nubian Square served as a commercial center in this period. As Boston introduced streetcar service through the Boston Elevated Railway, Dudley Square station was opened in 1901, leading to another boom in Dudley Square's importance and reinforcing its status as a community hub.

After the Boston Elevated Railway's reorganization into the Metropolitan Transit Authority in 1947, streetcar service to Dudley Square Square was curtailed and replaced with bus service through the 1950s and 1960s. In addition, the Southwest Expressway was planned to run through Roxbury, and attempts to relocate the Dudley Square community to make way for the project led to the displacement of many residents, the destruction of much of Dudley Square's community, and tensions with Boston City authorities. The process of replacing the streetcar service with bus service was completed in 1987, with the closure of the Washington Street Elevated. Around this time, Dudley Square entered a period of reinvestment, as key community buildings, such as the post office, were rebuilt and others, such as the Roxbury Boys and Girls Club and Palladio Hall, were restored.

=== Name change ===
The square was originally named after Thomas Dudley, a colonial magistrate who served several terms as governor of the Massachusetts Bay Colony. An effort to rename the square was led by a local community group, the Nubian Square Coalition. The proposed name came from the region, now in Egypt and Sudan, that was the seat of one of the earliest civilizations of ancient Africa. Proponents noted that Dudley was "a leading politician in 1641", when the colony became the first to legally sanction slavery. Other reasons included resisting gentrification and rebuilding a sense of community ethnic identity around the square; and honoring the long-time local business A Nubian Notion, which had been in the square for 50 years.

Roxbury-based newspaper The Bay State Banner had supported a name change, although noted in an editorial that Nubians had owned slaves, too. Byron Rushing, former president of the Museum of African American History in Boston, noted, “I’ve really searched, and I’ve found no evidence that Dudley ever owned slaves."

A non-binding advisory question was added to the November 5, 2019, municipal election ballot for all Boston residents asking, "Do you support the renaming/changing of the name of Dudley Square to Nubian Square?" Approximately 54% of votes cast on the question were in opposition, while approximately 46% were in favor. Although the question was defeated, it "passed in the surrounding areas" near the square, and Mayor of Boston Marty Walsh subsequently announced that the proposal would be considered further by the city's Public Improvement Commission. On December 19, 2019, the Public Improvement Commission unanimously approved changing the name of Dudley Square to Nubian Square. The name change is recorded in Boston's street register, but there is no physical city signage displaying either the old or the new name of the square. The Nubian Square Coalition stated that they would next pursue a name change of Dudley Square station, a bus station in the square. In mid-February 2020, it was announced that the station would be renamed to Nubian Station.
