= Magoun Square station =

Light rail station in Somerville, Massachusetts, US

Magoun Square
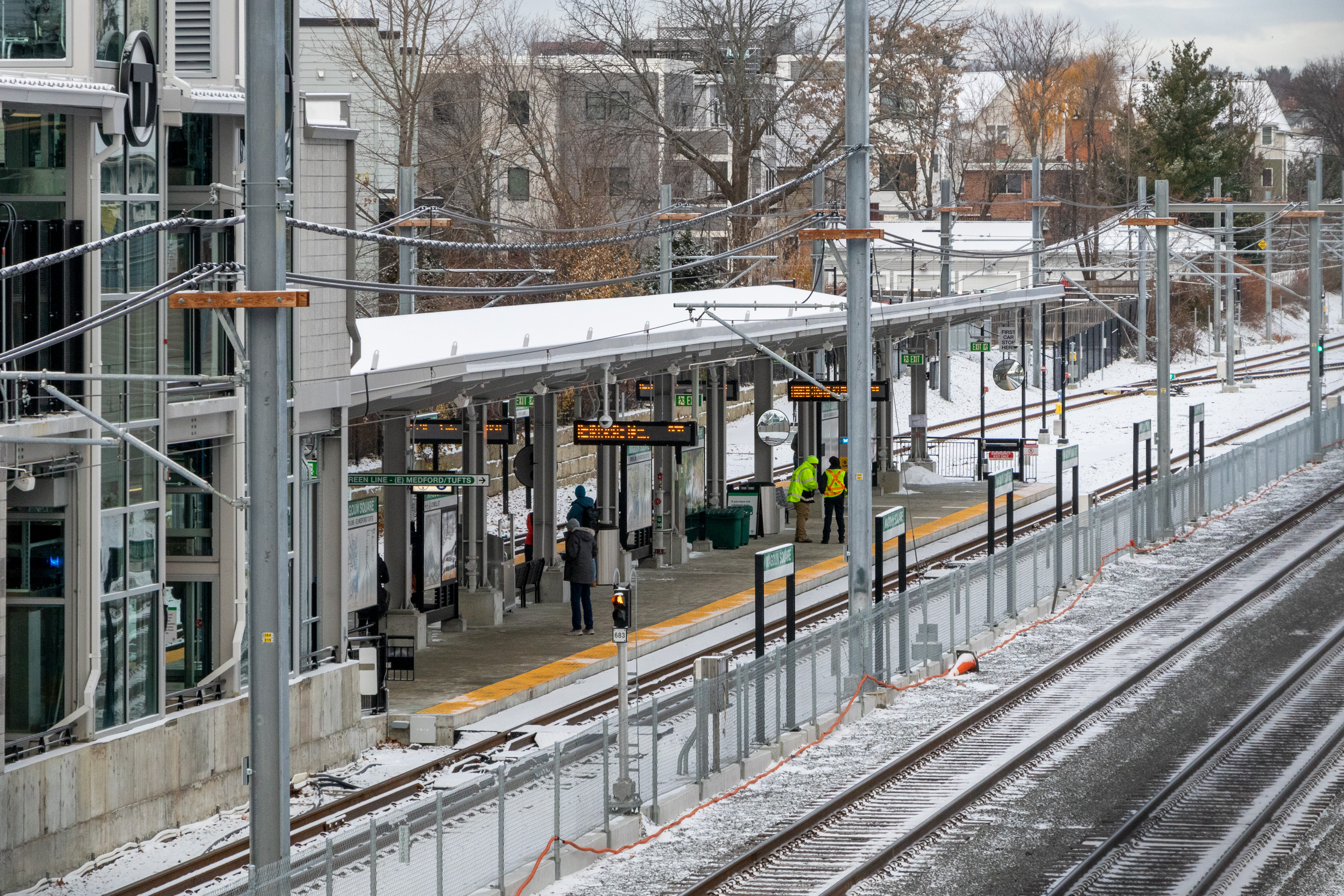
- Magoun Square station on first day of service, December 2022

General information
- Location: Lowell Street at Vernon Street; Somerville, Massachusetts
- Coordinates: 42.39412°N 71.10670°W
- Line: Medford Branch
- Platforms: 1 island platform

Construction
- Cycle facilities: 36-space "Pedal and Park" bicycle cage 16 spaces on racks
- Accessible: Yes

History
- Opened: December 12, 2022

Passengers
- 2030 (projected): 1,260 daily boardings

Services
Preceding station	MBTA	Following station
Ball Square toward Medford/Tufts	Green Line E branch	Gilman Square toward Heath Street
Former services (Somerville Junction station)
Preceding station	Boston and Maine Railroad	Following station
North Somerville toward Concord, NH	Boston – Concord, NH	Winter Hill toward Boston
Somerville Highlands toward Lowell or Reformatory	Lexington Branch	Winter Hill toward Boston
Somerville Highlands toward Northampton	Central Mass Branch	Winter Hill toward Boston
Location

Magoun Square station is a light rail station on the Massachusetts Bay Transportation Authority (MBTA) Green Line located at Lowell Street south of Magoun Square in Somerville, Massachusetts. The accessible station has a single island platform serving the two tracks of the Medford Branch. It opened on December 12, 2022, as part of the Green Line Extension (GLX), which added two northern branches to the Green Line, and is served by the E branch.

The location was previously served by railroad stations. The Boston and Lowell Railroad (B&L) opened Taylor's Ledge station at Central Street by the early 1850s. It was rebuilt in 1854 and renamed Somerville Centre around that time. A cutoff from West Cambridge to Somerville Centre was built in 1870, and a new station building was constructed in 1872. It was renamed Somerville Junction in the 1890s, and rebuilt again in 1898. The station was served by the Boston and Maine Railroad, successor to the B&L, until the 1940s.

Extensions to the Green Line were proposed throughout the 20th century, most with Somerville Junction as one of the intermediate stations. A Lowell Street station to the northwest of the former station site was officially chosen for the GLX in 2008. Cost increases triggered a wholesale reevaluation of the GLX project in 2015. A scaled-down station design was released in 2016, with the station renamed Magoun Square. A design and construction contract was issued in 2017. Construction of Magoun Square station began in early 2020 and was largely completed by late 2021.

== Station design ==
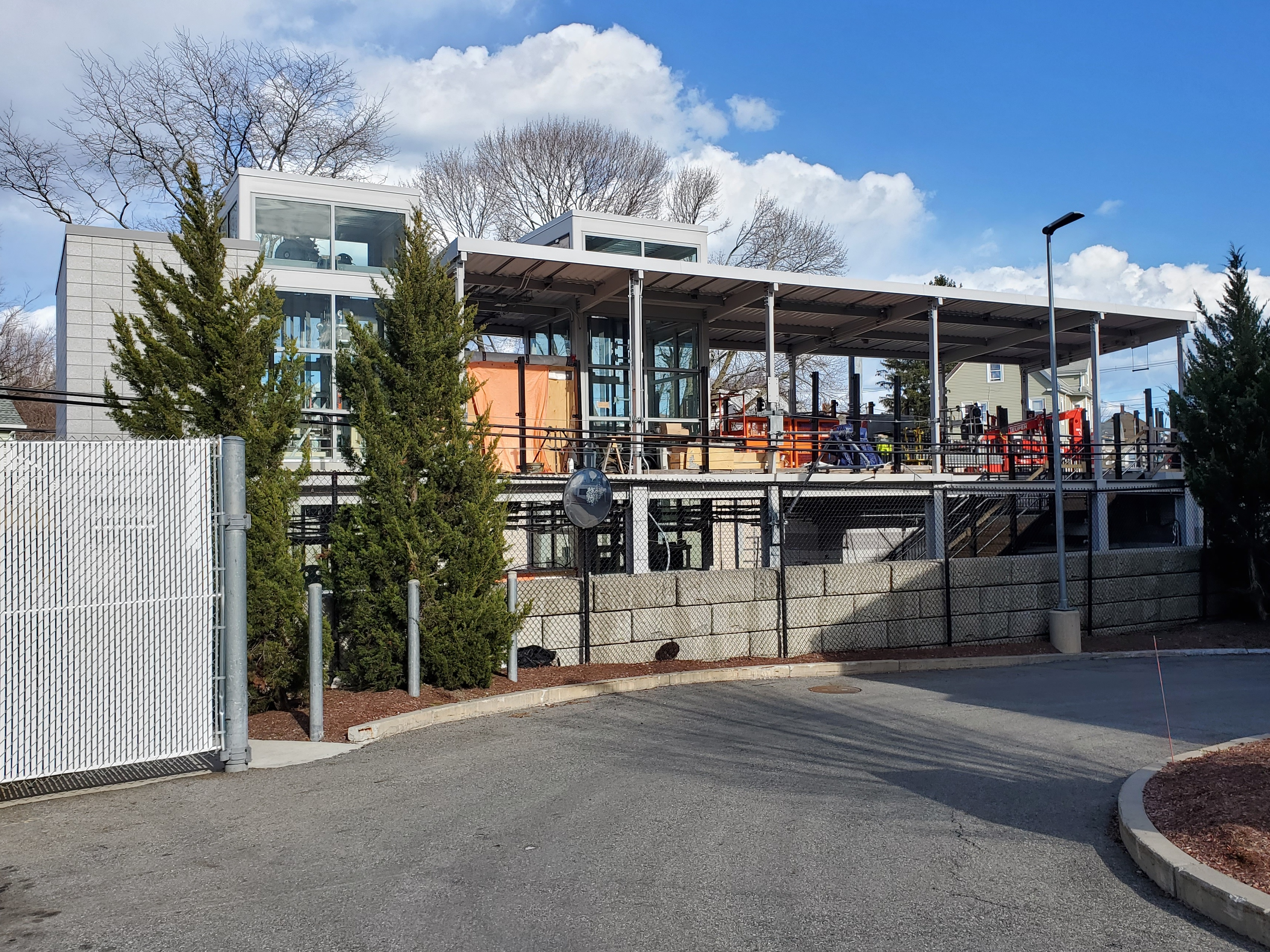
The headhouse under construction in March 2022

Magoun Square station is located off Lowell Street near Vernon Street in Somerville, about 1,500 feet (460 m) south of Magoun Square. The Lowell Line runs roughly northwest–southeast through the station area, with the two-track Medford Branch of the Green Line on the south side of the Lowell Line tracks.

The station has a single island platform, 225 feet (69 m) long and 22.5 feet (6.9 m) wide, between the Green Line tracks. A canopy covers the full length of the platform. The platform is 8 inches (200 mm) high for accessible boarding on current light rail vehicles (LRVs), and can be raised to 14 inches (360 mm) for future level boarding with Type 9 and Type 10 LRVs. It is also provisioned for future extension to 300-foot (91 m) length. The tracks and platform are located below street level.

The platform is located northwest of Lowell Street, with a sloped footbridge connecting Lowell Street to the station headhouse. The headhouse has stairs and two elevators for accessibility. A 36-space "Pedal and Park" bike cage and 16 bike racks are located on the footbridge next to Lowell Street. An emergency exit is located at the northwest end of the platform. Public art at the station includes Unfolding Light by Aaron Stephen – sculptural lighting over the footbridge – as well as graffiti-style murals on panels on station signs. The Somerville Community Path crosses under Lowell Street and joins the Medford Branch southeast of the station.

== History ==
=== Railroad station ===
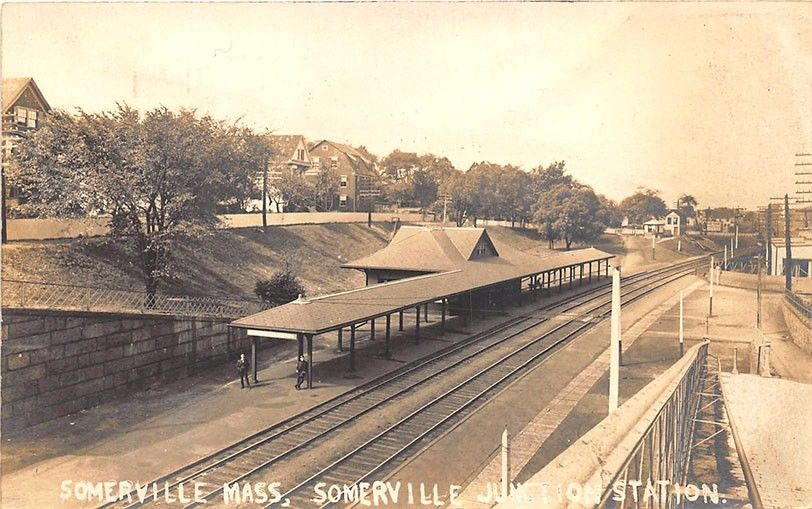
Somerville Junction station around 1907

The Boston and Lowell Railroad (B&L) opened between its namesake cities in 1835; local stops were added after several years. By 1850, Taylor's Ledge station was located west of Central Street in Somerville. It was named for a nearby slate ledge opened when the railroad was built. In April 1852, the station building was the target of an attempted arson. A new station building was built in 1854; soon after, the station was renamed Somerville Centre at the request of nearby residents.

The bridge carrying Central Street over the tracks was widened in 1868. In 1870, the B&L built a new cutoff from West Cambridge through West Somerville to near Somerville Centre, allowing Lexington Branch trains to enter Boston over the B&L mainline. A new station building was constructed in 1872. The name was shortened to Somerville around 1879, though "Somerville Centre" was still commonly used. (Note: For example, an 1884 map and 1894 newspaper article.) The Massachusetts Central Railroad (later the Central Massachusetts Railroad) began service in 1881, also using the cutoff and the B&L to reach Boston. By 1885, the junction between the cutoff and the B&L mainline was known as Somerville Junction.

In 1887, the B&L was leased by the Boston and Maine Railroad (B&M) as its Southern Division. The stone arch bridge carrying Central Street was replaced by a steel truss bridge in 1889. The 1893–94 opening of North Union Station, with ticket sellers serving three B&M divisions plus the Fitchburg Railroad, generated confusion between the different Somerville stations. The station was renamed Somerville Junction around 1894. A new station building with a long canopy was opened in December 1898.

A pair of bridges carrying Lowell Street over the Southern Division mainline and the cutoff were built in 1910. This reestablished Lowell Street as a thoroughfare, as it had dead-ended at the tracks since the 1870s. Laurin A. Woodward was station agent from 1871 to the 1920s; in 1921, his 50 years of such work were believed to be the longest in New England. Passenger service from the Lexington Branch and the Central Mass Branch was rerouted over the Fitchburg Division on April 24, 1927, with the cutoff becoming a freight-only line.

The Somerville Junction station building was abandoned by the early 1930s, though some Southern Division trains still stopped. The B&M received permission to close the stop in 1939, though some service lasted into the 1940s. (Note: Passenger service lasted at least until 1942. The station did not appear in 1946 or subsequent timetables, though it did appear in a 1947 tariff.) The west portion of the cutoff was abandoned in April 1980 for construction of the Red Line Northwest Extension, followed by the east portion in 1983. A short segment remained to serve an industrial customer near Somerville Junction; it was abandoned in 2007. The Lowell Street bridge was closed in 2000 and rebuilt in 2005–06. In 1990, the MBTA installed new drainage to reduce flooding at Somerville Junction during rainstorms.

=== Green Line Extension ===
==== Previous plans ====
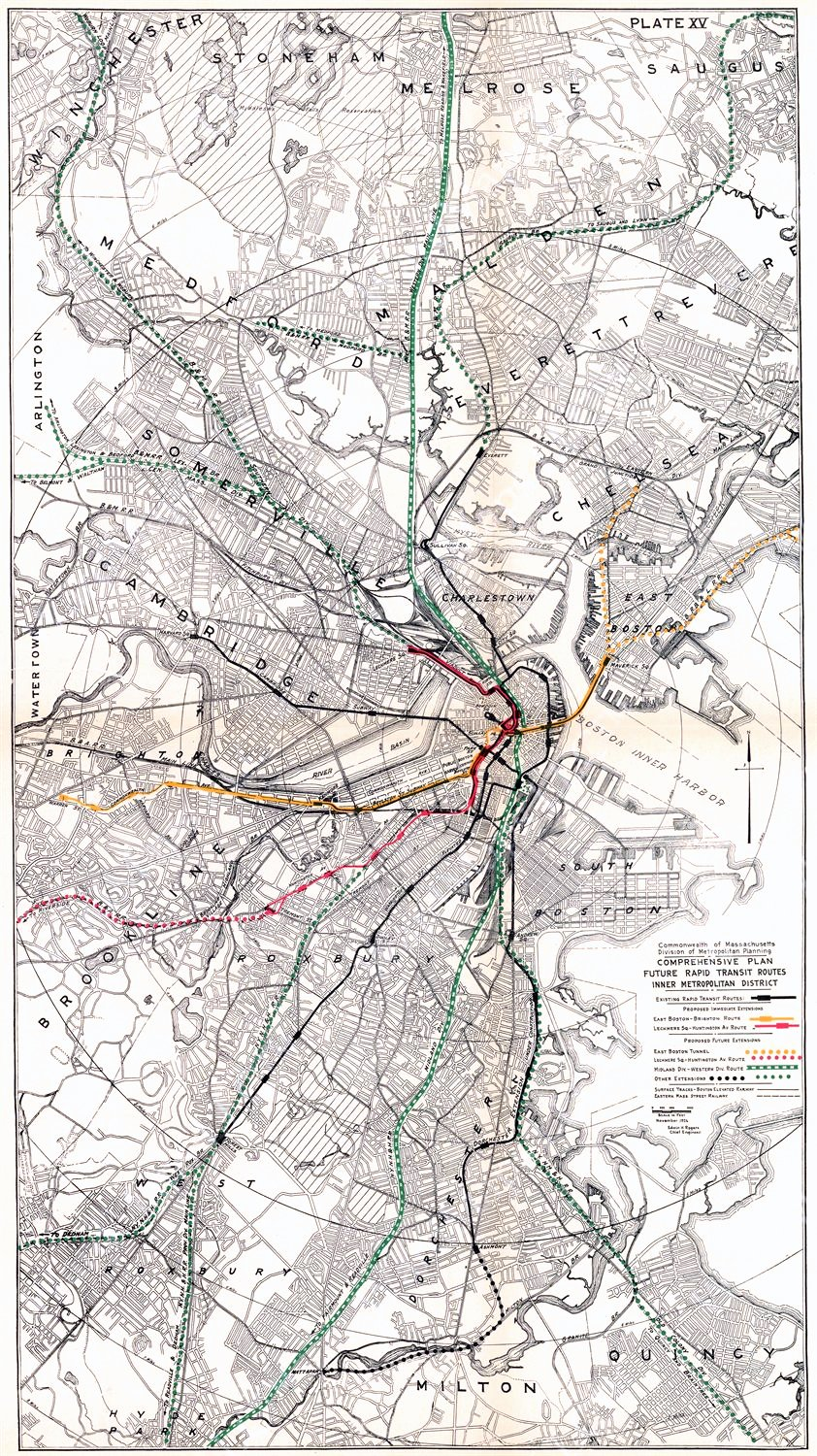
Map showing the 1926-proposed extensions northwest from Lechmere (at left)

The Boston Elevated Railway (BERy) opened Lechmere station in 1922 as a terminal for streetcar service in the Tremont Street subway. That year, with the downtown subway network and several radial lines in service, the BERy indicated plans to build three additional radial subways: one paralleling the Midland Branch through Dorchester, a second branching from the Boylston Street subway to run under Huntington Avenue, and a third extending from Lechmere Square northwest through Somerville.

The Report on Improved Transportation Facilities, published by the Boston Division of Metropolitan Planning in 1926, proposed extension from Lechmere to North Cambridge via the Southern Division and the 1870-built cutoff. Consideration was also given to extension past North Cambridge over the Lexington Branch, and to a branch following the Southern Division from Somerville Junction to Woburn. Somerville Junction was initially planned to be the location of the rapid transit terminal and yard, with streetcars from Massachusetts Avenue and Davis Square running over the cutoff to the terminal. The land planned for the terminal was purchased and developed in 1925, and so the final plan called for rapid transit the full distance to North Cambridge. Somerville Junction was to be the site of an intermediate station in this plan, as well as subsequent variants.

In 1945, a preliminary report from the state Coolidge Commission recommended nine suburban rapid transit extensions – most similar to the 1926 plan – along existing railroad lines. These included an extension from Lechmere to Woburn over the Southern Division, again with Somerville Junction as an intermediate stop, though without use of the Fitchburg Cutoff. The 1962 North Terminal Area Study recommended that the elevated Lechmere–North Station segment be abandoned. The Main Line (now the Orange Line) was to be relocated along the B&M Western Route; it would have a branch following the Southern Division to Arlington or Woburn.

The Massachusetts Bay Transportation Authority (MBTA) was formed in 1964 as an expansion of the Metropolitan Transit Authority to subsidize suburban commuter rail service, as well as to construct rapid transit extensions to replace some commuter rail lines. In 1965, as part of systemwide rebranding, the Tremont Street subway and its connecting lines became the Green Line. The 1966 Program for Mass Transportation, the MBTA's first long-range plan, listed a short extension from Lechmere to Washington Street as an immediate priority, with a second phase reaching to Mystic Valley Parkway (Route 16) or West Medford.

The 1972 final report of the Boston Transportation Planning Review listed a Green Line extension from Lechmere to Ball Square as a lower priority, as did several subsequent planning documents. In 1980, the MBTA began a study of the "Green Line Northwest Corridor" (from Haymarket to Medford), with extension past Lechmere one of its three topic areas. Extensions to Tufts University or Union Square were considered.

==== Station planning ====
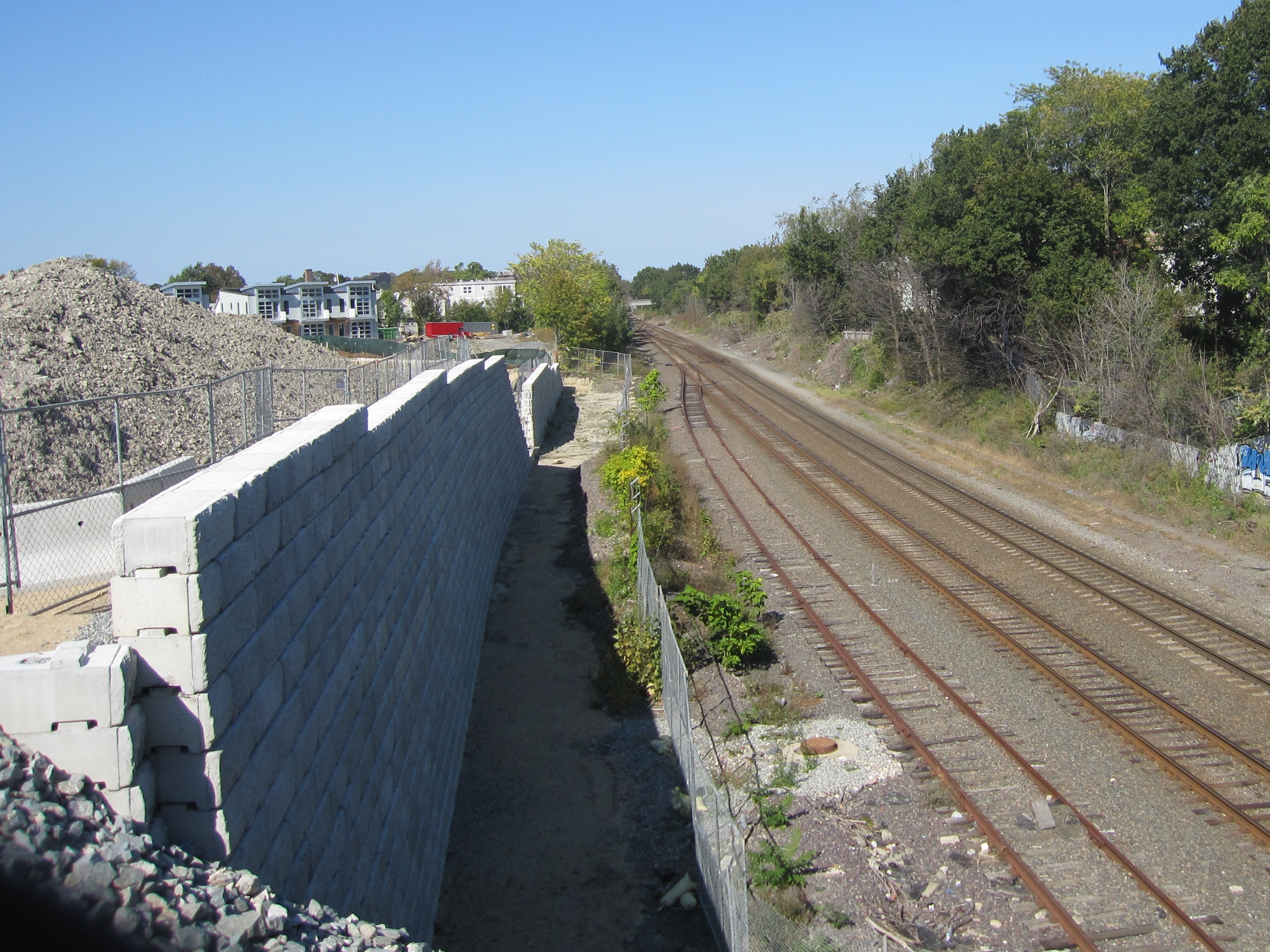
The planned station site in 2011

In 1991, the state agreed to build a set of transit projects as part of an agreement with the Conservation Law Foundation (CLF), which had threatened a lawsuit over auto emissions from the Central Artery/Tunnel Project (Big Dig). Among these projects was a "Green Line Extension To Ball Square/Tufts University", to be complete by the end of 2011. No progress was made until an updated agreement was signed in 2005. The Beyond Lechmere Northwest Corridor Study, a Major Investment Study/alternatives analysis, was published in 2005. The analysis studied a variety of light rail, bus rapid transit, and commuter rail extensions, all of which included a Lowell Street station about 1,200 feet (370 m) northwest of the former Somerville Junction station site. The highest-rated alternatives all included an extension to West Medford with Lowell Street as one of the intermediate stations.

The Massachusetts Executive Office of Transportation and Public Works submitted an Expanded Environmental Notification Form (EENF) to the Massachusetts Executive Office of Environmental Affairs in October 2006. The EENF identified a Green Line extension with Medford and Union Square branches as the preferred alternative. That December, the Secretary of Environmental Affairs issued a certificate that required analysis of Lowell Line stations at Tufts University and Gilman Square in the draft environmental impact report (DEIR) for the Green Line Extension (GLX). A Lowell Street commuter rail station had been considered in the Beyond Lechmere commuter rail alternatives, but analysis of one was not included in the certificate.

Planned station sites were announced in May 2008. Locations on both sides of the Lowell Street bridge were considered for Lowell Street station; southeast of the bridge was locally preferred to allow a connection with the Somerville Community Path. However, northwest of the bridge was chosen to avoid a curved platform and the need to take adjacent property. The DEIR, released in October 2009, concurred with the northwest site. Preliminary plans in the DEIR called for the station to have a single island platform. A headhouse with stairs, an escalator, and two elevators would connect to the Lowell Street bridge. Construction of the Maxwell's Green transit oriented development on a former industrial site next to the planned station began in 2011.

Updated plans shown in June 2011 expanded the street-level entrance plaza and added an emergency exit from the northwest end of the platform. Plans presented in February 2012 modified the entrance plaza and added a bike cage. By late 2012, the portion of the Medford Branch from Gilman Square station to College Avenue was expected to be completed by June 2019. A further update in June 2013 relocated the bike cage and removed a mechanical penthouse from the headhouse. Design was then paused while Phase 2/2A stations (Lechmere, Union Square, and East Somerville) were prioritized, as they were scheduled to open sooner than the rest of the GLX. Design resumed in fall 2014 and reached 90% by June 2015.

==== Redesign ====
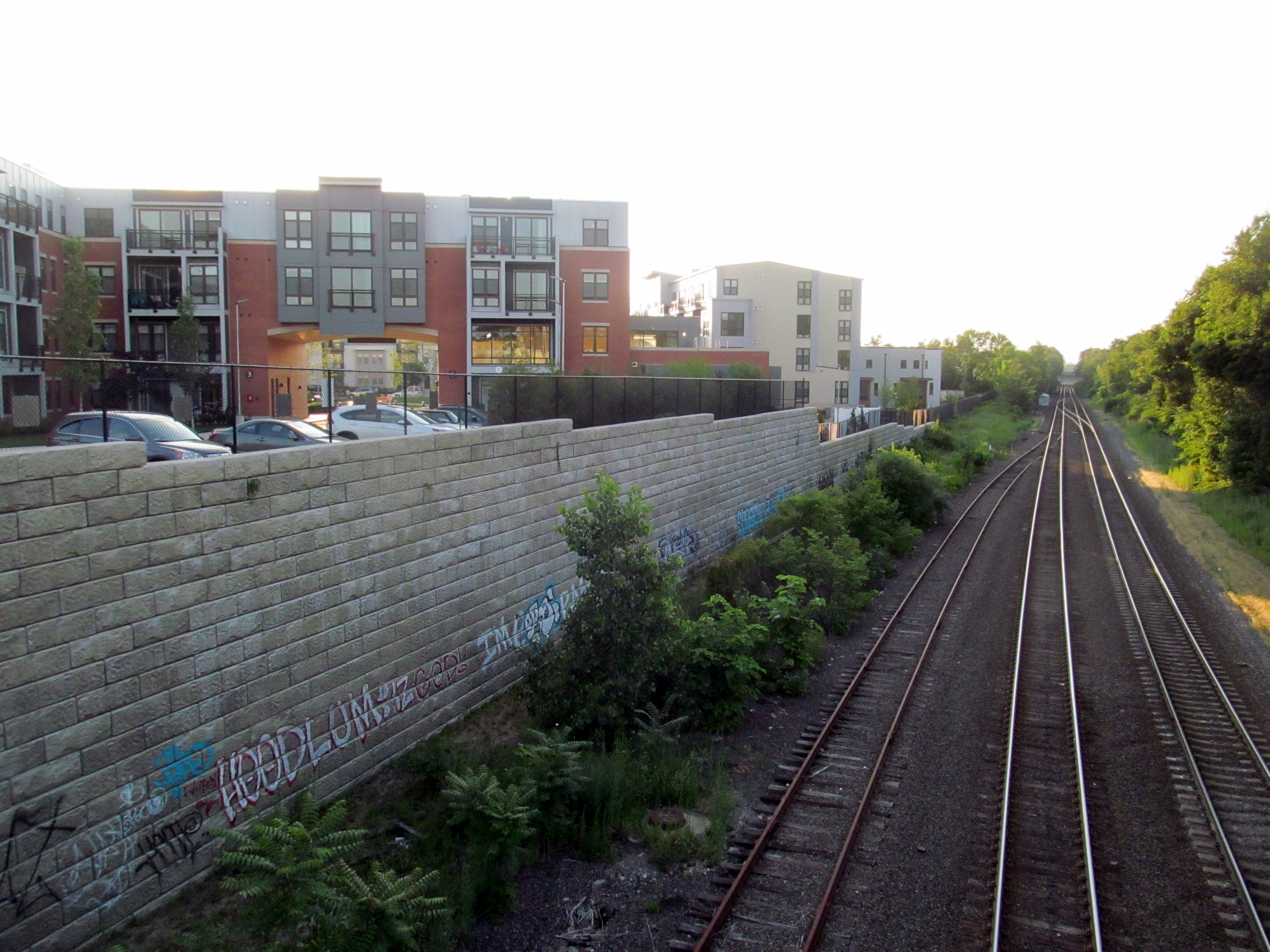
The planned station site in 2015

In August 2015, the MBTA disclosed that project costs had increased substantially, triggered a wholesale re-evaluation of the GLX project. In December 2015, the MBTA ended its contracts with four firms. Construction work in progress continued, but no new contracts were awarded. At that time, cancellation of the project was considered possible, as were elimination of the Union Square Branch and other cost reduction measures. In May 2016, the Massachusetts Department of Transportation and MBTA boards approved a modified project that had undergone value engineering to reduce its cost. Stations were simplified to resemble D branch surface stations rather than full rapid transit stations, with canopies, faregates, escalators, and some elevators removed. Lowell Street station, previously planned to have two elevators, was reduced to one.

In December 2016, the MBTA announced a new planned opening date of 2021 for the extension. Lowell Street station was renamed Magoun Square after the nearby Magoun Square neighborhood. A design-build contract for the GLX was awarded in November 2017. The winning proposal included six additive options – elements removed during value engineering – including full-length canopies at all stations and a second elevator at Lowell Street. Station design advanced from 0% in March 2018 to 44% that December and to 80% in October 2019.

==== Construction ====
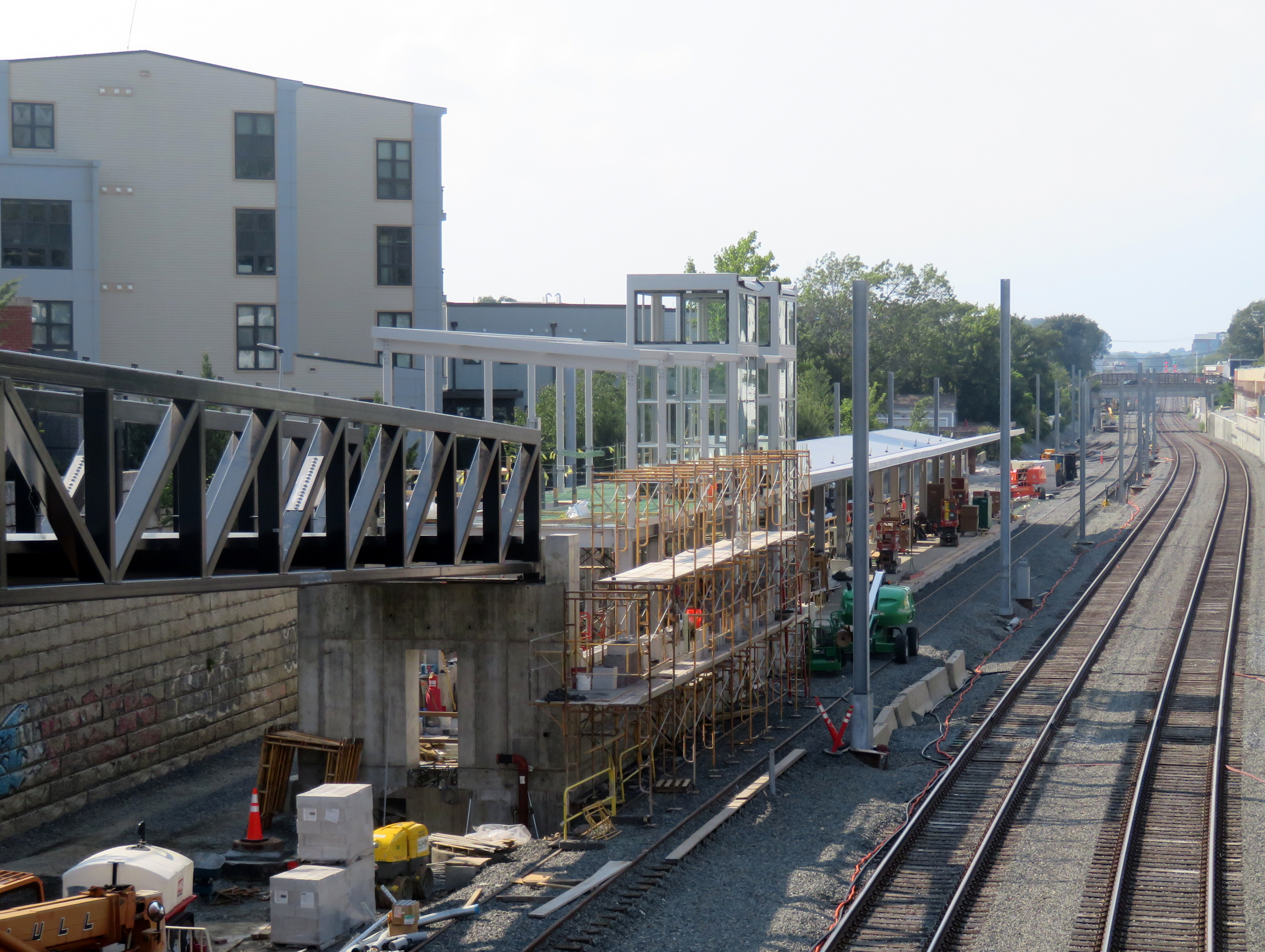
Station construction in July 2021

One abutment of the Lowell Street bridge was moved in 2020 to provide space for the Green Line tracks; unlike with several other bridges along the corridor, this did not require a closure of the bridge to traffic. The foundation for the platform was built in July and August 2020, with concrete pouring under way by November 2020. The platform itself was poured in early 2021, with the steelwork for the canopy erected by April. The first elevator shaft was placed on April 10, 2021, followed soon after by the second. The footbridge between Lowell Street and the headhouse was placed on June 19, 2021.

Original plans called for the D branch to be extended to Medford/Tufts. In April 2021, the MBTA indicated that the Medford branch would instead be served by the E branch. By March 2021, the station was expected to open in December 2021. In June 2021, the MBTA indicated an additional delay, under which the station was expected to open in May 2022. In February 2022, the MBTA announced that the Medford Branch would open in "late summer". Train testing on the Medford Branch began in May 2022. In August 2022, the planned opening was delayed to November 2022. The Medford Branch, including Magoun Square station, opened on December 12, 2022.
