= Mystic Valley Parkway station =

Proposed light rail station in Medford, Massachusetts

Mystic Valley Parkway
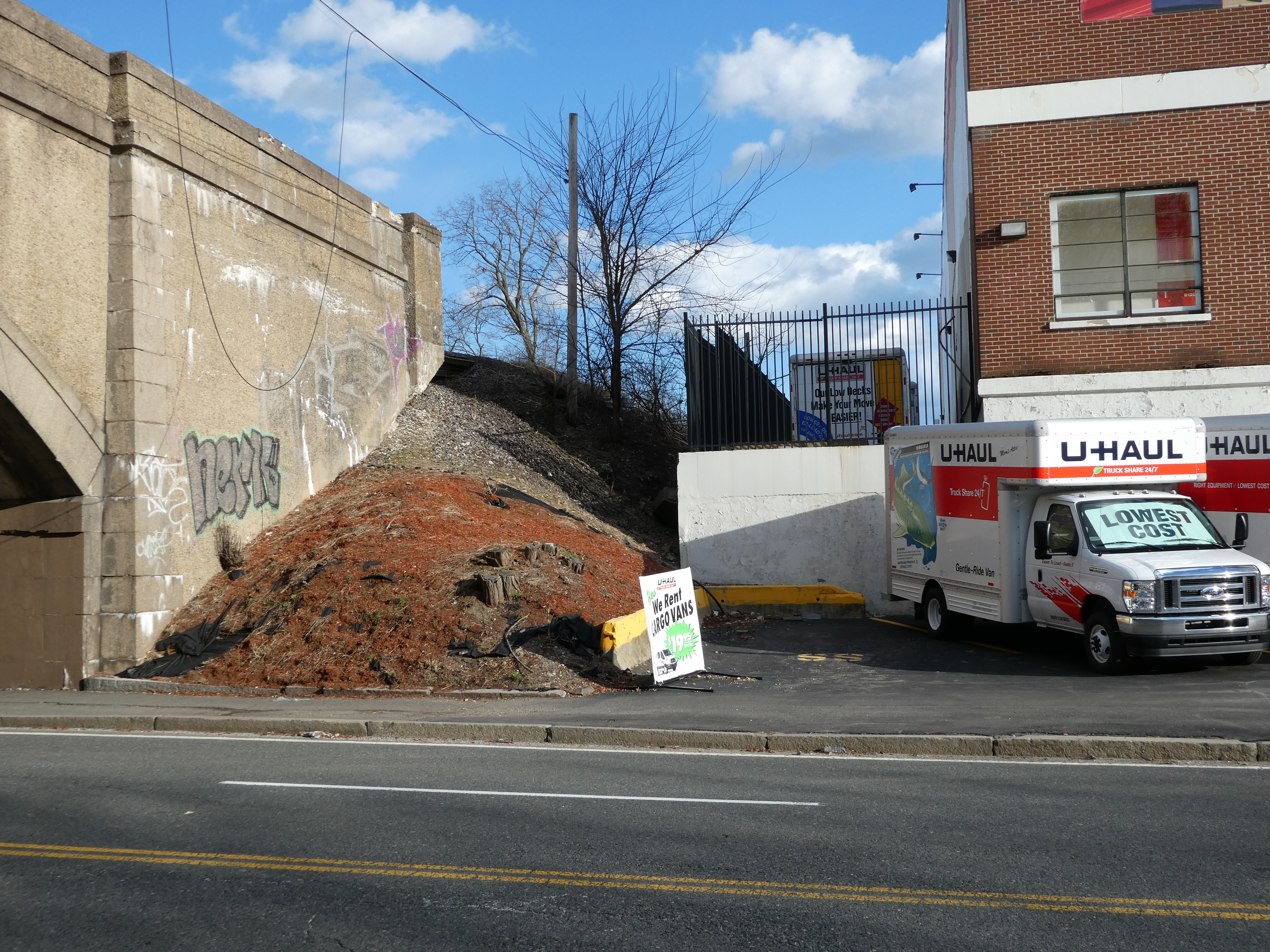
- The proposed station site in March 2022

General information
- Location: Mystic Valley Parkway (Route 16); Somerville, Massachusetts
- Coordinates: 42°25′0.85″N 71°7′39.11″W
- Line: Medford Branch
- Platforms: 1 island platform (Green Line)
- Tracks: 2 (Green Line); 2 (Lowell Line)

Proposed services
Preceding station	MBTA	Following station
Terminus	Green Line E branch	Medford/Tufts toward Heath Street
Former services at Medford Hillside
Preceding station	Boston and Maine Railroad	Following station
West Medford toward Concord, NH	Boston – Concord, NH	Tufts College toward Boston
Location

Mystic Valley Parkway station (also called Route 16 station) is a proposed light rail station on the MBTA Green Line in Somerville, Massachusetts; it would be built as part of a future third phase of the Green Line Extension (GLX). Route 16 would consist of one island platform, which would serve the E branch's two tracks.

== History ==
=== Railroad station ===
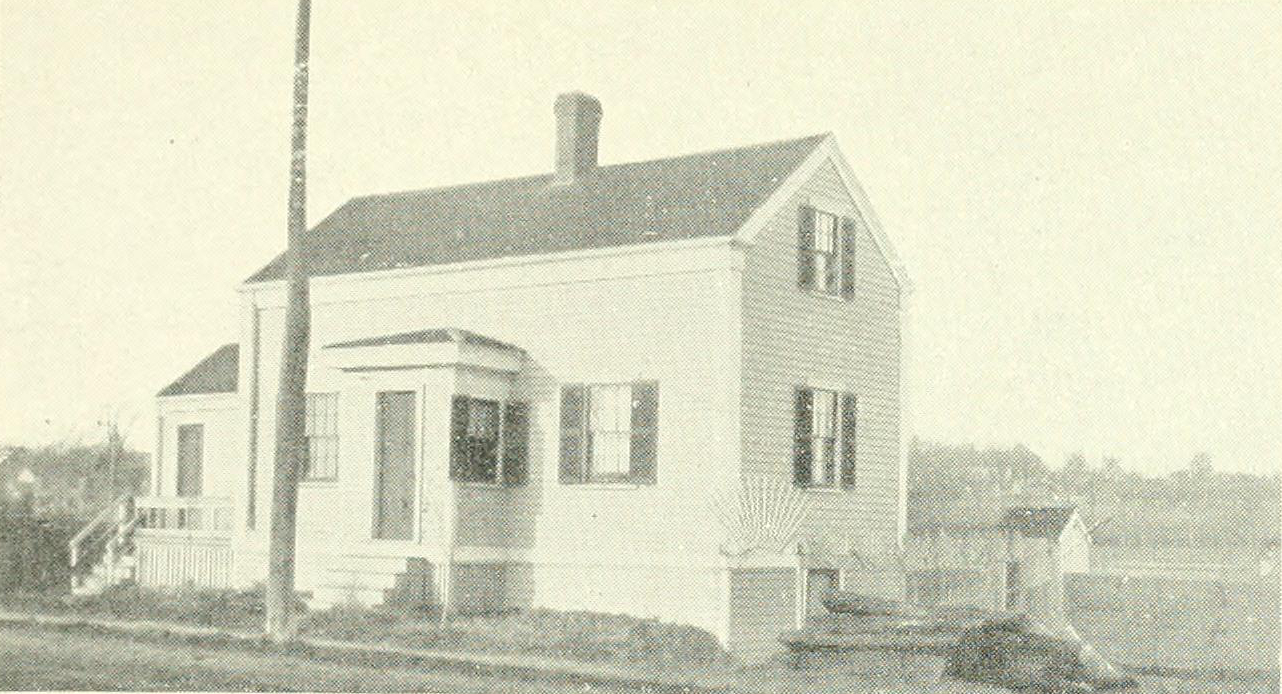
Medford Steps station prior to 1875

The Boston and Lowell Railroad opened through Somerville and Medford in 1835. It crossed the Middlesex Canal south of West Medford; the canal failed after the railroad's completion and it was filled in the 1850s. The original wooden bridge over the Mystic River at West Medford was replaced in 1852 with a stone arch bridge, which was later encased in concrete. A reinforced concrete arch bridge of similar style was built just to the south in 1907–08 during construction of the Mystic Valley Parkway. Completed at a cost of $30,000 (equivalent to $760,000 in 2025), it is 136 feet (41 m) long and 34 feet (10 m) wide, carrying the tracks 30 feet (9.1 m) above the parkway.

Local passenger stops were gradually added on the line. Medford Steps station at South Street (now Winthrop Street) was a stop for Woburn Branch local trains by 1846. The first waiting room was the front room of an existing house. It was named for the lengthy set of steps to reach the tracks from Walnut Hill. A new station building was built on the southwest side of the tracks around 1875. The railroad planned to call it Walnut Hill, but yielded to local requests for the name Medford Hillside. "Walnut Hill" signs already made for the station were reused for a flag stop in Woburn. The name was changed to Medford Hillside around August 27, 1876; three other stations on the line were also renamed.

Frederick Stark Pearson became station agent in 1877 at age 16 after the death of his father, an engineer who had worked on the railroad. He served as agent until around 1880; he took classes at Tufts College the latter two years, with special permission from college president Elmer Hewitt Capen to leave classes to sell tickets. The former station building was moved to Auburn Street in West Medford around 1892, then moved again to nearby Cotting Street due to construction of the Mystic Valley Parkway.

The Winthrop Street bridge adjacent to the station was rebuilt in 1920 as part of a street widening project. The station building, as well as wooden sidewalks on the bridge, was damaged by a fire on September 21, 1946. Located in a cut at the bottom of College Hill, the tracks at the station were blocked by debris during heavy storms on several occasions. Rocks and dirt washed onto the tracks by rains from Hurricane Diane caused a Budd RDC to derail at the station on August 18, 1955.

On April 18, 1958, the Public Utilities Commission approved a vast set of cuts to Boston and Maine Railroad commuter service, including the closure of North Somerville, Tufts College, and Medford Hillside stations. The three stations were closed on May 18, 1958, amid the first of a series of cuts. The former station building is no longer extant.

=== Green Line station ===
In 1991, the state agreed to build a set of transit projects as part of an agreement with the Conservation Law Foundation (CLF), which had threatened a lawsuit over auto emissions from the Central Artery/Tunnel Project (Big Dig). Among these projects was a "Green Line Extension To Ball Square/Tufts University", to be complete by the end of 2011.

The planned Green Line station was dropped from the list of stations that will open in 2022, in favor of the E branch terminating at Medford/Tufts station at College Avenue. The state successfully argued that this satisfied their legal commitment to mitigate the air pollution impact of the Big Dig by (among other projects) extending the Green Line to Medford Hillside.

In 2011, the Boston MPO decided to allocate funding in the 2016-2020 time period for further extension of the Green Line from College Ave to Route 16. However, this funding was reallocated to the main project after major cost overruns created a budget crisis. A Route 16 station is still in the state's plans, with environmental review proceeding, as of 2017.

In 2017, the MBTA filed a Notice of Project Change for a state environmental review of its revised design for a Green Line station at Mystic Valley Parkway (Route 16). While a station at this location was included in the original environmental review for the Green Line extension, the MBTA came up with a lower cost design that has the station at ground level. The previous design had a two-story station with a platform on the level of the adjacent commuter rail tracks, which are elevated to cross the Mystic River. The new station would include enclosed bicycle parking, but no automobile parking.
