= Bicycling and the MBTA =

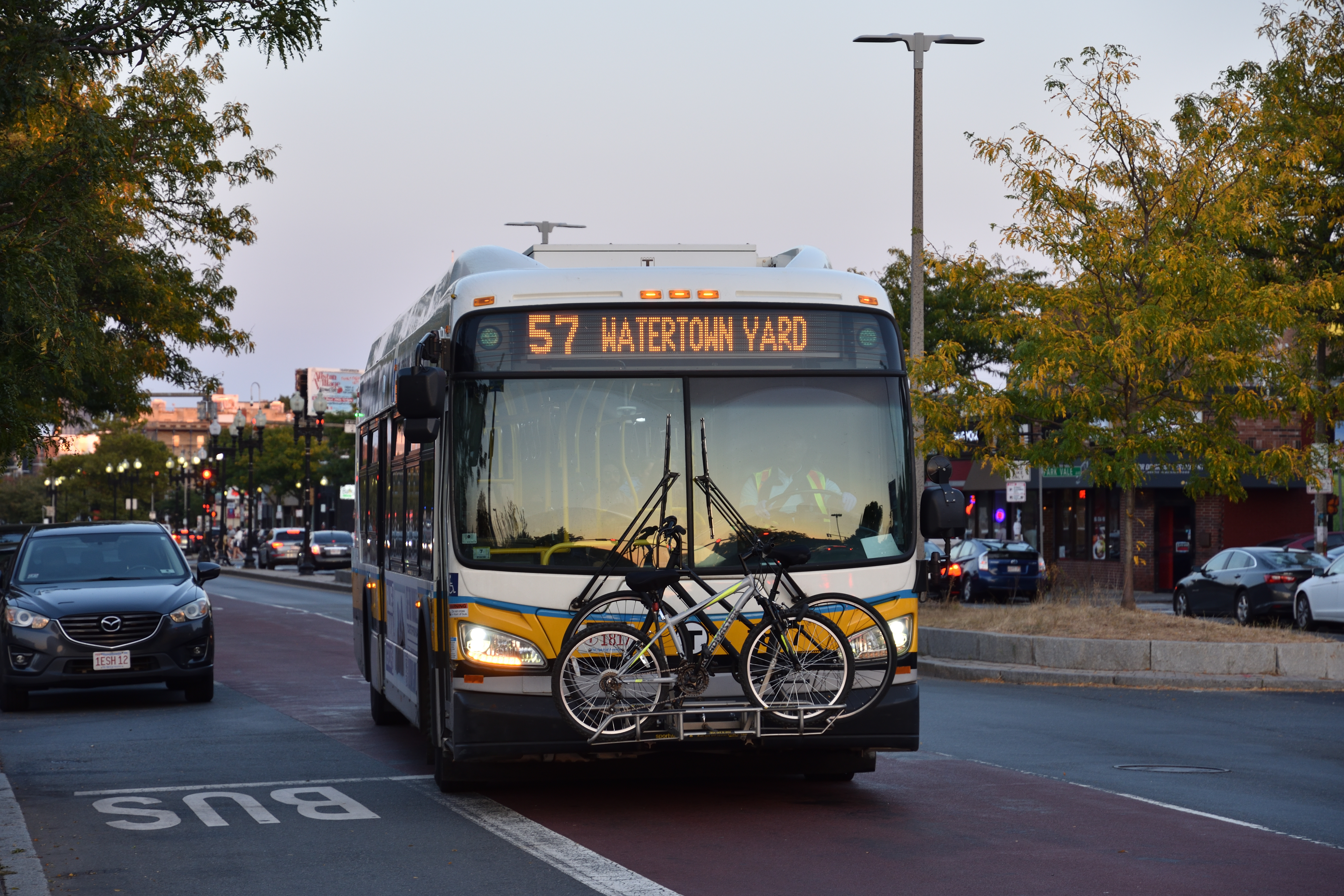
An MBTA bus carrying two bicycles on its bicycle rack

The Massachusetts Bay Transportation Authority operates subway, bus, commuter rail, and ferry service in the Greater Boston region. Boston has some of the highest rates of non-motorized commuting in the United States, including high bicycle usage. The MBTA offers certain provisions for riders wishing to make part of their trips by bicycle. The agency allows bicycles to be carried on all fixed-route services except the Green Line and the Mattapan Line light rail lines, although they are restricted on the commuter rail and heavy rail subway services at peak hours. Bicycle storage areas are offered at many stations, with "Pedal and Park" locking bicycle cages at certain high-usage stations.

== MBTA policies ==
Standard non-folding bicycles are permitted on most MBTA service, though they may be restricted at peak hours:

Service	Bicycles permitted	Restrictions
Bus	Yes	Exterior bicycle racks are available on all MBTA buses. Each rack holds two bicycles. Standard bicycles are not allowed inside buses.
Silver Line SL1, SL2, and SL3	No	
Silver Line SL4 and SL5	Yes	Exterior bicycle racks are available except on electric buses #1295-1299. Each rack holds two bicycles. Standard bicycles are not allowed inside buses.
Blue Line	Yes	No bicycles allowed inbound 7–9am or outbound 4–6pm on weekdays
Green Line	No	
Orange Line	Yes	No bicycles allowed 7–10am and 4–7pm on weekdays
Red Line	Yes	No bicycles allowed 7–10am and 4–7pm on weekdays
Mattapan Line	No	
MBTA Commuter Rail	Yes	Bikes are allowed on the Greenbush, Kingston, Fall River/New Bedford, and Fairmount trains at all times. They are allowed on other lines except on certain peak-hour trains.
MBTA ferry	Yes	

Folding bicycles are allowed on all MBTA vehicles at all times provided they are fully folded before going through faregates or entering vehicles.

Bicycles are not allowed to be transported through the transfer stations at Park Street, Downtown Crossing, and Government Center at any times due to crowding in narrow corridors in the old stations. Motorized vehicles and bicycle trailers are not permitted. The MBTA states that "bicycles may also be prohibited during holidays..., special events, service disruptions, and other periods when crowding or special conditions exist."

Full-sized bicycles were temporarily prohibited on weekend and Halloween Newburyport/Rockport Line trains in October 2024, due to high passenger volumes to Salem.

== Bicycle storage and theft at stations ==
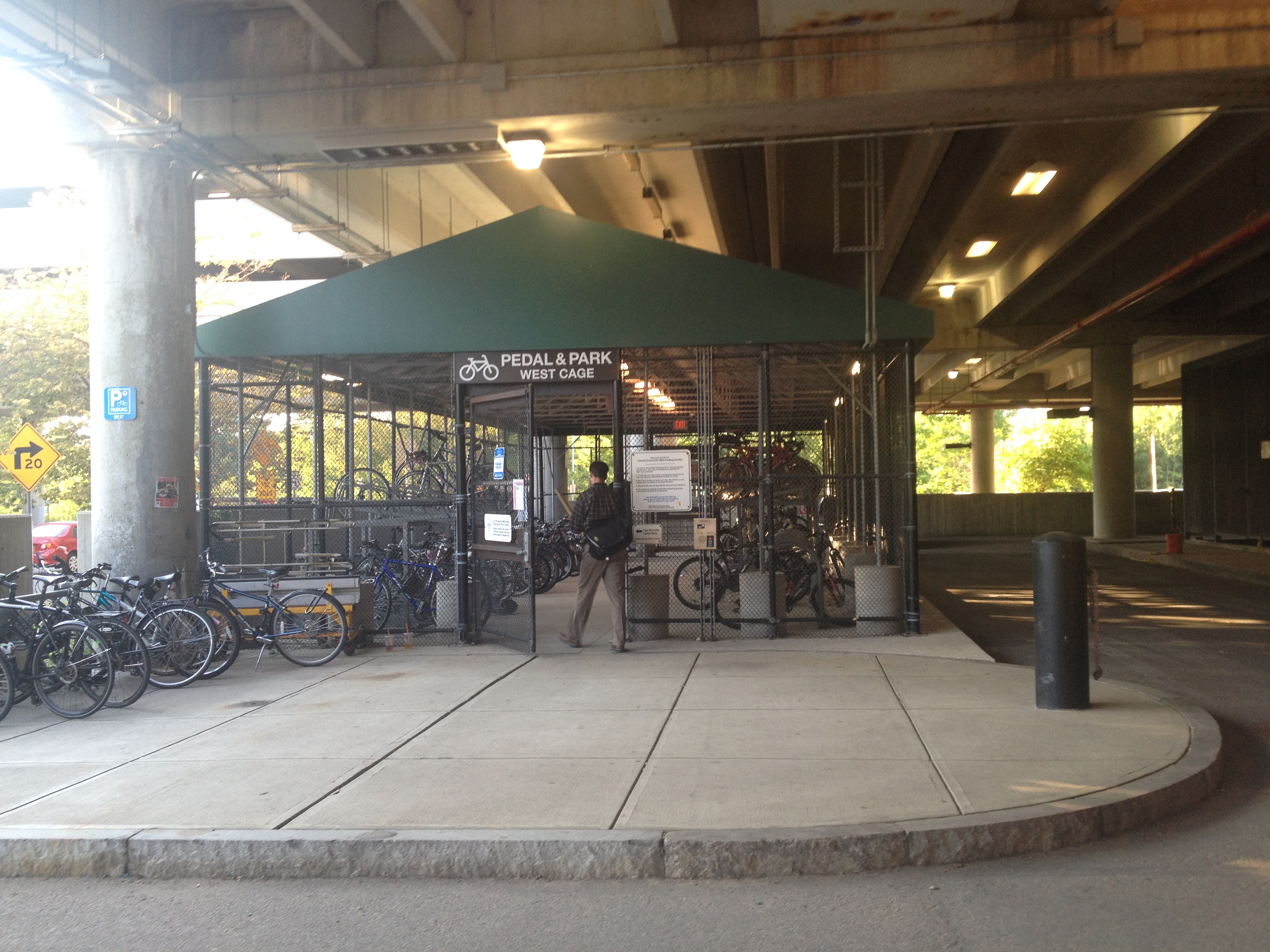
One of three Pedal and Park cages at Alewife station

Most (over 95%) MBTA stations have bicycle racks available. A number of commuter rail and subway stations, as well as the bus stations at Arlington Heights and Watertown Square, have covered bicycle parking areas. A small number, including South Acton, have individual bicycle lockers. The first bike racks on the system were installed at 22 stations in 1989.

=== Pedal and Park cages ===
A small number of MBTA stations have "Pedal and Park" cages, which allow for more secure bicycle storage than normal open racks. Each cage includes racks for 50 to 150 bicycles, six security cameras, lighting, and a police intercom system, with the intent of deterring bicycle thefts. As of August 2024, 14 stations have cages:

- Commuter Rail: Beverly Depot, Salem
- Blue Line: Wonderland
- Orange Line: Back Bay, Forest Hills, Malden Center, Oak Grove
- Red Line: Alewife (3 cages), Ashmont, Braintree, Davis, South Station, Wollaston
- Silver Line: Nubian

Additionally, seven Green Line stations (Union Square, Lechmere, Medford/Tufts, Ball Square, Magoun Square, Gilman Square, and East Somerville) were built with cages that are not opened.

As bicycling increased in popularity in the early 2000s in Boston, bicycle thefts from MBTA stations became more common. 199 thefts were reported in 2011, up from around 100 in 2007 and 70 in 2003. The first two Pedal and Park cages were installed at Alewife in September 2008 to serve commuter bikers from the busy Minuteman Bikeway, followed shortly after by one at Forest Hills. In 2013, the Alewife cages made headlines after MBTA Transit Police installed a cardboard cutout of a police officer in one as a psychological deterrent to theft.

In 2011, the MBTA received a federal grant to add more cages, for which local advocacy group MassBike was brought in as a design consultant. The first new cage opened at Oak Grove in April 2013, followed by a dozen others over the next year. Originally, a CharlieCard or special Bike CharlieCard would open cages; after May 2013, users were required to register their CharlieCard with the MBTA to gain access. The cage at Salem, opened in January 2015, was the first at an MBTA station without rapid transit service. Although the cages have reduced bicycle theft on the MBTA, occasional thefts do still occur inside them.

== Blue Bikes ==
Blue Bikes, a municipal bikesharing service in Boston, Cambridge, Somerville, and Brookline, does not have docking stations on MBTA property and no official attempt is made to connect the two systems. However, many MBTA stations and bus stops in the four municipalities have nearby Blue Bikes docks.

== Bicycle coaches ==
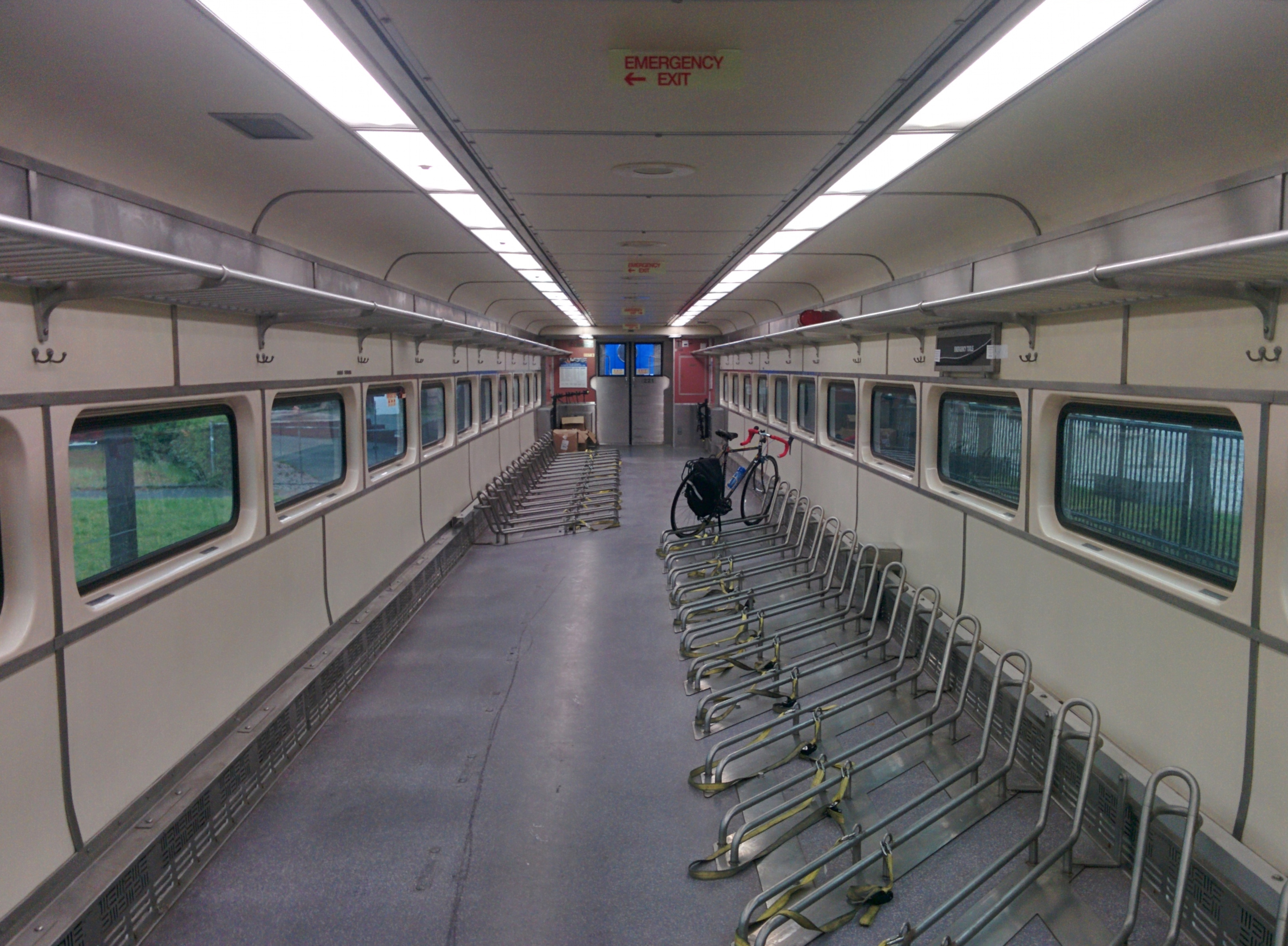
Bicycle coach #221

Two MBTA Commuter Rail cars are modified to hold bicycles - one entirely for bicycles, and another with half the space remaining as seating - and a third is planned to modified similarly. On weekends between Memorial Day and Labor Day, one of the cars runs on the Newburyport/Rockport Line and the other on the CapeFLYER service to Cape Cod.

== Trail connections ==
Some MBTA stations offer direct connections to off-street trails and bicycle paths, many of which are rail trails built on former railroad rights of way.

=== Alewife-centered trails ===
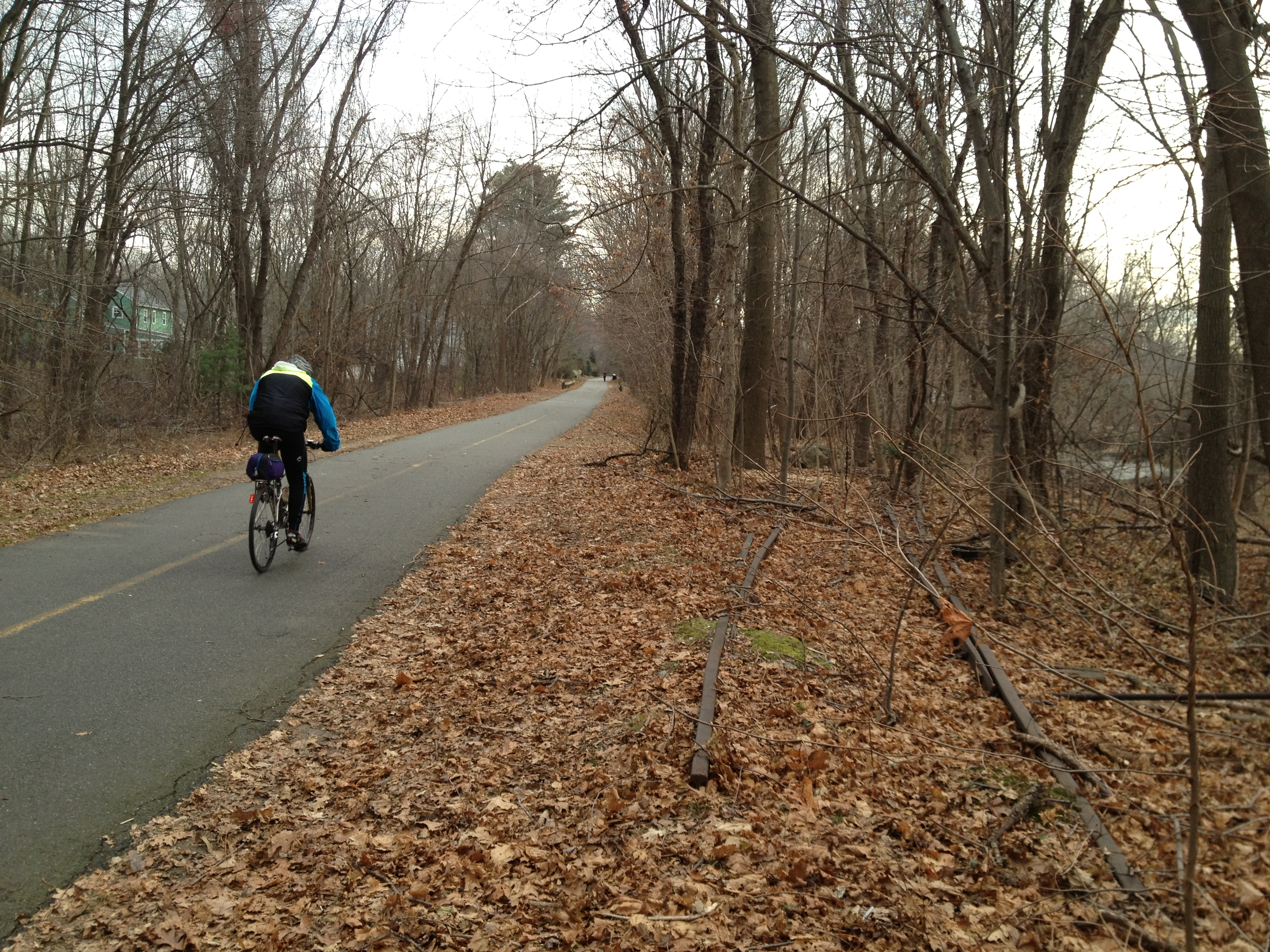
Former tracks from the Lexington Branch alongside the Minuteman Commuter Bikeway in Lexington

After Lexington Branch commuter rail service ceased in 1977 and the Red Line Northwest Extension was terminated at Alewife due to opposition in Arlington, the Minuteman Commuter Bikeway was built on the right of way from Alewife to Bedford Depot. It opened to East Arlington in 1992 and to Alewife in 1998. The Minuteman serves as a major commuter trunkline, with hundreds of riders per day using it to reach the Red Line.

Two additional paths follow the former Fitchburg Cutoff: the Fitchburg Cutoff Trail west to Brighton Street, and the Somerville Community Path east to Davis station and beyond. As part of the Green Line Extension, the Community Path was extended from its former Lowell Street terminus to Lechmere, with direct access to stations at Lowell Street, Gilman Square, Washington Street, and Lechmere.

=== Other trails ===
Other trails, mostly suburban, offer access from MBTA stations:

- Assabet River Rail Trail: terminates at South Acton
- Bruce Freeman Rail Trail: connects to West Concord
- Charles River Bike Path: multiple connections including Science Park, Charles/MGH, and Waltham
- Chelsea Greenway: follows the Silver Line busway from Eastern Avenue to Bellingham Square
- Clipper City Rail Trail: terminates at Newburyport
- Cochituate Rail Trail: will terminate at Natick Center
- East Boston Greenway: follows the Blue Line from Maverick to Constitution Beach
- Lower Neponset River Trail: parallels much of the Mattapan Line
- Mass Central Rail Trail—Wayside: near Kendal Green and Waltham
- Nashua River Rail Trail: terminates at Ayer
- Seaside Trail: terminates at Plymouth
- Southwest Corridor Park: follows the Southwest Corridor (carrying the Orange Line and Commuter Rail) from Back Bay to Forest Hills
- Tri-County Greenway: connects to Wedgemere and Winchester Center
- Whitney Spur Rail Trail: terminates at Cohasset
