= Medford/Tufts station =

Light rail station in Medford, Massachusetts, US

Medford/Tufts
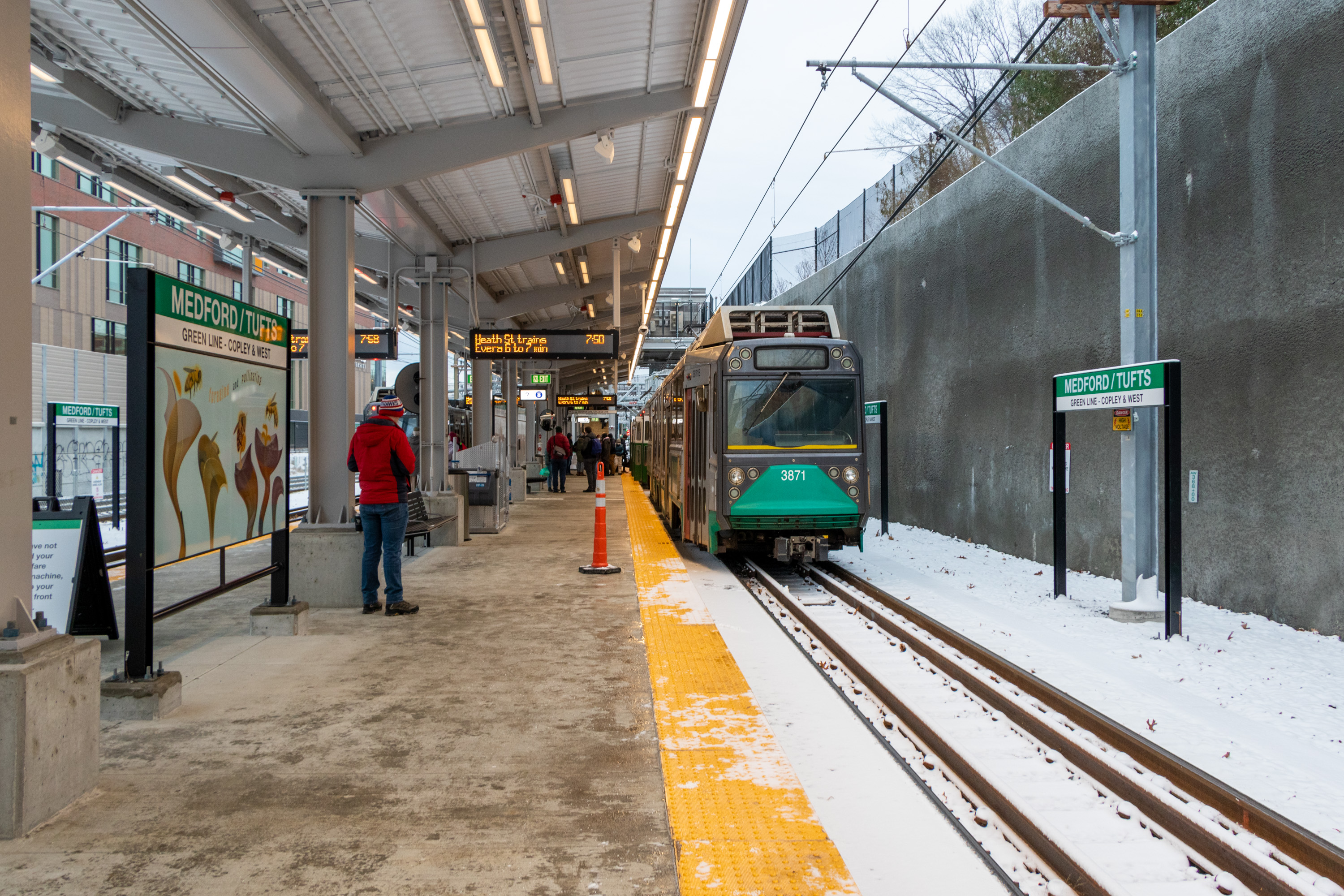
- A train at Medford/Tufts station in December 2022

General information
- Location: Boston Avenue at College Avenue; Medford, Massachusetts
- Coordinates: 42.40816°N 71.11721°W
- Lines: Medford Branch; New Hampshire Main Line
- Platforms: 1 island platform (Green Line)
- Tracks: 2 (Lowell Line); 2 (Green Line)
- Connections: MBTA bus: 80, 94, 96

Construction
- Cycle facilities: "Pedal and Park" bicycle cage
- Accessible: yes

History
- Opened: September 15, 1977 (Lowell Line); December 12, 2022 (Green Line)
- Closed: October 1979 (Lowell Line)

Passengers
- 2030 (projected): 2,420 daily boardings

Services
Preceding station	MBTA	Following station
Terminus	Green Line E branch	Ball Square toward Heath Street
Proposed services
Preceding station	MBTA	Following station
Mystic Valley Parkway Terminus	Green Line E branch	Ball Square toward Heath Street
Former services
Preceding station	MBTA	Following station
West Medford toward Lowell or Woburn	Lowell Line 1977–1979	North Station Terminus
Preceding station	Boston and Maine Railroad	Following station
Medford Hillside toward Concord, NH	Boston – Concord, NH Until 1958	North Somerville toward Boston
Location

Medford/Tufts station is a light rail station on the Massachusetts Bay Transportation Authority (MBTA) Green Line located off Boston Avenue near College Avenue in Medford, Massachusetts, adjacent to Tufts University. The accessible station has a single island platform serving the two tracks of the Medford Branch. It opened on December 12, 2022, as part of the Green Line Extension (GLX), which added two northern branches to the Green Line, and is the northern terminus of the E branch.

The location was previously served by railroad stations. The Boston and Lowell Railroad (B&L) opened Stearns Steps station near what is now College Avenue by 1849. It was soon named Tufts College, then College Hill, after the 1852-founded college. The original station building – a converted house – was replaced with the brick Tufts College station slightly to the south in 1897. The station was served by the Boston and Maine Railroad, successor to the B&L, until 1958. Tufts University station served the Lowell Line from 1977 to 1979 at the same location.

Extensions to the Green Line were proposed throughout the 20th century, most with Tufts University as one of the intermediate stations. A station site between College Avenue and Winthrop Street was chosen for the GLX in 2008. However, the planned station was moved to College Avenue in 2009. Cost increases triggered a wholesale reevaluation of the GLX project in 2015, and a scaled-down station design was released in 2016. A design-build contract was issued in 2017. In January 2020, the station was renamed Medford/Tufts under an agreement between the MBTA and the university. Construction of the station began in mid-2020 and was largely completed by early 2022.

== Station design ==
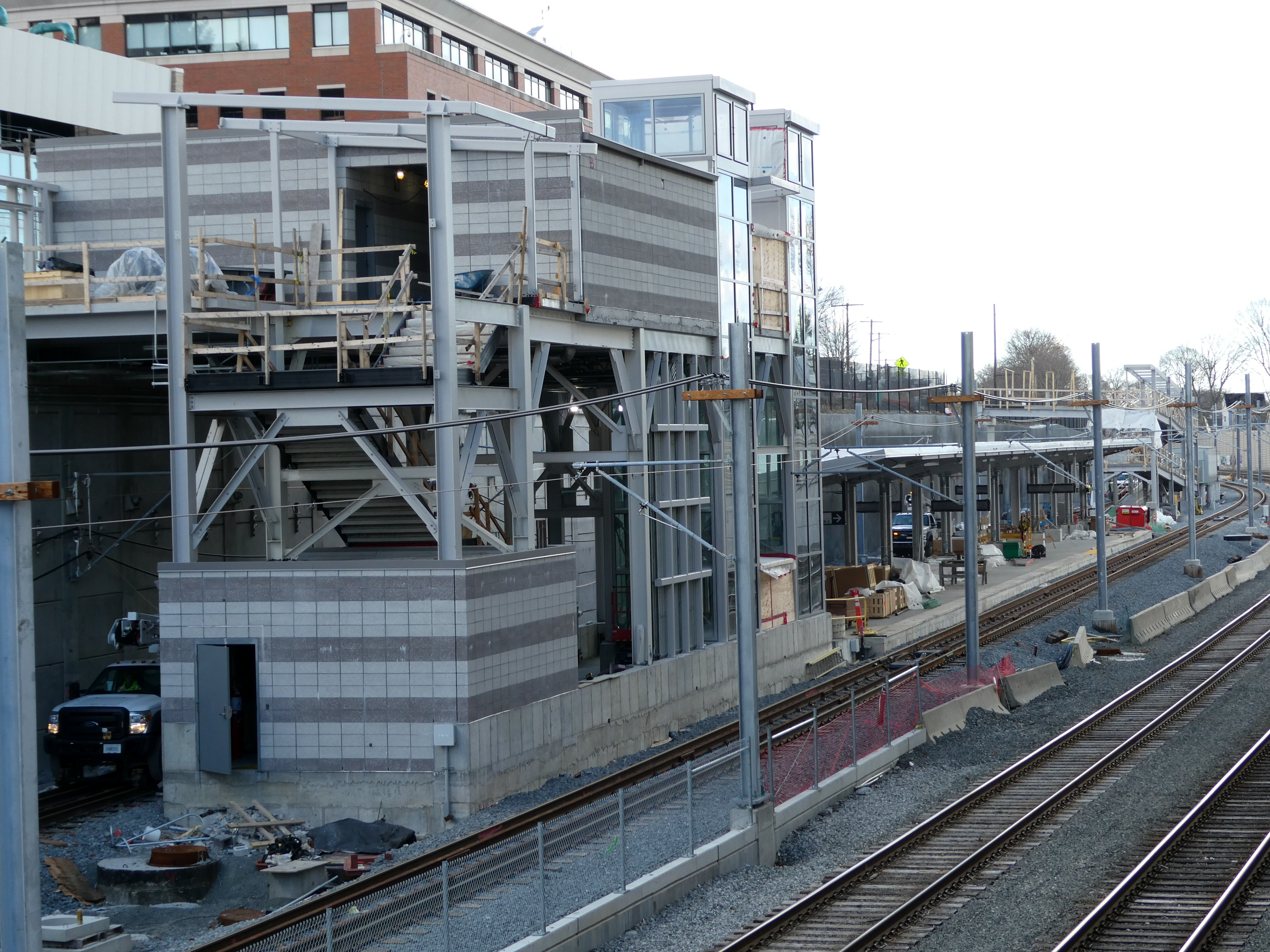
The headhouse under construction in 2022

Medford/Tufts station is located off Boston Avenue near College Avenue on the northeast side of Walnut Hill in Medford. The Lowell Line runs roughly northwest–southeast through the station area, with the two-track Medford Branch of the Green Line on the south side of the Lowell Line tracks. The station has a single island platform, 225 feet (69 m) long and 22.5 feet (6.9 m) wide, between the Green Line tracks northwest of College Avenue. A canopy covers the full length of the platform.

The platform is 8 inches (200 mm) high for accessible boarding on current light rail vehicles (LRVs), and can be raised to 14 inches (360 mm) for future level boarding with Type 9 and Type 10 LRVs; it is also provisioned for future extension to 300-foot (91 m) length. The tracks and platform are below grade in a cut. The main entrance is from Boston Avenue on the south side of the tracks, with part of the headhouse structure extending over the southern Green Line track. Stairs plus two elevators for accessibility connect the entrance to the southeast end of the platform.

A starter booth is located at the northwest end of the platform, with an emergency exit ramp to Boston Avenue. A 50-space "Pedal and Park" bike cage is located next to the entrance along Boston Avenue. Public art at the station includes Speeding Green Line – a blurred mural over the station entrance – as well as murals on panels on station signs. MBTA bus routes 80, 94, and 96 stop on Boston Avenue near the station.

== History ==
=== Railroad stations ===
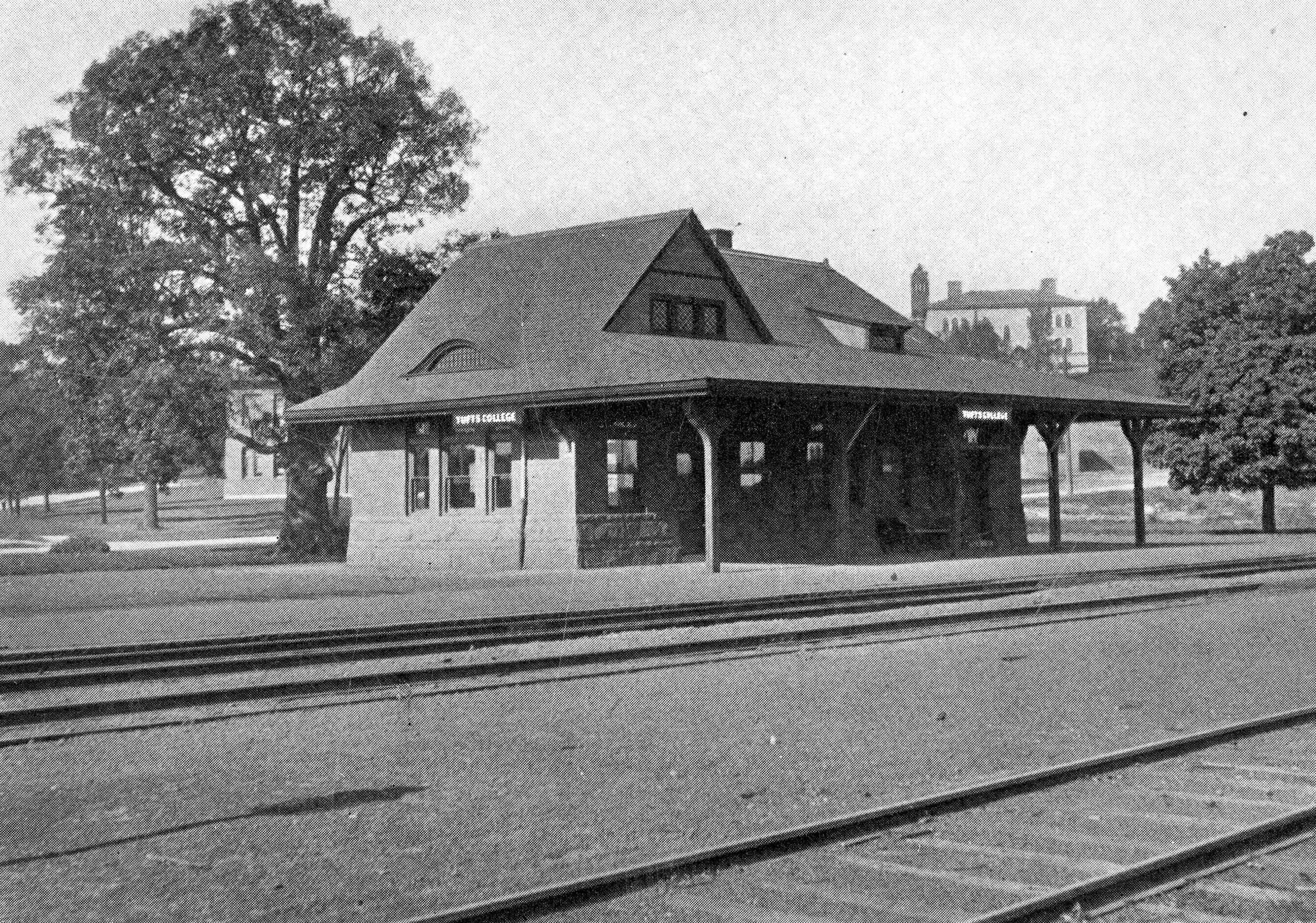
Tufts College station in 1907

The Boston and Lowell Railroad (B&L) opened through Medford in 1835, though local stops were not added immediately. Stearns Steps station, named for the nearby estate of George Luther Stearns, was located near what is now College Avenue by 1846. Tufts College was founded in 1852; by 1855, the station was called Tufts College. It was located on the west side of the tracks. The stop did not appear in some timetables during its first decade, and may have had intermittent service during that time. By September 1858, it was called College Hill and served as a flag stop for six daily round trips – largely local trains serving the Woburn Branch.

By the 1860s, special service was run to the station for commencement ceremonies. The first station building was an addition to a residential structure on the north side of the tracks just west of College Avenue. The college's post office was located in the station, with the station agent serving as the postmaster, until a separate post office was built nearby in 1885. In 1887, the B&L was leased by the Boston and Maine Railroad (B&M) as its Southern Division.

On May 3, 1897, the older station building was replaced with a brick structure, located on the opposite side of the tracks and slightly to the south at Pearson Street. At that time, it was renamed as Tufts College, matching the post office name, at the request of students. The bridge carrying College Avenue over the tracks was replaced in 1898. The former station was twice burnt by students during riots after football games in November 1905.

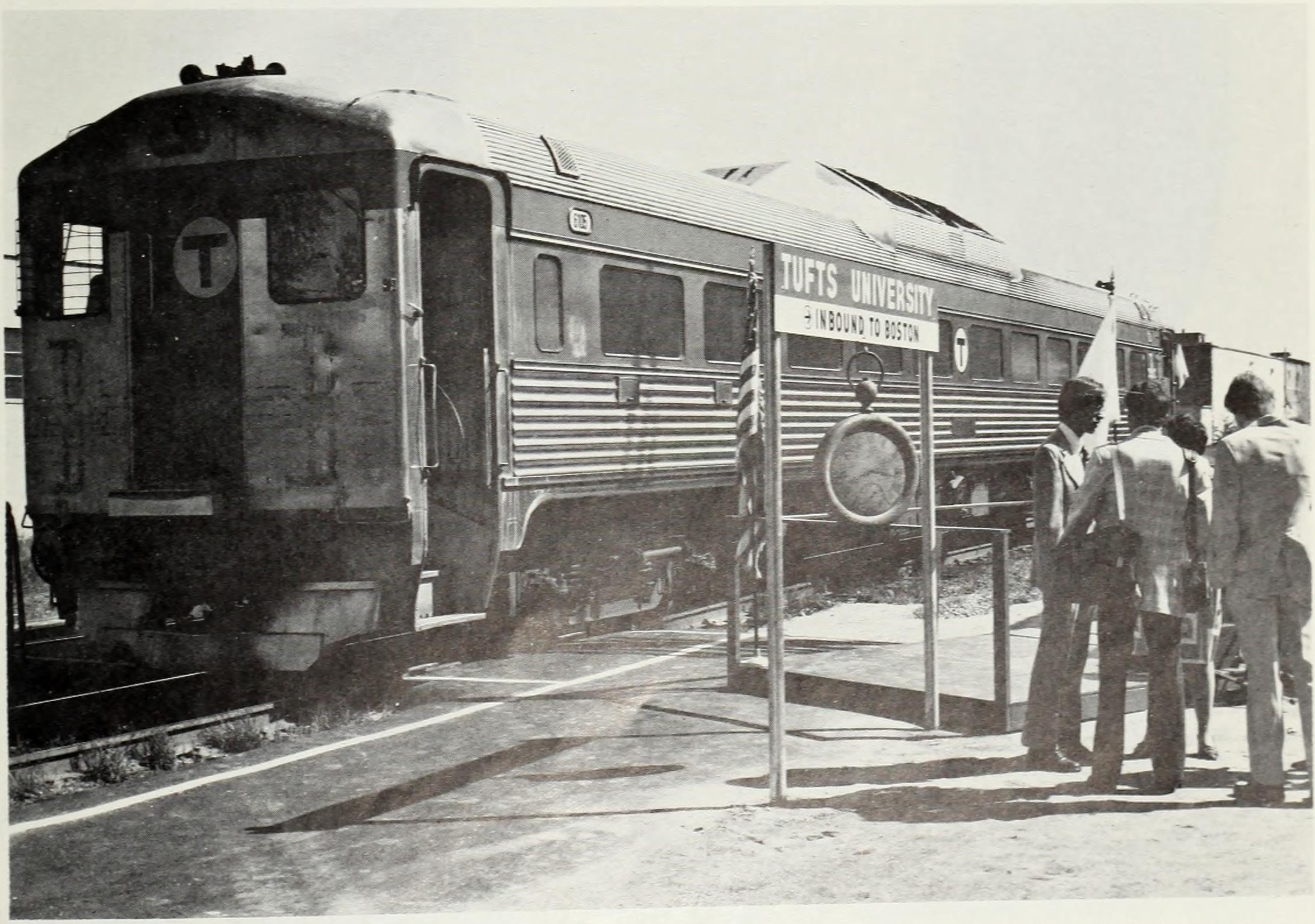
Tufts University station in September 1977

Tufts College station was commonly used by students; special trains operated direct from the station for some away football games. However, streetcars consolidated under the Boston Elevated Railway cut sharply into local railroad traffic. The college purchased the disused station building for one dollar in 1941 to avoid its demolition by the railroad, and repurposed it as a theatre workshop in 1944. A small wooden shelter was built for passengers. On April 18, 1958, the Public Utilities Commission approved a vast set of cuts to B&M commuter service, including the closure of North Somerville, Tufts College, and Medford Hillside stations. The three stations were closed on May 18, 1958, amid the first of a series of cuts.

During the late 1960s and early 1970s, the B&M reopened several inner-suburb commuter rail stations in response to community desire for service that was faster if less frequent than buses. Tufts University station near the Tufts College station site was scheduled to open on October 12, 1976. The opening was delayed by a disagreement between the B&M and the university over liability insurance. As the Massachusetts Bay Transportation Authority (MBTA) took over the system, the new agency agreed to take on the liability. The university paid $2,000 (equivalent to $8,600 in 2024) of the $4,600 (equivalent to $20,000 in 2024) cost of the small platform, with the rest paid by the MBTA. Service began on September 1, 1977, with an opening ceremony held on September 15. The station was abandoned in October 1979 due to poor ridership.

=== Green Line Extension ===
==== Previous plans ====
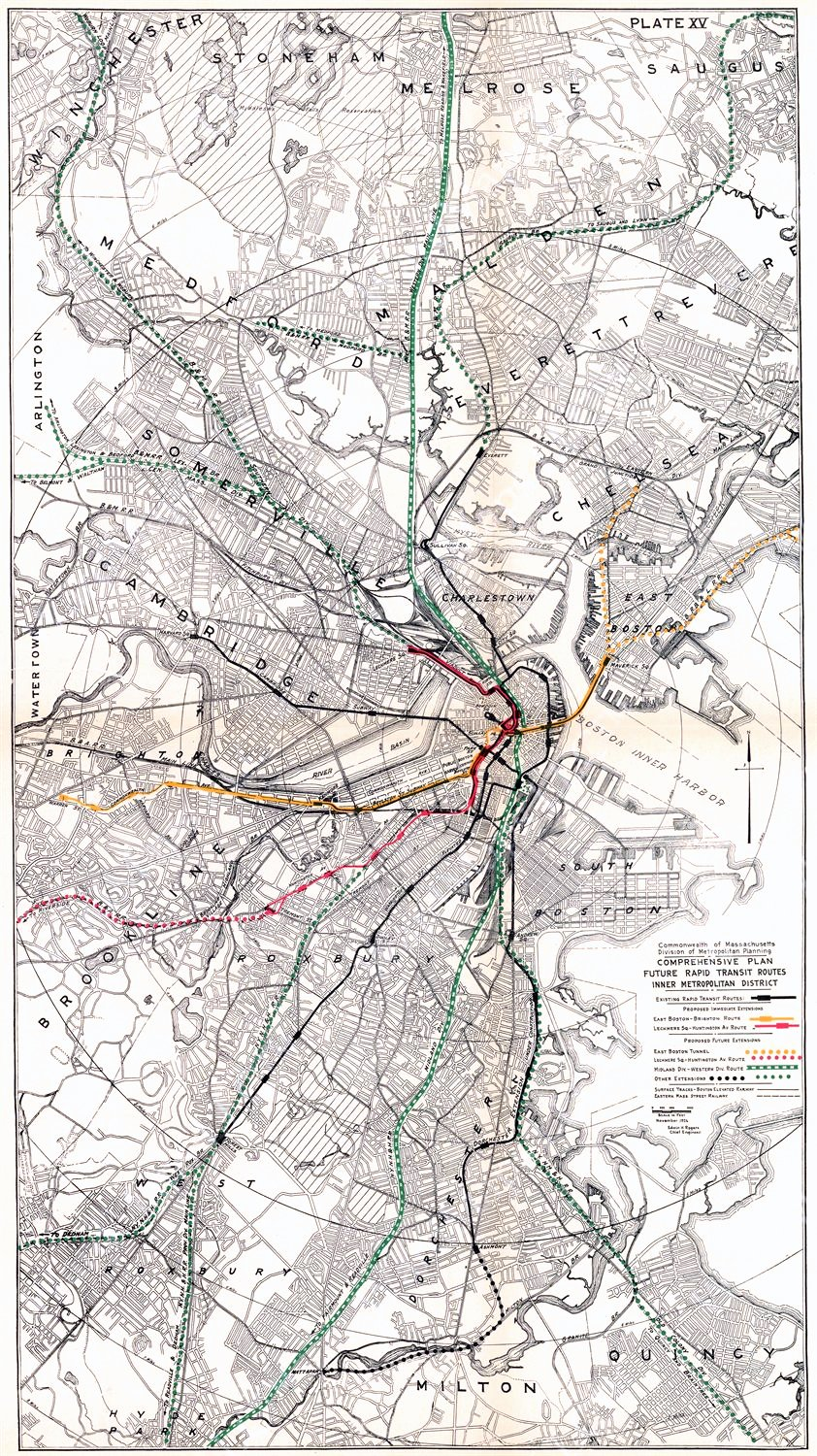
Map showing the 1926-proposed extensions northwest from Lechmere (at left)

The Boston Elevated Railway (BERy) opened Lechmere station in 1922 as a terminal for streetcar service in the Tremont Street subway. That year, with the downtown subway network and several radial lines in service, the BERy indicated plans to build three additional radial subways: one paralleling the Midland Branch through Dorchester, a second branching from the Boylston Street subway to run under Huntington Avenue, and a third extending from Lechmere Square northwest through Somerville.

The Report on Improved Transportation Facilities, published by the Boston Division of Metropolitan Planning in 1926, proposed extension from Lechmere to North Cambridge via the Southern Division and the 1870-built Fitchburg Cutoff. Consideration was also given to extension past North Cambridge over the Lexington Branch, and to a branch following the Southern Division from Somerville Junction to Woburn.

In 1945, a preliminary report from the state Coolidge Commission recommended nine suburban rapid transit extensions – most similar to the 1926 plan – along existing railroad lines. These included an extension from Lechmere to Woburn over the Southern Division, rather than using the Fitchburg Cutoff. Tufts College was to be among the intermediate stations. The 1962 North Terminal Area Study recommended that the elevated Lechmere–North Station segment be abandoned. The Main Line (now the Orange Line) was to be relocated along the B&M Western Route; it would have a branch following the Southern Division to Arlington or Woburn.

The Massachusetts Bay Transportation Authority (MBTA) was formed in 1964 as an expansion of the Metropolitan Transit Authority to subsidize suburban commuter rail service, as well as to construct rapid transit extensions to replace some commuter rail lines. In 1965, as part of systemwide rebranding, the Tremont Street subway and its connecting lines became the Green Line. The 1966 Program for Mass Transportation, the MBTA's first long-range plan, listed a short extension from Lechmere to Washington Street as an immediate priority, with a second phase reaching to Mystic Valley Parkway (Route 16) or West Medford.

The 1972 final report of the Boston Transportation Planning Review listed a Green Line extension from Lechmere to Ball Square as a lower priority, as did several subsequent planning documents. In 1980, the MBTA began a study of the "Green Line Northwest Corridor" (from Haymarket to Medford), with extension past Lechmere one of its three topic areas. Extensions to Tufts University or Union Square were considered.

==== Station planning ====
In 1991, the state agreed to build a set of transit projects as part of an agreement with the Conservation Law Foundation (CLF), which had threatened a lawsuit over auto emissions from the Central Artery/Tunnel Project (Big Dig). Among these projects was a "Green Line Extension To Ball Square/Tufts University", to be complete by the end of 2011. No progress was made until an updated agreement was signed in 2005. The Beyond Lechmere Northwest Corridor Study, a Major Investment Study/alternatives analysis, was published in 2005. The analysis studied a variety of light rail, bus rapid transit, and commuter rail extensions, most of which included a Ball Square station near the former North Somerville station site. The highest-rated alternatives all included an extension to West Medford with College Avenue as one of the intermediate stations.

The Massachusetts Executive Office of Transportation and Public Works submitted an Expanded Environmental Notification Form (EENF) to the Massachusetts Executive Office of Environmental Affairs in October 2006. The EENF identified a Green Line extension with Medford and Union Square branches as the preferred alternative. That December, the Secretary of Environmental Affairs issued a certificate that required analysis of the terminal location in the draft environmental impact report (DEIR) for the Green Line Extension (GLX). The EENF had proposed College Avenue, with a possible extension to a second station at Winthrop Street; the certificate also required analysis of a single station between the two streets, and of a further extension to Route 16. The certificate also required consideration of Lowell Line stations at Tufts University and Gilman Square to provide a connection between commuter rail and rapid transit. Planned station sites were announced in May 2008. A single station between College Avenue and Winthrop Street was recommended due to lower cost, better station spacing, and the ability to avoid modifying the College Avenue and Winthrop Street bridges.

The DEIR, released in October 2009, did not recommend the construction of a commuter rail platform at Gilman Square or Tufts University. The width of a platform and a gauntlet track for freight would require additional right-of-way width, which would have substantial impacts on adjacent properties. It also recommended a single station at College Avenue, as the previously planned combined station would have had poor pedestrian access from neighborhoods north of the tracks. A separate Winthrop Street station was not recommended, as its catchment area overlapped with the College Avenue and Route 16 stations. However, Route 16 was deferred to a future phase, making College Avenue the terminus. Preliminary plans in the DEIR called for the station to have a single island platform northwest of College Avenue. A two-level headhouse with stairs, an escalator, and two elevators would have entrances from a plaza at the intersection of Boston Avenue and College Avenue.

The 2010 final environmental impact report added several mitigations for traffic, noise, and vibration associated with College Avenue being the terminal station. Updated plans shown in June 2011 added a pedestrian path to Burget Avenue. Plans presented in February 2012 enlarged the entrance plaza, added an emergency exit ramp at the northwest end of the station, and relocated the bike cage. By 2012, the portion of the Medford Branch from Gilman Square station to College Avenue was expected to be completed by June 2019. A Tufts University commuter rail station to supplement the Green Line station was again listed as a possibility in 2012 as an interim air quality mitigation measure in response to delays in building the Green Line Extension. However, such a station would have been costly to build and could not have been completed by the 2015 deadline, and was thus not supported by MassDOT.

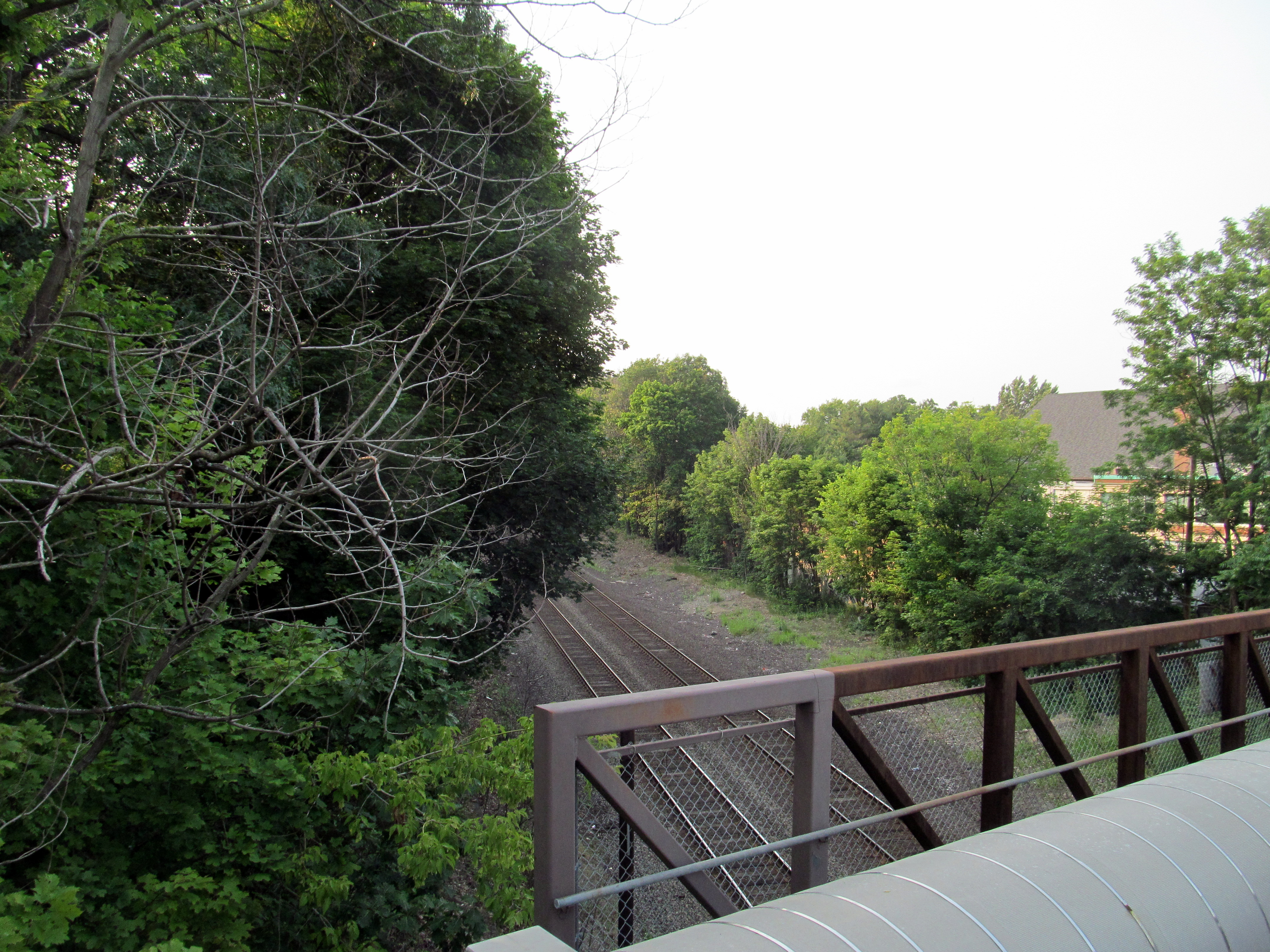
The planned station site in July 2015

A further update in June 2013 removed the electric penthouse and reconfigured the headhouse and emergency exit ramp. Design was then paused while Phase 2/2A stations (Lechmere, Union Square, and East Somerville) were prioritized, as they were scheduled to open sooner than the rest of the GLX. Design resumed in fall 2014; by May 2015, elements of College Avenue station ranged between 30% and 90% design. In June 2015, Tufts announced plans to build a new university building on College Avenue. One-third of the structure was to be over the Green Line station, with a footbridge over Boston Avenue to the main campus area.

==== Redesign ====
In August 2015, the MBTA disclosed that project costs had increased substantially, triggered a wholesale re-evaluation of the GLX project. In December 2015, the MBTA ended its contracts with four firms. Construction work in progress continued, but no new contracts were awarded. At that time, cancellation of the project was considered possible, as were elimination of the Union Square Branch and other cost reduction measures. In May 2016, the MassDOT and MBTA boards approved a modified project that had undergone value engineering to reduce its cost. Stations were simplified to resemble D branch surface stations rather than full rapid transit stations, with canopies, faregates, escalators, and some elevators removed. The escalator was removed from the College Avenue station design; the emergency exit ramp was replaced with an at-grade track crossing.

In December 2016, the MBTA announced a new planned opening date of 2021 for the extension. A design-build contract for the GLX was awarded in November 2017. The winning proposal included six additive options – elements removed during value engineering – including full-length canopies at all stations. The emergency exit ramp was re-added to the station design, and a pedestrian bridge was added adjacent to the College Avenue road bridge to avoid a larger reconstruction of the bridge. Station design advanced from 5% in March 2018 to 75% that December and to 95% in October 2019.

==== Construction ====
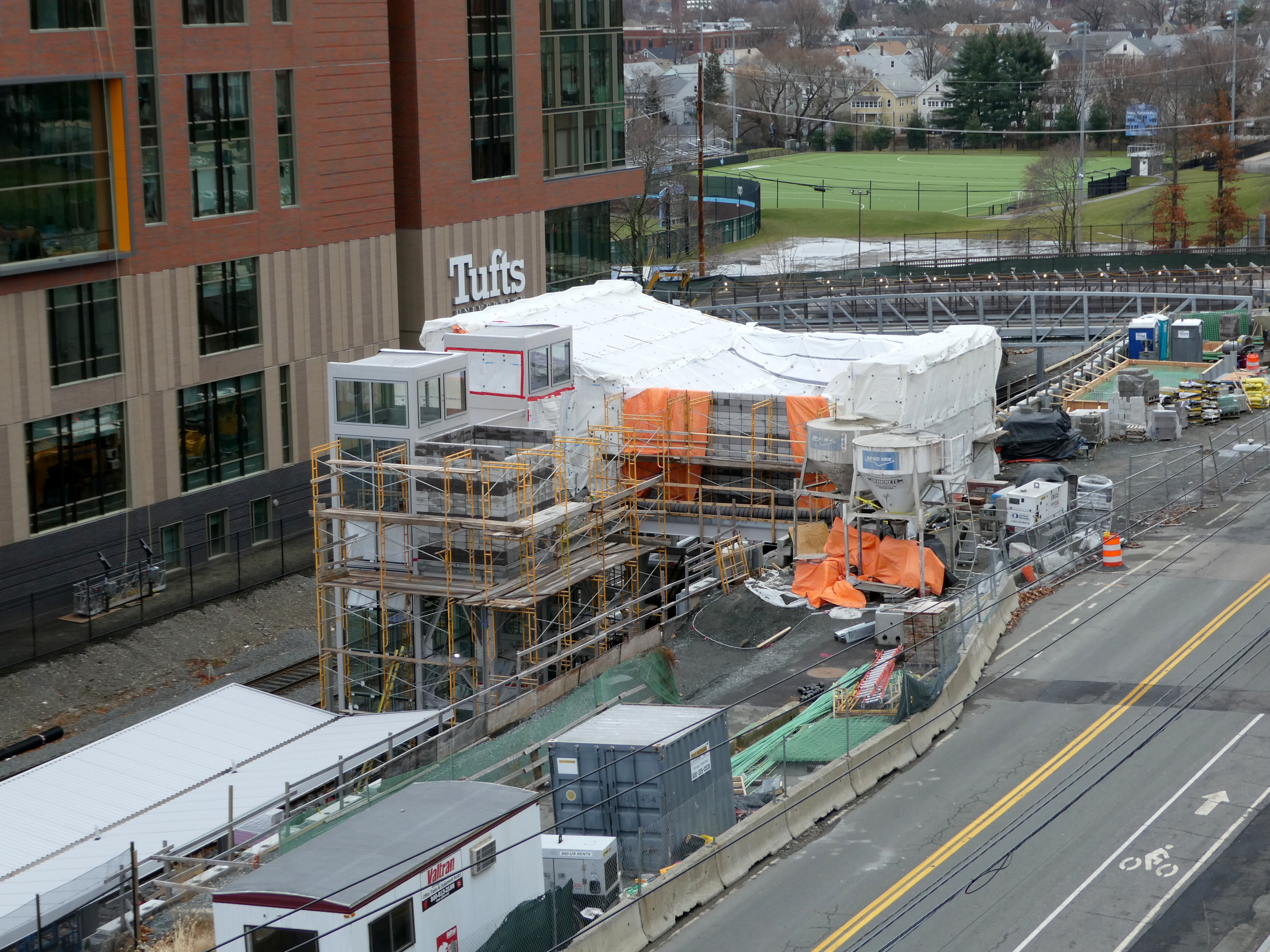
Station construction in December 2021

By the time construction on the new Tufts building – the Joyce Cummings Center – began in 2019, the footbridge and the portion over the station had been eliminated from the design. On January 2, 2020, the MBTA and Tufts announced that the station would be named Medford/Tufts. Tufts would pay $2 million in maintenance costs over 10 years in exchange for the name.

Construction on the station began by August 2020, with retaining wall work preceding it. The 100-foot (30 m)-long, 13.5-short-ton (12,200 kg) pedestrian bridge was put in place on May 8, 2021. Both elevator shafts were erected later that month. The concrete platform was poured in June 2021 – months later than the other GLX stations – with the emergency exit ramp under construction by that time. The headhouse and the platform canopy were constructed in the second half of 2021.

Original plans called for the D branch to be extended to Medford/Tufts. However, in April 2021, the MBTA indicated that the Medford Branch would instead be served by the E branch. A pedestrian bridge parallel to College Avenue was installed on May 8, 2021. By March 2021, the station was expected to open in December 2021. In June 2021, the MBTA indicated an additional delay, under which the station was expected to open in May 2022. In February 2022, the MBTA announced that the Medford Branch would open in "late summer". Train testing on the Medford Branch began in May 2022. In August 2022, the planned opening was delayed to November 2022. The Medford Branch, including Medford/Tufts station, opened on December 12, 2022.
