= Conservation Law Foundation =

U.S. non-profit organisation

- Abbreviation: CLF
- Formation: 1966
- Purpose: Renewable energy Climate Change; Air Pollution; Water Pollution; Environmental Justice; Oceans
- Location(s): Boston, MA; Portland, ME; Concord, NH; Providence, RI; Montpelier, VT; New Haven, CT
- Region served: New England
- President: Bradley M. Campbell
- Budget: FY2020: $15.7m in grants, donations, & earned income
- Website: www.clf.org

Conservation Law Foundation (CLF) is an environmental advocacy organization based in New England, United States. Since 1966, CLF's mission has been to advocate for New England's environment and its communities. CLF's advocacy work takes place across five integrated program areas: Clean Energy & Climate Change, Clean Air & Water, Healthy Oceans, People & Justice, and Healthy Communities. CLF's mission statement is to "use the law, science, and the market to create solutions that preserve natural resources, build healthy communities, and sustain a vibrant economy." CLF focuses on promoting renewable energy and fighting air and water pollution; building sustainable fishing communities and protecting marine habitats; promoting public transit and defending public health; achieving environmental justice; and sustaining a vibrant, equitable economy.

Conservation Law Foundation is a nonprofit, member-supported organization headquartered in Boston, with offices in Connecticut, Maine, Massachusetts, New Hampshire, Rhode Island and Vermont.

== Structure and goals ==
With offices in every New England state, CLF works to solve environmental problems that impact the region's communities. CLF’s strategies of advocacy concentrate on areas of law, public policy, and science. CLF both defends environmental policy through litigation and petitions and creates it through legislative and regulatory advocacy.

As a result, CLF works to bring local environmental concerns to the attention of legislators and policymakers, and serve as a resource for communicating these concerns throughout the region.

== Notable achievements ==
Founded in 1966 to stop the development of ski slopes on Massachusetts' highest peak, Mount Greylock, CLF has since expanded its advocacy to address both environmental and community issues in all six New England states.

=== Traditional environmental advocacy ===
In 1977, the organization successfully fought the expansion plans for a federal divided highway through Franconia Notch in New Hampshire's White Mountains. Since that time, CLF's legal advocacy has focused on several natural resources cases, including the cleanup of Lake Champlain, the prevention of overfishing of groundfish – cod, haddock, and flounder – off the coast of New England (resulting in a settlement requiring the National Marine Fisheries Service to produce a management plan to eliminate overfishing), and the protection of the Vermont black bear habitat (by obtaining a federal court injunction halting destructive U.S. logging practices in southern Vermont's fragile Lamb Brook wilderness area, marking the first time an environmental group in the Northeast successfully challenges the U.S. Forest Service's clear-cutting policies).

=== Cleanup of Boston Harbor ===
In 1983, CLF sued the Massachusetts Metropolitan District Commission (a division of the government of the state of Massachusetts) and the Environmental Protection Agency to clean up Boston Harbor, which had severely degraded water quality. The result of this and other litigation, including that of the City of Quincy, was to compel the state to comply with federal environmental laws and to build appropriate facilities to properly treat sewage discharged into Boston Harbor, and establish workable governmental mechanisms to finance the new facilities and pay for their continuing operations. The formation of the Massachusetts Water Resources Authority (MWRA), taking over the water facilities properties, operations, and legal authority previously held by the Metropolitan District commission, is one byproduct of the litigation. The legal battle was most intense from 1983 into the 1990s.

=== Community and transportation advocacy ===
CLF advocated for increased light rail and public transportation options in Boston, New Hampshire, and Maine. In a pre-suit settlement with CLF, state highway officials in Massachusetts agreed to implement measures to reduce air pollution, including rail and transit improvements, as part of Boston’s Central Artery project (also known as the Big Dig).

Additionally, CLF advocated for state laws to protect children from the threat of lead poisoning. In 1988, following a three-year campaign by CLF, Massachusetts passed the nation’s toughest law to protect its citizens, especially children, from lead poisoning. More recently, CLF has continued its work to prevent lead poisoning in children by advocating for bills in New Hampshire and Vermont that require testing of school drinking water sources.

=== First marine national monument in the Atlantic Ocean ===
CLF and its partners played a critical role in the designation of the first marine national monument in the Atlantic Ocean. President Barack Obama designated the Northeast Canyons and Seamounts Marine National Monument in September of 2016. The monument, located on Georges Bank, includes four underwater mountains and three deep-sea canyons. It protects ancient and fragile coral communities, endangered whales, and an abundance of unique and rare marine life, some found nowhere else in the world.

=== Climate change and energy advocacy ===
One of the focuses of CLF's recent advocacy is pushing states to invest in renewable energy sources to mitigate climate change. In 1983, CLF took credit for the decision by the Public Service Company of New Hampshire, the largest electric company in the state, to abandon its plans for a second nuclear unit at Seabrook Nuclear Power Station after CLF testimony demonstrated that the construction of the facility would not make financial sense.

Later, in 2003, CLF claimed victory when the Massachusetts Department of Environmental Protection finalized a schedule requiring the Salem Harbor and Brayton Point coal-fired power plants to significantly reduce harmful emissions and comply with the "Filthy Five" regulations. Both plants have since shut down their operations.

More recently, CLF played a critical role in several states passing strong climate laws, known as Global Warming Solutions Acts. CLF also intervened to help the town of Burrillville, Rhode Island, prevent the construction of a large natural gas/oil-fired power plant – which would have polluted the area and contributed to climate change – from being built in the community.

== Recent and current projects ==
=== Boston Harbor public access and resilience ===
While the clean-up of Boston Harbor has been a success, today, it faces new threats, including sea-level rise and efforts by some private developers to block public access to what is affectionately called the People’s Harbor. CLF is working to protect the public’s legal right to access the harbor and ensuring that the area is made resilient in the face of increasingly severe climate impacts.

=== Climate accountability ===
Exposés by InsideClimate News and the Los Angeles Times have confirmed that oil giant ExxonMobil knew as early as the late 1970s that climate change caused by human activities would be devastating if left unchecked. CLF investigated how this has affected New England communities. Its investigation revealed that, despite knowing the harm climate change could cause, ExxonMobil left its oil storage facilities in Everett, Massachusetts, and elsewhere vulnerable to flooding from storms and rising seas.

CLF launched the United States’ first legal action against Exxon for its climate deceit and for Clean Water Act violations at its oil storage facility in Everett, which sits on the Mystic River. In 2023, CLF settled with Exxon. The terms of the settlement included a restriction to prevent the property from ever again being utilized as bulk fossil fuel storage. CLF has also pursuing similar cases against Shell Oil, Gulf Oil, and others in additional cities in New England.

=== State-level climate mandates ===
CLF has worked with partners in every New England state to pass binding laws that require significant cuts in climate-damaging emissions by 2050. Climate scientists agree that, globally, nations must lower greenhouse gas emissions within 10 years to avoid catastrophic climate change. With federal climate action stymied, CLF and its partners have successfully pushed state governments in Massachusetts, Maine, Vermont, Rhode Island, and Connecticut to pass binding climate laws – or to update existing laws – to ensure accountability in meeting emissions targets, with the goal of achieving net zero emissions in New England by 2050.

=== Zero Waste Project ===
According to CLF, landfills and waste incinerators are dangerous and unsustainable. Their harmful impacts are felt most acutely by Environmental Justice (EJ) communities, which host a disproportionate number of these facilities compared to wealthier communities. Through the Zero Waste Project, CLF is raising awareness about the negative health and environmental impacts of trash and pushing forward solutions to reduce waste. Among other successes, CLF and partners successfully pushed Maine’s legislature to pass the first "Extended Producer Responsibility" bill in the country in 2021.
