= Green Line Extension =

Light rail system in greater Boston, US

Green Line Extension (GLX)
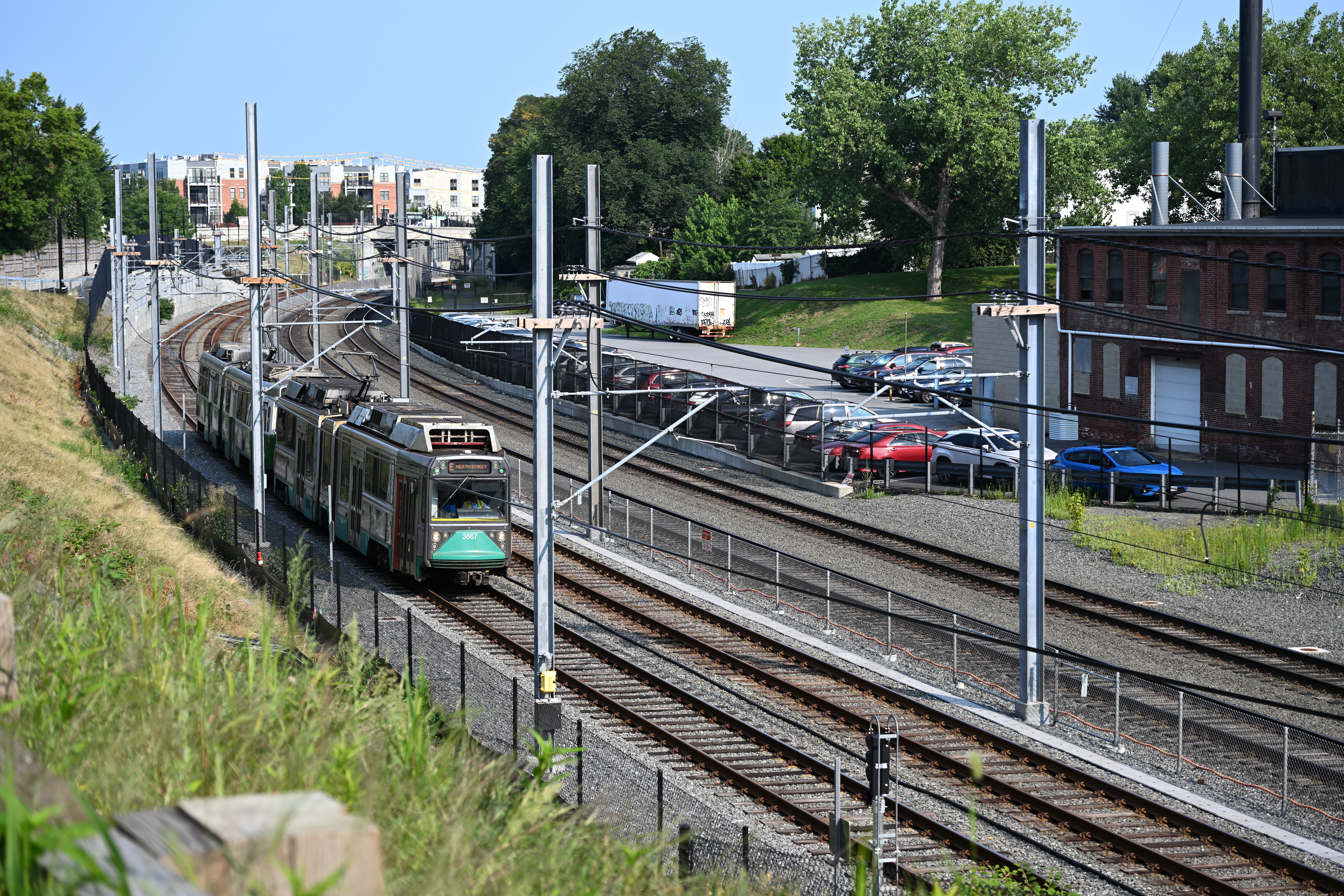
- A train on the Medford Branch in 2024

Overview
- Owner: Massachusetts Bay Transportation Authority
- Locale: Cambridge, Somerville, and Medford, Massachusetts
- Termini: Union Square (D); Medford/Tufts (E)
- Stations: 7 open, 1 proposed

Service
- Type: Light rail
- System: Green Line (MBTA subway)

History
- Opened: March 21, 2022 (Union Square Branch); December 12, 2022 (Medford Branch)

Technical
- Line length: 4.3 miles (6.9 km)
- Number of tracks: 2
- Track gauge: 4 ft 8 1/2 in (1,435 mm) standard gauge
- Electrification: Overhead line, 600 V DC
- Operating speed: 50 miles per hour (80 km/h)

The Green Line Extension (GLX) was a construction project to extend the Massachusetts Bay Transportation Authority (MBTA) Green Line light rail system northwest into Somerville and Medford, two inner suburbs of Boston, Massachusetts. The project opened in two phases in 2022 at a total cost of $2.28 billion. Total ridership on the 4.3-mile (6.9 km) extension is estimated to reach 45,000 one-way trips per day in 2030.

The project begins at the north end of the Lechmere Viaduct, where the former ground-level Lechmere station was replaced by an elevated station on an extended viaduct. Two branches split north of Lechmere, with the Union Square Branch following the MBTA Commuter Rail Fitchburg Line right of way to Union Square station in Somerville. The Medford Branch follows the Lowell Line right-of-way to Medford/Tufts station with four intermediate stations. A new vehicle maintenance facility and storage yard are located in the Inner Belt District. The project includes a 1.9-mile (3.1 km) extension of the Somerville Community Path to North Point.

An extension of service beyond Lechmere was considered as early as 1922, with the first formal proposal in 1926. Despite appearing in other regional plans throughout the 20th century, the state did not commit to the project until 1990. Planning began in 2006 with a projected completion date of 2014; this was delayed to 2015, then to 2018. A groundbreaking was held in 2012, with several early construction elements over the next two years. The federal government committed $996 million of the $2.2 billion cost in 2014.

In 2015, with projected costs increased to $3.3 billion, the project was placed on hold. A revised plan, with more modest stations and other value engineering, was submitted in 2016 and approved in 2017. The main $1.08 billion design-build contract was issued in November 2017, with several optional items like platform canopies and a larger vehicle maintenance facility included. Construction began in 2018, with the old Lechmere station closed in May 2020. The new Lechmere station and Union Square Branch opened on March 21, 2022, while the Medford Branch opened on December 12, 2022. The Community Path extension opened in June 2023.

== Route and design ==
Map of the Green Line Extension

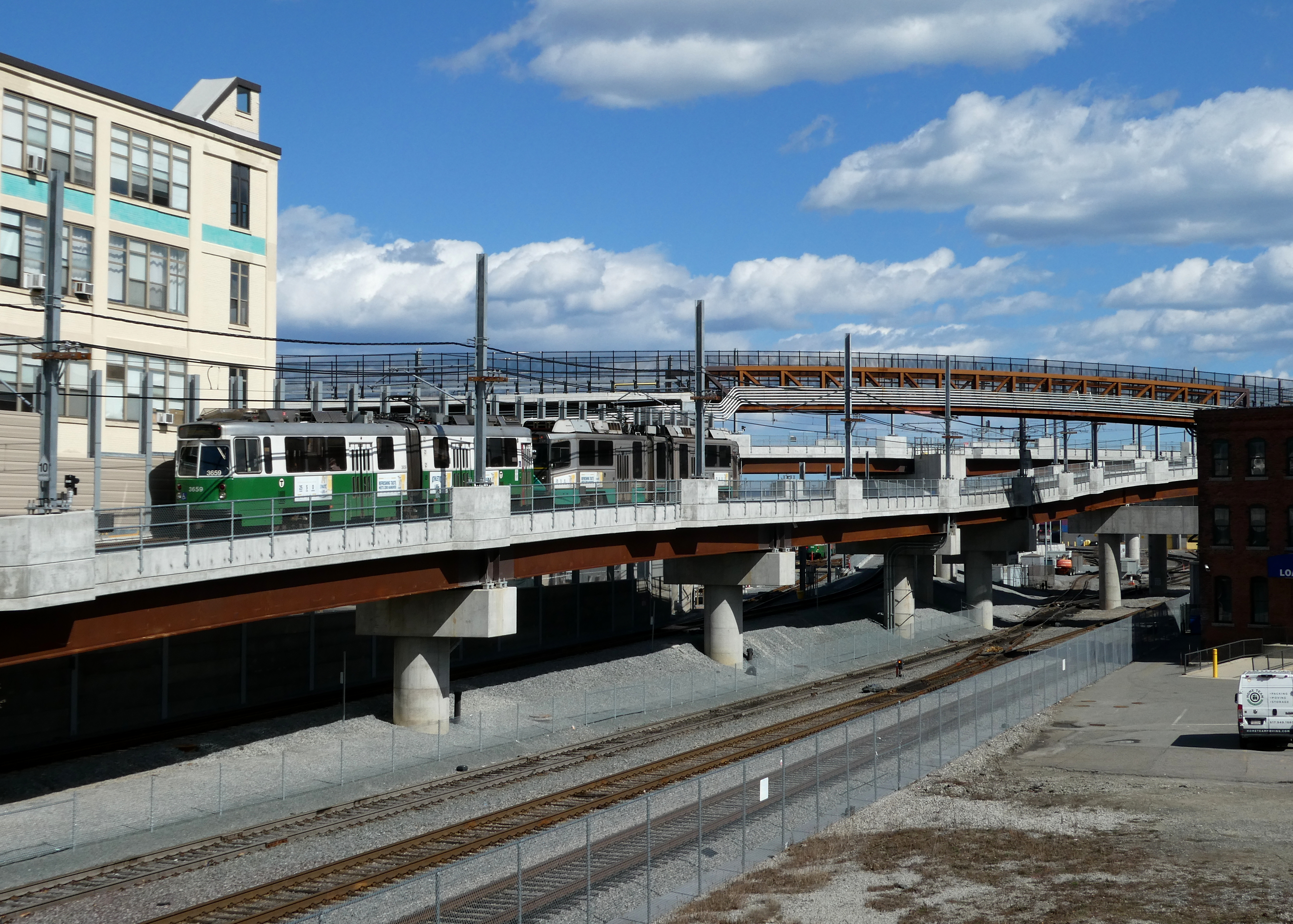
The Red Bridge viaduct, which connects the two branches with the viaduct to Lechmere and to the maintenance facility

The GLX is primarily located in Somerville, northwest of downtown Boston, with its northernmost portion in Medford and its southernmost portion in the East Cambridge section of Cambridge. The GLX begins at the north end of the Lechmere Viaduct in East Cambridge, where a short elevated section formerly led to the surface-level Lechmere station at Lechmere Square. The new elevated GLX viaduct continues northwest for about 0.6 miles (1.0 km), paralleling the O'Brien Highway. A new elevated Lechmere station is located on the viaduct on the east side of Lechmere Square. Two branches split at an aerial flying junction on the Red Bridge viaduct in the Inner Belt area.

The Medford Branch continues 3.0 miles (4.8 km) northwest to Medford/Tufts, with intermediate stations at East Somerville, Gilman Square, Magoun Square, and Ball Square. It runs in a below-grade cut along with the two-track Lowell Line and is operated as part of the E branch. An extension of the Somerville Community Path runs along the west side of the Medford Branch south of Lowell Street, with a high bridge carrying it above the Red Bridge viaduct to a new terminus in the Northpoint development. An additional 0.9-mile (1.4 km) extension from Medford/Tufts to Mystic Valley Parkway is proposed, but it is not being constructed as part of the main GLX.

The Union Square Branch continues 0.7 miles (1.1 km) west to Union Square, with no intermediate stations. It runs at grade next to the two-track Fitchburg Line and is operated as part of the D branch. The vehicle maintenance facility (VMF) is located in the Inner Belt area adjacent to the MBTA Commuter Rail Maintenance Facility. It includes a four-track shop building, ten storage tracks with capacity for about 43 light rail vehicles (LRVs), a loop track, and a building for operator reporting and breaks. Yard leads connect the VMF to both branches near the Red Bridge flyover.

The GLX is fully grade separated, with no road grade crossings, though there are level crossings for passengers at East Somerville and Ball Square stations. Construction of the project included the replacement or modification of three rail bridges and seven road bridges. Maximum speed on the extension is 50 miles per hour (80 km/h), except for 10–20 miles per hour (16–32 km/h) limits for the Union Square Branch at Red Bridge. As with the existing Green Line subway and D branch, the GLX has automatic block signaling with color light signals. The signal system is designed for 5-minute headways on each branch, with 2 1/2-minute headways through Lechmere.

=== Stations ===
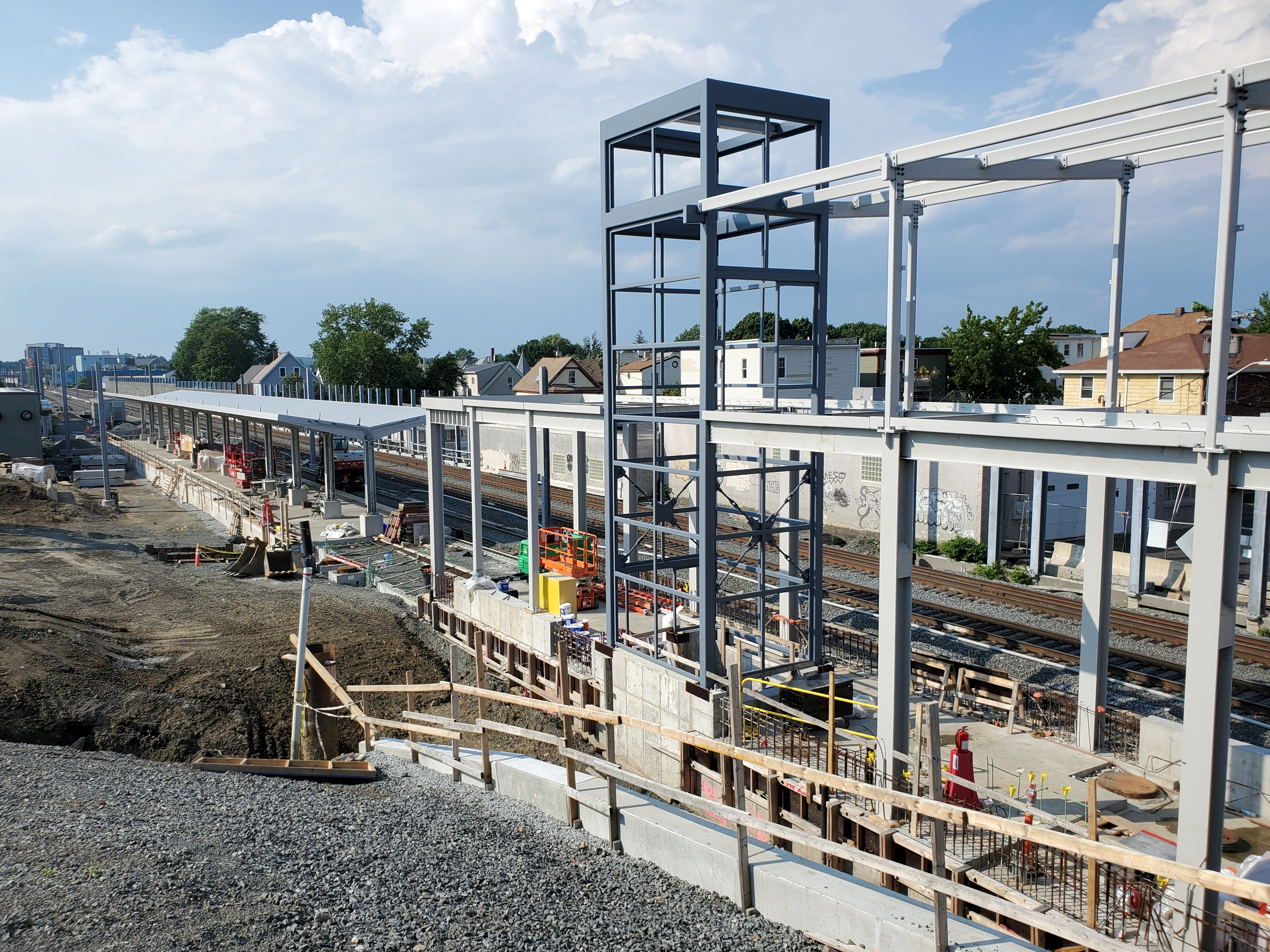
Ball Square station under construction in July 2021

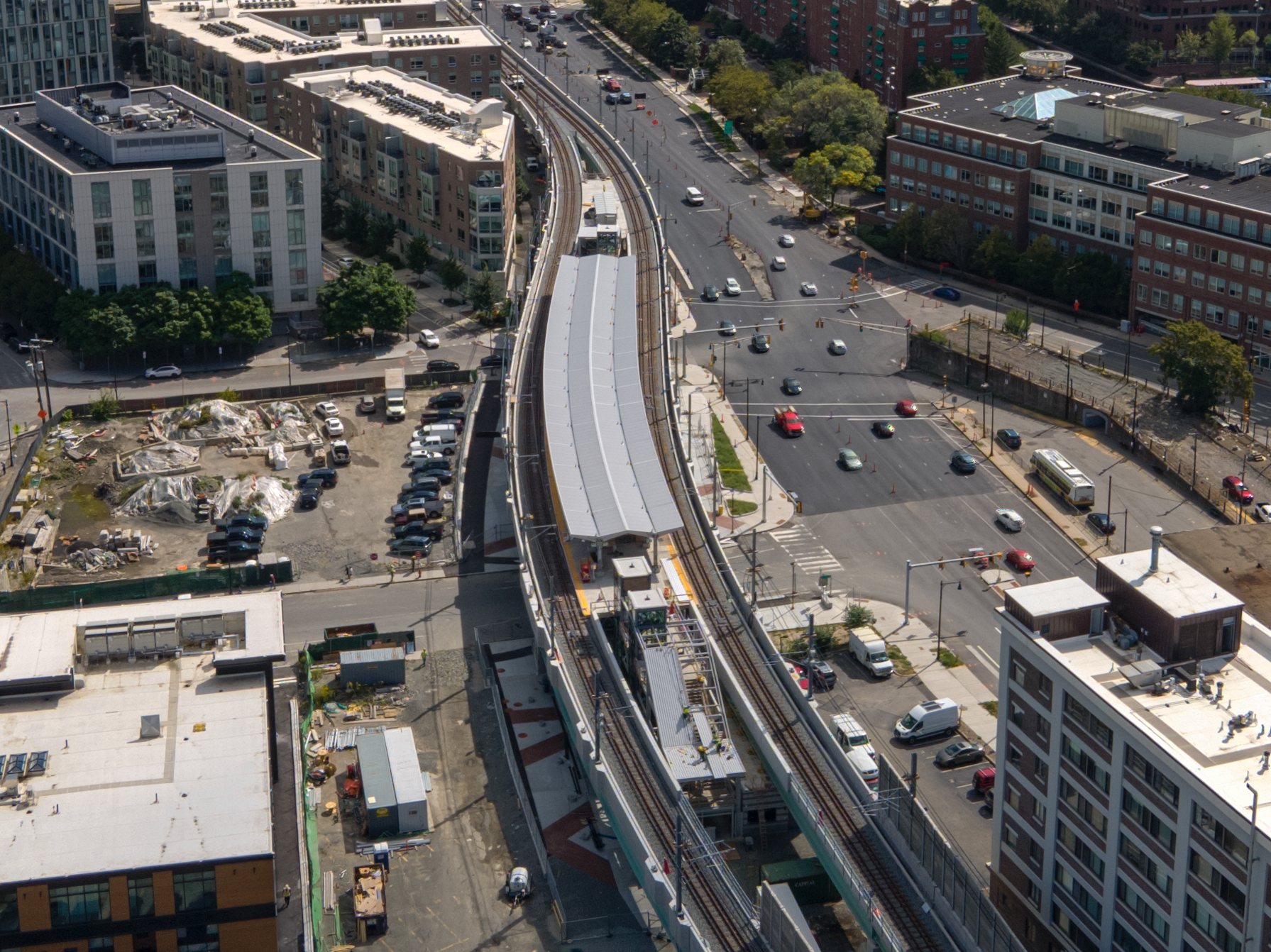
Lechmere station under construction in September 2021

The seven GLX stations are accessible; all have elevators between street level and platform level except East Somerville, which has a ramp from street level. The stations have fare vending machines, but not faregates. Most of the stations have island platforms 20–22.5 feet (6.1–6.9 m) wide and 225 feet (69 m) long – enough to fit three current LRVs or two future Type 10 LRVs – with provision to extend them to 300 feet (91 m) in the future. The platform at Lechmere is 32–35 feet (9.8–10.7 m) wide and 355 feet (108 m) long – enough to fit two current two-car trains – as it would be difficult to later extend the elevated platform. The platforms are 8 inches (200 mm) high for accessible boarding on current LRVs, and can be raised to 14 inches (360 mm) for future level boarding with Type 9 and Type 10 LRVs.

Stations have validators on the fare vending machines, with proof of payment enforcement in effect. When the station designs were simplified in 2016–17, faregates were removed from the plans. The MBTA expected AFC 2.0 (the Charliecard replacement system) to be fully in place by the time the GLX opened, with passengers able to board and tap their farecards at any door on trains. However, delays to the AFC 2.0 system means the GLX opened prior to all-door boarding being implemented.

Station	City	Neighborhood(s)	Service(s)	Opening
Lechmere	Cambridge	Northpoint / East Cambridge	D, E	March 21, 2022
Union Square Branch
Union Square	Somerville	Union Square / Ward Two	D	March 21, 2022
Medford Branch
East Somerville	Somerville	East Somerville	E	December 12, 2022
Gilman Square	Somerville	Winter Hill / Gilman Square	E	December 12, 2022
Magoun Square	Somerville	Magoun Square	E	December 12, 2022
Ball Square	Somerville / Medford	Ball Square	E	December 12, 2022
Medford/Tufts	Medford	South Medford / Tufts University	E	December 12, 2022
Mystic Valley Parkway	Somerville	West Somerville	E	Proposed

== Prior proposals ==
=== Early transit services ===
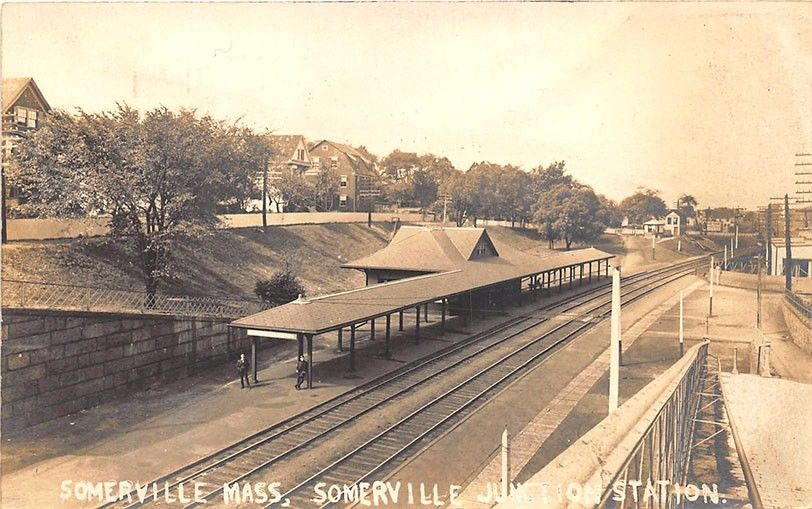
Early-20th-century postcard of Somerville Junction station

The Boston and Lowell Railroad (B&L) opened through South Medford, Somerville, and East Cambridge in 1835. Passenger service initially ran express between the two cities, but local stops were soon added. The Charlestown Branch Railroad opened through Somerville and Charlestown in 1842; it was soon extended as the Fitchburg Railroad. In 1870, the B&L built a cutoff from Lake Street to Somerville Junction, which allowed Lexington Branch trains to enter Boston on the B&L. The Massachusetts Central Railroad began service in 1881; it used most of the 1870-built cutoff to reach Boston. It was leased in 1886 by the B&L, which was in turn leased by the Boston and Maine Railroad (B&M) in 1887 as its Southern Division. The Fitchburg was leased by the B&M in 1900 as the Fitchburg Division. By the early 20th century, the Southern Division had stations at Medford Hillside and Tufts College in South Medford; North Somerville, Somerville Junction, Winter Hill, and Prospect Hill in Somerville; and East Cambridge. Stations were located on the Lexington Branch at North Cambridge, West Somerville, and Somerville Highlands. The Fitchburg Division had stations at Cambridge, Somerville, and Union Square.

Horsecar service by the Cambridge Railroad in Somerville began in 1858 with lines from Union Square to Sullivan Square and to Elm Street (now Davis Square) via Somerville Avenue. The Cambridge Railroad was granted permission in 1860 to run tracks over the Craigie Bridge from East Cambridge to Boston, joining with its existing line on Cambridge Street from Harvard Square, though service did not begin until around 1862. The Somerville Avenue line was extended from Union Square to Boston in 1864, joining the existing line at Lechmere Square in East Cambridge. The Cambridge Street line was converted to electric streetcar service by Cambridge Railroad successor West End Street Railway in 1891; the Somerville Avenue line and an 1888-built line to Davis Square via Highland Avenue were electrified and extended to Clarendon Hill in 1893–1895.

The West End was leased to the Boston Elevated Railway (BERy) in 1897. The three streetcar lines running through Lechmere Square began running into the Tremont Street subway upon its September 3, 1898, opening. Slow and unreliable service on the surface streetcar lines resulted in congestion in the subway. The Lechmere Viaduct and Causeway Street elevated opened on July 1, 1912, creating a grade-separated route from Lechmere Square to the subway and bypassing the Cragie Bridge. However, the surface lines through Somerville continued to be unreliable, and multiple-car trains were needed to increase subway capacity. On July 10, 1922, the BERy opened Lechmere station as a transfer point. Passengers on the Harvard Square and Clarendon Hill surface lines transferred to two-and-three-car subway trains, bringing rapid transit-style service to Lechmere.

=== Early proposals ===
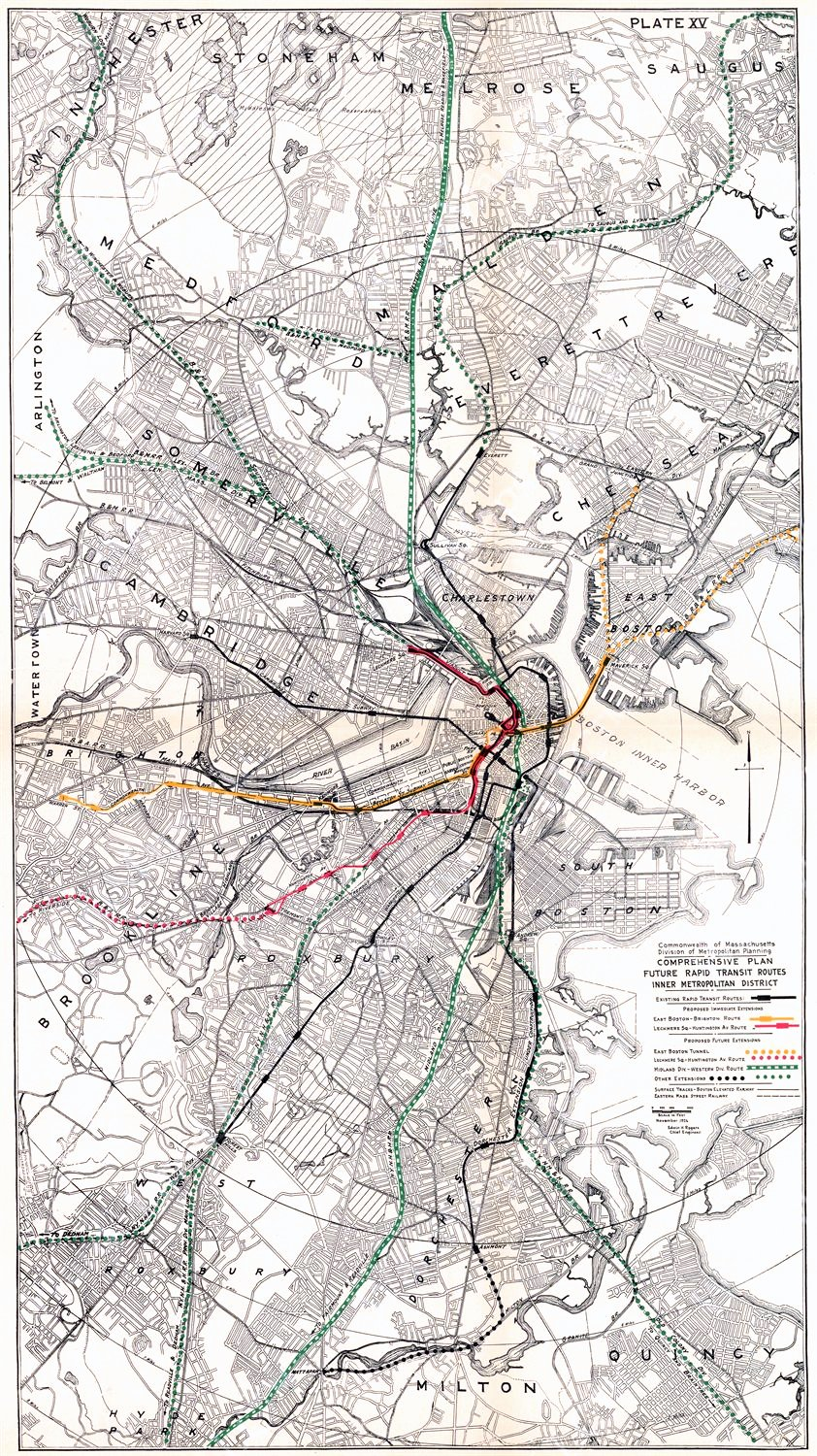
Map showing the 1926-proposed extensions northwest from Lechmere (at left)

In 1907, the BERy proposed a branch of the Charlestown Elevated following Mystic Avenue from Sullivan Square to Medford Square. In 1922, with the downtown subway network and several radial lines in service, the BERy indicated plans to build three additional radial subways: one paralleling the Midland Branch through Dorchester, a second branching from the Boylston Street subway to run under Huntington Avenue, and a third extending from Lechmere Square northwest through Somerville. (The Dorchester line was eventually built as an extension of the Cambridge–Dorchester Tunnel later that decade, while a shorter Huntington Avenue subway opened in 1941.)

The Report on Improved Transportation Facilities, published by the Boston Division of Metropolitan Planning in 1926, was the first comprehensive transit plan for the Boston area since the 1890s. The core recommendation of the report was a conversion of the Tremont Street subway to Maverick Square–Warren Street, Brighton and Lechmere Square–Brigham Circle, Roxbury rapid transit routes. Several suburban rapid transit extensions were proposed as secondary priorities; one would run in a dedicated median in the Northern Artery from Lechmere to Winter Hill, alongside the B&M Southern Division tracks to Somerville Junction, then follow the cutoff (by then called the Fitchburg Cutoff) to North Cambridge. Several branches of that line were listed as possible extensions: North Cambridge to Bedford via the Lexington Branch, North Cambridge to Waltham via the Fitchburg mainline, and Somerville Junction to Woburn via the Southern Division and Woburn Branch.

Variations on this plan were proposed several times during the 1930s. A 1935 proposal by a citizen's group called for a subway extension from Haymarket or Bowdoin surfacing in the North Station rail yards, then following the Southern Division and the Fitchburg Cutoff to Alewife Brook Parkway in North Cambridge. "High-speed trolley connections" would run to Arlington Heights and Belmont. A new expressway would have taken over the Causeway Street elevated and Lechmere Viaduct, then largely paralleled the new transit line to connect with the existing Mohawk Trail expressway at Alewife Brook Parkway. A 1938 proposal by Somerville mayor John M. Lynch called for an extension of the East Boston Tunnel from Bowdoin to the Lechmere Viaduct, a subway from Lechmere to Washington Street, and use of the Southern Division, Fitchburg Cutoff, and Lexington Branch to reach Arlington Center. A 1939 state resolve directed the Metropolitan District Commission to study that proposal.

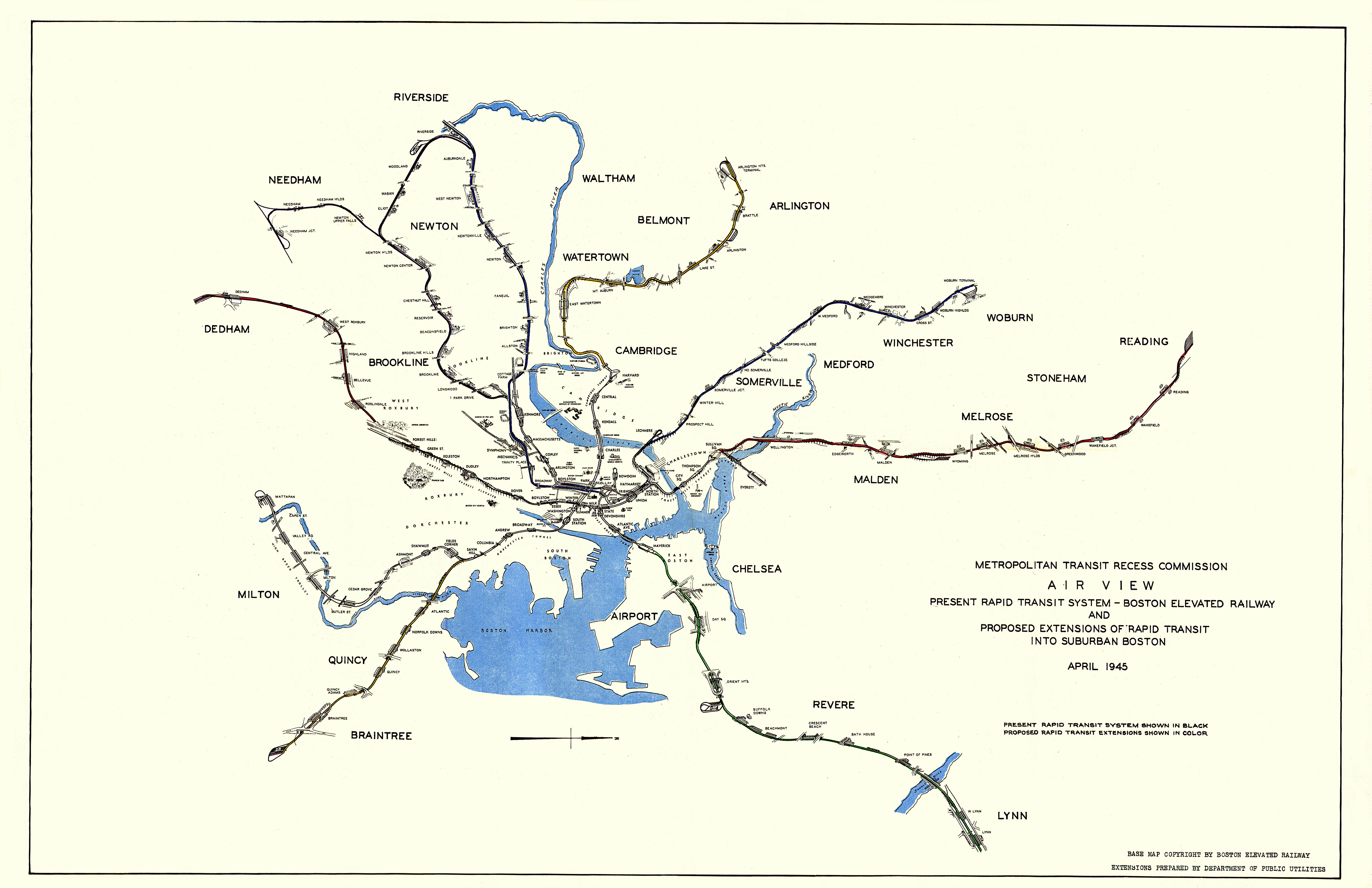
Map of the 1945 extension proposals

Transit service in Somerville declined during this period due to the Great Depression and competition from autos, many using the 1927-completed Northern Artery. East Cambridge, Prospect Hill, and the three Fitchburg Cutoff stations closed in 1927. Winter Hill closed in the 1930s, Union Square and Somerville in 1938, and Somerville Junction in the 1940s. The Harvard Square–Lechmere route (now route 69) was converted to trackless trolley in 1936. By 1940, six streetcar routes remained in Somerville: route 87 Clarendon Hill–Lechmere via Somerville Avenue, route 88, Clarendon Hill–Lechmere via Highland Avenue, routes 89 Clarendon Hill–Sullivan Square and 101 Salem Street–Sullivan Square on Broadway, and two routes on the Fellsway running through East Somerville. Routes 87 and 88 were converted to trackless trolley in 1941; following heavy wartime ridership, routes 89 and 101 were converted in 1947. Service on the Fellsway, which included Eastern Massachusetts Street Railway service to Stoneham until 1946, lasted until 1955.

In 1943, the state legislature appointed a commission headed by Arthur W. Coolidge to plan for the future of transit in the Boston region. In 1945, a preliminary report from the Coolidge Commission recommended nine suburban rapid transit extensions – most similar to the 1926 plan – along existing railroad lines. The proposed extension from Lechmere to Woburn followed the same alignment as the 1926 plan, albeit using an extended elevated structure rather than a subway north of Lechmere. A short subway segment was to be built to avoid the grade crossings at Winchester Center. Annual ridership on the 9.18-mile (14.77 km) extension was estimated to be 11.8 million based on B&M and BERy ridership. The 1947 final report modified some routes; the Woburn route was to be extended an additional 2 miles (3 km) to North Woburn. Cost was estimated at $3.627 million in 1941 dollars (equivalent to $59 million in 2024). The Coolidge Commission also laid the groundwork for the 1947 transition of the BERy to public ownership as the Metropolitan Transit Authority (MTA).

In 1958, the B&M ended service to Medford Hillside, Tufts College, and North Somerville – the last three local stops south of West Medford – due to declining ridership. Route 101 was converted from trackless trolley to diesel bus in 1959; routes 69, 80 (not a former streetcar line), 87, 88, and 89 were all converted in 1963, leaving buses as the only remaining transit in Somerville and South Medford. The 1962 North Terminal Area Study, claiming that the 1959 Highland branch conversion showed that PCC streetcars were inadequate for suburban rapid transit service, recommended that the elevated Lechmere–North Station segment be abandoned. The Main Line (now the Orange Line) was to be relocated along the B&M Western Route; it would have a branch to Woburn or Arlington via the Southern Division.

=== MBTA era ===
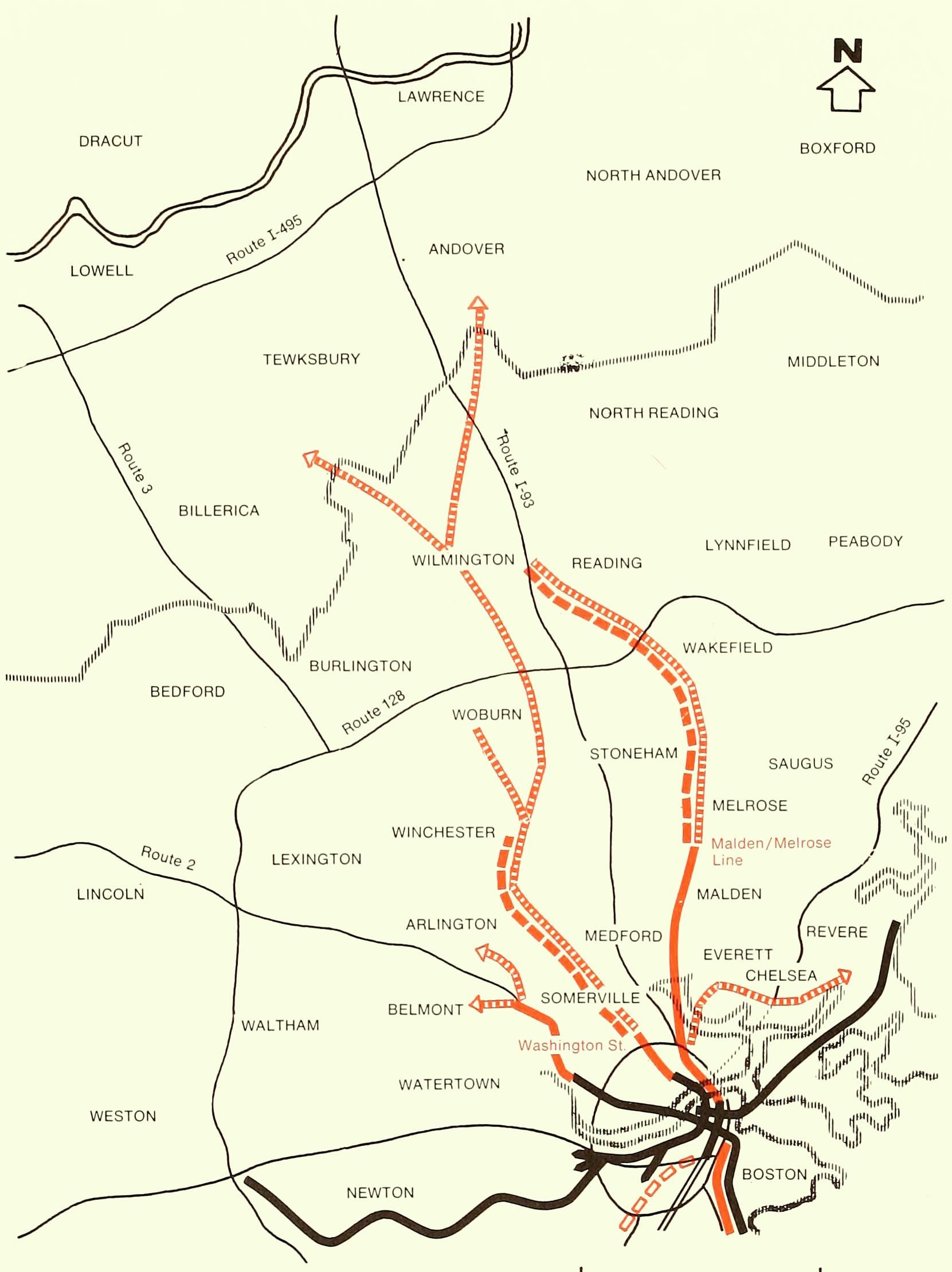
Map showing the 1966-proposed extensions northwest from Lechmere (at center)

The Massachusetts Bay Transportation Authority (MBTA) was formed in 1964 as an expansion of the MTA to subsidize suburban commuter rail service, as well as to construct rapid transit extensions to replace some commuter rail lines. In 1965, as part of systemwide rebranding, the Tremont Street subway and its connecting lines became the Green Line. The 1966 Program for Mass Transportation, the MBTA's first long-range plan, listed an approximately 1-mile (1.6 km) extension from Lechmere to Washington Street as an immediate priority. New Hampshire Division (Southern Division) passenger service would be cut back from North Station to a new terminal at Washington Street. A second phase of the project would extend Green Line service from Washington Street to Mystic Valley Parkway (Route 16) or West Medford.

The 1972 final report of the Boston Transportation Planning Review listed a Green Line extension from Lechmere to Ball Square as a lower priority. The cost of the extension was estimated as $26 million (equivalent to $191 million in 2024). Extension past Lechmere was listed as low priority in a 1974 plan due to the addition of Davis station to the planned Red Line Northwest Extension. (Davis opened in 1984 as the first MBTA subway station in Somerville.) An extension to Tufts University was listed as a proposal in the 1978 and 1983 updates to the Program for Mass Transportation.

In 1980, the MBTA began a study of the "Green Line Northwest Corridor" (from Haymarket to Medford) with three area of focus: replacement of the Causeway Street elevated, replacement of Lechmere station, and extension beyond Lechmere. An evaluation report for the extension was published in 1981 and updated in 1984. Alternatives recommended for further evaluation included a Green Line extension to Tufts, a Green Line extension to Union Square, and a busway to Tufts and Davis. Later in the 1980s, the MBTA made plans to relocate Lechmere station as a precursor to an extension. A new elevated station would be located on the east side of the O'Brien Highway, with a new vehicle storage yard and maintenance facility to the north. The project was not pursued due to lack of available funding.

== Green Line Extension planning ==
=== Early planning ===
In 1991, the state agreed to build a set of transit projects as part of an agreement with the Conservation Law Foundation (CLF), which had threatened a lawsuit over auto emissions from the Central Artery/Tunnel Project (Big Dig). Among these projects was a "Green Line Extension To Ball Square/Tufts University", to be complete by the end of 2011. While many of the projects were completed over the next 14 years, including the Old Colony Lines restoration and the South Boston Piers Transitway, the Green Line Extension was not advanced into planning. The 2003 Program for Mass Transportation considered both Green Line and Blue Line extensions to West Medford, including possible alignments through Union Square. Both modes were rated medium priority; the Blue Line version was twice as expensive due to the need to tunnel under the Charles River. In March 2005, with the extension not in the MBTA's five-year plan, the city of Somerville and the CLF filed a lawsuit against the state for breaching the 1991 agreement.

In May 2005, the state announced an updated agreement, which revised the set of committed projects. Improvements to the Fairmount Line and increased Framingham/Worcester Line service were added; the Red-Blue Connector and Arborway service restoration were removed. The Green Line Extension was changed to include a branch to Union Square, with the main branch running to Medford Hillside. The project was estimated to cost $559 million (equivalent to $860 million in 2024). While the city of Medford was supportive of an extension as far as Medford Hillside, a potential further terminus at West Medford had less local support.

The Beyond Lechmere Northwest Corridor Study, a Major Investment Study/alternatives analysis, was published in 2005. The analysis studied a variety of Green Line extensions (including a West Medford branch, a Union Square branch, both branches, and an extension to West Medford via Union Square and a tunnel under Prospect Hill), bus rapid transit (BRT) to West Medford and/or Union Square, commuter rail shuttles to West Medford or Anderson RTC with additional stops, and combinations of those modes. The highest-rated alternatives were Green Line to West Medford (estimated cost $390 million), Green Line to both West Medford and Union Square ($438 million), and Green Line to Union Square plus BRT to West Medford ($340 million).

The 2005 litigation was resolved by a November 2006 court settlement under which the Green Line Extension was to be completed in 2014. This was approved by the Environmental Protection Agency in July 2008. Proposed station sites were announced in May 2008: Union Square, Brickbottom, Gilman Square, Lowell Street, Ball Square, Medford Hillside (between College Avenue and Winthrop Street), and Route 16. The former Yard 8 (located between the GLX tracks and Inner Belt Road) was chosen as the site for a maintenance and storage facility. The project was widely supported in Somerville, where it was seen as a development catalyst and a correction for past transportation injustices, but was less popular in more suburban Medford. Several potential tunnel alternatives – from Ball Square to Alewife, an underground station at Union Square, and tunneling all or part of the Medford Branch – were analyzed in 2008 and found not to be cost-effective.

=== Environmental review ===
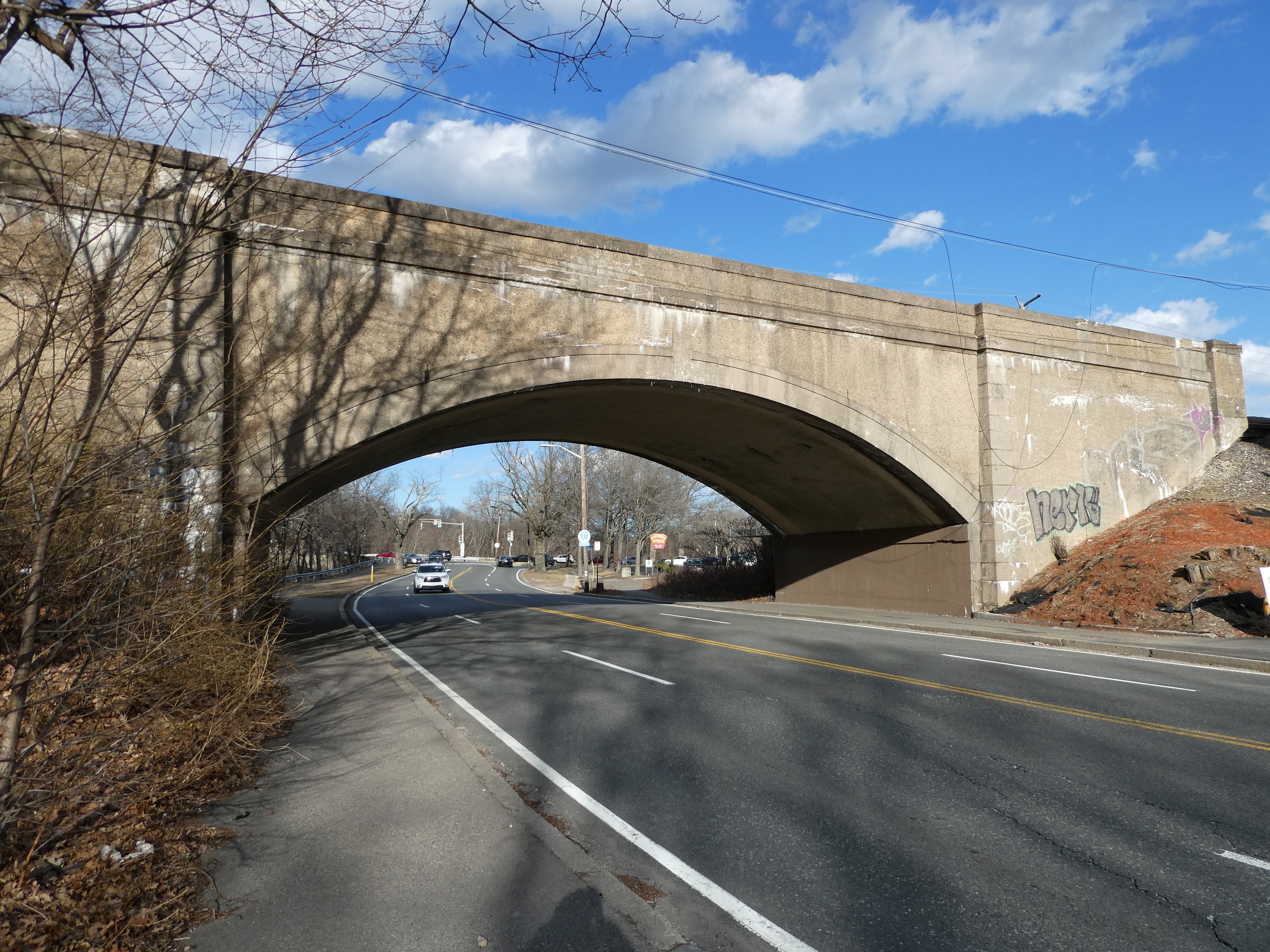
The cost of modifying this bridge over Mystic Valley Parkway was cited as one of the reasons for eliminating West Medford as a possible terminus.

The Massachusetts Executive Office of Transportation and Public Works submitted an Expanded Environmental Notification Form (EENF) to the Massachusetts Executive Office of Environmental Affairs in October 2006. The EENF identified a Green Line extension with Medford and Union Square branches as the preferred alternative, and sought permission to conduction a single environmental impact report. That December, the Secretary of Environmental Affairs issued a certificate that instead required the preparation of separate draft (DEIR) and final (FEIR) environmental impact reports. Work on the DEIR began in September 2007.

The DEIR was released in October 2009. West Medford was eliminated as a possible terminus due to the cost of modifying bridges over the Mystic River and Mystic Valley Parkway, as well as safety issues with two grade crossings. The proposed Medford Hillside station was replaced with College Avenue to improve access from the neighborhood to the north. The preferred alternative had branches to Route 16 and Union Square; however, due to cost constraints, the Route 16 terminus was deferred to a second phase, with the proposed alternative terminating at College Avenue.

The FEIR was released in June 2010, with an estimated project cost of $845 million (equivalent to $1197 million in 2024). The primary change from the DEIR was the relocation of the maintenance facility about 1/4 mile (0.40 km) to the east (adjacent to the MBTA Commuter Rail Maintenance Facility) due to local objections to the original site. In July 2010, the Massachusetts Department of Transportation (MassDOT) announced that the project was delayed to October 2015.

In November 2010, the MBTA reached an agreement with Pan Am Railways and the NorthPoint developers under which the MBTA would receive property on the east side of O'Brien Highway needed for the new Lechmere station; in return, Pan Am would receive the existing Lechmere station site for redevelopment. The agreement, which also included MBTA trackage rights on the Worcester Branch and in New Hampshire, was amended in January 2011 and finalized that March.

An additional delay, with service beginning between late 2018 and 2020, was announced in August 2011. This delay was due to difficulties with land acquisition – due to issues with the Greenbush Line reopening, the state decided to acquire all property before beginning construction – and concerns about cost controls and financing. The delays beyond the legal deadline of December 31, 2014, created a requirement for MassDOT to implement interim projects to reduce emissions. The selected interim measures were increased midday frequency in the corridor (Green Line service to Lechmere plus bus routes 80, 88, 91, 94, and 96), the purchase of hybrid vehicles for The Ride, and completion of new parking garages at Salem and Beverly stations.

=== Funding and contracts ===
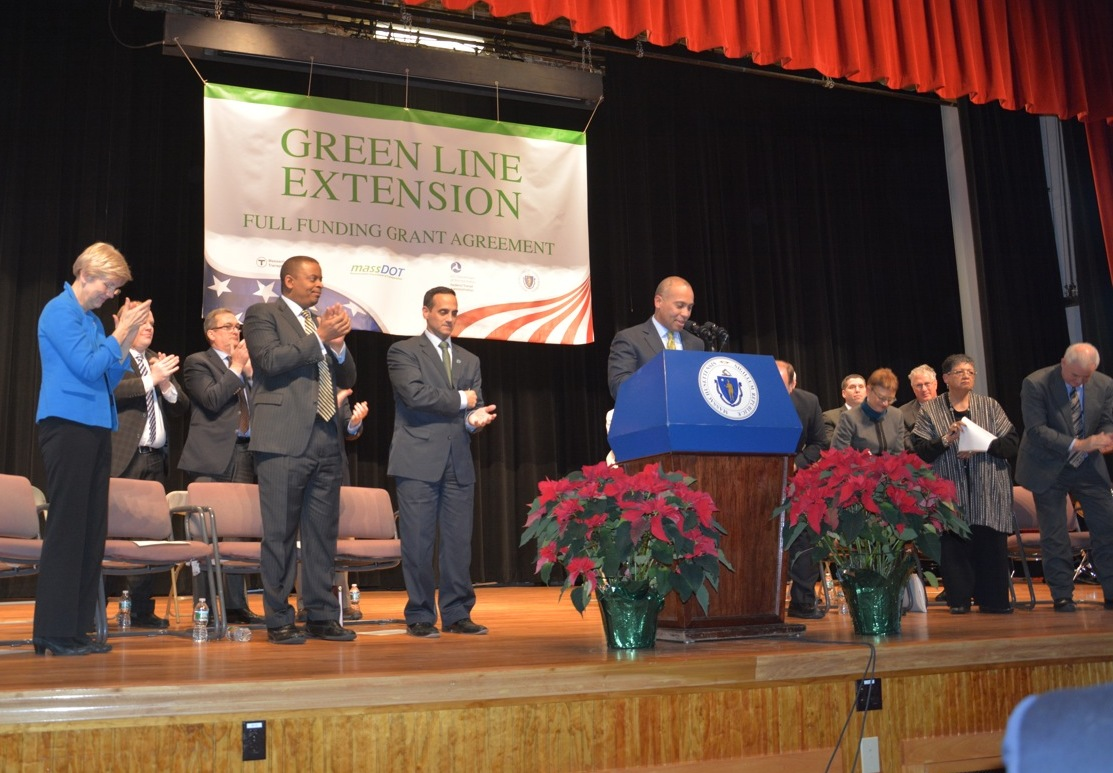
Press conference announcing the FFGA in January 2015

In June 2012, the project was accepted into the preliminary engineering phase of the Federal Transit Administration (FTA) New Starts program – a requirement to access federal funding. By that time, the project was planned to cost $1.34 billion, including $200 million in finance charges. The project received a Finding of No Significant Impact (FONSI) from the FTA in July 2012. This allowed the MBTA to open bidding on the Phase 1 construction contract. The $13 million contract was awarded to Barletta Heavy Division that December. Unlike later parts of the project, it used the traditional design–bid–build procurement method.

The City of Somerville, MassDOT, and the MBTA reached an agreement in August 2012 to open the Union Square Branch by early 2017, with construction to begin in 2014. In September 2013, MassDOT awarded a $393 million (equivalent to $520 million in 2024), 51-month contract for the construction of Phase 2/2A – Lechmere station, the Union Square Branch, and the first segment of the Medford Branch to Washington Street station – with the stations to open in early 2017. MassDOT intended to seek $557 million (equivalent to $737 million in 2024) in federal funds for Phase 3 (construction of the maintenance facility) and Phase 4 (construction of the remainder of the Medford Branch), which were to be completed in 2019 or 2020.

In April 2014, governor Deval Patrick signed a $12.8 billion bonding bill, which included up to $1.3 billion (equivalent to $2 billion in 2024) for the Green Line Extension. Later that month, MassDOT announced that the $39 million Somerville Community Path extension would be included in the GLX project. In May, MassDOT approved a $118 million contract with CAF USA to build 24 Type 9 LRVs to expand the Green Line fleet for GLX service. In September 2014, the MBTA indicated that the cost would be $2.3 billion – $1.6 billion direct cost plus $400 million contingency and $300 million finance charges. This represented a $200 million increase in direct costs due to the addition of the Somerville Community Path extension, additional viaduct work near Lechmere, and additional construction management by design contractor AECOM/HNTB. In December 2014, the FTA indicated that it would provide $996 million (equivalent to $1.3 billion in 2024) of the $2.3 billion (equivalent to $3 billion in 2024) total project cost, with the state funding the remaining portion. The Full Funding Grant Agreement (FFGA) was signed in January 2015.

=== Cost increase and redesign ===
Internal cost estimates began to diverge even before funding was arranged. Construction costs were estimated at $1.17 billion by construction manager White Skanska Kiewit (WSK) in December 2013, with total project cost of $2.35 billion. However, a month later, project manager HDR/Gilbane produced estimates of $853 million and $1.83 billion. The MBTA budgeted $1.99 billion in June 2014 for total cost ($2.3 billion including finance charges), using the HDR/Gilbane estimate; this estimate was announced in September and used for the FFGA.

In August 2015, the MBTA disclosed that projected costs had increased by $700 million–1 billion from the previous $1.99 billion figure. Prices of several portions of the project had risen substantially, with Phase 2/2A rising from $387 million to $898 million. Critics including the CLF blamed the use of construction manager/general contractor (CM/GC) procurement process, under which WSK was able to set the cost of each subcontract, rather than a traditional process where the costs were set during bidding. In December 2015, the MBTA ended its contracts with WSK and three other firms. Construction work in progress continued, but no new contracts were awarded. At that time, cancellation of the project was considered possible, as were elimination of the Union Square Branch and other cost reduction measures.

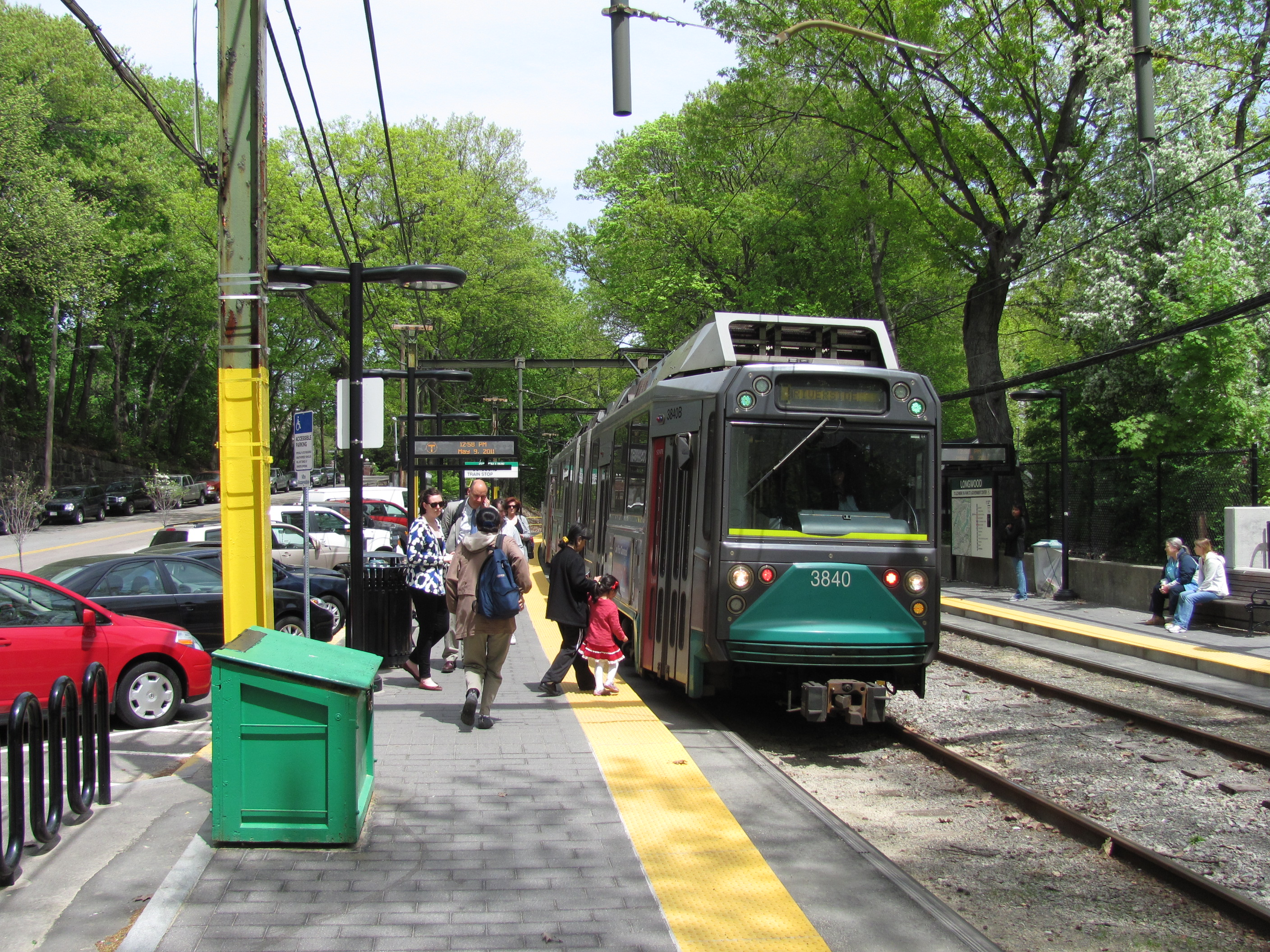
The scaled-down station designs were intended to resemble existing D branch surface stations like Longwood (pictured)

In May 2016, the MassDOT and MBTA boards approved a modified project that had undergone value engineering to reduce its cost. Stations were simplified to resemble D branch surface stations rather than full rapid transit stations, with canopies, faregates, escalators, and some elevators removed. Two bridge replacements were avoided, and two others were reduced in scale by building a new span behind one abutment. The vehicle maintenance facility was reduced by half, with storage for 44 LRVs rather than 88. The southern section of the Community Path was removed – prompting criticism from trail advocates – and the number of street access points was reduced. These changes were projected to reduce total project cost back to the $2.3 billion established in the FFGA.

That August, the FTA indicated it was "committed in principle" to the project but expressed reservations that any delays to the "optimistic" schedule could increase the project cost. A new project manager was hired in November 2016. In December 2016, the MBTA reached funding agreements under which Cambridge would contribute $25 million and Somerville $50 million. the MBTA announced a new planned opening date of 2021 for the extension. The FTA approved the revised cost estimate in April 2017. The first federal funds for the project were received in July 2017.

=== New contract ===
In February 2017, three consortia were shortlisted for the new design-build contract. The MBTA issued a final request for proposal to those three teams in May 2017. Proposals were required to be below an affordability limit of $1.319 billion in order to keep total project costs below $2.3 billion. Six additive options – elements removed during value engineering – were to be included if the teams could still meet cost and schedule requirements: station canopies, additional elevators at some stations, public art, an additional Community Path street connection, full-length extension of the Community Path, and improvements to the vehicle maintenance facility. In August 2017, construction manager CH2M was removed from the project to avoid a conflict of interest, as it was being acquired by Jacobs Engineering Group, which was also bidding on the construction contract.

The three proposals were received in September 2017. Two of the three proposals were certified in October 2017 as meeting the affordability limit. On November 17, 2017, the MBTA selected GLX Constructors (a consortium of Fluor Enterprises, the Middlesex Corporation, Herzog Contracting Corporation, and Balfour Beatty Infrastructure) to build the project. The consortium's base bid was $954 million, with all six additive options included; the $1.08 billion contract included contingency funds. The contract was awarded on November 20, 2017.

Several elements of the reduced-cost project design were criticized by community advocates and local politicians. E. Denise Simmons criticized the scaled-down station designs at Union Square and East Somerville for having long ramps rather than elevators, saying they were not sufficient for accessibility. The Community Path extension is 10 feet (3.0 m) wide, rather than the 11-foot (3.4 m) minimum in federal guidelines. The Friends of the Somerville Community Path criticized the path width, saying it would be a safety issue as cyclists in the same direction could not safely pass each other.

=== Mystic Valley Parkway extension ===
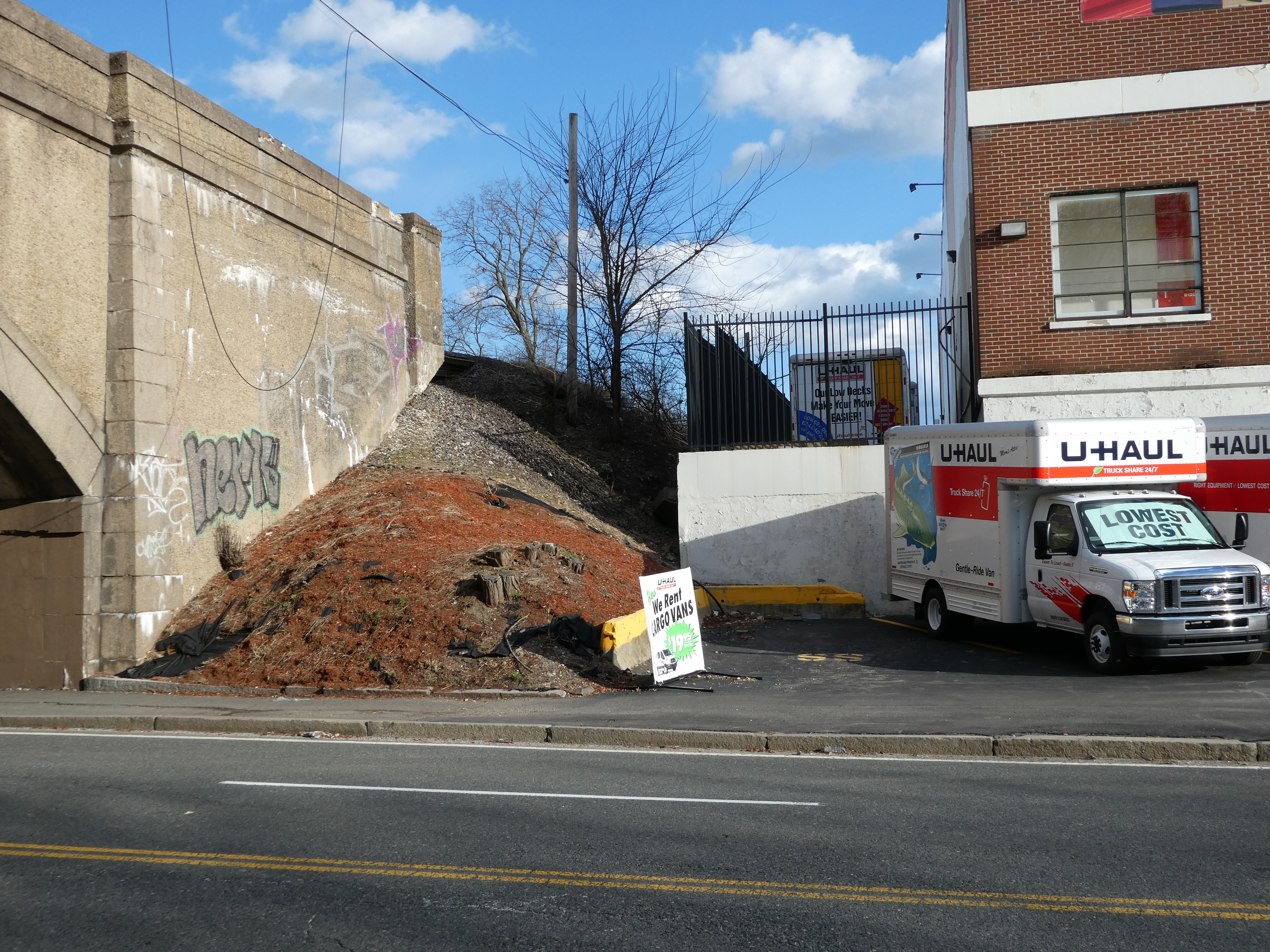
The proposed station site in 2022

The 1991 agreement to build the GLX specified "Ball Square/Tufts University" as the terminus; the 2005 update to the agreement substituted "Medford Hillside". By 2008, plans called for stations at Medford Hillside (between College Avenue and Winthrop Street) and Route 16/Mystic Valley Parkway. However, the 2009 draft environmental impact report replaced the Medford Hillside station with one slightly to the south at College Avenue, and deferred Mystic Valley Parkway to a future second phase. During the comment periods for the 2010 final environmental impact report and the 2011 environmental assessment, some residents in Medford and Somerville questioned the advantages and legality of this change, claiming that College Avenue was not part of the Medford Hillside neighborhood and thus that the Mystic Valley Parkway station was needed to fulfill the commitment. In January 2012, MassDOT stated that "the position of MassDOT and the MBTA on the configuration of the Green Line Extension is supported and has been reinforced by multiple regulatory agencies overseeing the [State Implementation Plan], including MassDEP."

Construction of the Mystic Valley Parkway station was later planned from Boston MPO funds for 2016–2020 after the rest of the line was to be complete; however, this funding was reallocated to the main project after the cost overruns. Some environmental review for the extension has taken place, with a notice of project change released in October 2017.

An extension of the Union Square Branch to Porter has also been proposed by local officials. Union Square station is designed so as to not preclude such an extension.

== Construction ==
=== Early work ===
Phase 1 consisted of the reconstruction of two railroad bridges (over Harvard Street in Medford and over Medford Street in Somerville) for Green Line tracks, and the demolition of a disused MBTA facility at 21 Water Street in Cambridge to make room for the new Lechmere station. Construction began with a groundbreaking ceremony held at the Medford Street bridge on December 11, 2012. Notice to proceed was issued to Barletta Heavy Division on January 31, 2013, and construction started in March. The 21 Water Street facility was demolished in August 2014. Originally planned to last until early 2015, Phase 1 work was completed in October 2015.

Notice to proceed with the Type 9 LRV contract was given to CAF in September 2014. The first LRV was delivered in March 2018 and entered service that December. The remaining 23 LRVs were delivered in 2018–2020 and entered service in 2019–2021.

Map of Phase 1 construction locations

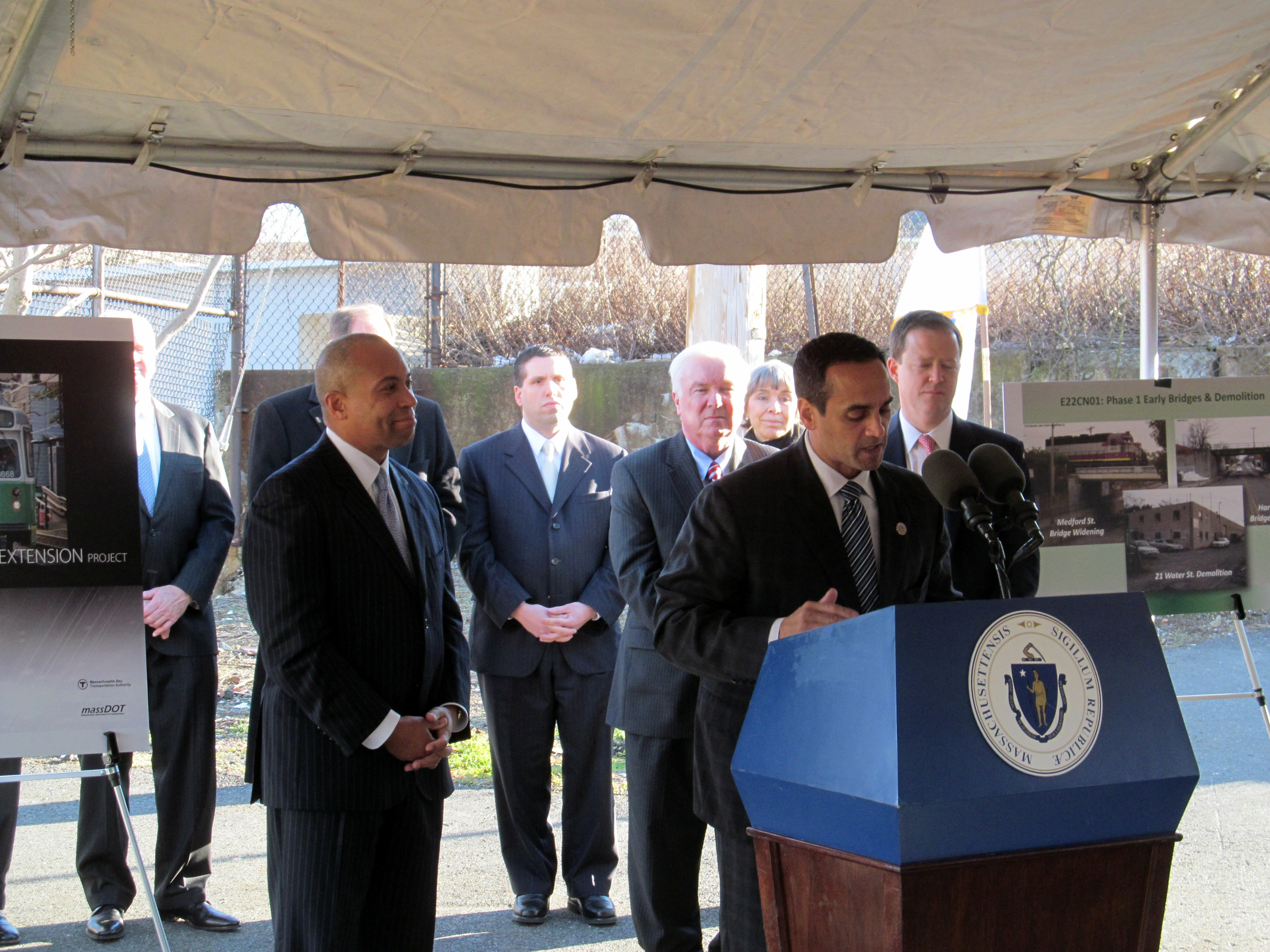
Somerville mayor Joseph Curtatone at the 2012 groundbreaking ceremony

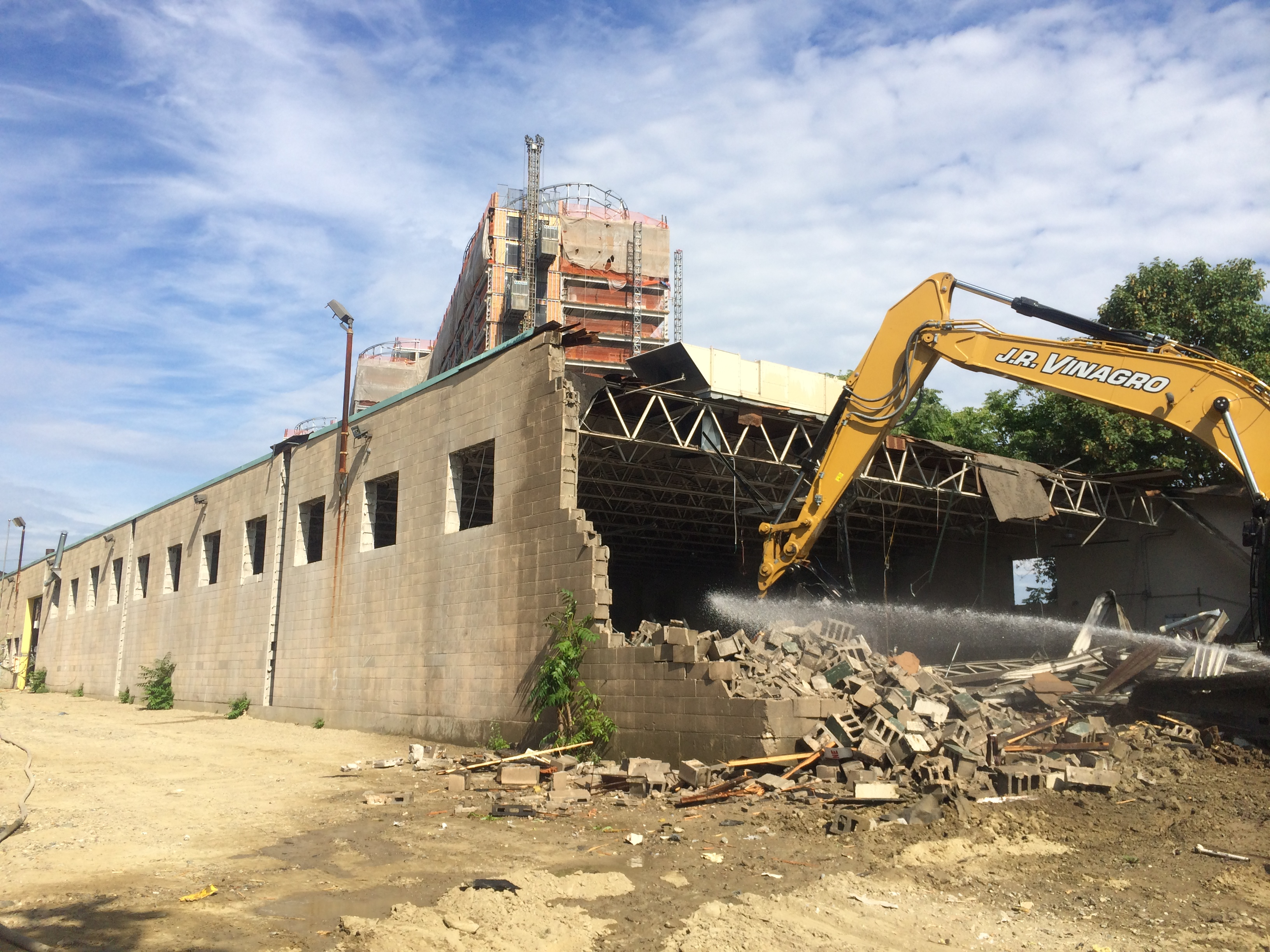
Demolition of the 21 Water Street facility in August 2014

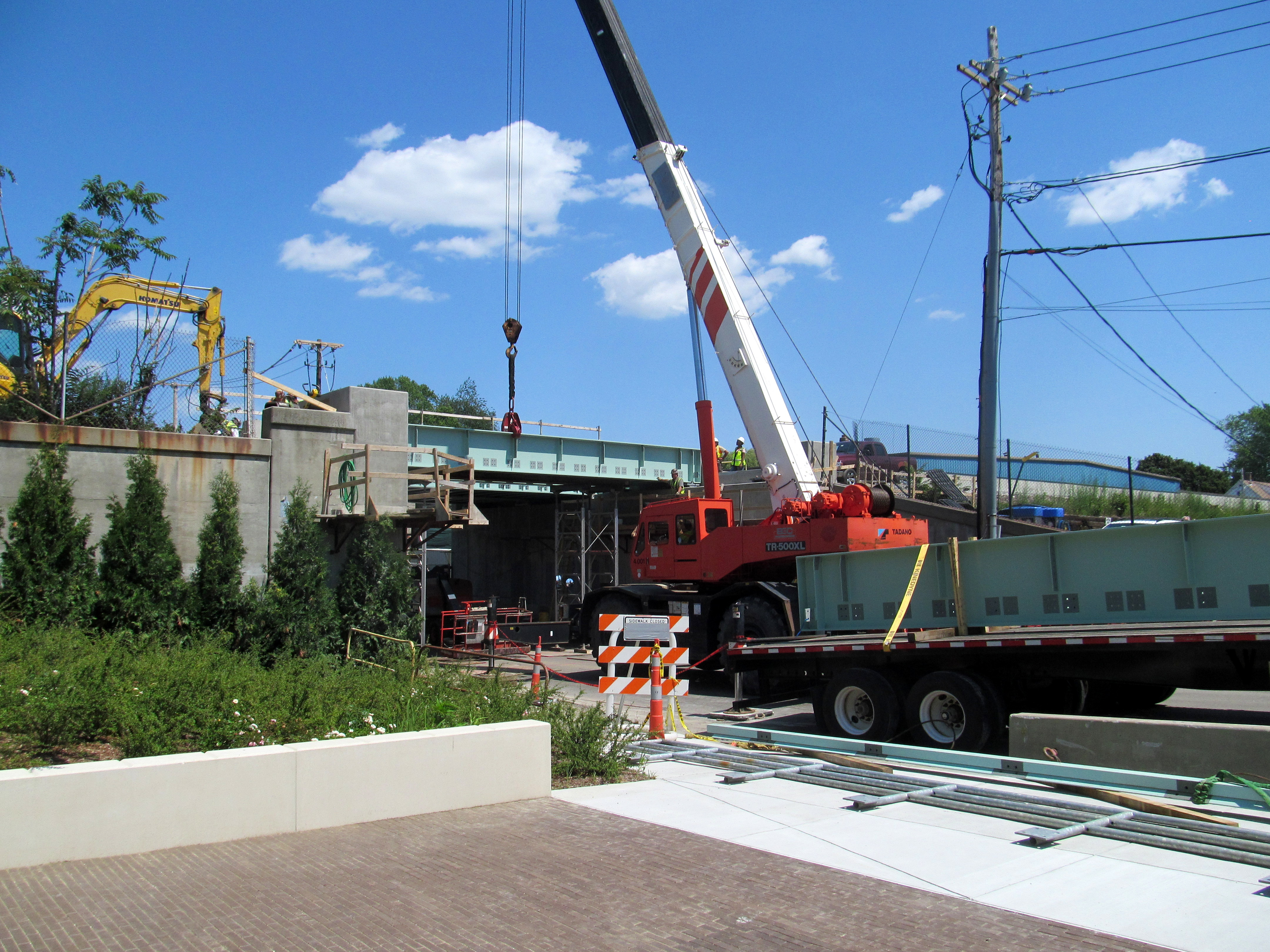
Harvard Street bridge work in July 2015

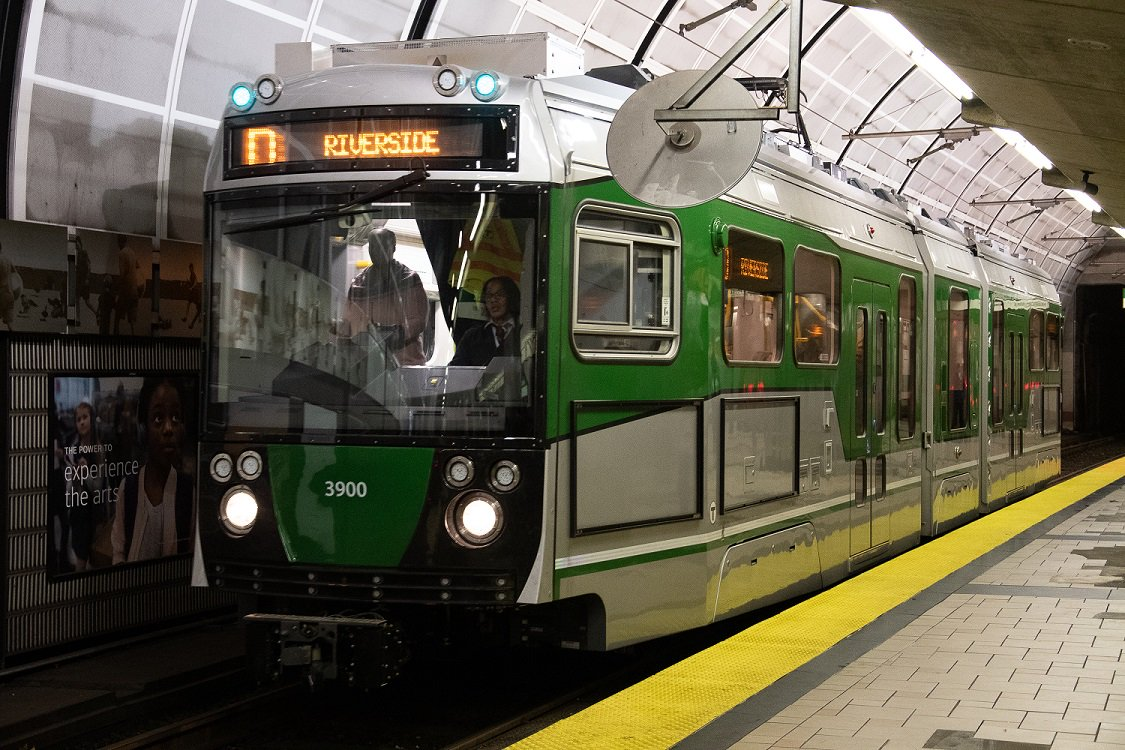
Type 9 LRV on its first day of service in 2018

=== Main project ===
I swore publicly that I would never come to another groundbreaking of the Green Line because I had already been to three. Today is different because this one is real. It’s been a long time coming.

— Mike Capuano, US Representative and former Somerville mayor, on the 2018 groundbreaking

Some construction work on the main project, including piers for the Red Bridge viaduct, took place in 2014–15 before the project was put on hold. The FTA released the first $100 million in funding in December 2017, allowing the MBTA to issue a notice to proceed for the main construction contract. Some work like tree clearing, removal of old siding tracks, and geotechnical boring took place in the first half of 2018, while design of stations and other complex elements continued. A groundbreaking ceremony was held on June 25, 2018. Viaduct construction, drainage work, and retaining wall and noise wall erection began in the second half of 2018. Temporary relocation of the Lowell Line tracks, which allowed for the construction of retaining walls to widen the cut to accommodate the GLX tracks, was completed in October 2018. By the end of 2018, station designs were 60% complete.

The Homans Building, a former food distribution facility adjacent to the Gilman Square station site, was demolished in April 2019. The pace of construction increased in mid-2019, with annual spending increasing from $170 million to $400 million. Four station designs reached 100% completion in October 2020, with the remaining three nearly complete. Construction reached 20% completion in November 2019. Viaduct spans were being installed by that time, and the commuter rail tracks were shifted to the east side of the cut (allowing construction on the Green Line tracks and stations to proceed) late in 2019.

The project required the temporary closure of three road bridges (Broadway, School Street, and Medford Street) and one underpass (Washington Street) for bridge reconstruction. All but School Street closed between March and May 2019; School Street closed in April 2020, with Washington Street and Broadway reopening that May and June. Medford Street reopened in July 2022 and School Street in December 2022. Green Line service was cut back from Lechmere to North Station effective May 24, 2020, to permit connection of the Lechmere Viaduct to the new GLX viaduct. (The work was originally expected to require closing the viaduct for 17 months – the third major disruption of Lechmere service since 2004 – causing opposition to the closure in Cambridge. In November 2019, plans were revised to reduce this to 11 months, although the viaduct ultimately remained closed until the start of service to Union Square in 2022, a period of 22 months.) Demolition of the old northern section of the Lechmere Viaduct began on June 6, 2020. The main section of the viaduct was rehabilitated during the closure under a separate project.

The project was over 50% completed by October 2020. Most station platform work took place in the second half of 2020; by the end of the year, steel canopies and other structures were under construction at several stations. The final concrete span of the Red Bridge viaduct was poured in December 2020, with ballast laid later that month and track laying starting in January 2021. By March 2021, the Union Square Branch was expected to open in October 2021, followed by the Medford Branch in December 2021. By the beginning of June 2021, 65% of track was in place, as were 8 of 9 signal houses.

In June 2021, the MBTA indicated an additional delay, due in part to effects from the COVID-19 pandemic, under which the Union Square Branch was planned to open in December 2021, followed by the Medford Branch in May 2022. The first test train was moved to the new VMF in August 2021 to begin testing of the Union Square Branch. Medford Branch testing was then expected to begin in late 2021 or early 2022. The Community Path extension will open along with the Medford Branch, as it is used for construction access. The D branch was extended to North Station on October 24, 2021, with the B and C branches moved to Government Center, as part of changes in preparation for the opening of the extension. In October 2021, the Union Square Branch opening was delayed to March 2022 due to delays with a substation at Red Bridge, with the Medford Branch opening likely delayed past May 2022. Train testing on the Union Square Branch began in December 2021.

The project reached 85% completion in November 2021. That month, MassDOT moved to return the contributions from Cambridge and Somerville, as the combination of construction being under budget and American Rescue Plan Act funds being received meant the municipal monies were not needed. Medford Branch testing began in May 2022 following the March 2022 opening of the Union Square Branch. Total project cost was estimated to be $2.28 billion: $0.996 billion from the federal government and $1.28 billion from state and other sources. Daily ridership on the extension was projected to be 45,000 by 2030.

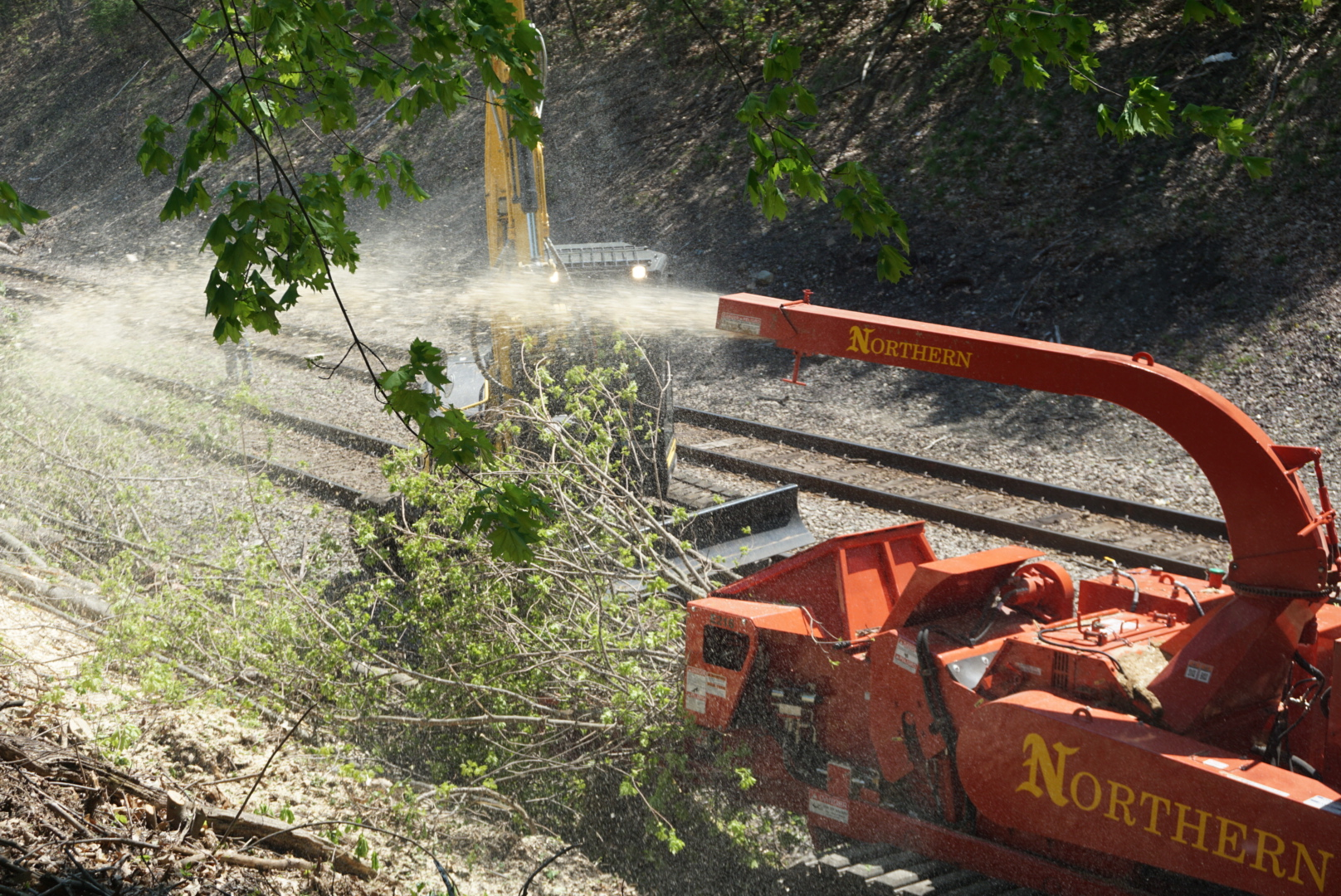
Brush clearing on the Medford Branch in April 2018

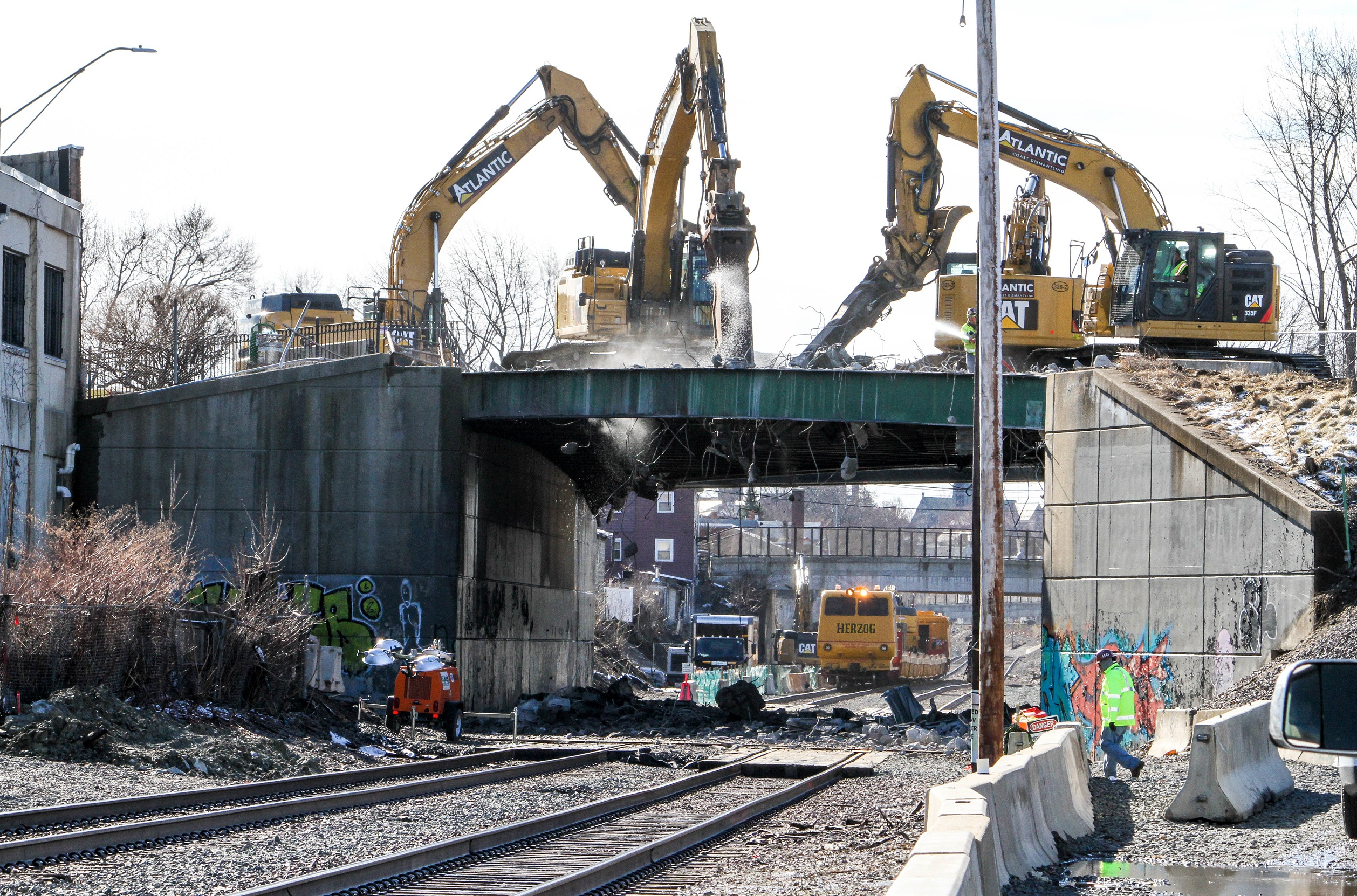
Broadway bridge under reconstruction in March 2019

Demolition of the Homans Building in April 2019

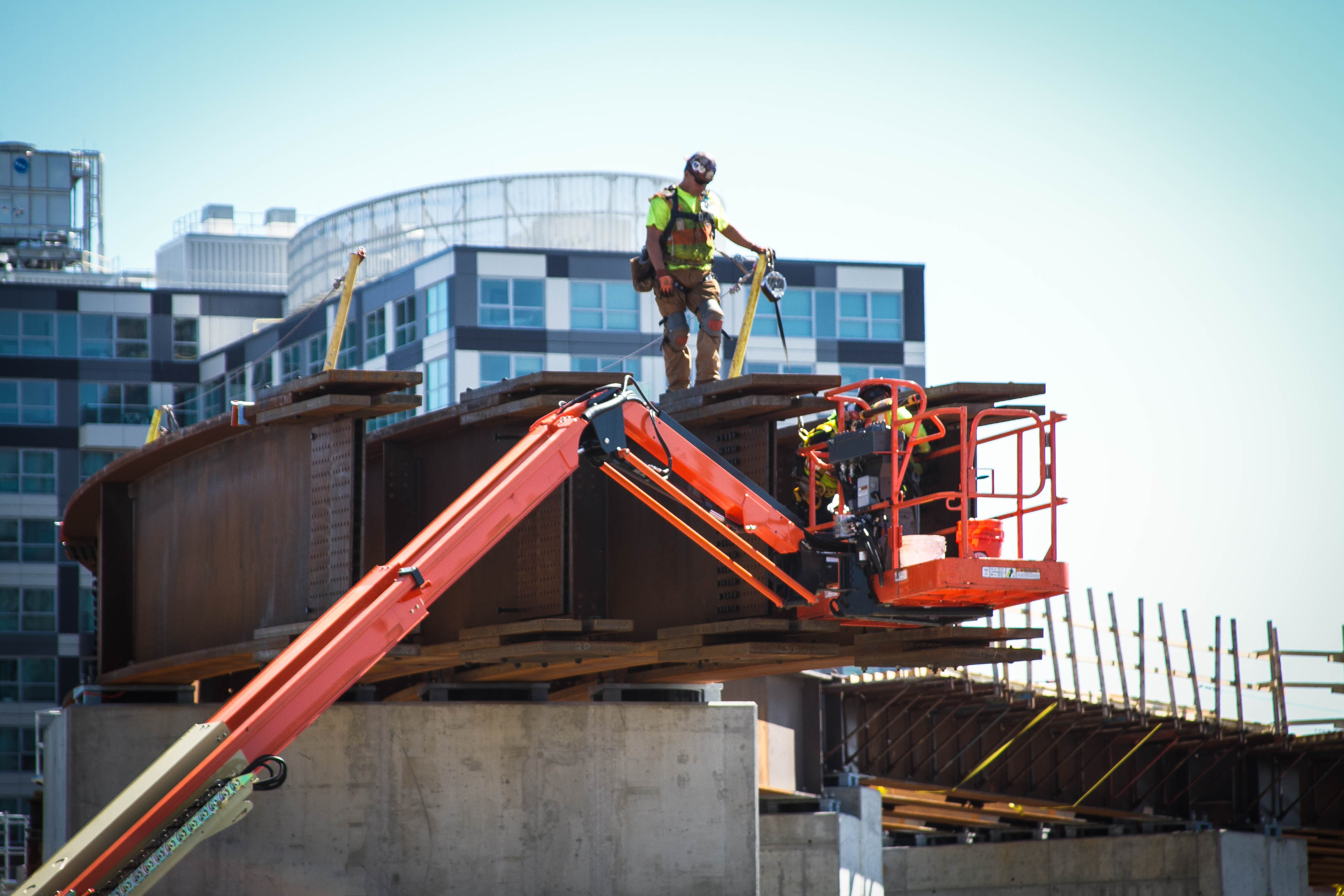
An ironworker on the Red Bridge viaduct in September 2019

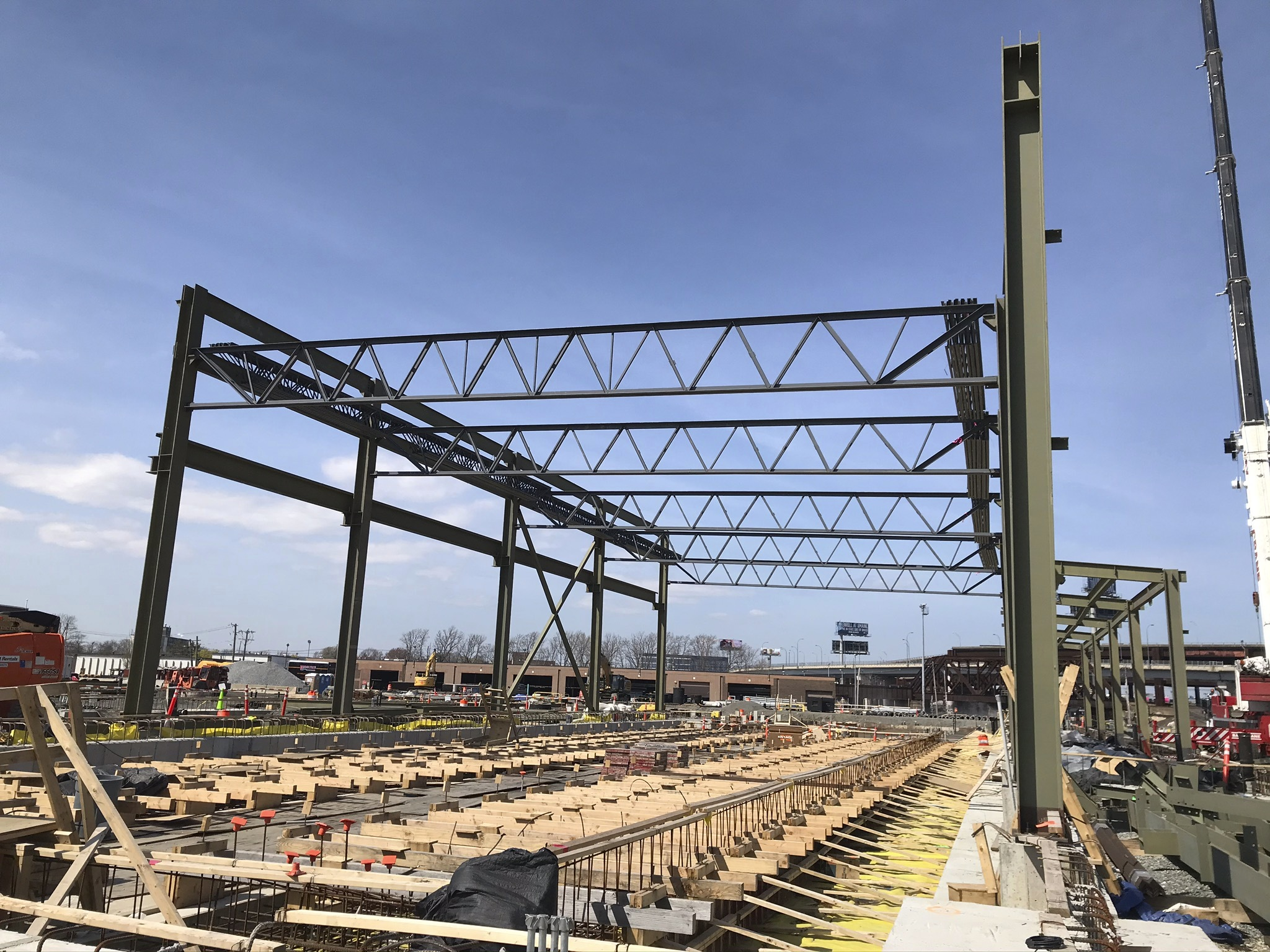
The frame of the vehicle maintenance facility in May 2020

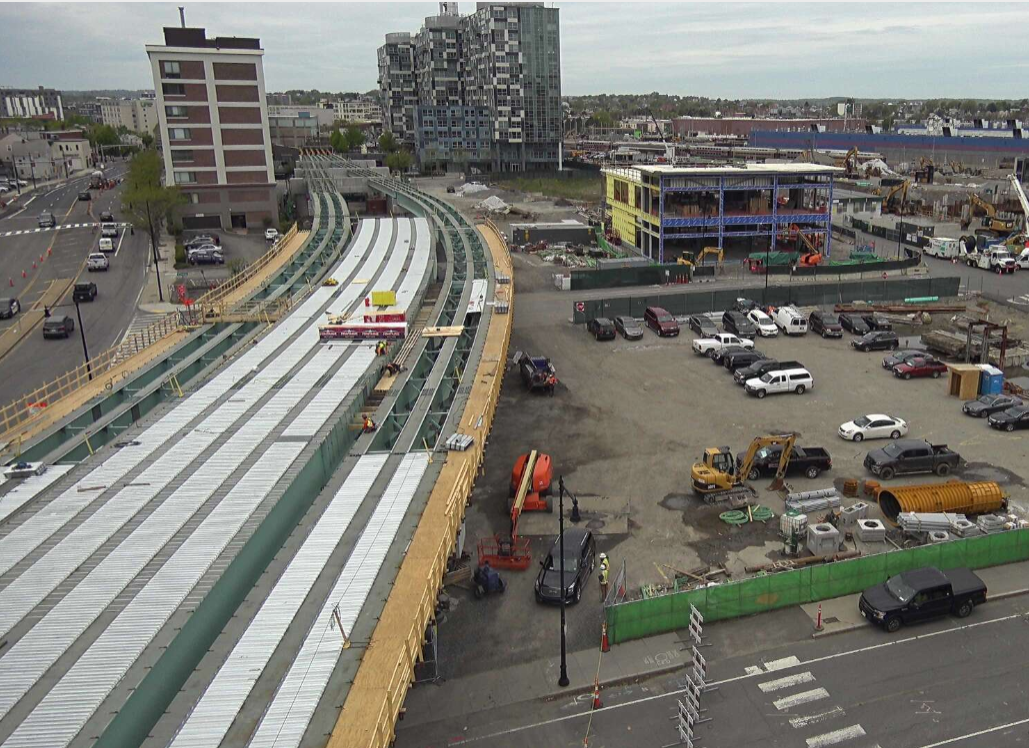
The new Lechmere station under construction in May 2020

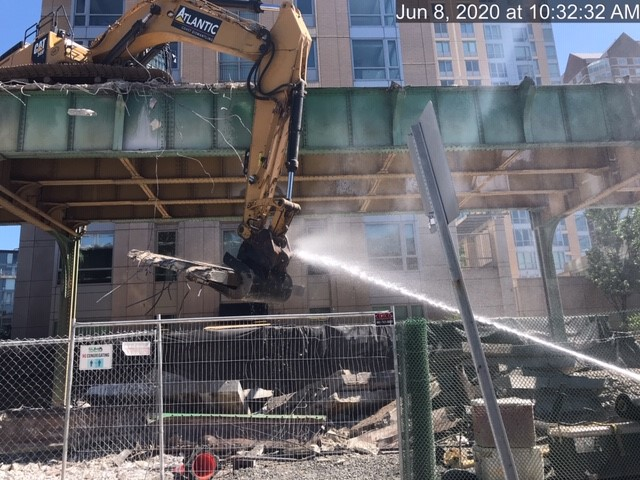
Demolition of the northern section of the Lechmere Viaduct in June 2020

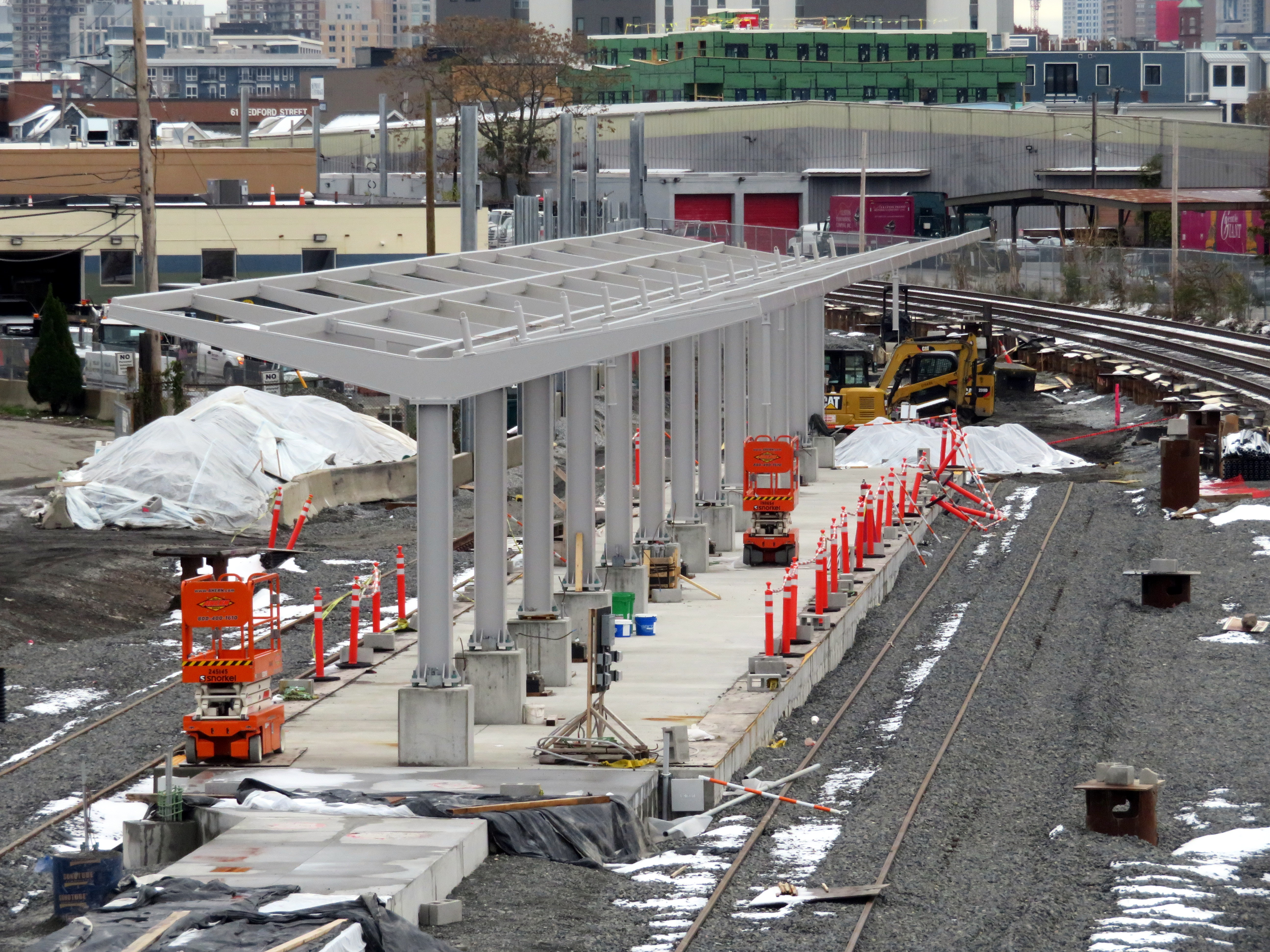
Union Square station with canopy frame in November 2020

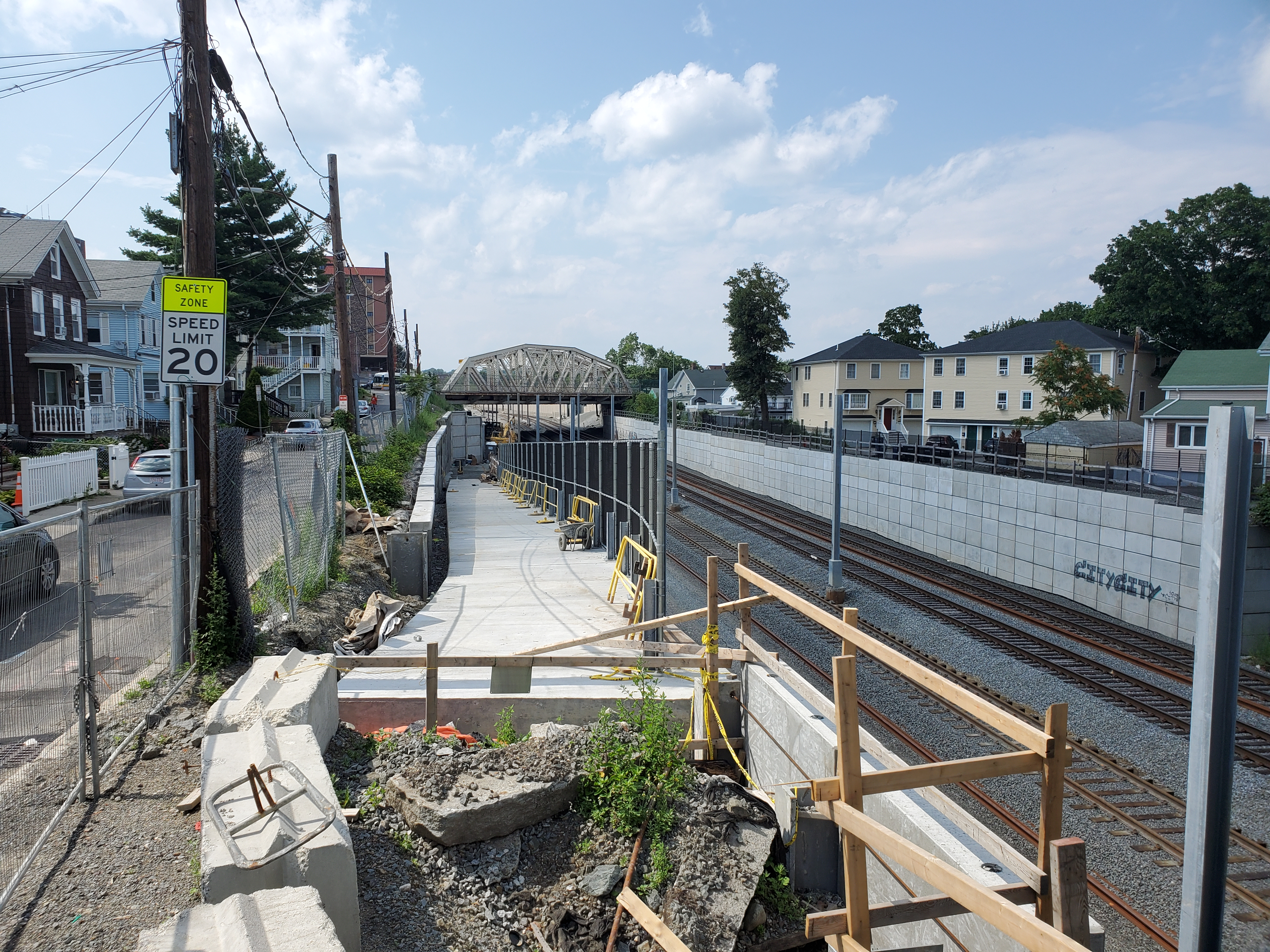
Ramp for the Somerville Community Path in July 2021

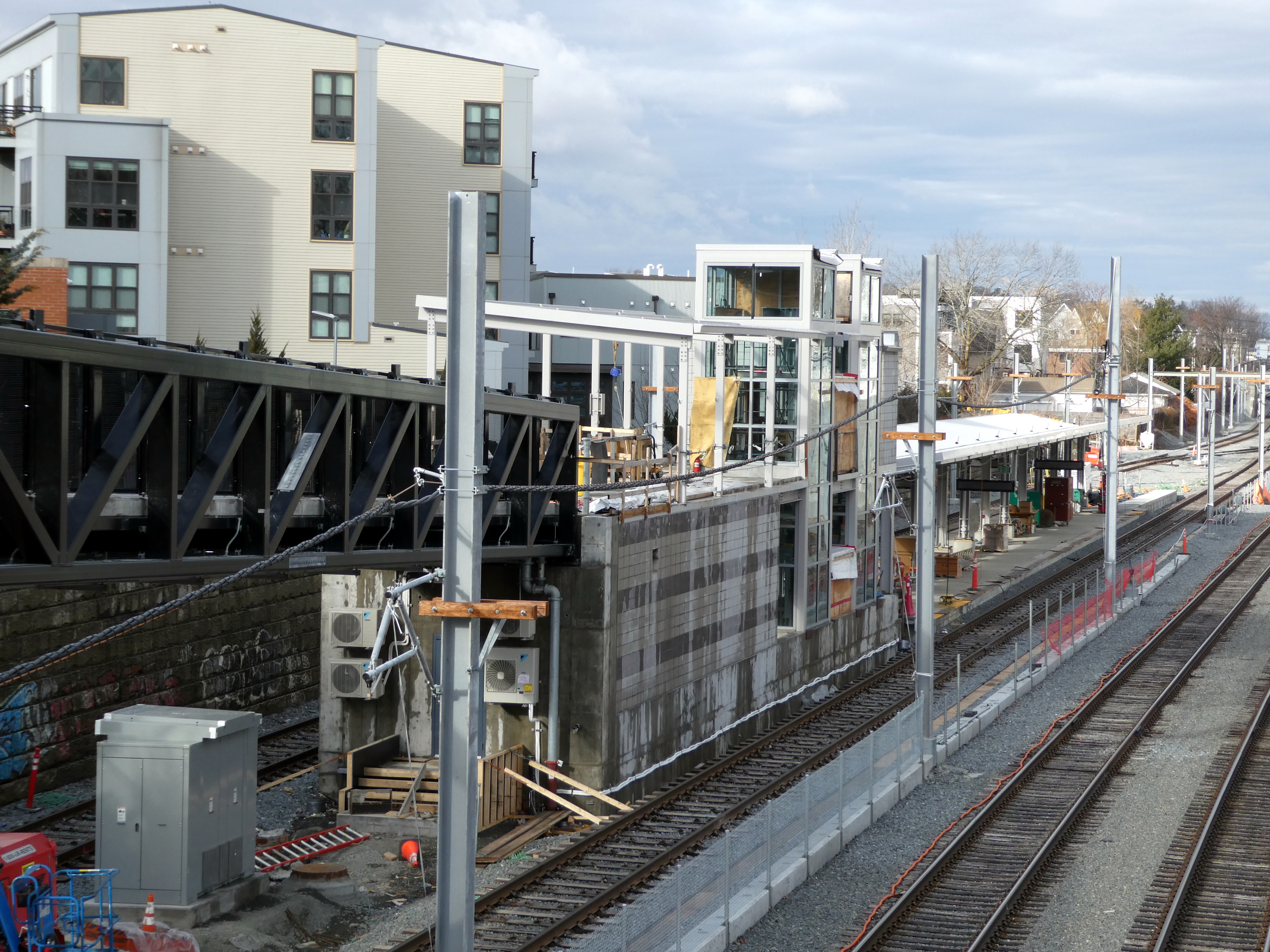
Magoun Square station nearing completion in December 2021

=== Operations planning and opening ===
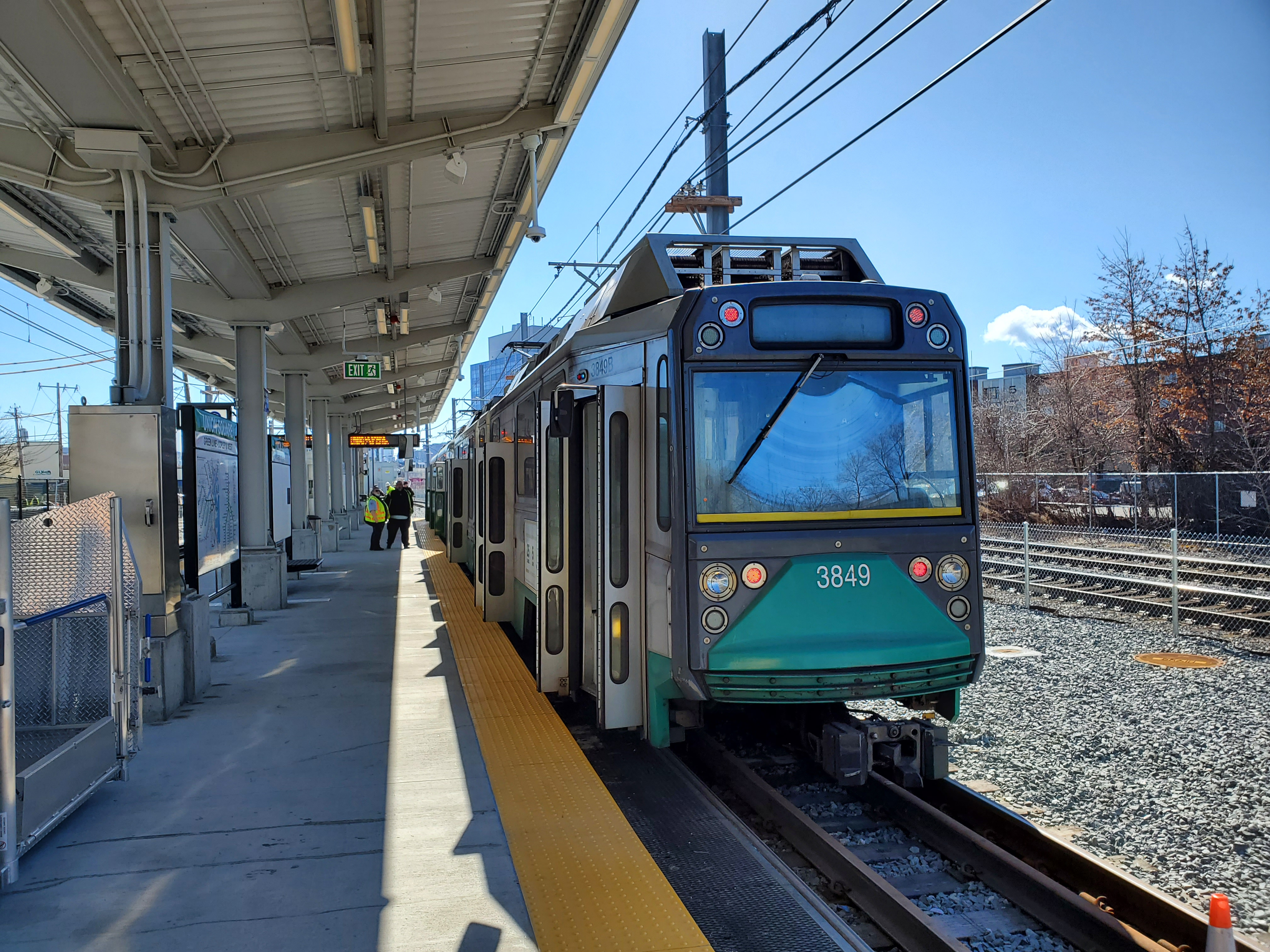
A train at Union Square on the first day of revenue service

Plans prior to construction called for the Union Square Branch to be through-routed with the E Branch and the Medford Branch to be through-routed with the D Branch. However, in April 2021, the MBTA indicated that these would be reversed, with the D going to Union Square and the E to Medford/Tufts. The D and E branches were chosen for the extension because they serve the Longwood Medical Area; the D branch was assigned to the shorter Union Square Branch because its western leg is longer than that of the E branch. However, the Union Square Branch was initially served by the E branch rather than the D branch.

Pre-revenue service, where trains on the Union Square Branch were operated on a revenue schedule but without passengers aboard, began on January 16, 2022. On February 24, 2022, the MBTA announced that Lechmere and the Union Square Branch would open on March 21, while the Medford Branch would open in "late summer". Service to Union Square began on March 21 as scheduled. In August 2022, the MBTA indicated that the Medford Branch opening was delayed to late November 2022 due to several factors including additional testing of the traction power system. The Union Square Branch was also closed from August 22 to September 18, 2022; the closure allowed for final integration of the Medford Branch, elimination of a speed restriction on the Lechmere Viaduct, demolition of the Government Center Garage, and other work. D and C branch trains served Union Square from August 6 to 21, 2022, while the E branch was closed for unrelated work, and primarily D branch service has served Union Square since September 19. The Medford Branch opened on December 12, 2022.

Somerville signed a lease agreement with the MBTA for the Community Path in February 2023. The extension opened on June 10, 2023. The Union Square Branch was closed from September 18 to October 10, 2023, during repairs to Squires Bridge, which carries the McGrath Highway over the tracks. The closure was originally planned for July 18 to August 28, but was delayed and shortened due to public criticism.

In June 2023, the MBTA added 600 feet (180 m) of temporary speed restrictions on GLX tracks – as slow as 3 miles per hour (5 km/h) – due to defects with the track gauge. This was increased to 1 mile (1.6 km) in September 2023. The speed restrictions were lifted in October. Later that month, the MBTA disclosed that the too-narrow track gauge was known by the MBTA as early as April 2021. To fix the issues, 50% of Union Square Branch track and 80% of Medford Branch track needed to be regauged by moving the tie plates. The work took place from November 27 to December 17, 2023.

In December 2023, the MBTA Board voted to acquire a property to expand the vehicle maintenance facility for future two-car trains of Type 10 vehicles. A tentative settlement reached with the property owner also allowed pedestrian connections to be built between East Somerville station and the Inner Belt area. A second entrance to the station opened in May 2025.

== Economic effects ==
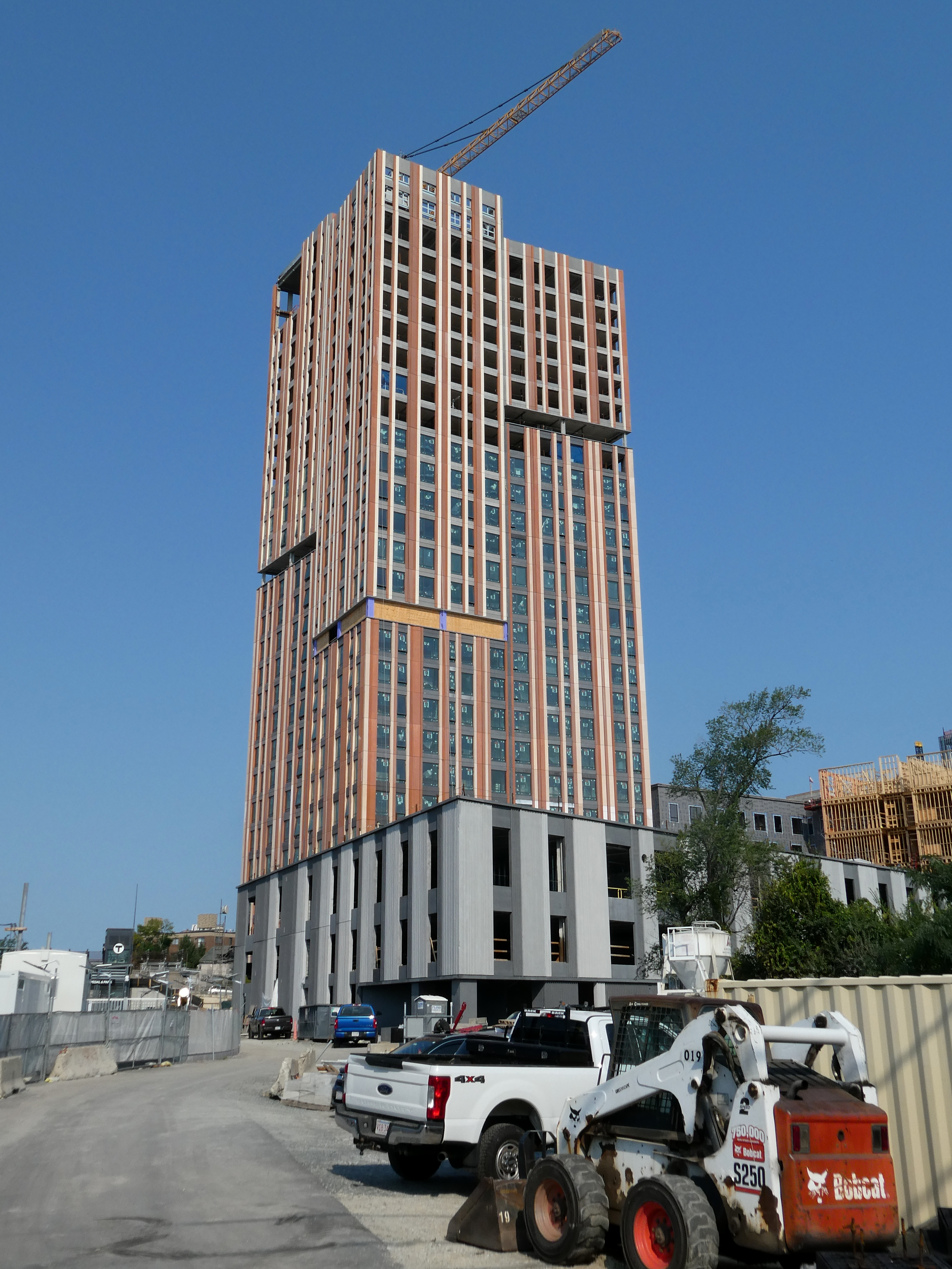
Building USQ D-2.3, a 25-story residential and commercial building being built adjacent to the Union Square Green Line station

The GLX was expected to have substantial economic benefits for Somerville. Along with Assembly station, it increased the proportion of the city's population within walking distance of rapid transit from 15% to 85%; 192 acres (78 ha) of land (mostly near Union Square) were opened for redevelopment in parallel with the project. Transit construction can result in gentrification – and displacement in turn – as wealthier residents seek to live close to stations, though this varies substantially depending on other factors like development planning. The 1984 opening of Davis station (Somerville's only transit station until Assembly station opened in 2014) resulted in gentrification and rising housing prices in the Davis Square neighborhood.

Residents and politicians raised concerns about gentrification and displacement resulting from the project even before construction began. A February 2014 study found that 740 to 810 households in the GLX corridor were at risk of displacement from projected rent increases, up to 475 at risk from conversion of apartments to condominiums, and 245 at risk from expiration of housing subsidies. Property tax increases were not expected to cause significant displacement. Some 6,300 to 9,000 new housing units would be needed by 2030 to prevent additional displacement.

The areas around Union Square and East Somerville stations were expected to have the highest rent increases – up to 67% in some instances. The US2 mixed-use development in Union Square, which replaced light industrial buildings, was intended as an anti-gentrification measure by increasing housing supply and subsidizing nearby households and businesses at risk of displacement. By late 2014, both residential and commercial rents were rising more than typical in Union Square.

Title VI analysis conducted in May 2021 indicated that the project would result in "disparate benefit to nonminority populations and a disproportionate benefit to non-low-income populations" – primarily due to demographic changes in the project area since planning began – though both protected populations would see an overall increase in service. The MBTA Board voted to address the disparity by retaining service on the route 80 bus (which had been planned for discontinuance when the GLX opened) and as part of an ongoing bus network redesign. By 2021, home sale prices in Somerville had increased by 40% since 2016. Somerville was formerly popular with artists due to lower prices than Boston and Cambridge, but artists reported in 2021 that affordable studio space was largely nonexistent, in part due to GLX-related gentrification.
