= Ball Square =

Neighborhood in Somerville, Massachusetts

Coordinates: 42°23′59″N 71°6′42″W

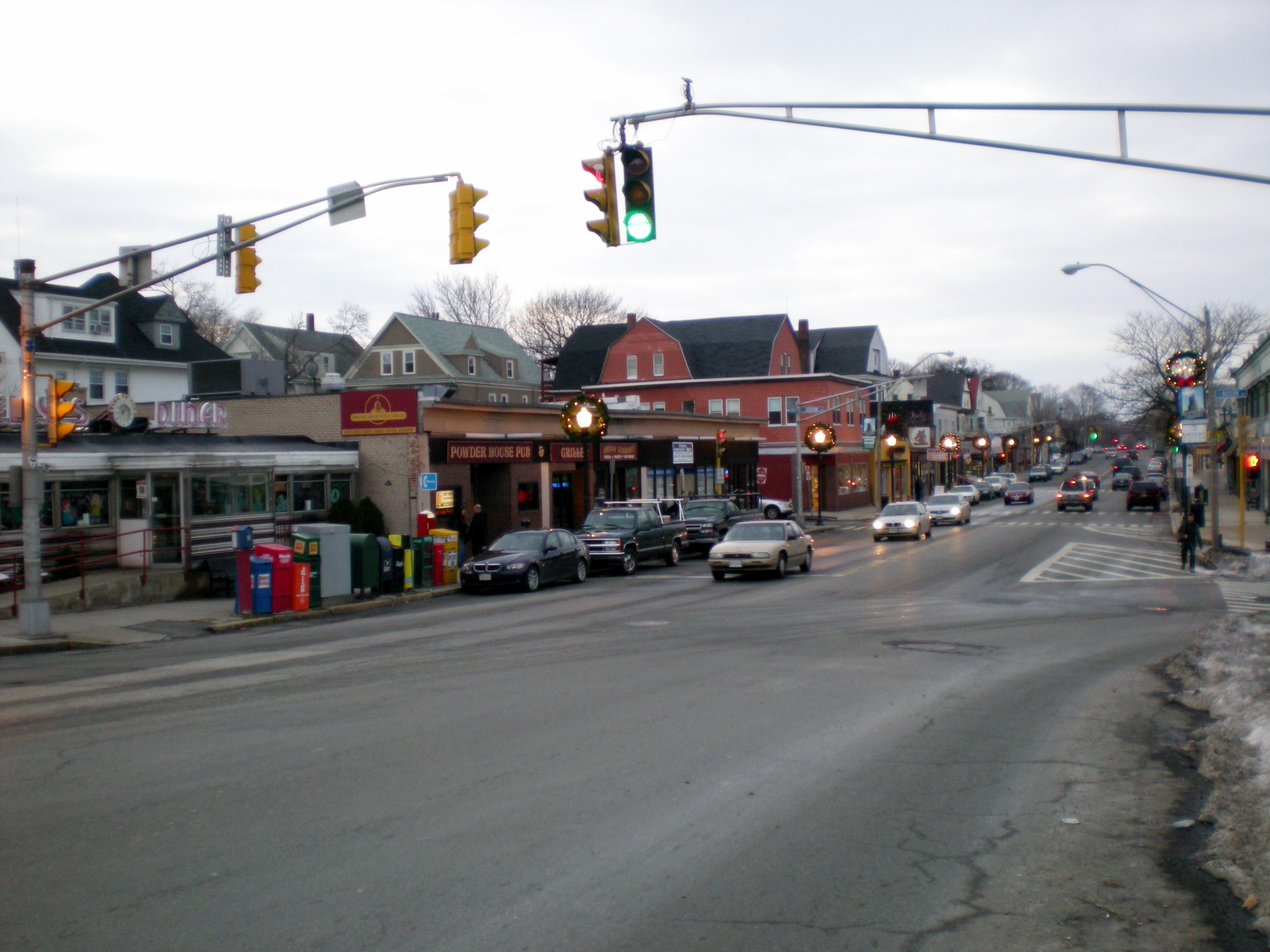
A view of Ball Square, looking north up Broadway from the corner of Boston Avenue.

Ball Square is a neighborhood primarily in Somerville, Massachusetts, United States, but also extending into Medford, at the intersection of Boston Avenue and Broadway, located between Powder House Square and Magoun Square. It is primarily a residential area with a handful of shops and restaurants along Broadway. Located on the edge of the neighborhood surrounding Tufts University, Ball Square contains a mix of businesses serving the student and academic populations as well as those reflecting the more blue-collar neighborhoods to the east.

The Brown School, opened in 1900, is located on Willow Avenue and serves the neighborhood's children from kindergarten to fifth grade. It is the only K-5 school in the Somerville School District.

Ball Square station on the MBTA Green Line is located adjacent to the square.

== History ==
Ball Square was named for John Nichols Ball (1835–1901). Following in the path of his uncle, Ball opened an insole factory in 1883 at 686 Broadway, between Josephine and Rogers Avenues. A respected businessman, Ball took up politics in 1895. That year, he began his term as a member of Somerville's Common Council. In 1897, Ball was elected to the Somerville Board of Aldermen and by the next year served as board president. Ball was discussed as a potential Republican candidate for mayor. Instead, he chose to enter state politics, running successfully as Representative for the 7th Middlesex District in 1900. Ball was well liked enough in his first term that he was reelected to the House in 1901. His burgeoning political career was cut short, however, by his death that October at age 66.

Ball Square was formerly the site of the storied Willow Jazz Club. In the 1990s, a fire destroyed several commercial businesses on Broadway, and as those businesses were replaced, an economic transformation began that continues today, with long-time businesses such as Lyndell's Bakery, which dates to the 19th century, along the same stretch as newcomers.

The Medford Branch of the Green Line Extension opened on December 12, 2022, with Ball Square station one of five new stations.
