= John Shea (playwright) =

American playwright (born 1964)

John Shea (born February 10, 1964, in Somerville, Massachusetts) is an American playwright. Most of his plays are set in his hometown of Somerville, an old industrial suburb of Boston which has gentrified rapidly in the early 21st century. His one-man show, "JUNKIE," produced by Argos Productions, was nominated for an Independent Reviewers of New England (IRNE) award.

Shea's work often depicts down-and-out characters struggling with addiction, alcoholism and the legacy of their Catholic upbringing. Others tackle subjects like racism, child molestation and homosexuality in the Catholic church.

Between 2005 and 2007, he was a Huntington Theatre Company Playwriting Fellow. His work has been produced at the National Playwright's Conference at the Eugene O'Neil Theatre Center, Boston University's New Play Initiative, the Tristan Bates Theatre Company in London, Boston Playwright's Theatre and the Huntington Theatre Company's Breaking Ground Festival.

Shea attended the playwrighting program at Boston University. He lives in the Magoun Square neighborhood of Somerville.

== Creative works ==
- Comp', produced by the Boston Playwrights' Theatre.
- Erin Go-Bragh-less
- The Hill
- Claire Silva
- Junkie
- Faces of the Dead
- The Painter
- Aberdeen
