= Adams-Magoun House =

Historic house in Massachusetts, United States

- U.S. National Register of Historic Places
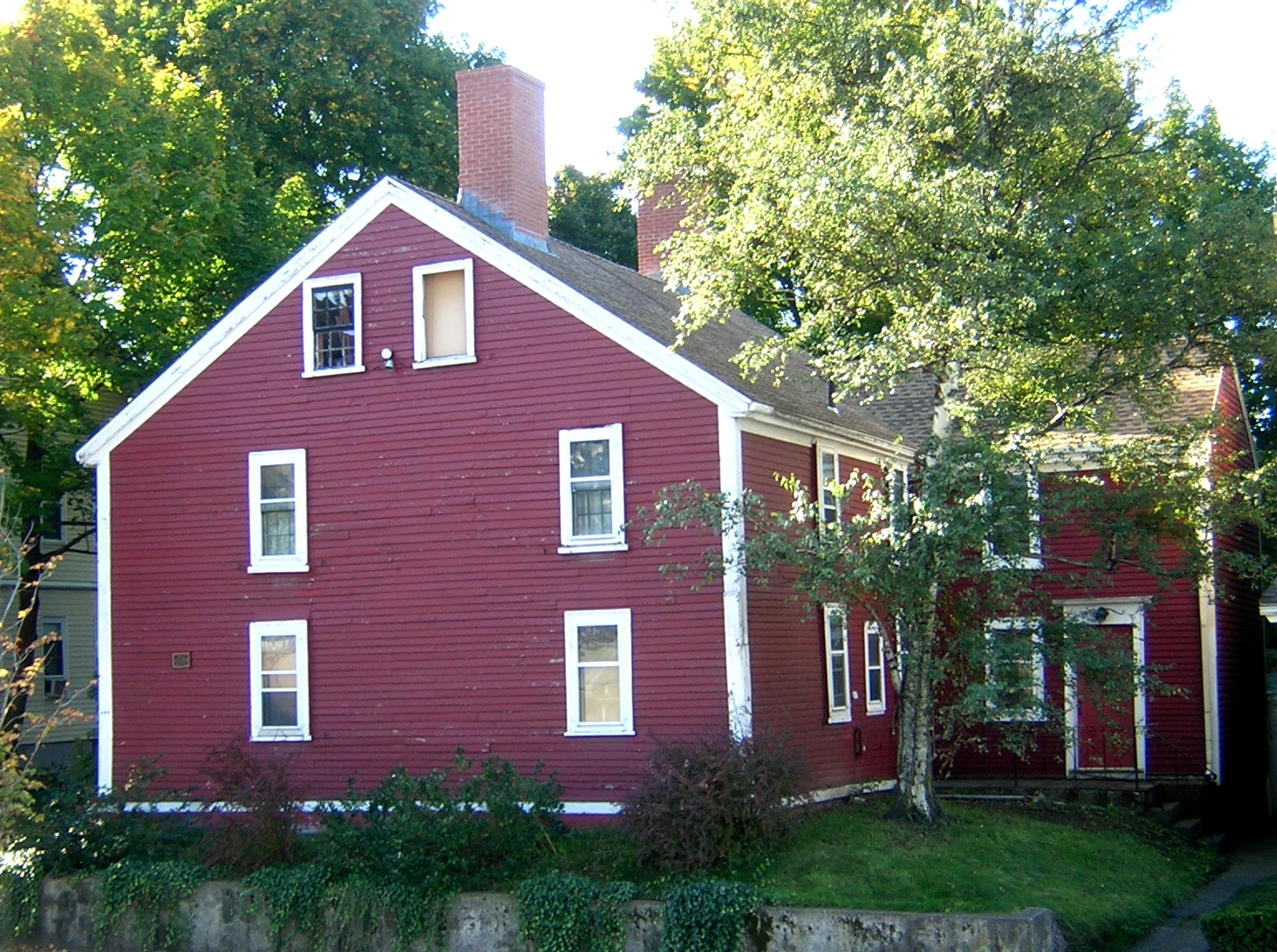

- Location within Massachusetts Location within the United States
- Location: 438 Broadway, Somerville, Massachusetts
- Coordinates: 42°23′45.8736″N 71°6′3.348″W
- Area: less than one acre
- Built: 1783
- Architectural style: Federal
- MPS: Somerville MPS
- NRHP reference No.: 89001239
- Added to NRHP: September 18, 1989

The Adams-Magoun House is a historic house at 438 Broadway in Somerville, Massachusetts. Built about 1783, it is one of the city's few surviving 18th-century buildings and its best-preserved. It was listed on the National Register of Historic Places in 1989.

== Description and history ==
The Adams-Magoun House stands on Winter Hill in central Somerville, roughly midway between Magoun Square and the Winter Hill commercial district. It is set facing east on the south side of Broadway, between Bartlett Street and Glenwood Road. It is a 2½-story wood-frame structure, with a gabled roof, two interior chimneys, and a clapboarded exterior. The main facade is five bays wide, with its entrance at the center, framed by pilasters and topped by a half-round transom window and gabled pediment. The interior follows a typical center hall plan, and has retained a number of original features, including particularly ornate turned balusters on the main staircase.

The house was built by Joseph Adams in 1783, and was the farmstead house for a farm of 71 acres (29 ha). It is one of a handful of 18th-century houses in Somerville, and its main entry transom window is believed to be one of the oldest of its type in the Boston area. Adams was married to Sarah Tufts, whose extended family owned large tracts of land in the town, including the tracts which eventually became Tufts University. She was the daughter of Peter and Anne Tufts. Their daughter, Sarah Ann Adams, married John C. Magoun (1797–1882), for whom Magoun Square is named. Magoun was a local assessor, served on the school committee as an overseer of the poor, and was a captain in the militia. At the time of Adams' marriage to Magoun, the farm extended from Broadway to the Boston and Maine Railroad, between Central and Lowell streets.

== See also ==
- National Register of Historic Places listings in Somerville, Massachusetts
