= Magoun Square =

Neighborhood in Medford and Somerville, Massachusetts

- Neighborhood
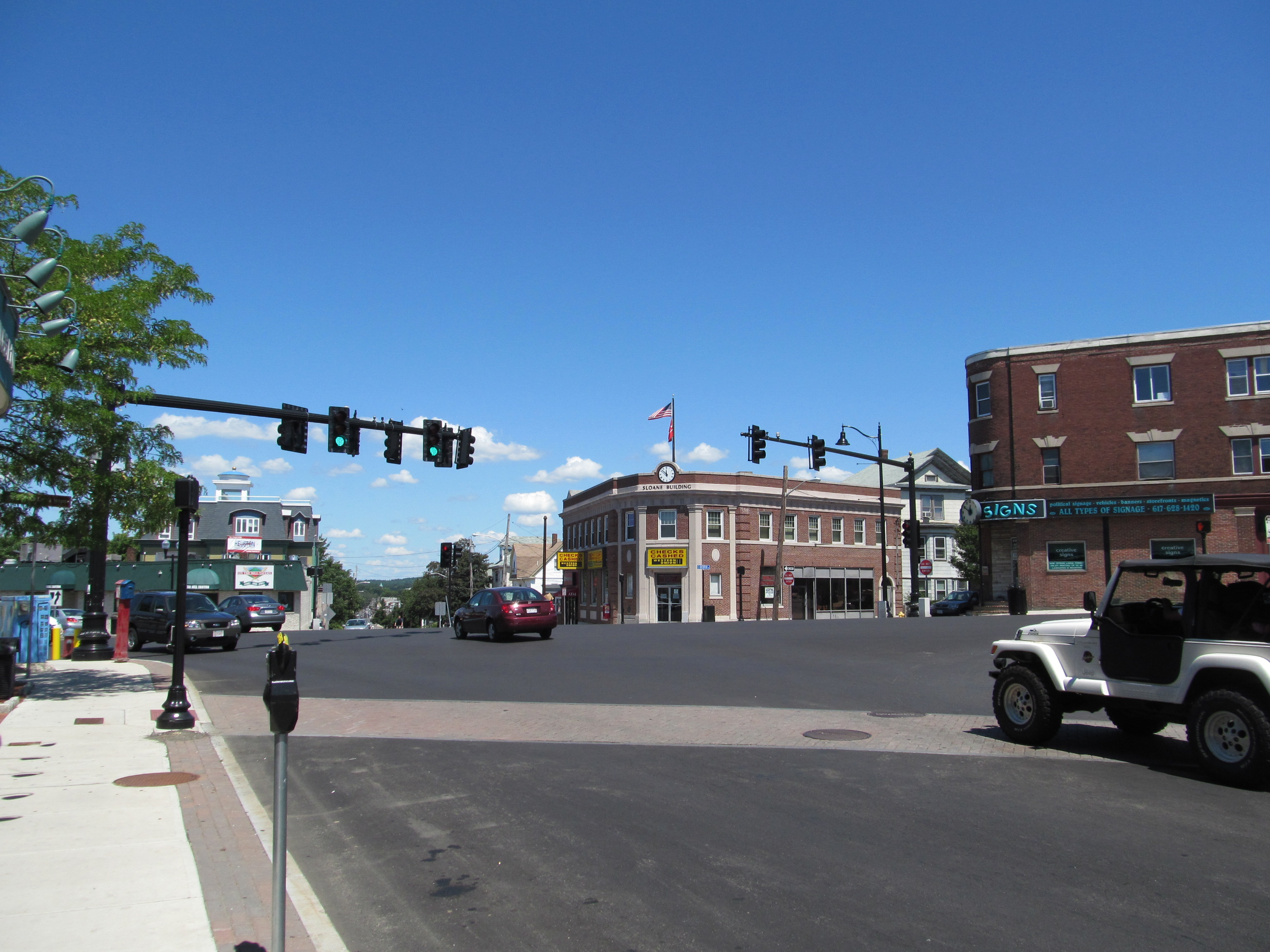
- Magoun Square in July 2012
- Interactive map of Magoun Square
- Coordinates: 42.397361°N 71.104395°W
- Country: United States
- State: Massachusetts
- City: Somerville

Magoun Square is a neighborhood centered on the intersection of Broadway and Medford Streets on the border of Medford and Somerville, Massachusetts, United States. It is located between the neighborhoods of Ball Square and Winter Hill. It is a mixed-use urban business district, with commercial sites in the square and residential areas surrounding it. Trum Field, a park featuring baseball diamonds and basketball courts, is near Magoun Square, as is the headquarters of the Somerville Department of Public Works. Notable residents include playwright John Shea.

== History ==
Magoun Square was named after the family of John Calvin Magoun (1797–1882). Magoun was an assessor for the town of Somerville, served on the school committee as an overseer of the poor, and was a captain in the militia. His family owned a farm between Broadway and Vernon Streets and lived in the Adams-Magoun House, built circa 1783.

== Transportation ==
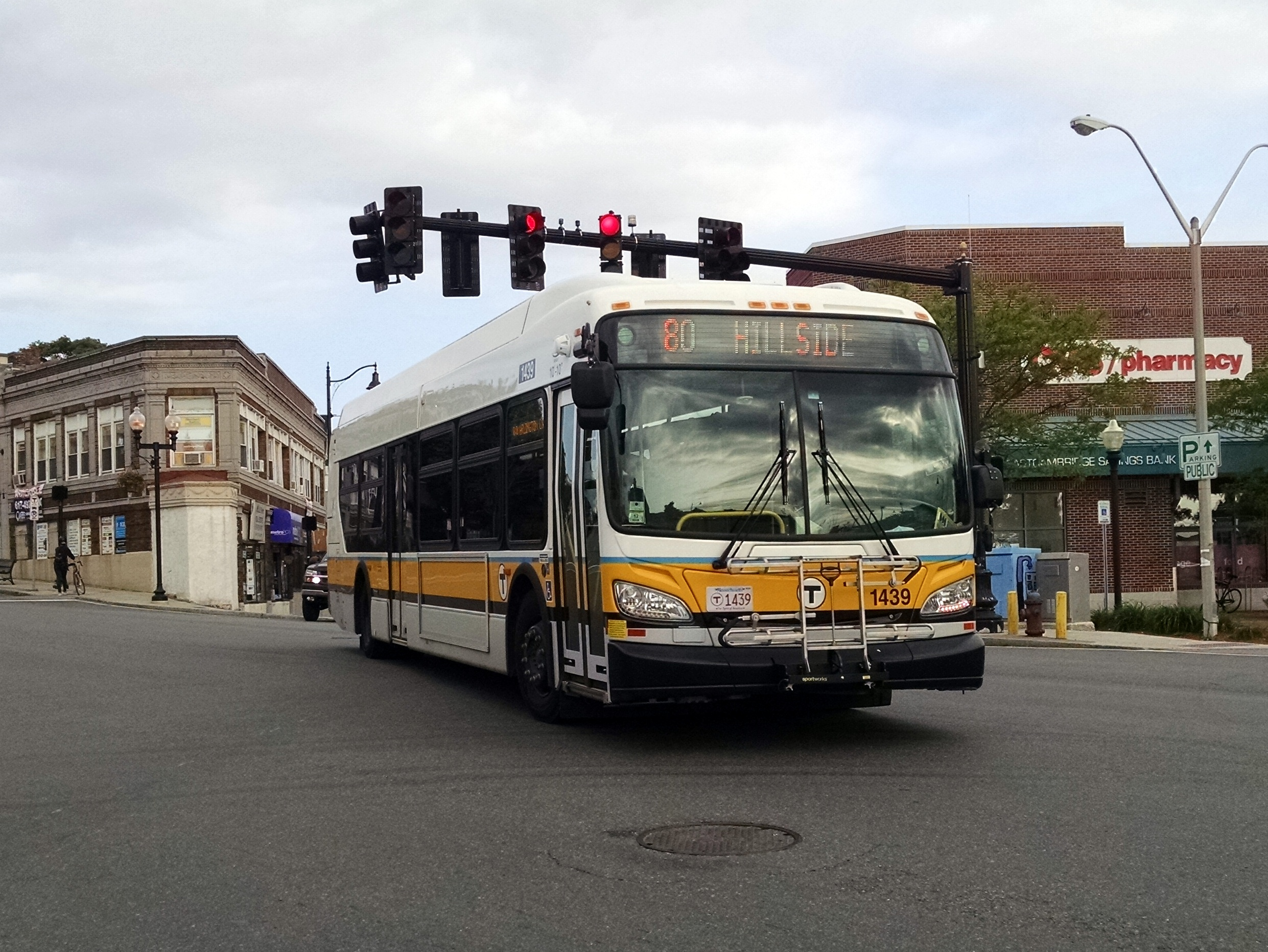
A route 80 bus in Magoun Square

Magoun Square is located at the intersection of Broadway and Medford Streets, two major thoroughfares. The square is a six-way intersection, with signals for Dexter Street and a municipal parking lot as well as the two major through streets. Lowell Street meets Medford Street just south of the square at a separate light. In 2009, the city requested and received $3 million in stimulus funding to improve the safety and accessibility of the crash-prone intersection. The project, which totaled $3.1 million in work, included new traffic signals, raised pedestrian islands and accessible curb cuts, bicycle racks, improved sidewalks, and street furniture. The project was initially completed in 2011, though some work had to be redone in 2012.

Magoun Square station on the MBTA Green Line is located on Lowell Street 0.3 miles (0.5 km) south of the actual square, while Ball Square station is located in Ball Square 0.4 miles (0.6 km) west of Magoun Square. MBTA bus routes 80 and 89 run through the square, while route 101 follows Main Street 400 feet (120 m) to the northeast.
