= Lechmere station =

Light rail station in Cambridge, Massachusetts, US

Lechmere
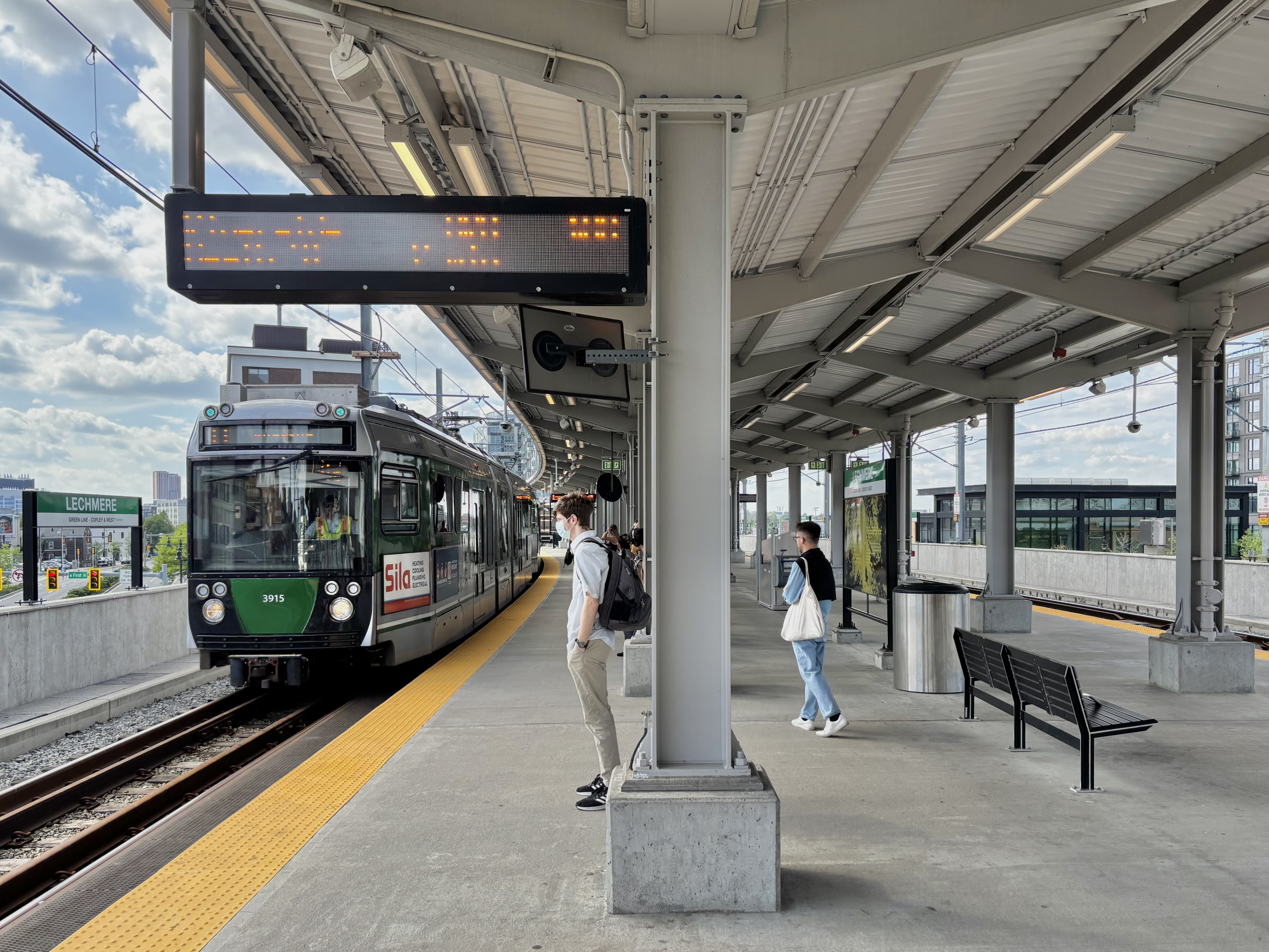
- A southbound train arriving at Lechmere station in May 2025

General information
- Location: 3 North First Street; East Cambridge, Cambridge, Massachusetts
- Coordinates: 42.37125°N 71.07610°W
- Platforms: 1 island platform
- Tracks: 2
- Connections: MBTA bus: 69, 80, 87, 88; EZRide

Construction
- Cycle facilities: 254 spaces
- Accessible: Yes

History
- Opened: July 10, 1922
- Rebuilt: May 24, 2020–March 21, 2022

Passengers
- FY2019: 5,697 boardings (weekday average)

Services
Preceding station	MBTA	Following station
Union Square Terminus	Green Line D branch	Science Park toward Riverside
East Somerville toward Medford/Tufts	Green Line E branch	Science Park toward Heath Street
Former services
Preceding station	MBTA	Following station
Terminus	Green Line B branch Cut back in 1980	Science Park toward Boston College
Terminus	Green Line C branch Cut back in 1981	Science Park toward Cleveland Circle
Union Square Terminus	Green Line E branch March–August 2022	Science Park toward Heath Street
Location

Lechmere station (/ˈliːtʃmɪr/ LEECH-meer) is a Massachusetts Bay Transportation Authority (MBTA) Green Line light rail station in Lechmere Square in East Cambridge, Massachusetts. It is located on the east side of Monsignor O'Brien Highway near First Street, adjacent to the NorthPoint development. The accessible elevated station has a single island platform, with headhouses at both ends. It opened on March 21, 2022, as part of the Green Line Extension (GLX). Lechmere station is served by Green Line D branch and E branch service.

The first transit in East Cambridge was a station on the Boston and Lowell Railroad, which served the neighborhood from the mid-19th century to 1927. Horsecar service through Lechmere Square began around 1861, using the Craigie Bridge to reach Boston, and was electrified in the 1890s. The Lechmere Viaduct was opened in 1912 with an incline to Lechmere Square, allowing streetcars from lines on Cambridge Street and Bridge Street to reach the Tremont Street subway.

In 1922, the Boston Elevated Railway opened a prepayment transfer station at Lechmere, separating the surface streetcars from the subway routes. This surface station had a loop for subway cars, with cross-platform transfers to the surface routes, and a small yard inside the loop. The surface streetcars were replaced by trolleybuses and later diesel buses in the 1930s to 1960s, while the subway routes became the Green Line in 1965.

Lechmere was the northern terminus of subway service for a century. Extensions northwest from Lechmere station were proposed in the 1920s, though planning did not begin until the early 21st century. A new elevated Lechmere station was to be built as part of the NorthPoint development, but it was instead added to GLX planning in 2007. The MBTA agreed in 2012 to open the station by 2017, and a construction contract was awarded in 2013. Cost increases triggered a wholesale reevaluation of the GLX project in 2015. A scaled-down station design was released in 2016, with a design and construction contract issued in 2017. The surface station was closed on May 24, 2020, for Green Line Extension construction; the busways at the old station remained open as a transfer point between MBTA bus routes and Lechmere–North Station shuttle buses until the new station opened.

== Station design ==
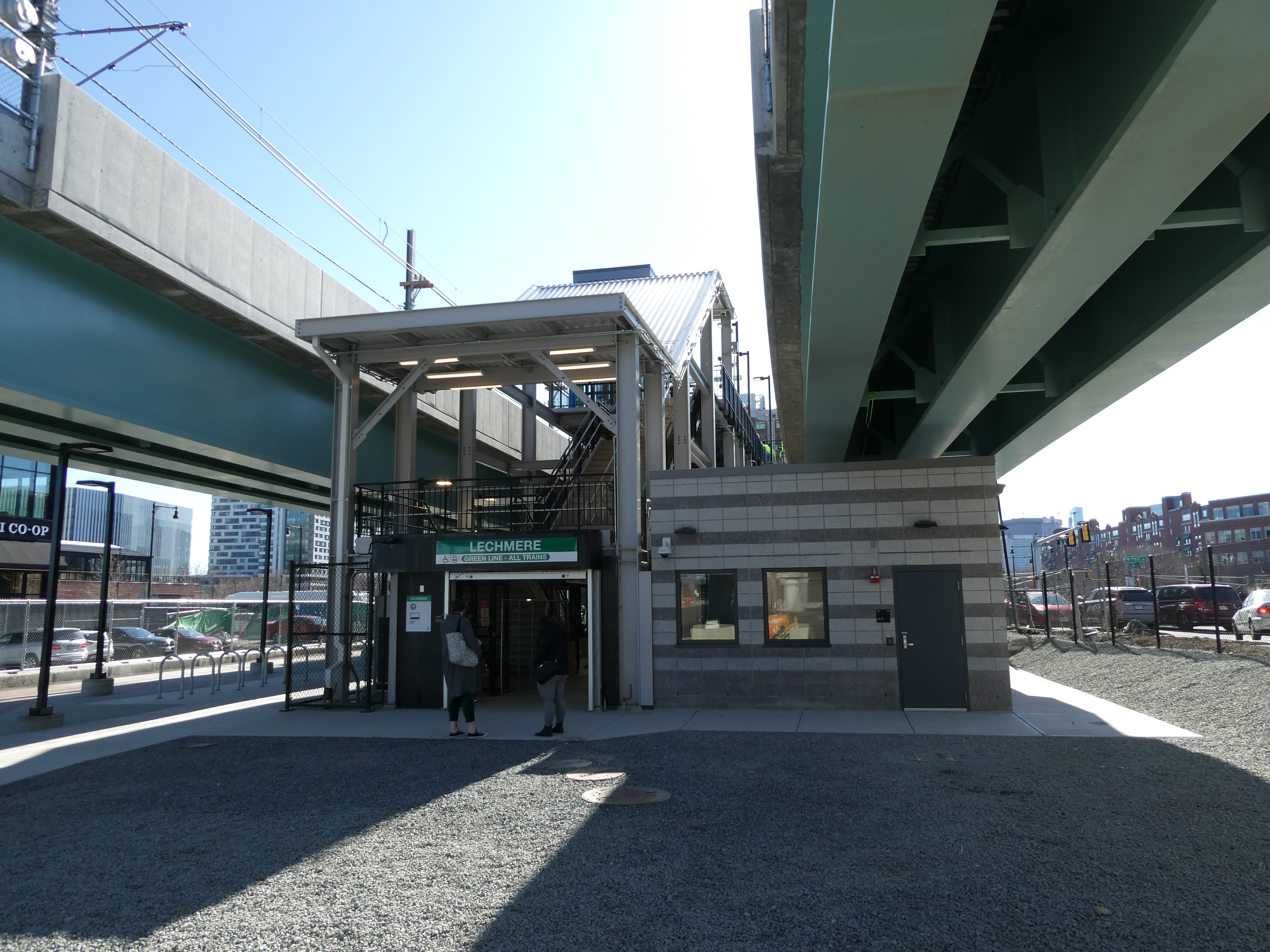
The north headhouse in March 2022

Lechmere station is located on the east side of O'Brien Highway at Lechmere Square, adjacent to the North Point development. The two-track Green Line viaduct runs approximately southeast–northwest through the station area. The station has a single curved island platform, 355 feet (108 m) long and 32–35 feet (9.8–10.7 m) wide, located over the block between East Street and North First Street.

The platform is 8 inches (200 mm) high for accessible boarding on current light rail vehicles (LRVs) and can be raised to 14 inches (360 mm) for level boarding with Type 9 and future Type 10 LRVs. While the other GLX stations have 225-foot (69 m)-long platforms with provisions for extension, the platform at Lechmere was built to its maximum length because it would be more difficult to extend in the future. A canopy covers the full length of the platform; it is two spans wide, rather than the single span used on the narrower platforms at the other GLX stations.

Headhouses are located north of North First Street and south of East Street. The north headhouse has two elevators and stairs to the platform; the south headhouse has one elevator and stairs. A bus loop for MBTA bus routes 69, 80, 87, and 88 is located off Water Street north of the north headhouse. A bike station between the headhouses has space for 182 bicycles; racks for 72 additional bicycles are located next to the north headhouse. Public artwork at the station includes Field Notes by Randall Thurston – a set of panels on the elevator shafts depicting birds and vines. Some panels on station signs have artwork of poetry overlaid with images of birds; others have historical images and interpretive text.

== History ==
=== East Cambridge station ===
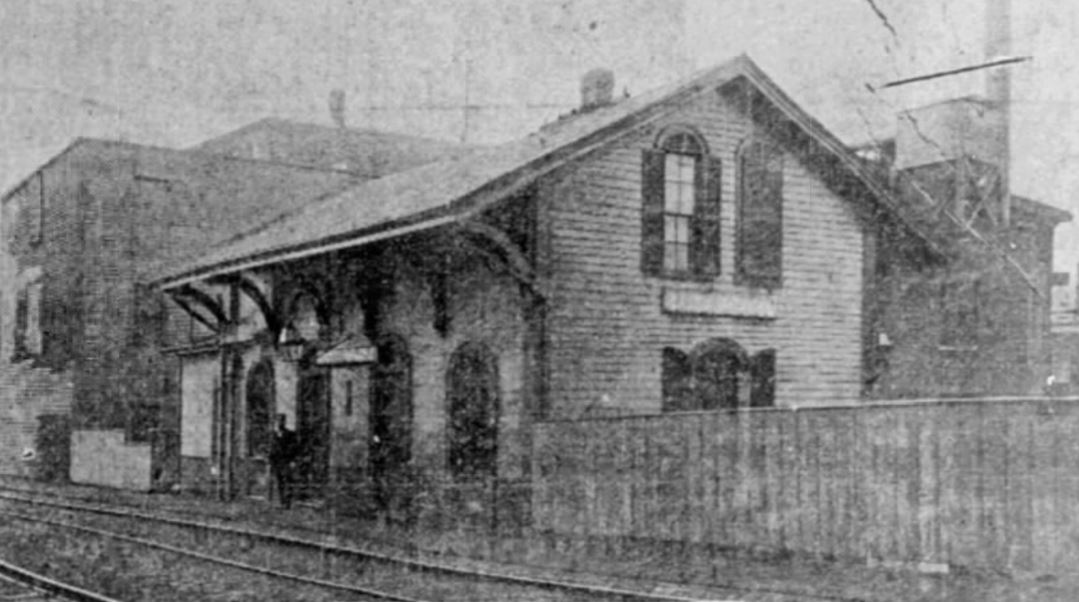
East Cambridge station in 1905

The Boston and Lowell Railroad (B&L) opened between its namesake cities in 1835. Passenger service initially ran express between the two cities, but local stops were soon added. One of the first was East Cambridge (Note: Also originally called East Cambridge Gates. "Gates", which was a suffix for several B&L stations, denoted the crossing gates at the grade crossing of the Prison Point Bridge.) which was located near the Prison Point Bridge by 1846. By 1865, it was moved north to the foot of Third Street, closer to development on Dog Island (East Cambridge). The station was popular with employees from Somerville commuting to the factories of East Cambridge; among its more famous users was Benjamin Butler. In 1870, the Lexington Branch was routed over the B&L east of Somerville Junction, increasing service to Somerville Junction, Winter Hill, Milk Row, and East Cambridge stations. The Central Massachusetts Railroad began operations in 1881 with the Lexington Branch and B&L as its Boston entry. The Fitchburg Railroad also had an East Cambridge station (primarily served by Lexington Branch trains) located at Linwood Street, just over the Somerville border, in the mid-19th century.

In 1926, the Boston and Maine Railroad (B&M), which had acquired the B&L in 1887, began work on North Station plus an expansion of its freight yards. The B&M proposed to abandon East Cambridge station in order to realign the ex-B&L into the new station. Although most inner stations were largely replaced by streetcars and automobiles at this time, East Cambridge was still used by both industrial workers and by those headed to the Middlesex County Courthouse, and the proposed closure was locally opposed. The Public Utilities Commission approved the closure of East Cambridge and nearby Prospect Hill in March 1927; one train was rescheduled for ten minutes earlier to accommodate court attendees. The stations closed at some point between then and May 17, when trains were rerouted over the new alignment. The former alignment remained in use for freight for decades thereafter. A portion of the abandoned embankment near the former station location dates from between 1855 and 1868.

=== Surface station ===
==== Early streetcar service ====
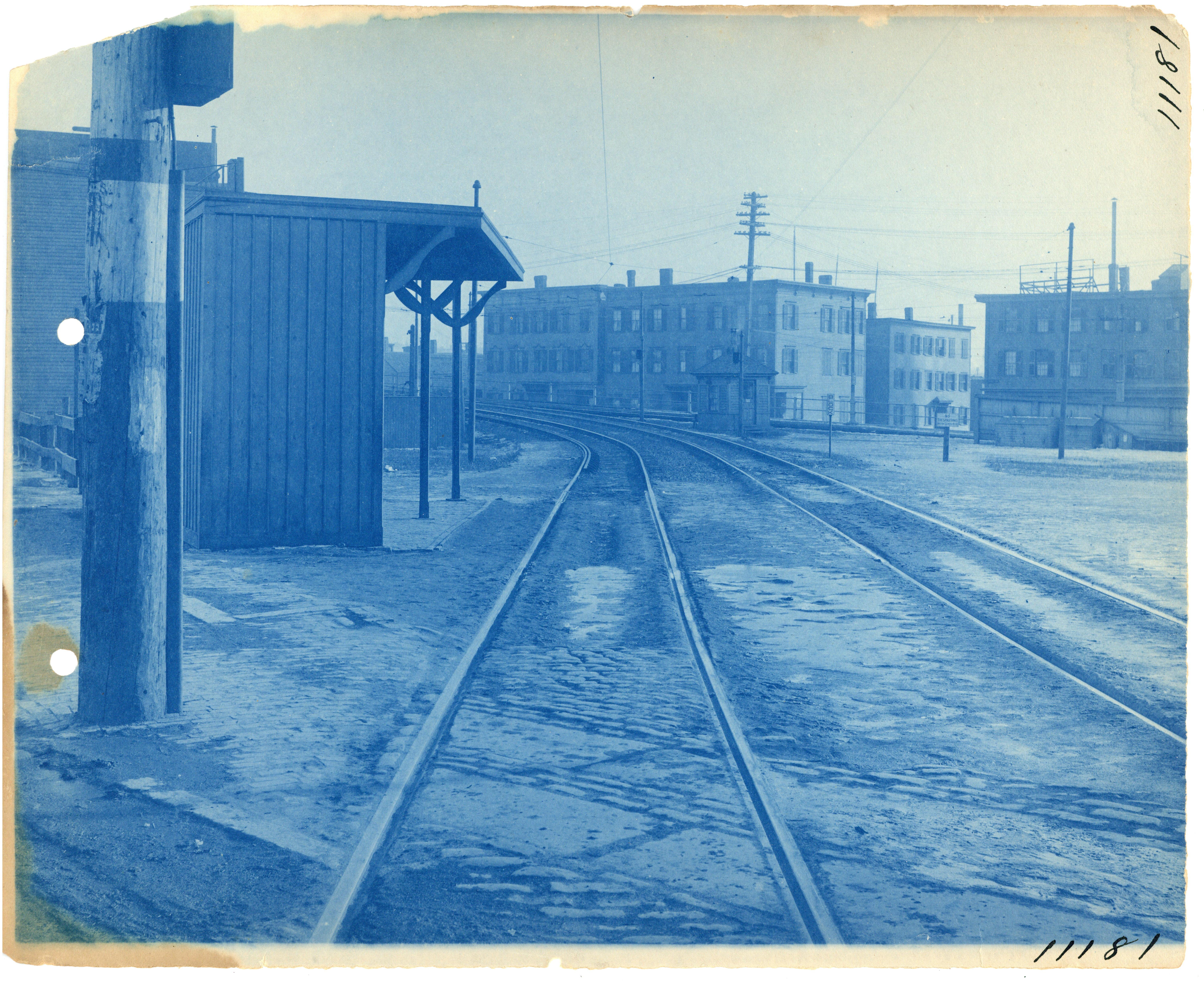
Shelter for outbound Bridge Street streetcars at Lechmere Square in 1915

The Cambridge Railroad was granted permission in 1860 to run horsecar tracks over the Craigie Bridge from East Cambridge to Boston. Service began from Harvard Square along Cambridge Street to Lechmere Square around 1861, and from Lechmere Square over the bridge into Boston by 1862. In 1864, the company built a line from Union Square in Somerville along Somerville Avenue and Bridge Street to the existing tracks at Lechmere Square, allowing through service from Elm Street (now Davis Square) to Boston. The Cambridge Street line was converted to electric streetcar service by Cambridge Railroad successor West End Street Railway in 1891; the Somerville Avenue line and an 1888-built line to Davis Square via Highland Avenue were electrified and extended to Clarendon Hill in 1893–1895.

The West End was leased to the Boston Elevated Railway (BERy) in 1897. The three streetcar lines running through Lechmere Square began running into the Tremont Street subway via the Canal Street incline upon its September 3, 1898, opening. The trip from Lechmere Point over the bridge was slow and prone to delays, causing congestion in the subway. Construction of the Lechmere Viaduct and Causeway Street Elevated began in 1907 to provide the streetcar routes a more direct route into the subway. The BERy considered building a station at Lechmere Square at the north end of the viaduct but rejected the idea in 1911. The viaduct opened on June 1, 1912, though some local streetcar lines continued to use the Charles River Dam Bridge. The incline at the north end of the viaduct, which connected to the surface streetcar tracks, occupied half the block between Lechmere Square and Second Street.

==== Lechmere station ====
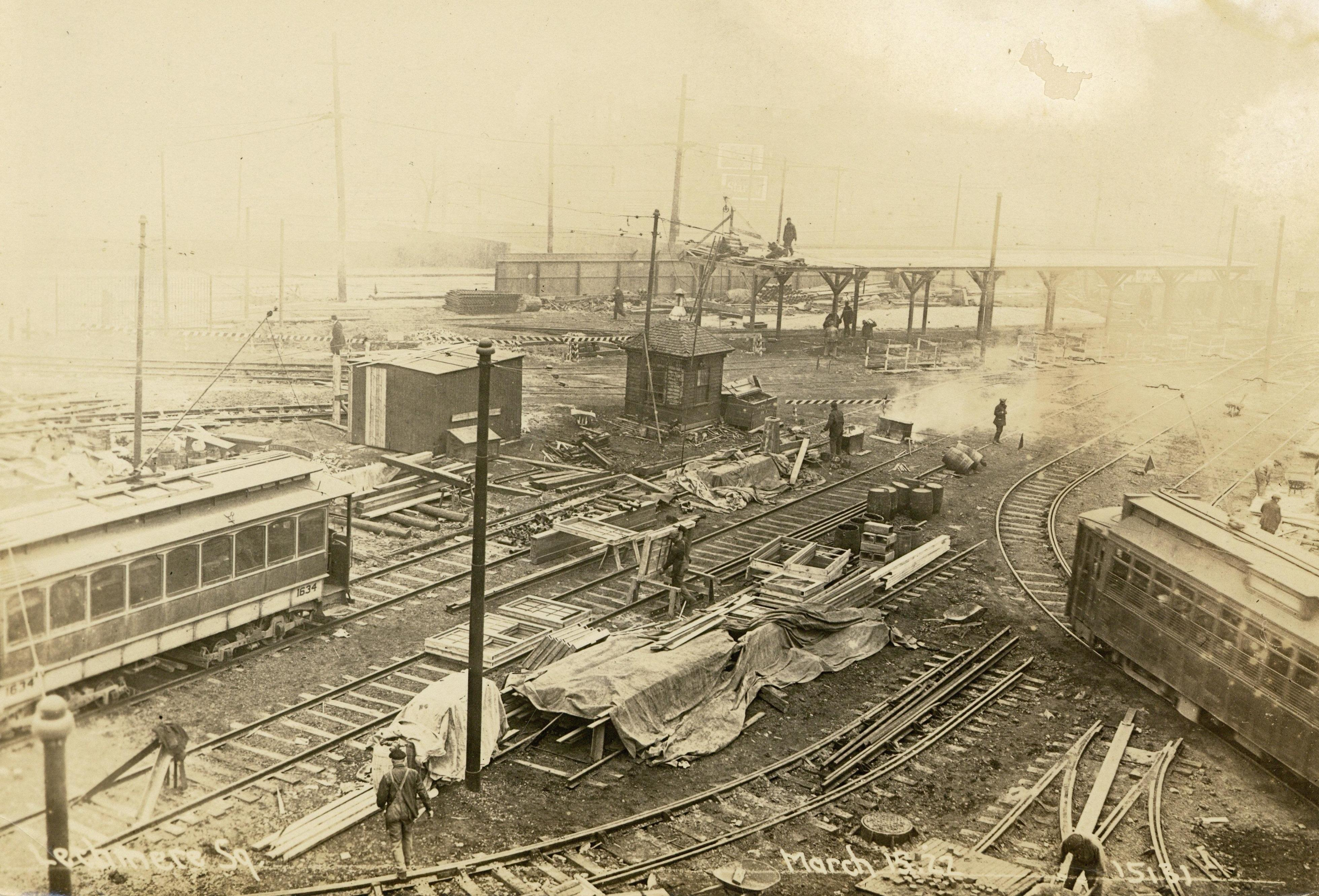
The station under construction in March 1922

Although it substantially reduced travel times between Lechmere and North Station, the Lechmere Viaduct and Causeway Street Elevated soon became insufficient for the service the BERy needed. Unlike the Commonwealth Avenue, Beacon Street, and Huntington Avenue lines, the Cambridge Street and Bridge Street lines did not have dedicated medians, so automobile traffic caused delays on the surface lines, which in turn propagated into the subway. Additional capacity in the subway was also needed – more than could be provided by small streetcars suitable for operation in mixed traffic.

In 1917, transit consultant John A. Beeler was hired by the Massachusetts Public Service Commission to analyze the struggling BERy. Among Beeler's recommendations was for the Tremont Street Subway to be converted to a third rail rapid transit service, with surface lines terminating at transfer stations (as had been done with the Main Line El and Cambridge–Dorchester line). He proposed that the northern transfer station be at Lechmere Square, with elevated rapid transit platforms and surface loops for streetcars.

In September 1921, the BERy applied to the Massachusetts Public Utilities Commission (PUC), successor to the Public Service Commission, for authority to build transfer stations at Lechmere Square and Braves Field. (Note: By 1922, the western terminal proposal had been relocated to Linden Street in Allston. It was never built due to public objection.) The Lechmere Square proposal included taking 73,000 square feet (6,800 m^{2}) of land by eminent domain. The city of Cambridge objected to the design, particularly the construction of a loop track on Third Street. The PUC approved the proposal in November 1921, but the city sought an injunction to prevent construction of the Third Street track. The Massachusetts Supreme Judicial Court upheld the BERy's position, allowing construction of the track, in May 1922 – by which time the construction of the rest of the terminal was already well underway.

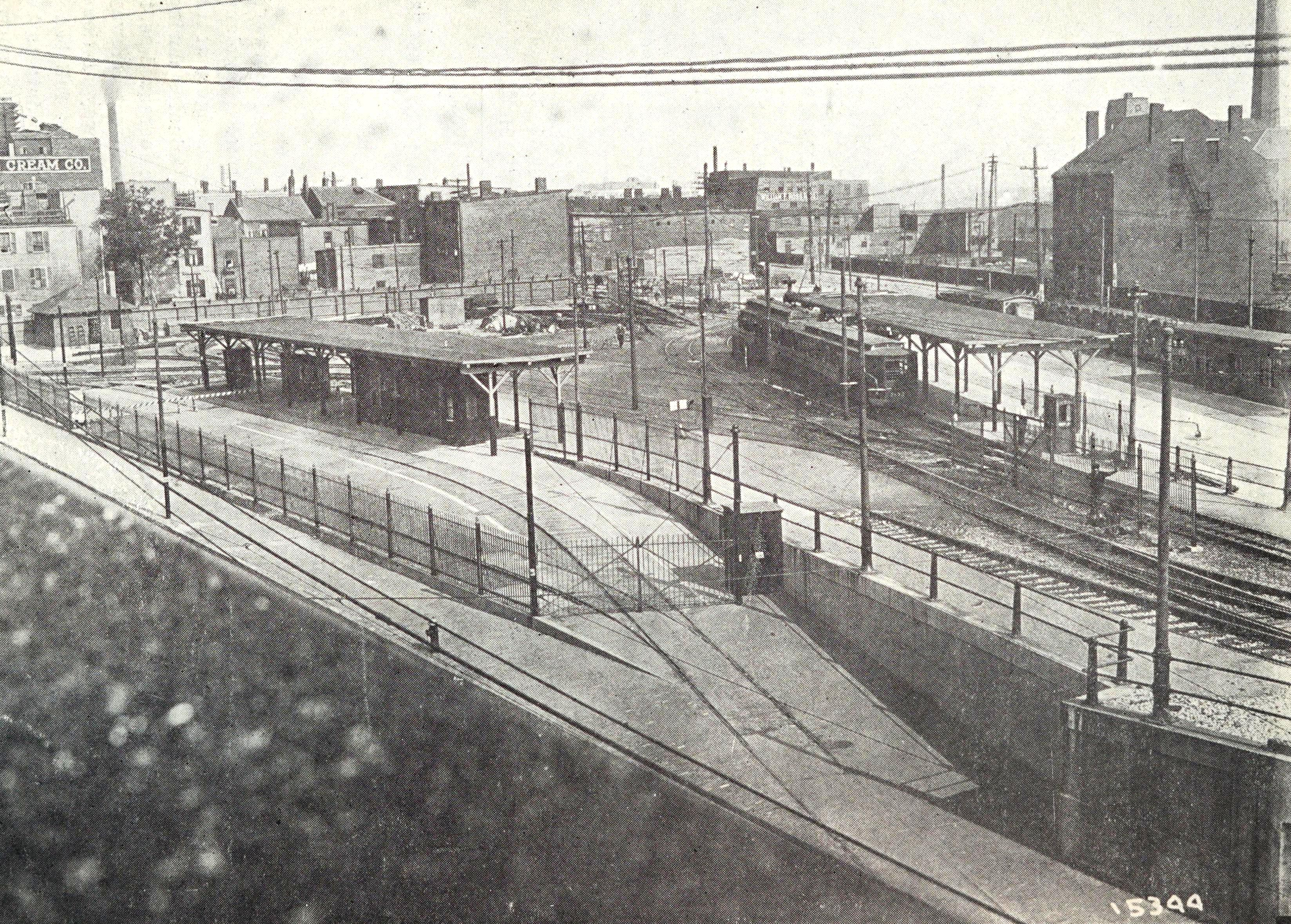
Lechmere station shortly before completion

The station occupied the triangular parcel bounded by Cambridge Street, Bridge Street, and Second Street. It had a balloon loop for subway trains (which were still made of streetcars, rather than true rapid transit cars), with cross-platform transfers between streetcars and subway trains. Terminating streetcars used a pair of tracks off Cambridge Street, with a covered platform for passengers to then wait for subway trains. Streetcars then looped under the viaduct at Lechmere Square and picked up passengers using two tracks off Bridge Street, where a waiting room was located on the platform. Harvard-bound streetcars ran on a single track on Gore Street and Third Street to reach Cambridge Street; streetcars arriving from Somerville used the same Third Street track to reach Lechmere station. A second loop and several storage tracks were located inside the main subway train loop. Unlike the Boston portion of the subway system, which was funded by the cities and built by contractors, Lechmere station was funded and built entirely by the BERy at a cost of $100,000 (equivalent to $1,500,000 in 2024).

Lechmere station opened on July 10, 1922. The new terminal was expected to be used by 24,000 passengers daily in each direction and to increase daily seated capacity through the subway by 8,754 passengers. Initial subway service to Lechmere was a shuttle service to Pleasant Street, which was intended as a temporary terminal until a more suitable western terminal could be found. Service ran with three-car trains every three minutes at peak and two-car trains every four minutes at other times. The forced transfer was unpopular with some riders who formerly had a one-seat ride to downtown Boston.

==== Modifications and service changes ====
On January 2, 1923, some off-peak trips were extended through the Boylston Street Subway to the surface station at Kenmore; all-day service began on October 10. Most trips were extended along the Beacon Street line to Washington Square on December 14, 1929. The Washington Street service was cut back to Kenmore in June 1930 but resumed that September. On February 7, 1931, all regular Commonwealth Avenue and Beacon Street service was extended from Park Street to Lechmere, and the existing shuttle services to Lechmere were replaced with Kenmore–Park Street shuttles.

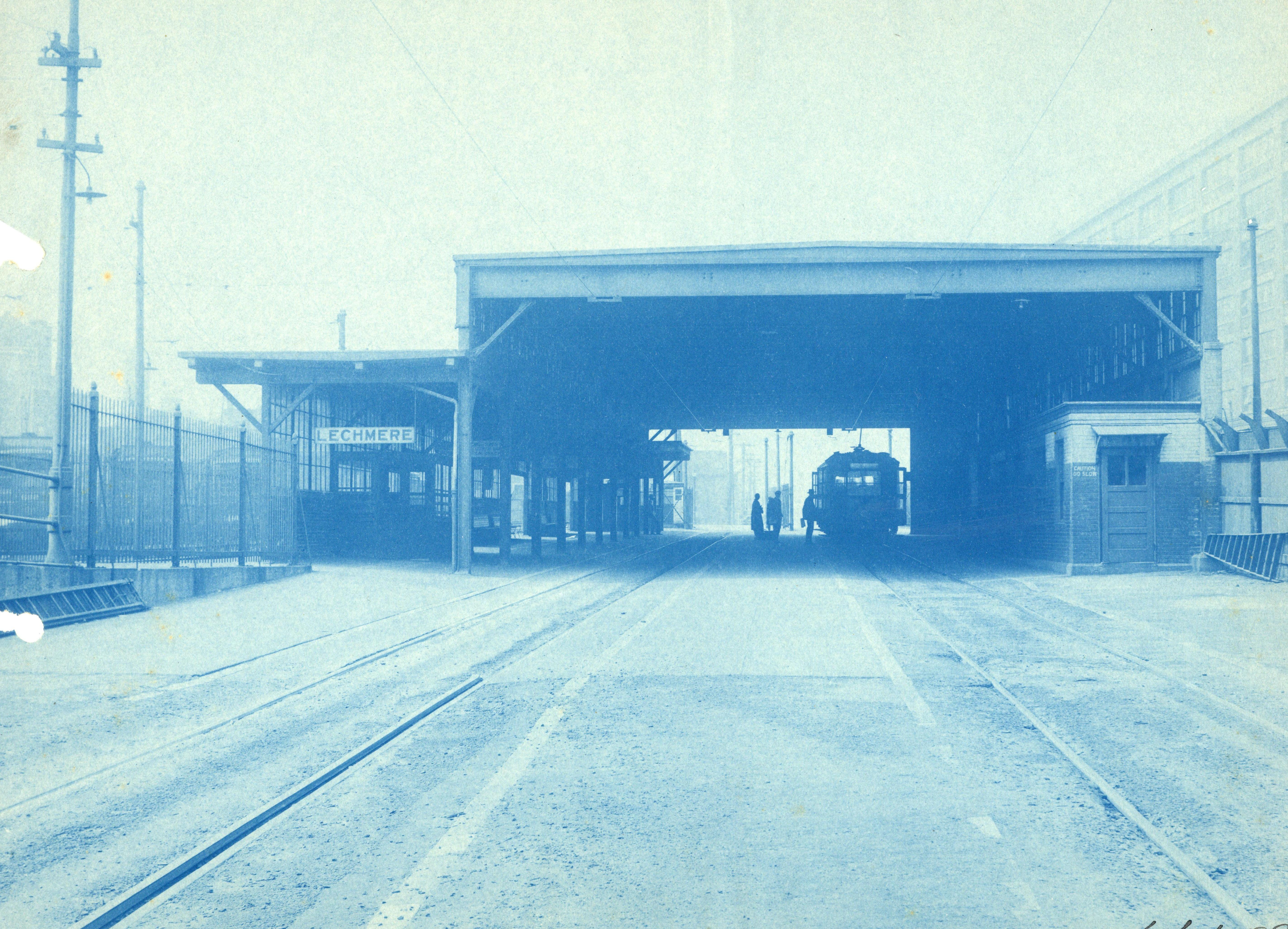
The outbound transfer canopy in 1927

In 1923, the BERy constructed a brick-and-steel canopy over the northbound (outbound) surface tracks. On October 18, 1924, a prepayment entrance was added to the north end of this shelter. This allowed passengers boarding streetcars (who had not come from the subway) to wait in the station rather than at the next stop. The final streetcars still using the Charles River Dam were night cars, which were routed onto the viaduct on July 26, 1924. Bridge Street was widened into the Northern Artery in 1928. The widening was on the south side of the street – except at Lechmere Square, where it was diverted to the north to avoid the streetcar shelter. A track on Bridge Street next to the station, not used for revenue service since the night car diversion in 1924, was kept in service to store extra streetcars during events at the new Boston Garden.

Bus service to Lechmere station began on May 9, 1932. (Note: A night bus route between Central Square and Scollay Square via Lechmere Square began on May 4, 1930. The route ran on Cambridge Street and did not enter Lechmere station.) The first route ran to Lafayette Square via Cambridge and Columbia streets, with a supplemental short turn route on Cambridge Street to Webster Street operated during peak hours. The outbound surface track used by Cambridge Street cars was rebuilt and set in concrete paving to accommodate buses. A Lechmere–Arlington Center bus route was established on July 9, 1932. The Central Square route and its short turn variant were discontinued on October 14, 1933. By that time, the Cambridge Street side of Lechmere station had also been paved, with one of the surface car tracks removed.

Track layout of the station in 1936

The Harvard–Lechmere streetcar line was converted to trackless trolley (trolleybus) on April 11, 1936 – the first route in what would become an extensive trackless trolley system. However, the tracks on Cambridge Street were kept for non-revenue use, as Commonwealth Avenue streetcars were stored at Bennett Street Carhouse. In 1937, part of the inbound shelter was bricked in as a waiting room. The remaining portion of the Charles River Dam tracks was removed in the late 1930s. Commonwealth Avenue line streetcars were transferred to the expanded Reservoir Carhouse on May 6, 1940, and the Cambridge Street tracks were abandoned. Most overnight storage of streetcars in the Lechmere yard also ended at that time, though it resumed from September 14, 1942, to late 1953.

In 1940–41, the BERy reassigned its public-facing route numbers. The Harvard–Lechmere route was designated as route 77 (later route 69), Arlington Center–Lechmere as route 80, and the Clarendon Hill–Lechmere routes as 87 (via Somerville Avenue) and 88 (via Highland Avenue). On September 3, 1941, the BERy began paving around the remaining surface car tracks at Lechmere station. This allowed for the conversion of routes 87 and 88 to trackless trolley on November 8, 1941. The surface tracks at Lechmere station were abandoned, leaving just the loop and yard tracks for subway service. The BERy opened a 325-space parking lot on the south side of Cambridge Street on April 23, 1941; it was enlarged to 358 spaces in 1950.

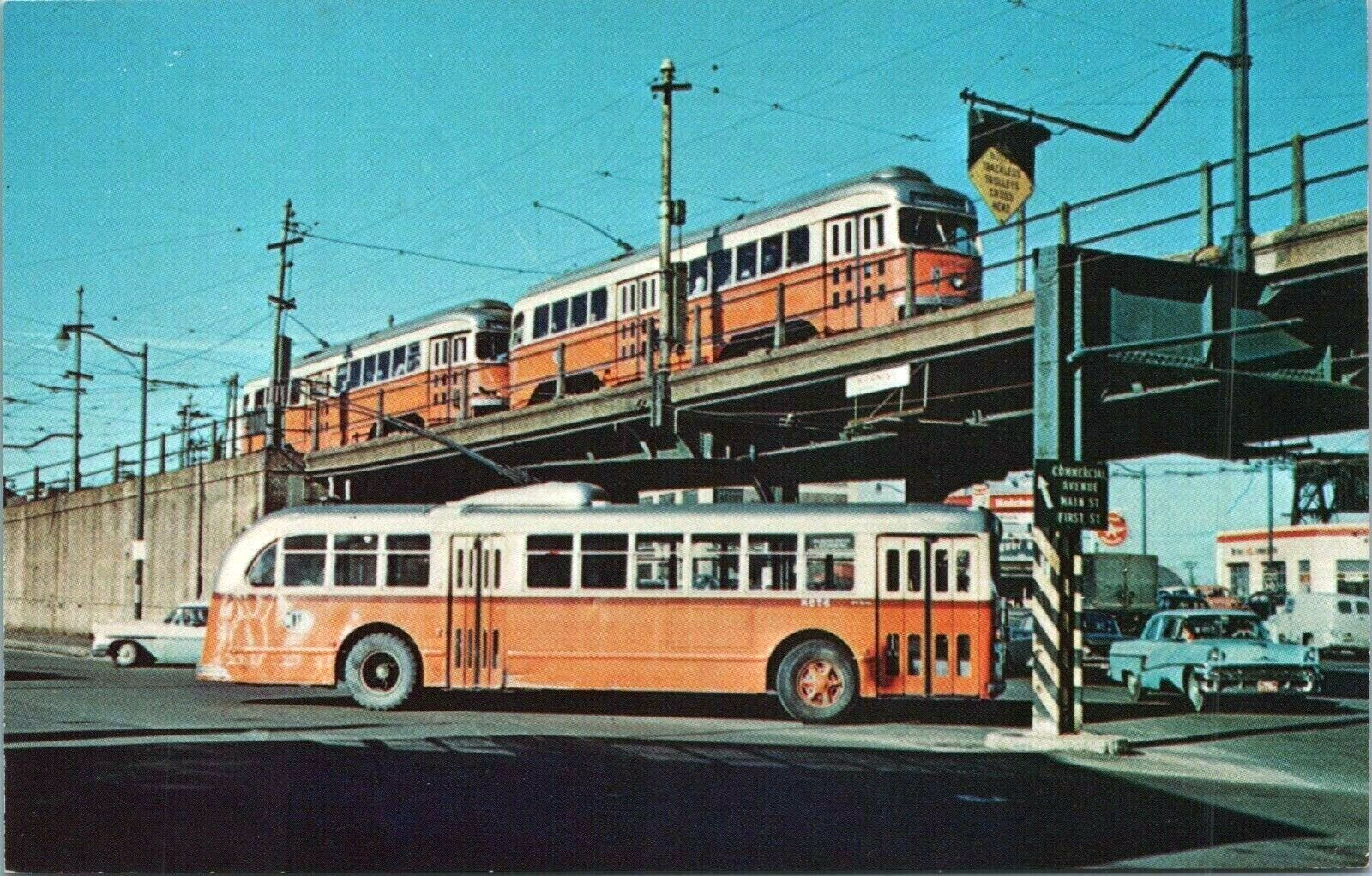
A trackless trolley loops under a subway train at Lechmere in 1960

The Metropolitan Transit Authority (MTA) replaced the BERy in 1947. Although MTA management generally favored buses over trackless trolley, bus route 80 was converted to trackless trolley on September 12, 1953. The MTA began charging for parking at its stations, including Lechmere, on November 2, 1953. Lechmere was the second-busiest lot on the system in 1956 with 92,637 annual users. On November 3, 1961, midday service to Lechmere was replaced with a Haymarket–Lechmere shuttle, with the Commonwealth Avenue and Beacon Street lines cut back to Park Street and North Station while the shuttle was running. The Riverside Line (opened in 1959) was extended from Park Street to Lechmere on November 25, 1961; the Commonwealth Avenue and Beacon Street lines were cut back at all times, while the shuttle was discontinued.

On May 25, 1962, the MTA abandoned non-revenue tracks that connected the Canal Street Inline with Everett Shops (the agency's heavy maintenance facility) and Charlestown Neck Carhouse (where many maintenance railcars were stored). A ramp was built inside Lechmere Yard so that streetcars could be loaded onto trucks for transfer to Everett. Some work cars were also stored in Lechmere Yard. Routes 77, 80, 87, and 88 were all converted from trackless trolley to diesel bus on March 31, 1963. In early 1964, the north end of the yard was paved. This allowed buses on routes 80, 87, and 88 to reach the inbound busway directly from Bridge Street, eliminating the jog on Third and Cambridge streets.

==== MBTA era ====
The Massachusetts Bay Transportation Authority (MBTA) replaced the MTA in August 1964. On August 26, 1965, the MBTA assigned color names to the rapid transit lines, with the Tremont Street Subway-based streetcar lines becoming the Green Line. The western branches were assigned letters A through E in 1967. The Commonwealth Avenue line became the B branch, the Beacon Street line the C branch, and the Riverside Line the D branch. After the 1964 opening of a loop at Government Center, which gave the MBTA four downtown terminals for Green Line branches, the MBTA more frequently switched which lines ran to which downtown terminals to match passenger demands and other operational needs. The C branch was extended to Lechmere on March 25, 1967, joining the D branch. On March 25, 1974, the B branch was extended back to Lechmere and the D branch cut to North Station; for the next decade, the B, C, and D branches frequently were switched between Lechmere and other termini.

The practice of routing inbound buses through Lechmere Yard was ended in the late 1970s, likely when the Boeing LRVs (which were larger and heavier than previous streetcars) began operating on the Green Line. Around 1980, a new parking lot was opened on the north side of Bridge Street to allow for redevelopment of the old lot. On January 2, 1983, for the first time in the station's history, trains from Huntington Avenue (the E branch) began serving Lechmere. They were extended from Park Street to Lechmere during rush hours and midday, with the D branch cut back to Government Center at those hours. On February 11, 1983, the E branch was shut down by snow for several days; a Government Center–Lechmere shuttle ran in its stead, joined by some D branch service on March 26.

On January 20, 1984, a fire destroyed the wooden approach trestles to the North Station drawbridges. A temporary terminal for the Fitchburg Line and Lowell Line (Note: The Ipswich/Rockport Line originally used this terminal as well. However, it switched to a platform at Sullivan Square station on the Orange Line on January 28 to ease congestion on the Green Line. The Merrimack Valley Line initially terminated at Malden Center, then at Oak Grove after February 15, and never used the temporary terminal.) – with a large tent erected next to the tracks as a waiting room – was set up just north of the bridges. (Note: The Lynch Family Skatepark now occupies this site.) Riders were bused between the temporary terminal and Lechmere station, with free fares for inbound passengers at Lechmere. All peak Lechmere service was operated as Government Center–Lechmere shuttles to handle the load. The shuttle buses ran directly to North Station beginning in March 1984; Green Line service was not modified. North Station reopened on April 20, 1985, again with no change to Green Line service.

Revenue equipment was stored in Lechmere Yard beginning in December 1984. The ramp, largely disused after heavy maintenance shops at Riverside opened in 1976, was removed in the late 1980s to make room for additional storage tracks. From December 28, 1985, to July 25, 1986, additional shuttle service ran between Lechmere and Kenmore. (This provided the first direct peak service between Lechmere and much of the subway since January 1984.) Most E branch service resumed to Lechmere on July 26, 1986. The remaining Lechmere–Government Center shuttles were replaced with an extension of D branch service to Lechmere on June 21, 1997. On June 25, 1995, the fare collection booth at Lechmere was closed except from 6:30 to 9:30 am on weekdays. At other times, passengers were required to use an automated token machine and pay on board trains. Around 2000, portable lifts were added at Lechmere as a temporary accessibility measure, along with a wooden mini-high platform on the inbound side.

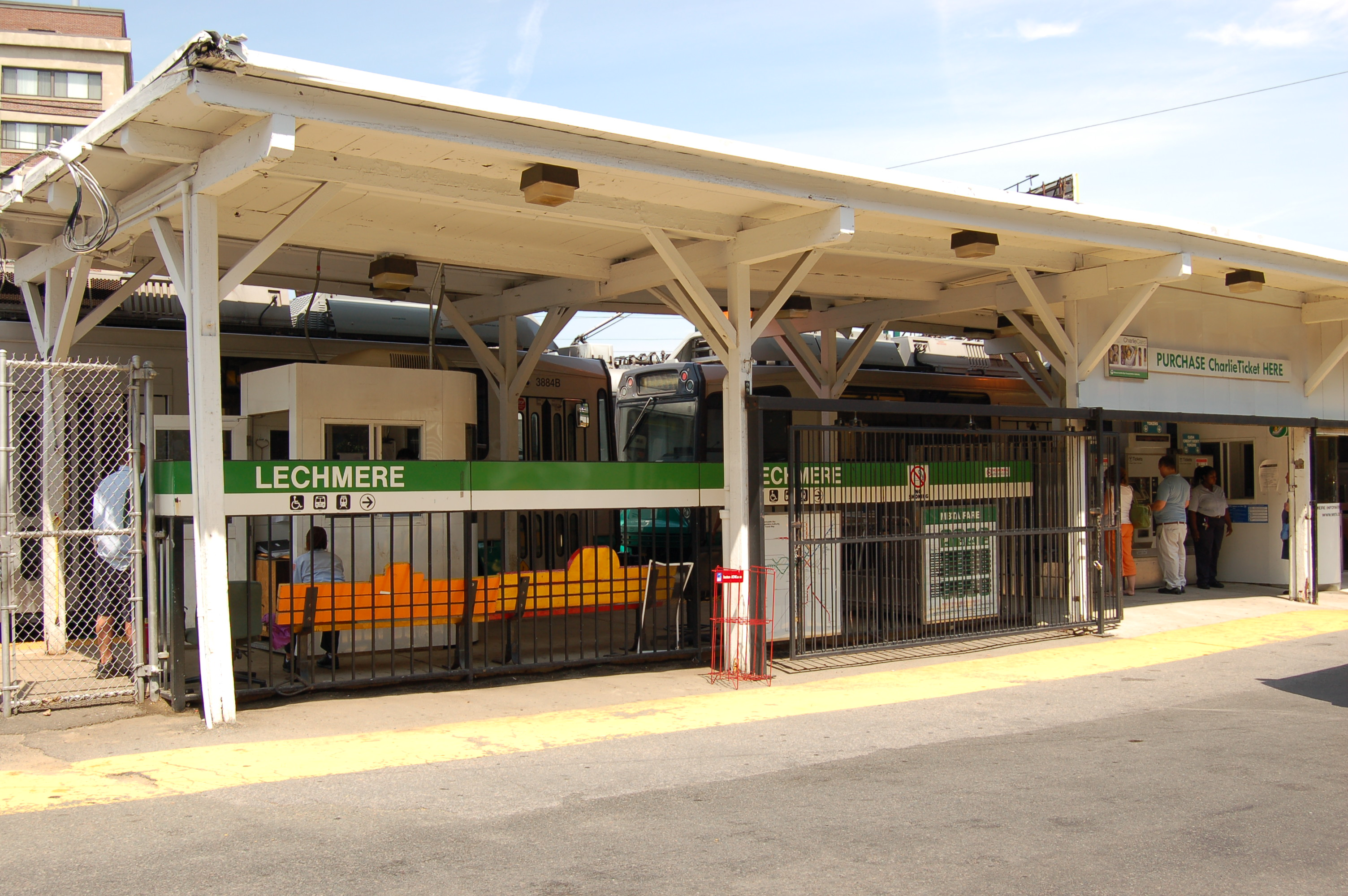
Inbound structure of the station in 2007

On June 25, 2004, service between Lechmere and North Station was suspended as the Causeway Street Elevated was removed, and the surface and elevated platforms at North Station were consolidated into a new underground "superstation". A Government Center–Lechmere shuttle bus was operated. Unlike during previous bus substitutions, which took place largely during evenings and weekends, bus operations at Lechmere were modified to accommodate the number of shuttle buses needed. The shuttle buses used the inbound busway, while regular bus service used only the outbound busway, with those buses operating in the reverse of the usual direction. Green Line E branch service to Lechmere resumed on November 12, 2005, with buses returned to their previous routing at the station.

The CharlieCard electronic fare collection system was installed at Lechmere in 2006, making it fare-controlled at all operating hours. Service past North Station was replaced with North Station–Lechmere buses from April 30 to November 4, 2011, as Science Park was rebuilt. The same bus routings as the 2004–05 closure were used. However, after the station reopened, buses continued to use only the outbound busway. This routing was deemed safer by the MBTA due to the fewer turns, though it was "extremely inconvenient to inbound passengers".

Timeline of which subway services have served Lechmere since 1922

=== Green Line Extension and new station ===
==== Early proposals ====
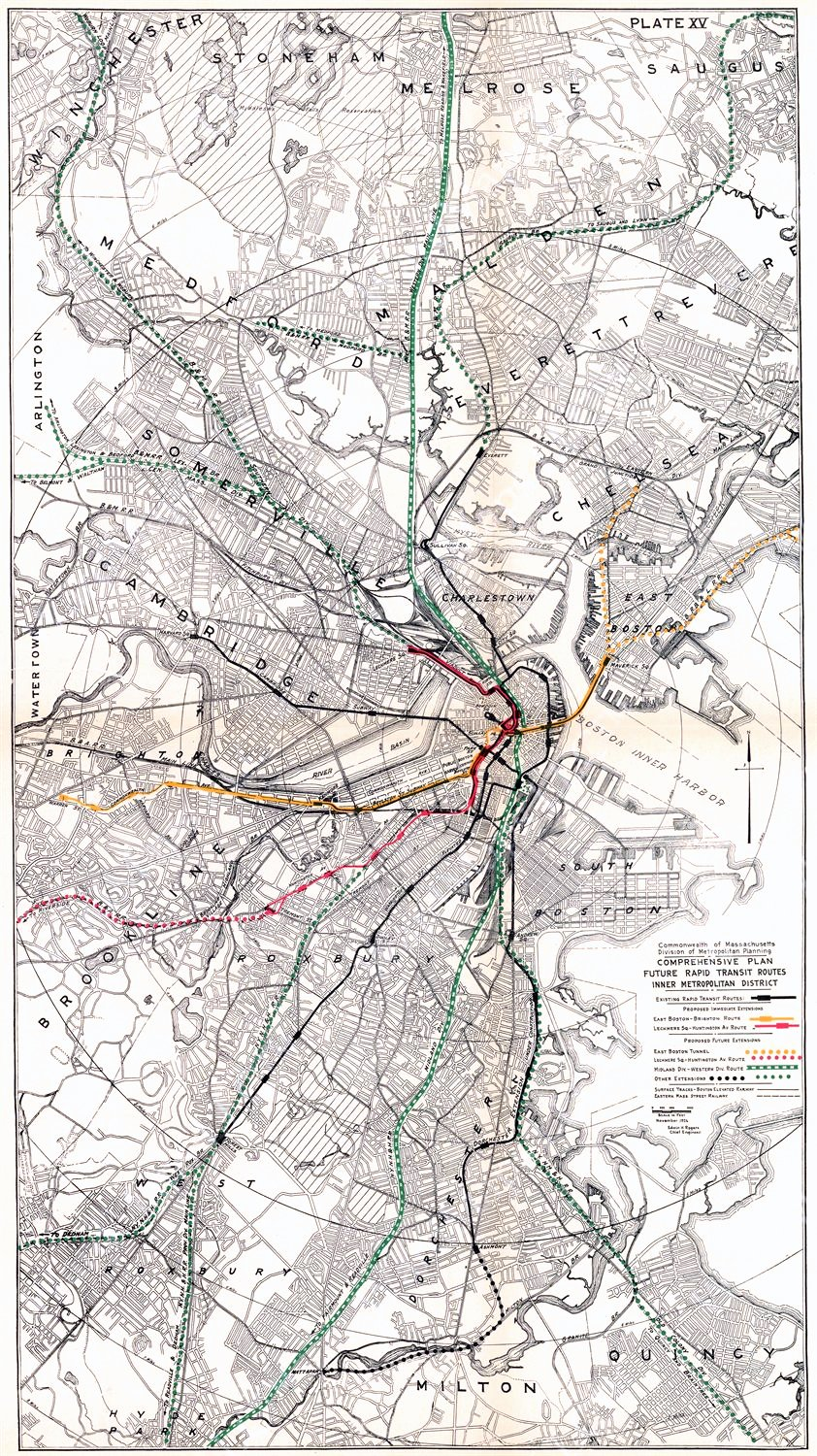
Map showing the 1926-proposed extensions northwest from Lechmere (at left)

In June 1922, several weeks before Lechmere station opened, the BERy proposed three new radial subways. One was to run northwest from Lechmere through Somerville and South Medford. In 1924, the BERy indicated that Lechmere was "not fitted to be a permanent transfer station, and while being used as such must fail to satisfy", recommending an extension to a larger transfer station. The Report on Improved Transportation Facilities, published by the Boston Division of Metropolitan Planning in 1926, recommended conversion of the Tremont Street subway to Maverick Square–Warren Street, Brighton and Lechmere Square–Brigham Circle, Roxbury rapid transit routes. Among the secondary priorities was an extension from Lechmere to North Cambridge, with several possible branches; it would have run in a dedicated median in the Northern Artery from Lechmere to Winter Hill, alongside the B&M Southern Division tracks to Somerville Junction, then followed the Fitchburg Cutoff to North Cambridge. Variations on this plan were proposed several times during the 1930s, including subway extensions from Haymarket or Bowdoin to replace the Lechmere Viaduct.

In 1943, the state legislature appointed a commission headed by Arthur W. Coolidge to plan for the future of transit in the Boston region. The 1945 and 1947 reports from the Coolidge Commission recommended nine suburban rapid transit extensions – most similar to the 1926 plan – along existing railroad lines. The proposed extension from Lechmere to Woburn followed the same alignment as the 1926 plan, albeit using an extended elevated structure rather than a subway north of Lechmere. The 1962 North Terminal Area Study, claiming that the 1959 Highland Branch conversion showed that PCC streetcars were inadequate for suburban rapid transit service, recommended that the elevated Lechmere–North Station segment be abandoned. The Main Line (now the Orange Line) was to be relocated along the B&M Western Route with branches to Woburn or Arlington via the Southern Division. (Note: The MTA proposed to close Lechmere on weekends beginning June 23, 1962, but this was cancelled after opposition from the state legislature.)

The 1966 Program for Mass Transportation, the MBTA's first long-range plan, listed an approximately 1-mile (1.6 km) extension from Lechmere to Washington Street as an immediate priority. A second phase of the project would extend Green Line service from Washington Street to Mystic Valley Parkway (Route 16) or West Medford. An extension from Lechmere to Somerville or Medford was listed as low priority in several 1970s and early 1980s due to the addition of Davis station to the Red Line Northwest Extension, which opened in 1984. Plans in 1978 for redevelopment of the Lechmere Canal area called for a new elevated station on the east side of the O'Brien Highway. It was to have a 200-foot (61 m)-wide deck, which included a busway loop for cross-platform transfers to Green Line trains.

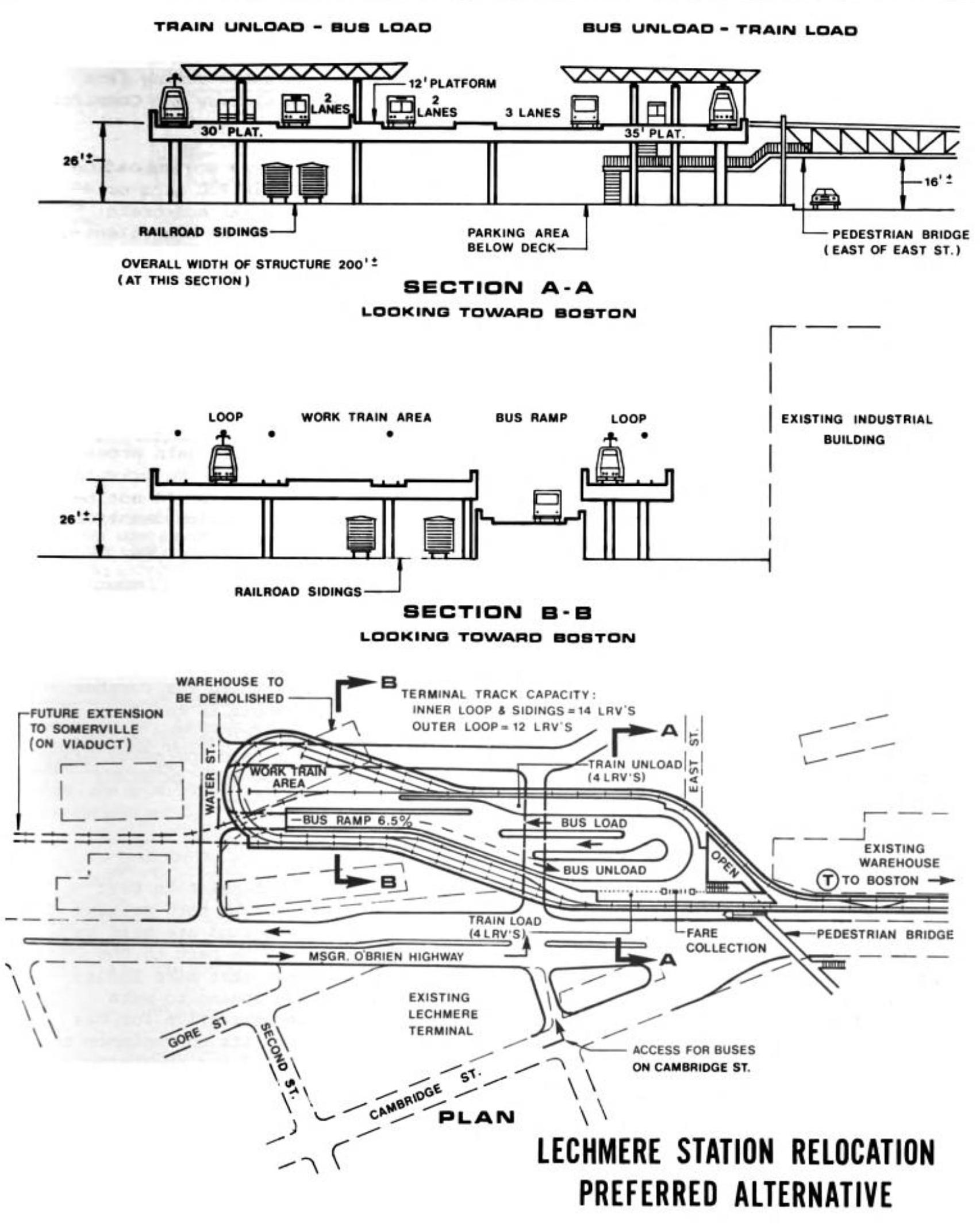
1978 plans for an elevated station

In 1980, the MBTA began a study of the "Green Line Northwest Corridor" (from Haymarket to Medford) with three area of focus: replacement of the Causeway Street elevated, replacement of Lechmere station, and extension beyond Lechmere. An evaluation report for the extension was published in 1981 and updated in 1984. Alternatives recommended for further evaluation included a Green Line extension to Tufts, a Green Line extension to Union Square, and a busway to Tufts and Davis. Later in the 1980s, the MBTA made plans to relocate Lechmere station as a precursor to an extension. A new elevated station would be located at the same site as the 1970s plans, with a new vehicle storage yard and maintenance facility to the north. The project was not pursued due to lack of available funding.

==== Planning ====
In 1991, the state agreed to build a set of transit projects as part of an agreement with the Conservation Law Foundation (CLF), which had threatened a lawsuit over auto emissions from the Central Artery/Tunnel Project (Big Dig). Among these projects was a "Green Line Extension To Ball Square/Tufts University", to be complete by the end of 2011. In 1999, Guilford Transportation Industries (GTI) proposed to develop 50 acres (20 ha) of disused railroad yards on the east side of Lechmere Square. GTI and the MBTA reached an agreement under which GTI would construct a new Lechmere station and maintenance facility – similar to the late 1980s proposal – as a precursor to the extension project. In return, GTI would receive rights to redevelop the site of the surface station. The deal between the MBTA and GTI was criticized by Cambridge officials for its secrecy, while existing residents were concerned that the relocated station would require a difficult crossing of O'Brien Highway for pedestrians from East Cambridge.

After a 2005 lawsuit by the city of Somerville and the CLF, the state began planning of the Green Line Extension (GLX), including a second branch from Lechmere to Union Square. By 2006, plans for the development (NorthPoint) called for a $70 million Lechmere station to open in 2010. The elevated station was to have a half-cylinder glass canopy, with an office building constructed over its northern end. It would initially be named "Lechmere at NorthPoint", though the developer hoped to rename it simply "NorthPoint". In 2007, the development stalled due to disagreements between the two firms involved. With the relocated station in jeopardy, the state took over station planning and incorporated it into GLX planning.

Lechmere was a proposed stop on the Urban Ring – a circumferential bus rapid transit line designed to connect the existing radial MBTA rail lines to reduce overcrowding in the downtown stations. Under draft plans released in 2008, the Urban Ring would have approached Lechmere Square from the north on a dedicated bridge over the MBTA Commuter Rail Maintenance Facility, continuing on Morgan Avenue and First Street. Platforms would have been located near Water Street under the relocated Green Line station. The project was cancelled in 2010.

The draft environmental impact report (DEIR) was released in October 2009. Preliminary plans in the DEIR kept the location and arched canopy of the previous design, though without the building above. The main headhouse would be located north of First Street at the north end of the platform, with only secondary egress at the southern end. A one-way southbound busway would run from Water Street to First Street, and two parking lots would replace the existing lot. The final environmental impact report was released in July 2010. Changes from the DEIR included a redesigned headhouse, a reduction in the platform length from 450 feet (140 m) to 225 feet (69 m), fewer parking spaces, and realignment of the busway into a loop accessed from Water Street.

In July 2010, the Massachusetts Department of Transportation (MassDOT) announced that the project was delayed to October 2015. In November 2010, the MBTA reached an agreement with Pan Am Railways (formerly GTI) and the NorthPoint developers under which the MBTA would receive property on the east side of O'Brien Highway needed for the new Lechmere station; in return, Pan Am would receive the existing Lechmere station site for redevelopment. The agreement, which also included MBTA trackage rights on the Worcester Branch and in New Hampshire, was amended in January 2011 and finalized that March. By June 2011, the planned arched canopy over the platform and tracks had been replaced with a simpler canopy over the platform. Wind shields on the platform were added to the design later that year. An additional delay, with service beginning between late 2018 and 2020, was announced in August 2011.

The City of Somerville, MassDOT, and the MBTA reached an agreement in August 2012 to open the Union Square Branch and Lechmere station by early 2017, with construction to begin in 2014. In September 2013, MassDOT awarded a $393 million (equivalent to $520 million in 2024), 51-month contract for the construction of Phase 2/2A – Lechmere station, the Union Square Branch, and the first segment of the Medford Branch to Washington Street station – with the stations to open in early 2017. Updated plans presented in June 2013 replaced the secondary egress with a second headhouse south of East Street. The platform was extended back to 450 feet, and the parking was moved to the north to allow development adjacent to the station. Design of the station was completed in late 2014.

==== Redesign ====
In August 2015, the MBTA disclosed that project costs had increased substantially, with Phase 2A rising from $387 million to $898 million. This triggered a wholesale re-evaluation of the GLX project. In December 2015, the MBTA ended its contracts with four firms. Construction work in progress continued, but no new contracts were awarded. At that time, cancellation of the project was considered possible, as were elimination of the Union Square Branch and other cost reduction measures. In May 2016, the MassDOT and MBTA boards approved a modified project that had undergone value engineering to reduce its cost. Stations were simplified to resemble D branch surface stations rather than full rapid transit stations, with canopies, faregates, escalators, and some elevators removed. Lechmere station retained its redundant elevators due to the elevation of the platform, but escalators were removed. The platform canopy was replaced with four bus-stop-style shelters.

In December 2016, the MBTA announced a new planned opening date of 2021 for the extension. A design-build contract for the GLX was awarded in November 2017. The winning proposal included six additive options – elements removed during value engineering – including full-length canopies at all stations, as well as a second elevator in the north headhouse at Lechmere. Station design advanced from 10% in March 2018 to 76% that December and to 100% in October 2019. The 100% design added a second entrance to the north headhouse, providing direct access both from the busway and North First Street. The platform length was set at 355 feet (108 m), between the previous planned lengths. Unlike the pre-2015 designs, no parking lot was included.

==== Construction and opening ====
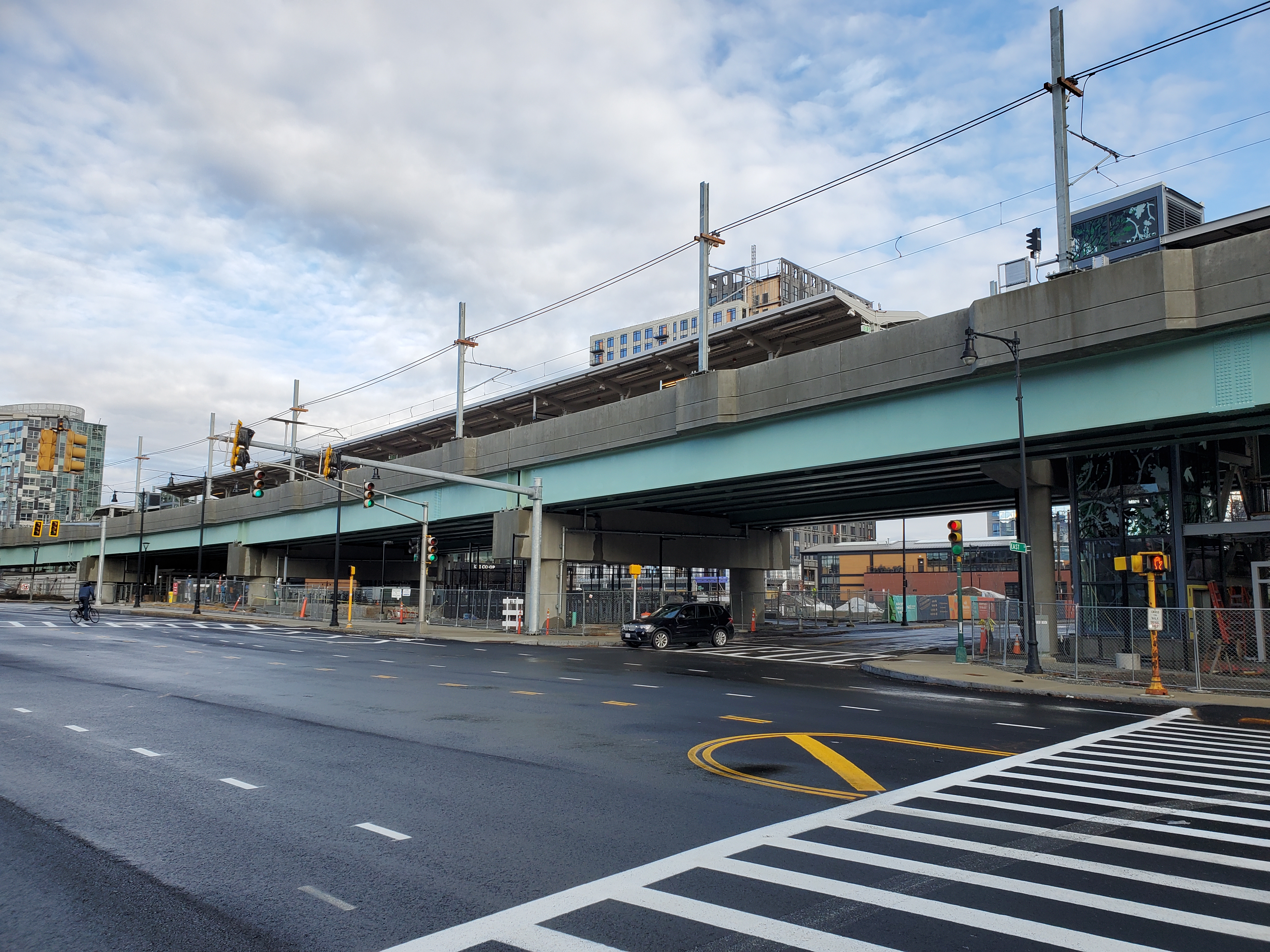
Station construction in December 2021

Early GLX work included the demolition of a disused MBTA facility at 21 Water Street to make room for the new Lechmere station. Notice to proceed for the early work was issued to Barletta Heavy Division on January 31, 2013, and construction started in March. The 21 Water Street facility was demolished in August 2014. The 369-space parking lot at Lechmere was closed on June 22, 2017, for construction preparation.

A groundbreaking ceremony for the main GLX construction phase was held on June 25, 2018. Construction began in mid-2019. Work at Lechmere station started by September 2019; the concrete pillars for the viaduct were poured later that year, while installation of the beams supporting the trackways and platform began in January 2020. Installation of the beams through the station was completed in April 2020.

The project required a temporary service suspension while the elevated structure to the old station was replaced with the new viaduct. The final day of service to the old station was May 23, 2020, with the final revenue trip leaving early in the morning of the 24th. Demolition of the old elevated structure began within hours. A bus shuttle between Lechmere and North Station – with dedicated bus lanes on the Charles River Dam Bridge – began on May 24, 2020. (The bus shuttle used the west busway at the former station, while local bus routes continued to use the east busway.) At that time, service was expected to resume in April 2021. After removal of the tracks, the former yard area was repurposed for construction employee parking.

Station construction was "well underway" by early August 2020, with the headhouse shells partially built; the platform was poured around August 10. The elevator towers for the north headhouse were erected in October 2020, followed by the tower for the south headhouse in November. Steelwork for the canopy, the artwork on the elevator shafts, and a signal instrument house were installed in March and April 2021. The bus loop was under construction by June 2021, with the plaza under the station nearly complete, and the canopy roof was installed that month. Train testing between for Lechmere and the Union Square Branch began in December 2021.

By March 2021, the station was expected to open in October 2021. This was delayed in June 2021 to a December 2021 opening, then again in October 2021 to a March 2022 opening. On February 24, 2022, the MBTA announced that Lechmere and the Union Square Branch would open on March 21, 2022, while the Medford Branch would open in "late summer". Initial Union Square service was operated by the E branch. In August 2022, the MBTA indicated that the Medford Branch opening was delayed to November 2022. The Green Line between Union Square and Government Center was closed from August 22 to September 18, 2022; the closure allowed for final integration of the Medford Branch, elimination of a speed restriction on the Lechmere Viaduct, and other work. At the conclusion of the closure, the D branch was extended to Union Square, replacing the E. Medford Branch service began on December 12, 2022.

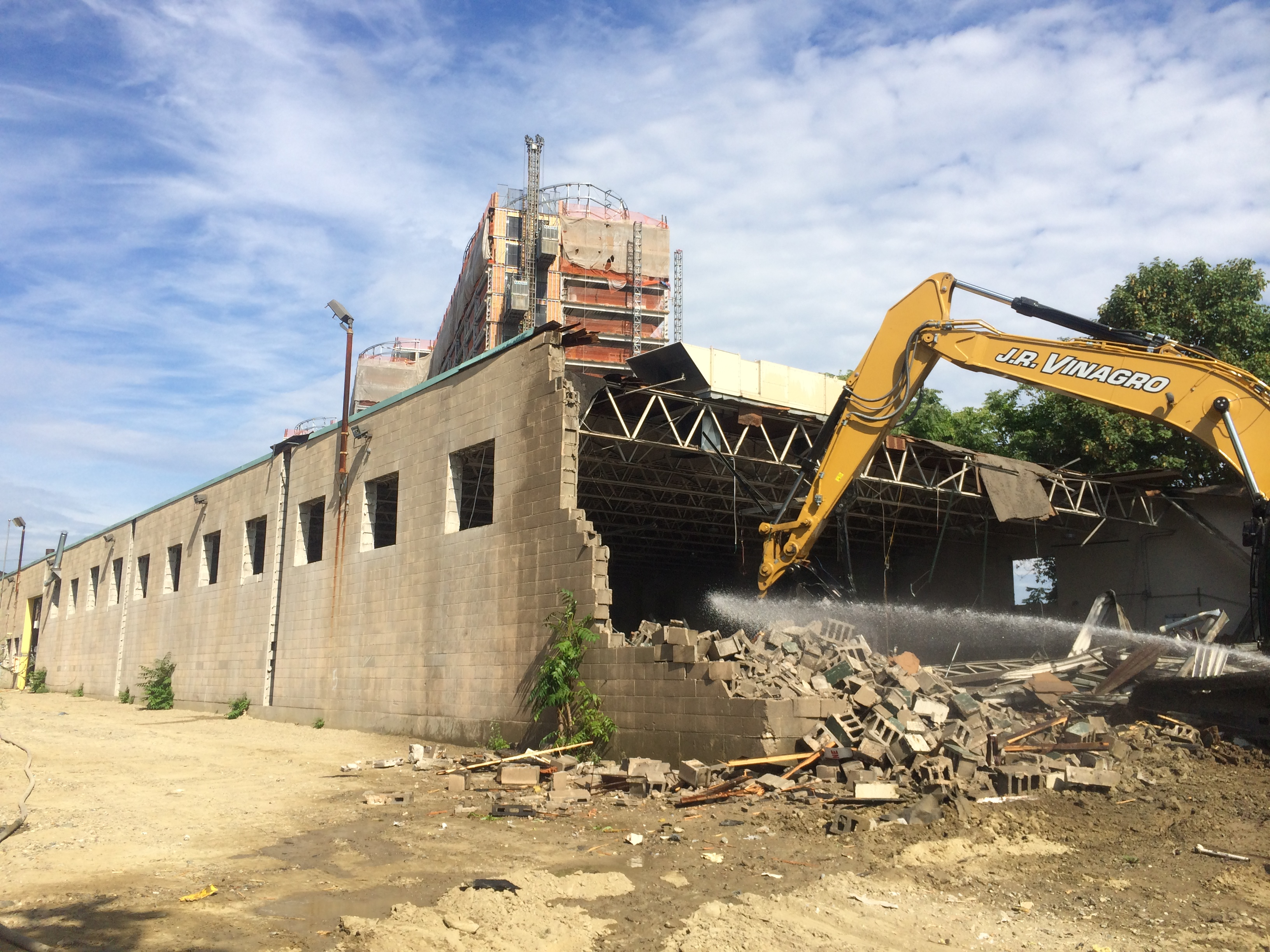
Demolition of 21 Water Street in August 2014

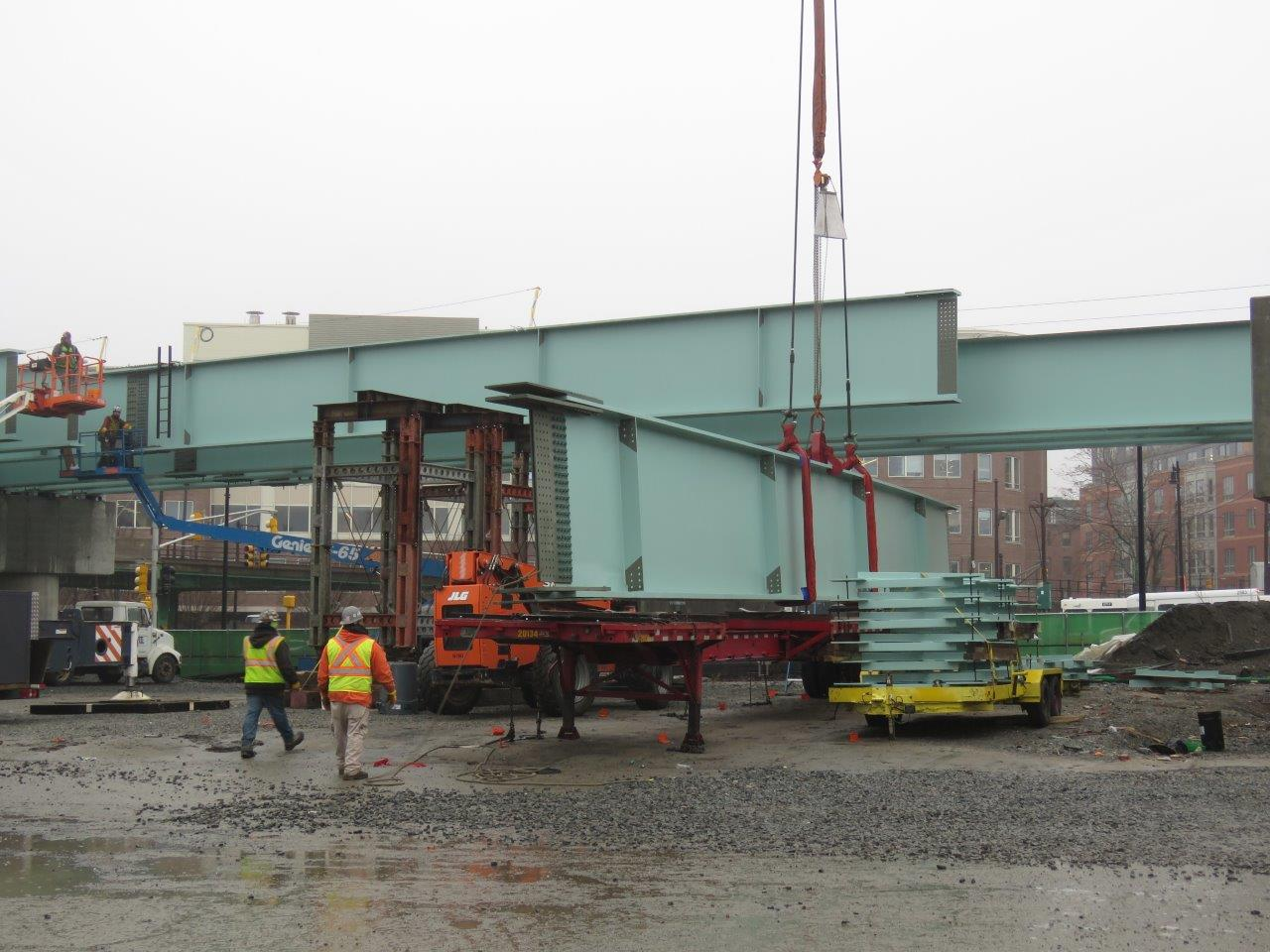
Steel work in February 2020

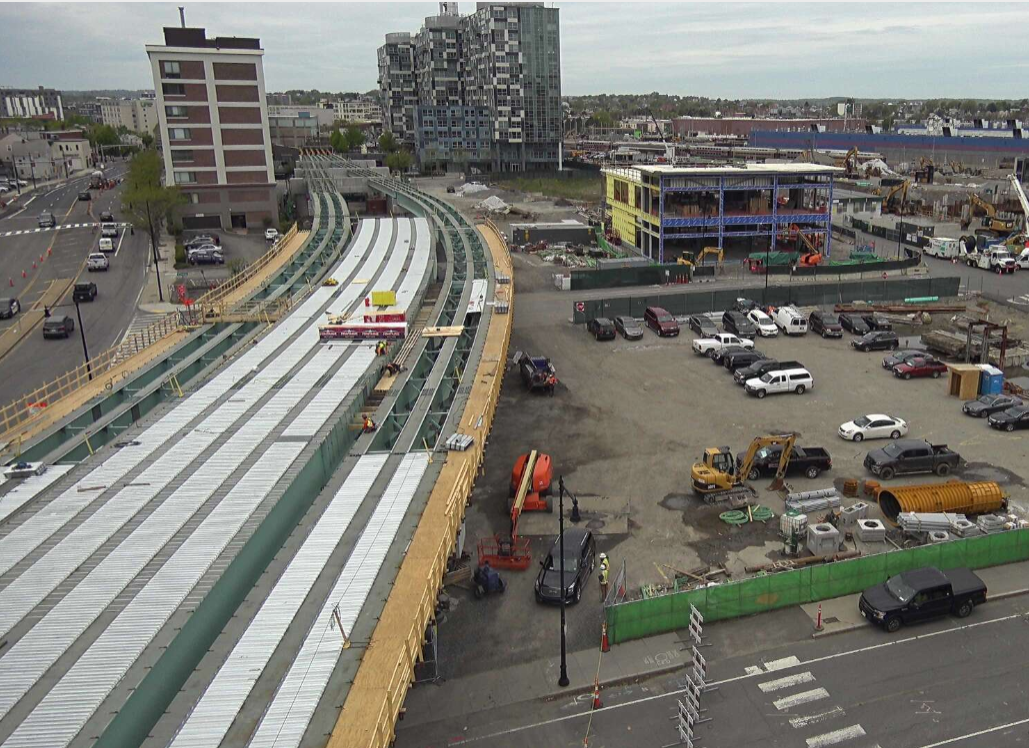
Station construction in May 2020

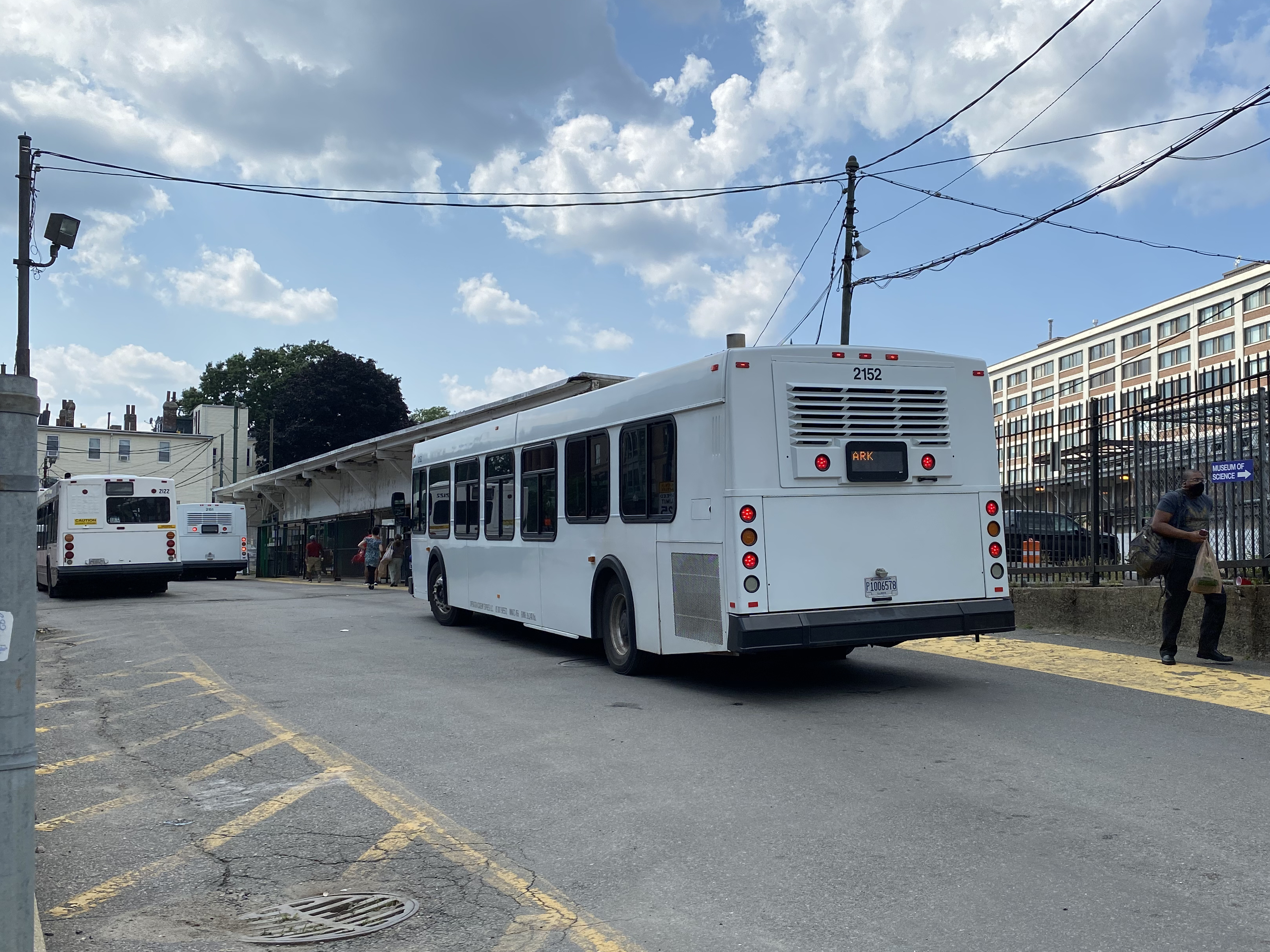
Shuttle buses at Lechmere in August 2021

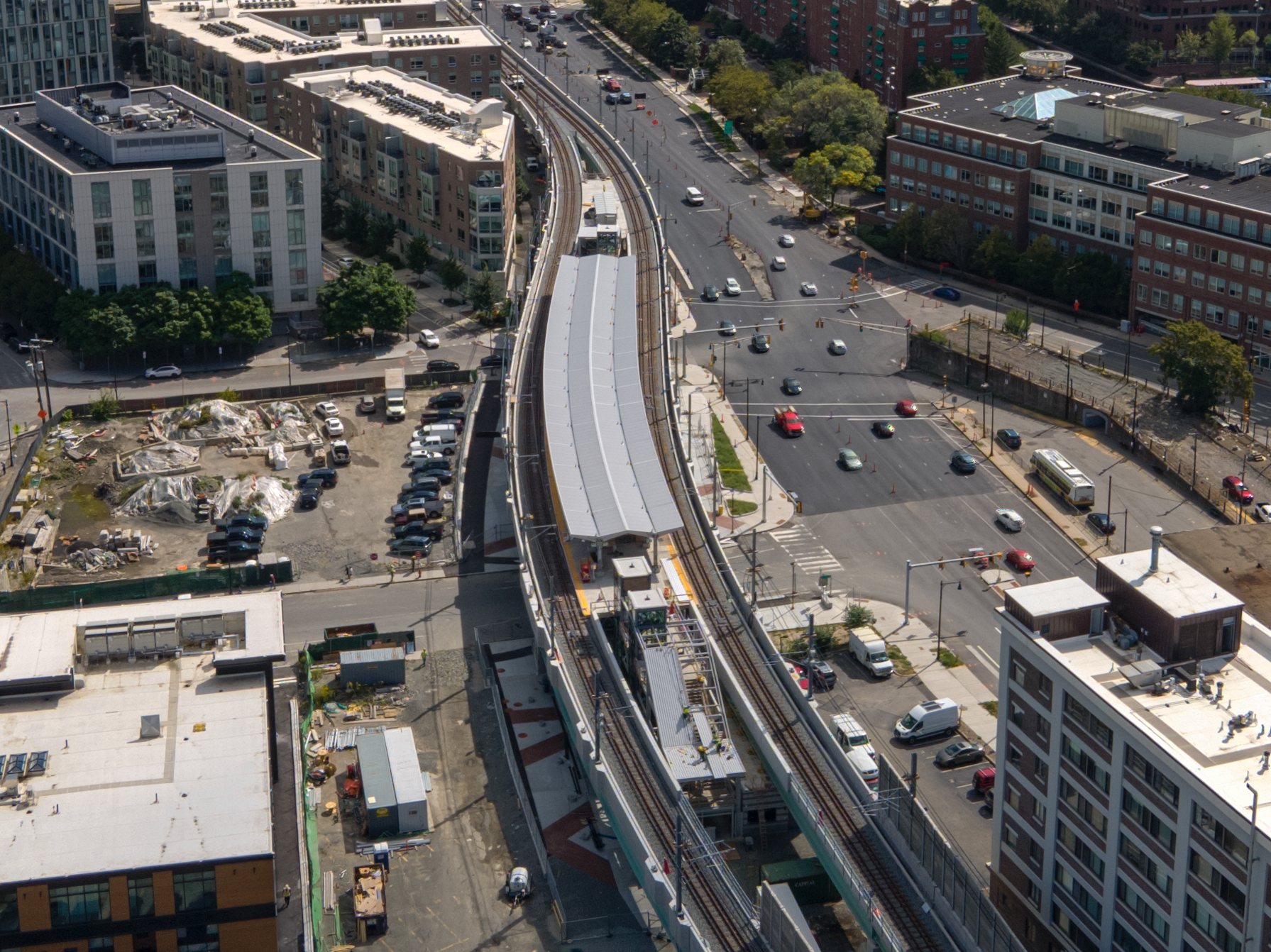
Station construction in September 2021
