= Science Park station (MBTA) =

Light rail station in Boston, Massachusetts, US

Science Park / West End
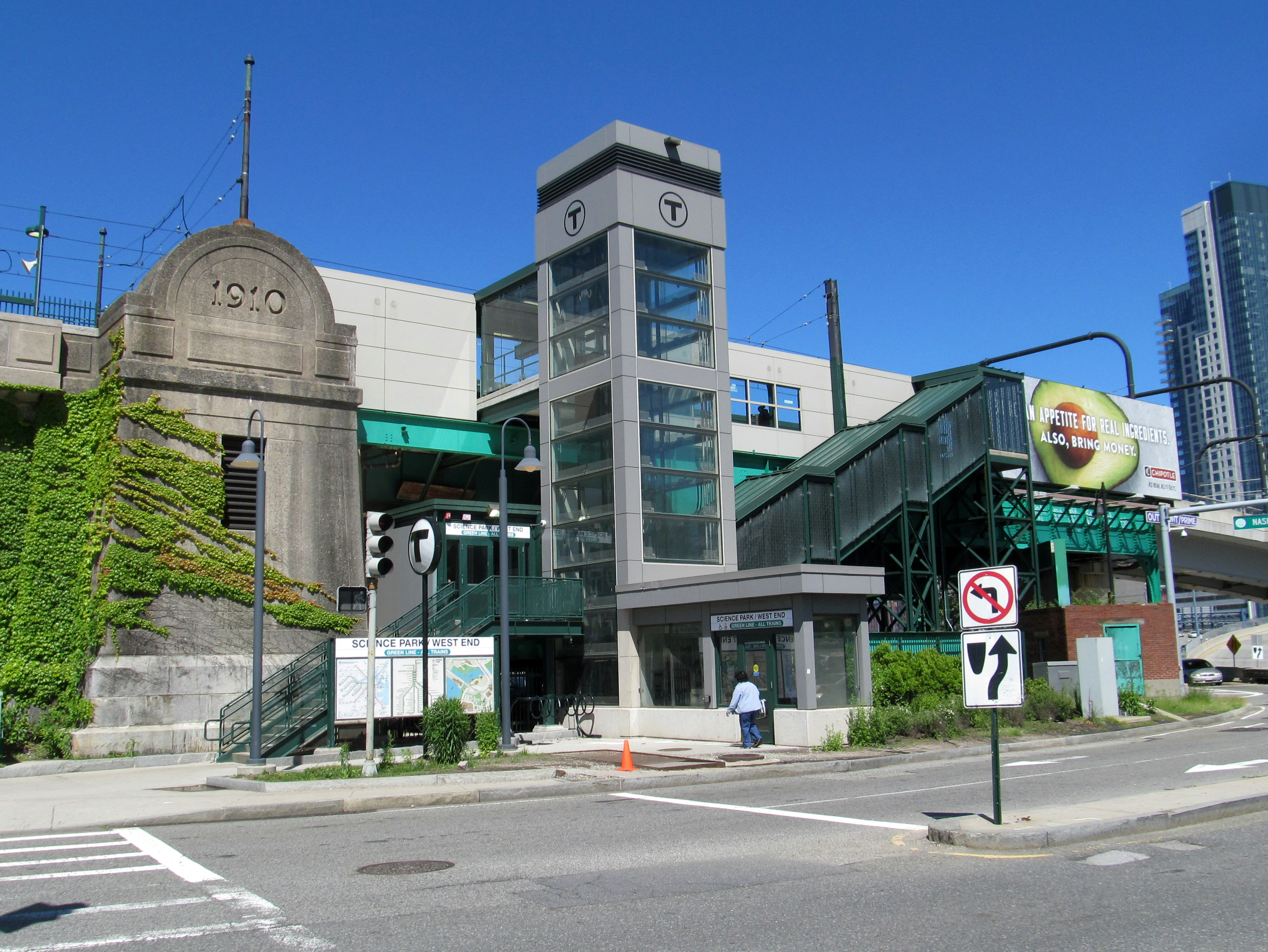
- Science Park station in June 2017

General information
- Location: Leverett Circle; Boston, Massachusetts, United States
- Coordinates: 42.36678°N 71.06784°W
- Line: Lechmere Viaduct
- Platforms: 2 side platforms

Construction
- Accessible: Yes

History
- Opened: August 20, 1955
- Rebuilt: April 30–November 4, 2011

Passengers
- FY2019: 873 daily boardings

Services
Preceding station	MBTA	Following station
Lechmere toward Union Square	Green Line D branch	North Station toward Riverside
Lechmere toward Medford/Tufts	Green Line E branch	North Station toward Heath Street
Former services
Preceding station	MBTA	Following station
Lechmere Terminus	Green Line B branch Cut back in 1980	North Station toward Boston College
Lechmere Terminus	Green Line C branch Cut back in 1981	North Station toward Cleveland Circle
Location

Science Park station (signed as Science Park/West End) is an elevated light rail station on the Massachusetts Bay Transportation Authority (MBTA) Green Line in Boston, Massachusetts, United States. The station is located at the Boston end of the Charles River Dam Bridge at Leverett Circle. It is at the southeast end of the Lechmere Viaduct, which carries the Green Line over the Charles River. The station is named for the nearby Boston Museum of Science. With 873 daily boardings by a FY 2019 count, Science Park is the least-used fare-controlled station on the Green Line, and the second-lowest on the MBTA subway system after Suffolk Downs.

The Lechmere Viaduct was built in 1912; Science Park station was built on the viaduct in 1955 to serve the new museum. Until 2005, the station was accessed with a footbridge over Leverett Circle. "West End" was added to station signs in 2009 to reflect the West End neighborhood. The station was closed for six months in 2011 for accessibility renovations. It was also closed in 2004–2005 and 2020–2022 during shutdowns of the viaduct for other projects.

== Station design ==
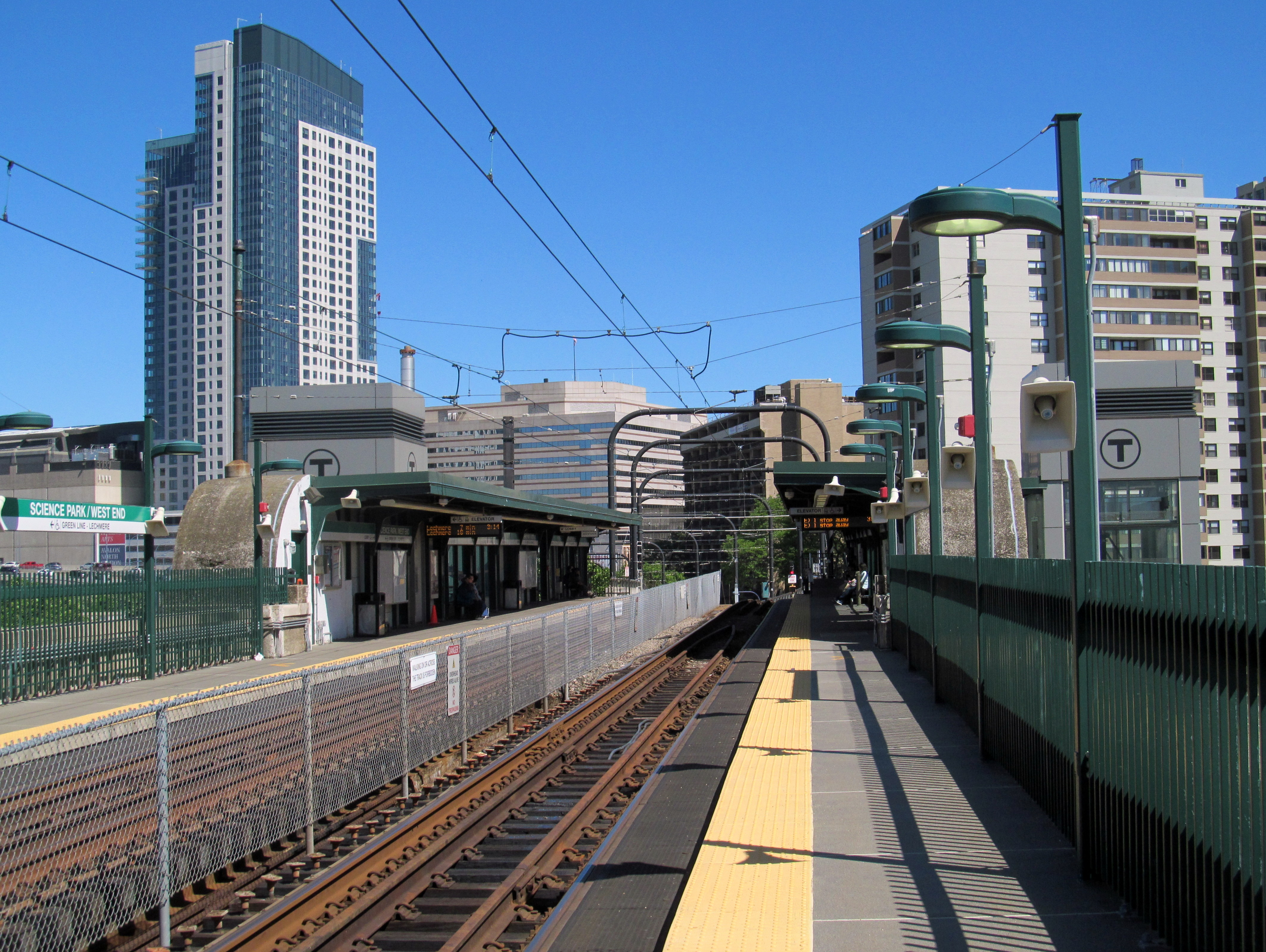
The elevated platforms in 2017

Science Park station is elevated above Leverett Circle, where the Charles River Dam Bridge meets Storrow Drive at the north corner of the West End neighborhood. (The namesake Museum of Science is about 1,000 feet (300 m) west along the Dam Bridge.) The station is oriented with its two tracks and two side platforms running roughly northwest–southeast. The northwest halves of the 250-foot (76 m)-long platforms are on the concrete Lechmere Viaduct, while the other halves and the main station structure are on a section of steel viaduct.

The entrances to the station are on a traffic island in the center of Leverett Circle, with crosswalks crossing the circle in several directions. The main fare lobby is located on a mezzanine level under the southeast half of the station, with stairs connecting it to street level and the platforms. Each platform has one elevator connecting it to street level and to the paid area of the main fare lobby, making the station accessible. Both elevators also have a small fare lobby with a single faregate at street level. A mini-high platform (for accessible boarding on older Type 7 LRVs) is located at the far end of each platform. With 873 daily boardings by a FY 2019 count, Science Park is the least-used fare-controlled station on the Green Line, and the second-lowest on the MBTA subway system after Suffolk Downs.

== History ==
=== Construction ===
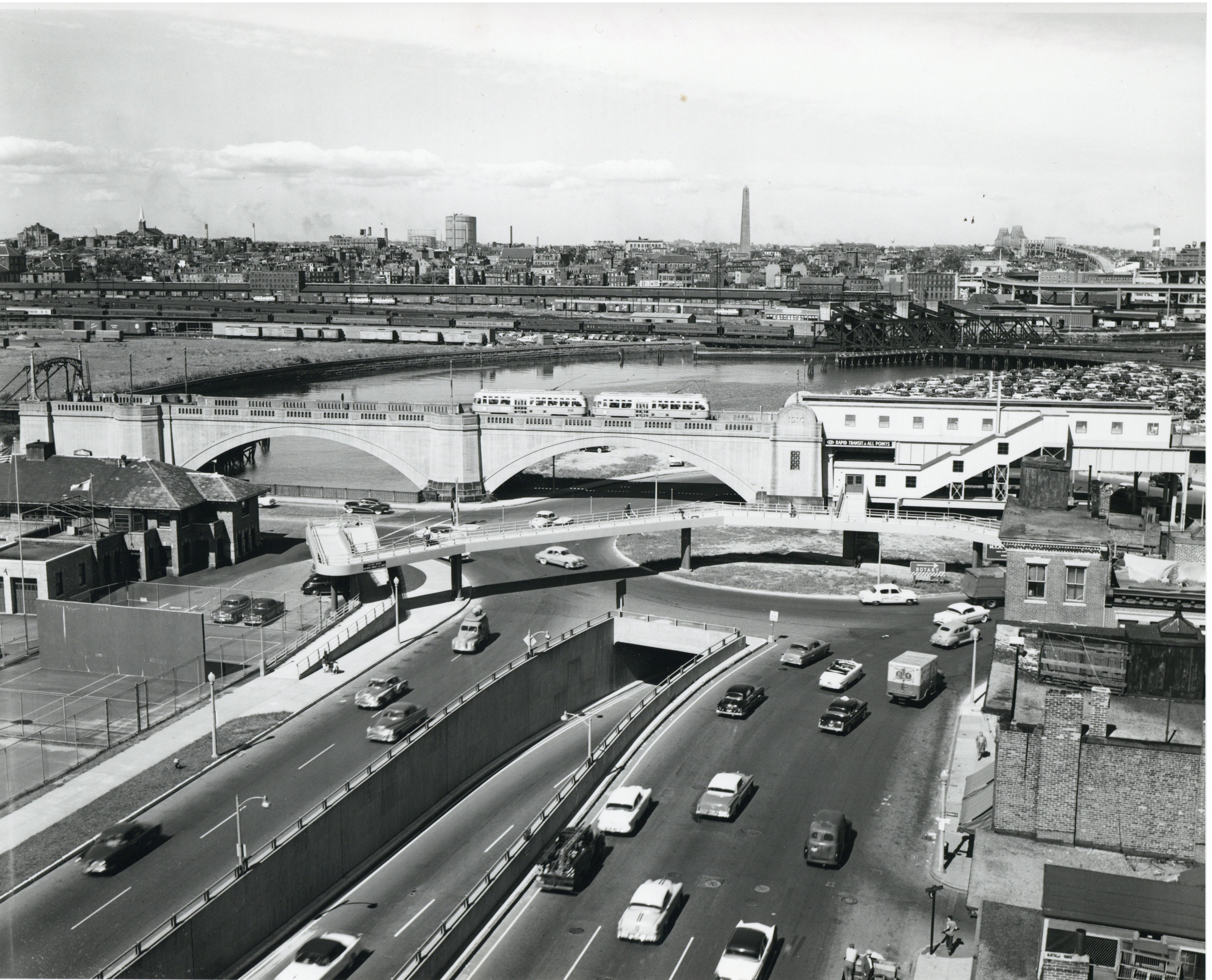
Science Park station in August 1955 just after opening

The Lechmere Viaduct and Causeway Street elevated opened in June 1912, providing a grade-separated route for streetcars from Somerville, Cambridge, and Charlestown to reach the Tremont Street subway. The 1-mile (1.6 km) elevated route was intended to reduce travel time from Lechmere Square to the subway; the only intermediate station was North Station. This substantially reduced transit service to the north part of the densely populated West End. (Some surface streetcar lines continued to run across the Charles River Dam Bridge until the 1920s, and bus routes ran on Charles Street from 1925 to 1927 and 1935 to the early 1940s.) An infill station on the Causeway Street elevated near Barton Street in the West End was proposed by the Boston Transit Commission in 1917 but never built.

The Museum of Science opened its Science Park (Note: The name "Science Park" for the museum was coined in 1949 by governor Paul A. Dever. Although not widely used for the museum, the name was used for the station.) museum campus on the Dam Bridge in 1951. The museum and its director Bradford Washburn began lobbying the state legislature in 1953 to approve a new station at Leverett Circle to serve the museum. The Metropolitan Transit Authority (MTA) opposed construction of the station, arguing that fare revenue would not cover the $150,000 to $250,000 cost (equivalent to $1.4 to 2.3 million in 2024) of constructing the station. A bill authorizing and directing the MTA to construct the station was signed by then-governor Christian Herter on April 29, 1954. The bill set the name of the station as Science Park.

The MTA board approved the station on May 14, 1954, with an estimated cost of $225,000 (equivalent to $2.1 million in 2024). Aside from the museum, the station was intended to improve access to Massachusetts General Hospital for those taking buses to Lechmere or Boston and Maine Railroad trains to North Station, who previously had to walk from North Station or backtrack to Charles station via Park Street. It was also to serve a Massachusetts Registry of Motor Vehicles office, Massachusetts Eye and Ear, and the West End neighborhood – the latter about to be cleared for a controversial urban renewal project.

The board approved a construction contract on November 3, 1954, with work beginning soon after. The Metropolitan District Commission constructed a footbridge across Storrow Drive (opened in 1951) in 1955 at a cost of $120,000 (equivalent to $1.11 million in 2024). It connected directly to the above-ground fare mezzanine of the station. The steel frame of the station was in place by April 1955. Science Park station opened on August 20, 1955. Despite claims from the museum and other supporters that the station would serve half a million annual riders, the MTA commented in its year-end report that "Patronage of this station has been, and continues to be, negligible."

=== MBTA era ===
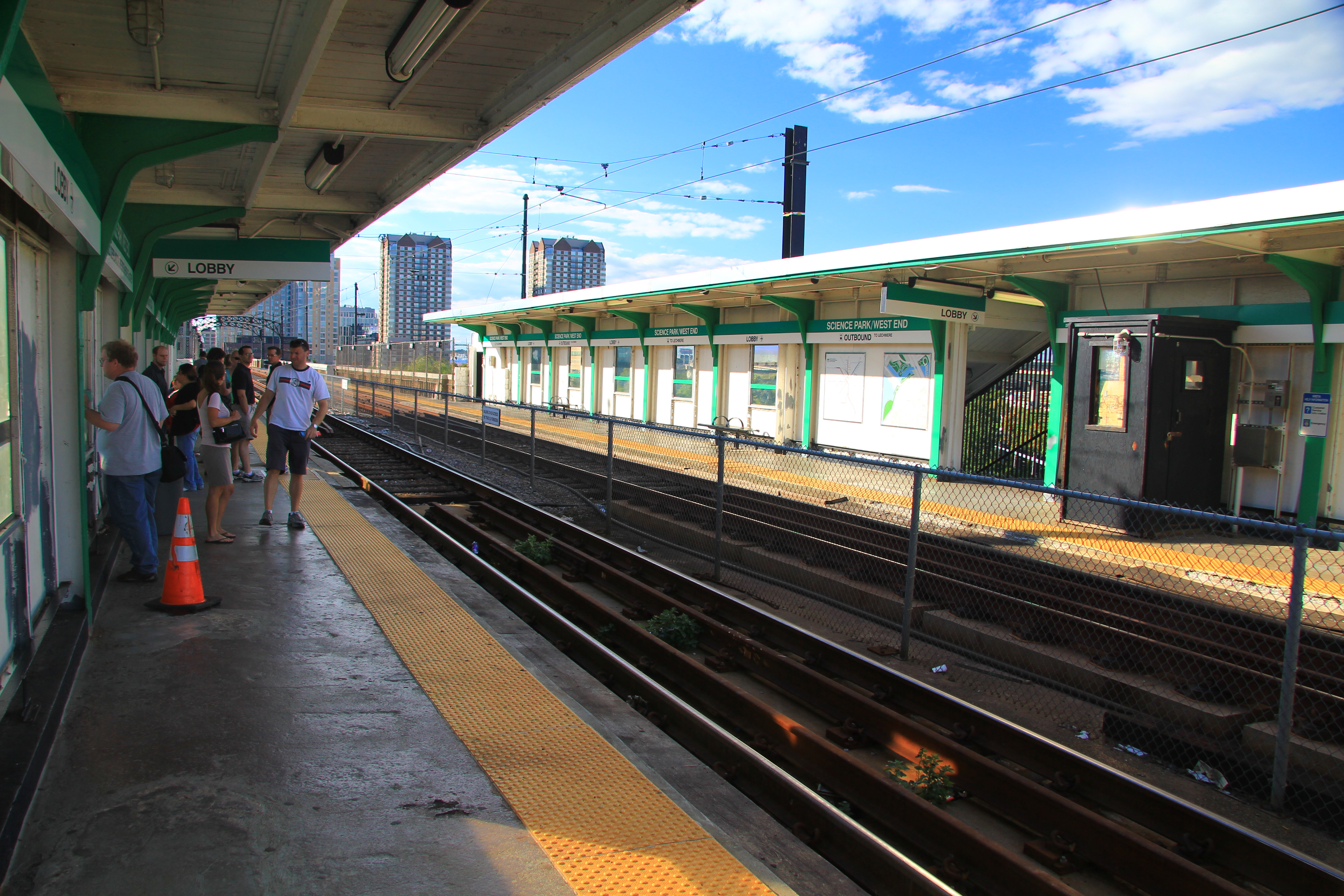
Science Park station in 2010, just prior to renovations

The Massachusetts Bay Transportation Authority (MBTA) replaced the MTA in 1964. The lightly used Science Park station was not significantly modified for the remainder of the century. Around 1982, the fare collection booth was closed; passengers used an automated token machine and paid on board trains. The station was closed from June 25, 2004, to November 12, 2005, while the Causeway Street elevated was replaced by a new tunnel under TD Garden. A sloped concrete viaduct was built to connect Science Park station to the new tunnel.

The footbridge over Leverett Circle was removed in 2005 as part of Big Dig construction (to allow for the addition on an underpass to Storrow Drive), though the state promised to replace it. In 2016, the Massachusetts Department of Transportation began designing a replacement bridge. The CharlieCard electronic fare collection system was installed at Prudential in December 2006, making it fare-controlled at all operating hours. On January 21, 2009, station signage was changed to read "Science Park/West End", though MBTA maps continued to use the shorter name.

In 2006, the MBTA began planning a renovation of the station for accessibility. Design work was completed, and an environmental assessment published, in June 2009. That August, the Executive Office of Energy and Environmental Affairs determined that a full environmental impact report was not necessary. Initial plans for the $22 million project called for the station to remain open during most of the construction period, with the two platforms closed for sequential six-month periods. This was changed to a single six-month closure of Science Park and Lechmere stations – with no trains operating over the viaduct – to reduce the construction duration by six months and reduce costs.

The stations closed on April 30, 2011, for construction to proceed. Work included the building of two elevators with street-level fare lobbies, widening the platforms, replacement of platform canopies, reconstruction of the stairways, and general code compliance. The platform level was raised slightly to allow level boarding on low-floor Type 8 LRVs, while "mini-high" ramps were added to allow accessible boarding on older high-floor Type 7 LRVs. While both stations were closed, the MBTA operated a free shuttle bus service connecting them to North Station. Science Park station was reopened and regular service between Lechmere and North Station resumed on November 5, 2011.

Only the E branch served Science Park from when service resumed after the 2004–05 closure until 2022. On May 24, 2020, service between North Station and Lechmere was temporarily replaced with shuttle buses due to Green Line Extension construction. In January 2022, the MBTA made accessibility improvements on the platforms, including new tactile edge strips. E branch service north of North Station to Lechmere resumed on March 21, 2022, accompanied by an extension to Union Square. The Green Line was closed between Union Square and Government Center from August 22 to September 18, 2022; the closure allowed for final integration of a second northern branch, elimination of a speed restriction on the Lechmere Viaduct, demolition of the Government Center Garage, and other work. Since September 2022, both D and E branch trains have served Science Park.
