= EZRide =

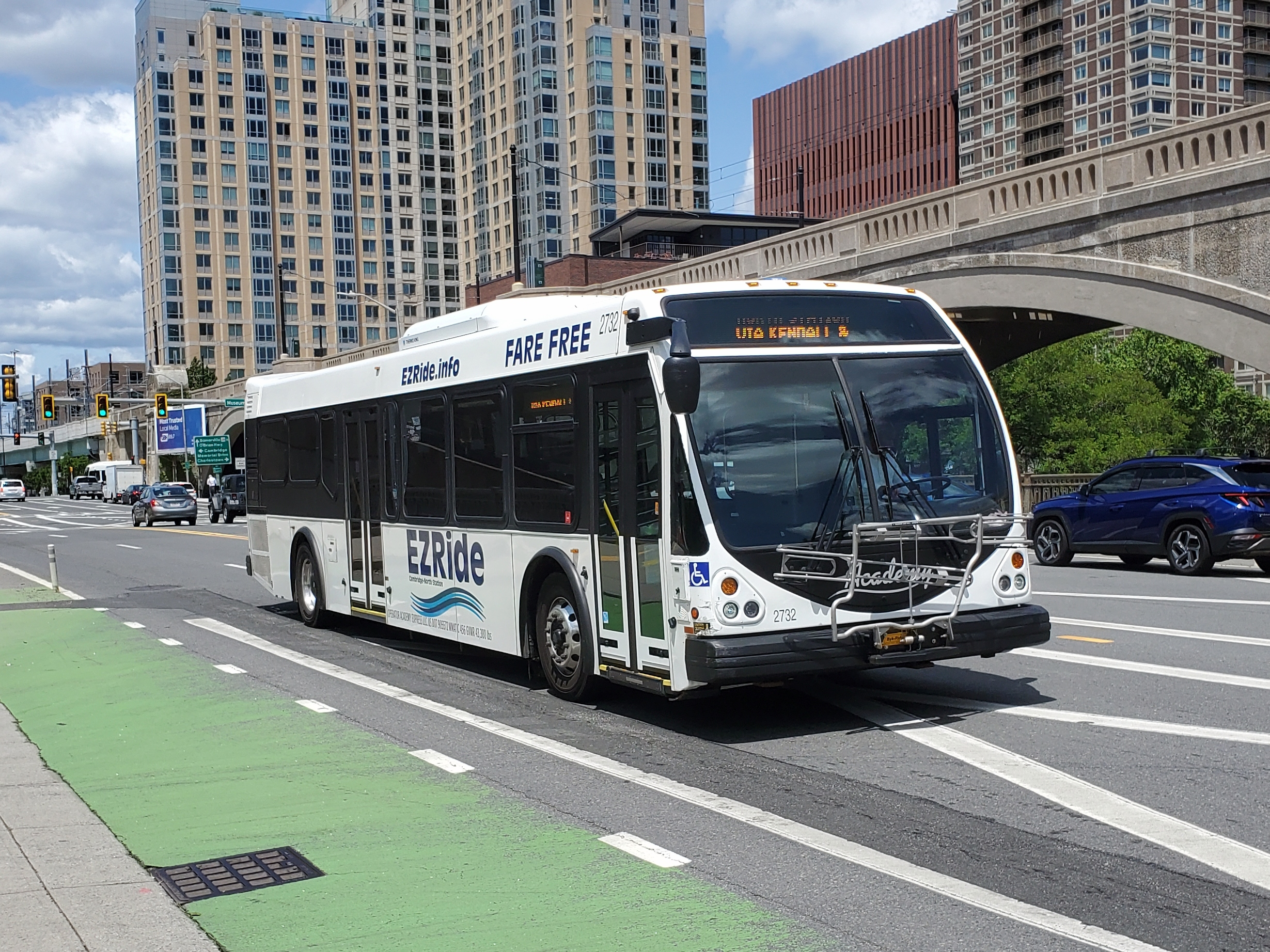
- An EZRide bus on the Charles River Dam Bridge in 2025

Overview
- Operator: Academy Bus Lines under contract to the Charles River Transportation Management Association
- Began service: 2002

Route
- Locale: Cambridge and Boston, Massachusetts
- Start: North Station (weekdays); Lechmere station (weekends)
- End: Cambridgeport (weekdays); Kendall Square (weekends)

EZRide is a bus service in Greater Boston operated by Academy Bus Lines under contract to the Charles River Transportation Management Association. It operates between North Station in Boston, Massachusetts and Cambridgeport in Cambridge, Massachusetts, via Lechmere station, Kendall Square, and University Park at MIT.

== History ==
EZRide service began in 2002. By 2012, daily ridership averaged 2,500. Buses were operated by Paul Revere Transportation, until June 17, 2024, when the contract was given to Academy Bus Lines. Until 2025, service operated only on weekdays; it operated between North Station and Cambridgeport at peak hours, and between Kendall Square and Cambridgeport midday. Service was increased on April 14, 2025: midday service was extended to North Station, while weekend service was added on the Lechmere–Kendall portion of the route.

== Service ==
On weekdays, service runs between Cambridgeport and North Station at least every 15 minutes from 6 am to 8 pm, with more frequent service during peak travel periods. On weekends, a truncated route between Lechmere and Kendall Square operates every 20 minutes from 9 am to 9 pm.

Major stops
Stop	Connections/Notes
North Station	MBTA subway: Green (D, E) Orange; MBTA Commuter Rail: Fitchburg, Lowell, Haverhill, Newburyport/Rockport; MBTA bus: 4 Amtrak: Downeaster; MBTA ferry: F10 (at Lovejoy Wharf); Seaport Ferry (at Lovejoy Wharf)
Lechmere	MBTA subway: Green (D, E) (at Lechmere station); MBTA bus: 69, 80, 87, 88
First Street	CambridgeSide
Kendall Square	MBTA subway: Red (at Kendall/MIT station); MBTA bus: 64, 68, 85
University Park	MBTA bus: 1, 47, 64, 70, 83, 91
Cambridgeport	MBTA bus: 47
