= Lechmere Viaduct =

Bridge over the Charles River in Boston

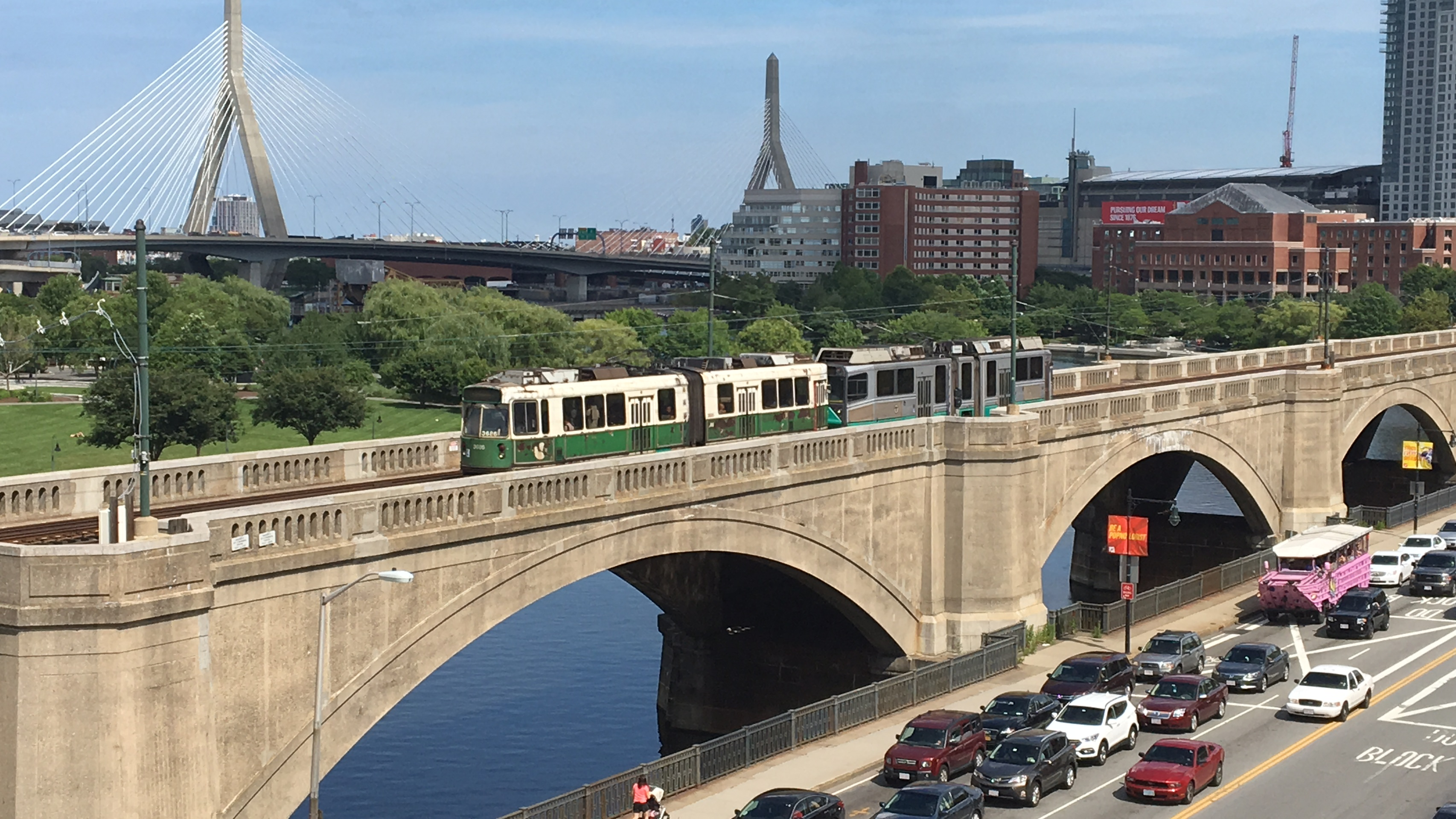
- An inbound train on the Lechmere Viaduct in July 2017
- Coordinates: 42.36803°N 71.07035°W
- Carries: 2 Green Line light rail tracks
- Crosses: Charles River
- Locale: Boston and Cambridge, Massachusetts

Characteristics
- Design: Arch bridge (reinforced concrete and structural steel)
- Total length: 1,700 feet (520 m)
- No. of spans: 12

History
- Construction start: June 20, 1907
- Opened: June 1, 1912

Location
- Interactive map of Lechmere Viaduct

The Lechmere Viaduct is a concrete arch bridge connecting the West End neighborhood of Boston to East Cambridge, Massachusetts. Opened in 1912, the viaduct carries the MBTA's Green Line over the Charles River. It is adjacent to the Charles River Dam Bridge, but structurally separate.

== History ==
=== Construction ===
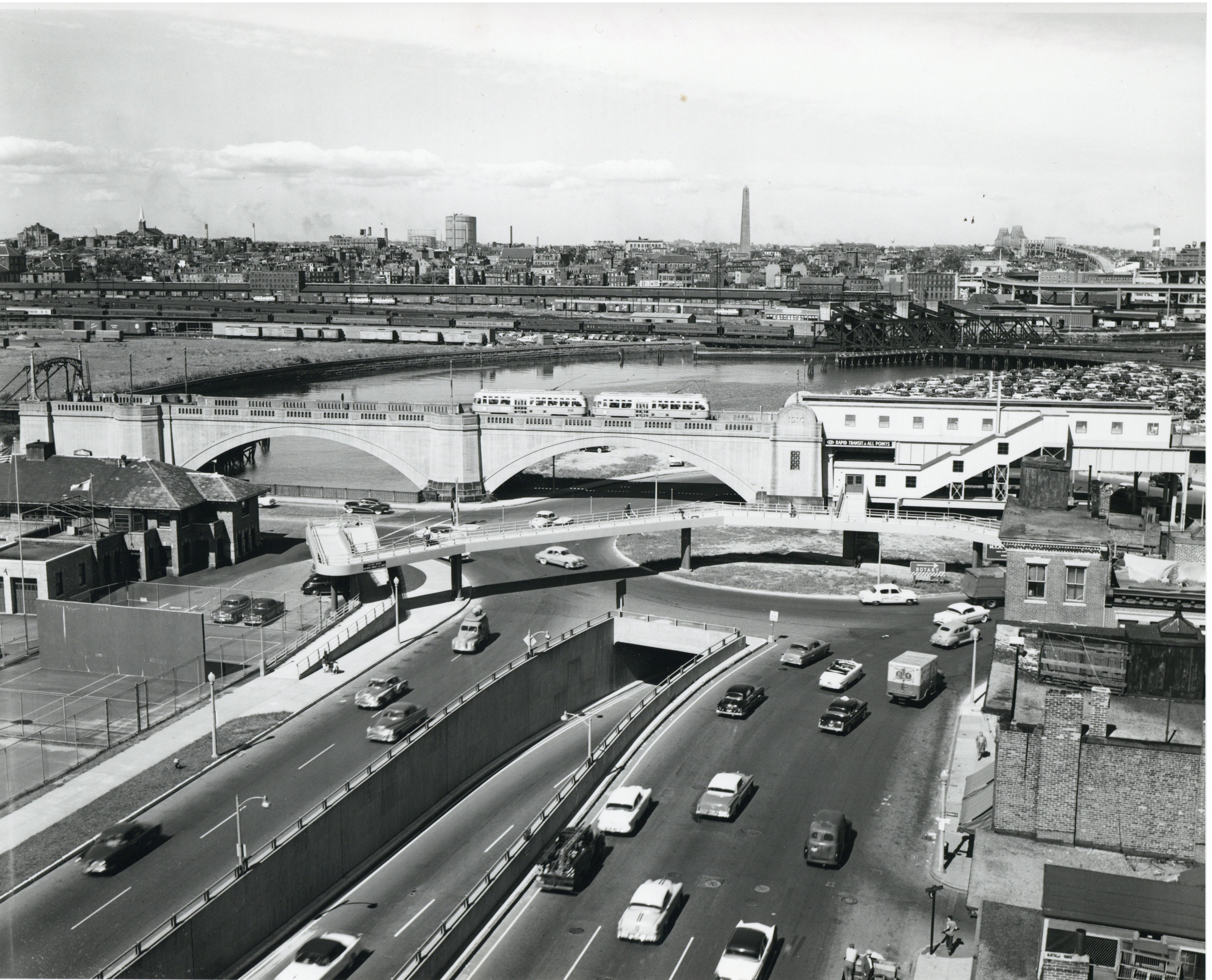
Science Park station just after opening in 1955

When the northern section of the Tremont Street subway opened in 1898, surface cars entering the subway from East Cambridge had to cross Craigie's Bridge and proceed on surface streets to the Canal Street incline. The trip from Lechmere Point over the bridge was slow and prone to delays. On June 20, 1907, construction began on one mile of elevated track connecting the Canal Street incline to East Cambridge. The project's centerpiece was the 12-span, 1,700-foot (520 m)-long viaduct crossing the Charles River. The spans are numbered 1 to 12 from south to north. Ten of the spans are arches; span 3 is a bascule drawbridge over the Charles River channel through the Charles River Dam Bridge, while the span 12 (the northernmost span) is a girder span over the Gilmore Bridge approach.

The viaduct connected to the Causeway Street Elevated on the south (Boston) side of the river, and a short steel elevated section (the Lechmere Elevated) that sloped down to Lechmere Square on the north (East Cambridge) side. The first streetcars crossed the bridge in revenue service on June 1, 1912, shortening the ten-minute trip from Lechmere Square to the subway to just three minutes. The building of the massive structure was done entirely by the Boston Elevated Railway (BERy), without use of subcontractors.

The BERy opened Lechmere station on July 10, 1922, as a transfer point between the Cambridge streetcars and the subway cars. This prevented traffic delays affecting the surface cars from propagating into the subway, and allowed the underground service to use three-car trains, which were too long for safe street-running. In 1935, a citizen's group proposed to widen the viaduct into a four-lane expressway to accommodate an extension of the Mohawk Trail; transit service would have been rerouted into a new parallel subway.

On August 20, 1955, the MTA opened Science Park station as an infill station on the steel approach span of the viaduct over Leverett Circle, just south of the southernmost arch span. It serves the Boston Museum of Science and the West End.

=== Service disruptions and rehabilitation ===
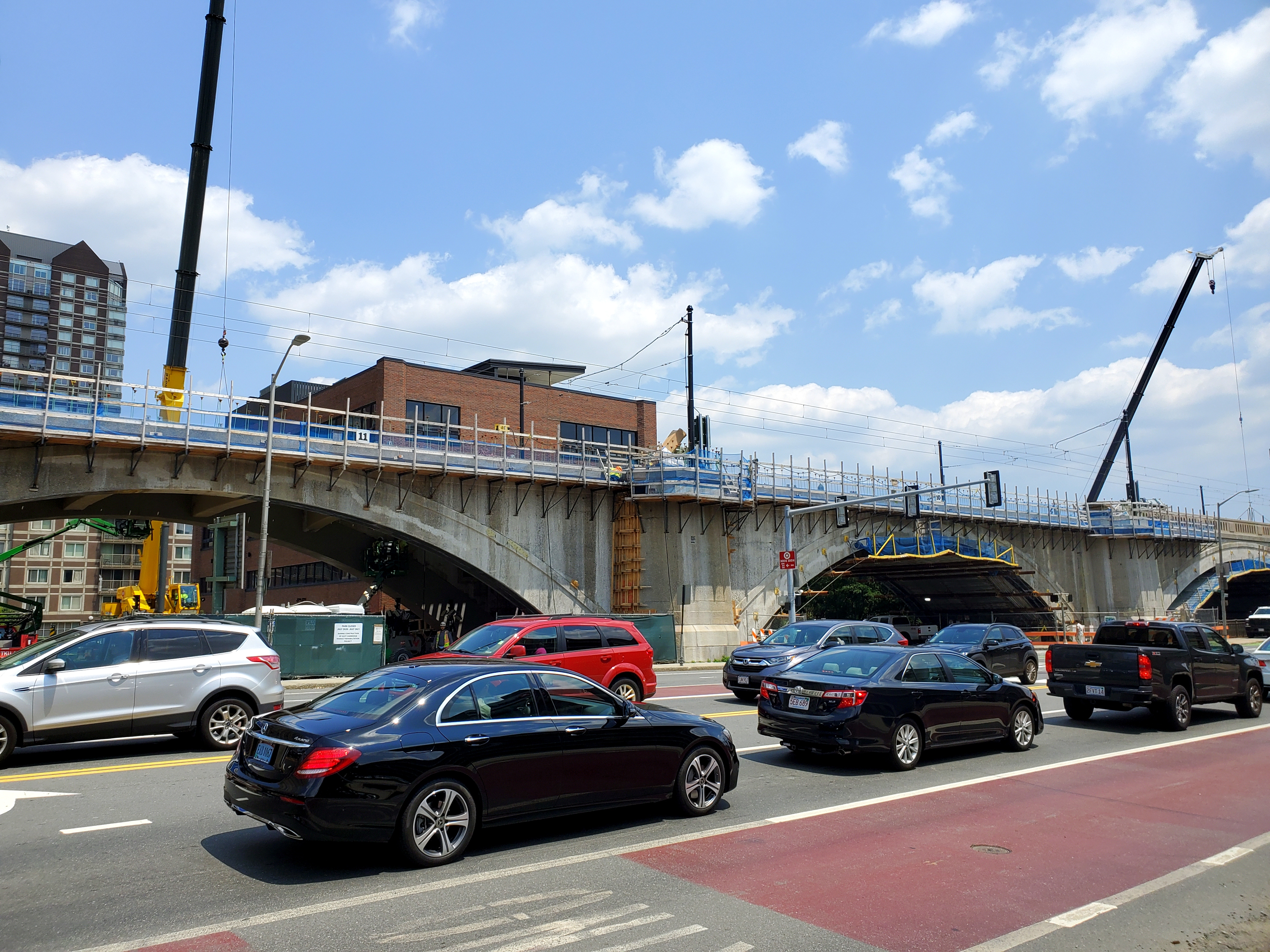
Rehabilitation work in July 2021

On June 25, 2004, service over the viaduct was suspended as the Causeway Street Elevated was removed, and the surface and elevated platforms at North Station were consolidated into a new underground "superstation". This left the Lechmere Viaduct and Lechmere Elevated as the sole remaining elevated lines in Boston. A new portal was built off Martha Road, with a new concrete bridge connecting to the viaduct just south of Science Park station. Service to Lechmere resumed on November 12, 2005. The incline from the 2005-built tunnel to the Lechmere Viaduct is the steepest grade on the entire MBTA subway system. The viaduct was again closed from April 30 to November 4, 2011, as Science Park station was rebuilt with accessible platforms and new elevators.

As part of the Green Line Extension project, the northern section of the Lechmere Elevated was removed and connected to a new elevated structure east of Route 28. The original Lechmere station was replaced with an elevated station on the new structure. The viaduct was closed (with service cut back to North Station) on May 24, 2020, with reopening then expected in April 2021. Demolition of the northern section of the Lechmere Viaduct began on June 6, 2020. Only the steel section of the viaduct north of the Gilmore Bridge was replaced; the main concrete span was restored to support Green Line Extension service and future Type 10 vehicles. By July 2021, the rehabilitation project was 83% complete; track and signal work were complete, power work nearly complete, and concrete repairs under way. Substantial completion was reached on March 16, 2022.

Only the E branch service used the viaduct at the time of its 2020 closure; the B, C, and D branches terminated in downtown Boston. With the Green Line Extension complete, the D and E branches run across the viaduct: the E branch to Medford/Tufts, and the D branch to Union Square. Service over the viaduct resumed with the opening of the Union Square Branch on March 21, 2022. The Union Square Branch was closed from August 22 to September 18, 2022. The closure allowed for wire replacement on the Lechmere Viaduct, increasing speeds from 10 miles per hour (16 km/h) to 25 miles per hour (40 km/h), as well as final integration of the Medford Branch and other work. However, the work did not have the intended effect, and a multi-year long slow-zone was put in place that continued to limit speeds to 10 miles per hour (16 km/h). This slow zone was removed during 2023, as shown by the TransitMatters Data Dashboard.
