= Leverett Circle =

Road junction in Boston, Massachusetts, USA

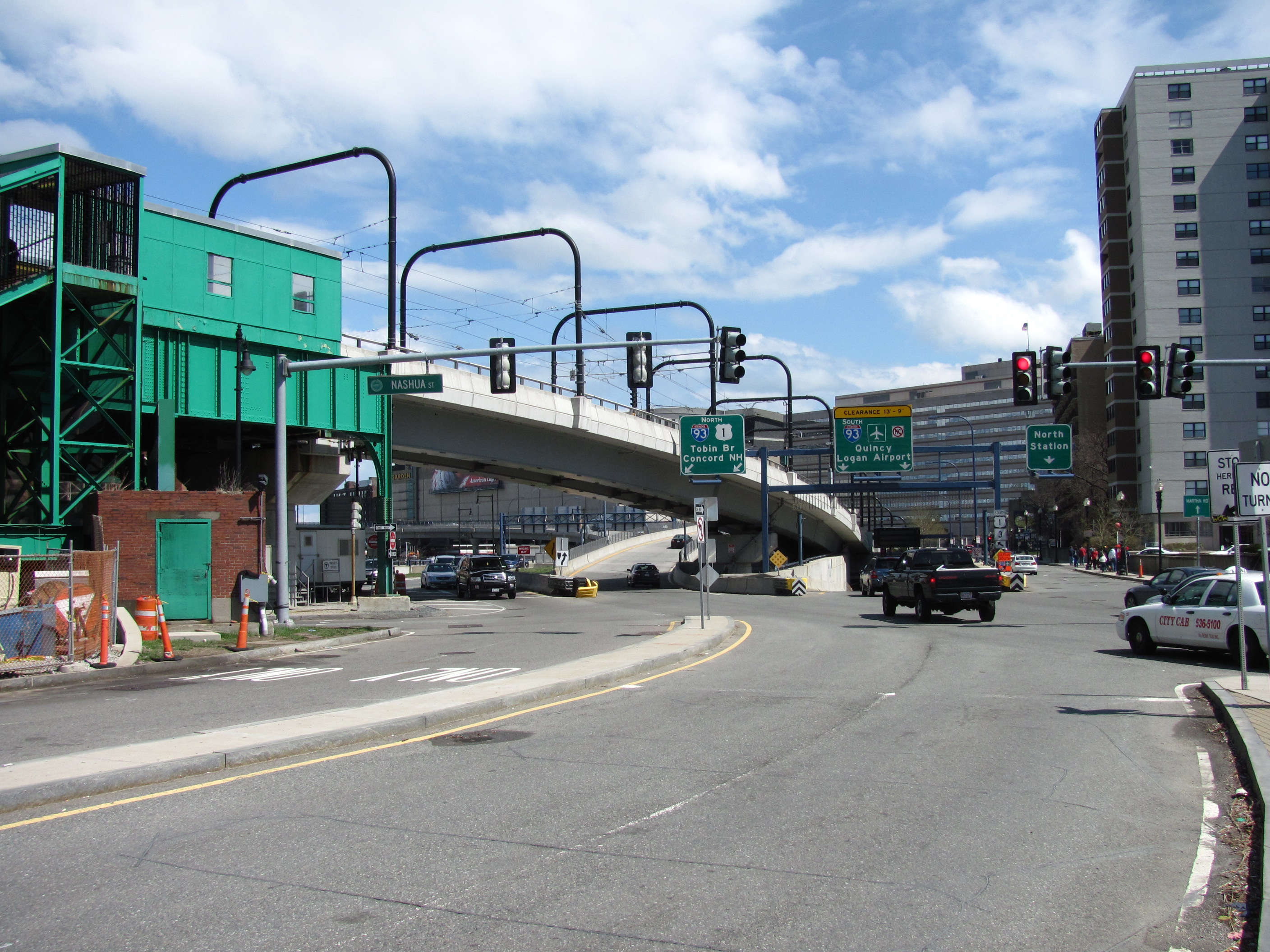
- Leverett Circle after the Big Dig in 2010. At left of photo, Science Park station was undergoing a complete renovation.
- Interactive map of Leverett Circle

Location
- Boston, Massachusetts
- Coordinates: 42.366689°N 71.068118°W
- Roads at junction: Storrow Drive; Charles River Dam Road; Nashua Street; Charles Street; Martha Road; Leverett Circle Connector Bridge

Construction
- Maintained by: MassDOT

Leverett Circle is an intersection in Boston, Massachusetts, United States. Completely rebuilt during the Big Dig, it is no longer a rotary. It marks the confluence of Storrow Drive, Charles River Dam Road (Northern Artery), Nashua Street, Charles Street, and Martha Road.

== Background ==
The Leverett Circle Connector Bridge also terminates here, and has a direct bypass in both directions connecting it directly with Storrow Drive. It provides an onramp to Interstate 93 northbound and an offramp from I-93 southbound. A direct onramp is available to Interstate 93 southbound, into the Thomas P. O'Neill Jr. Tunnel.

Massachusetts Route 3 passes from the tunnel onto Storrow Drive. Massachusetts Route 28 passes from Charles River Dam Road onto Storrow Drive.

Science Park station of the MBTA Green Line is located at Leverett Circle.

== See also ==
- Massachusetts Rehabilitation Hospital (original Spaulding building)
- Lechmere Viaduct
- Mugar Omni Theater
- Museum of Science (Boston)
- Nashua Street Jail
- List of crossings of the Charles River
