= Lynch Family Skatepark =

Skate park in Cambridge, Massachusetts, US

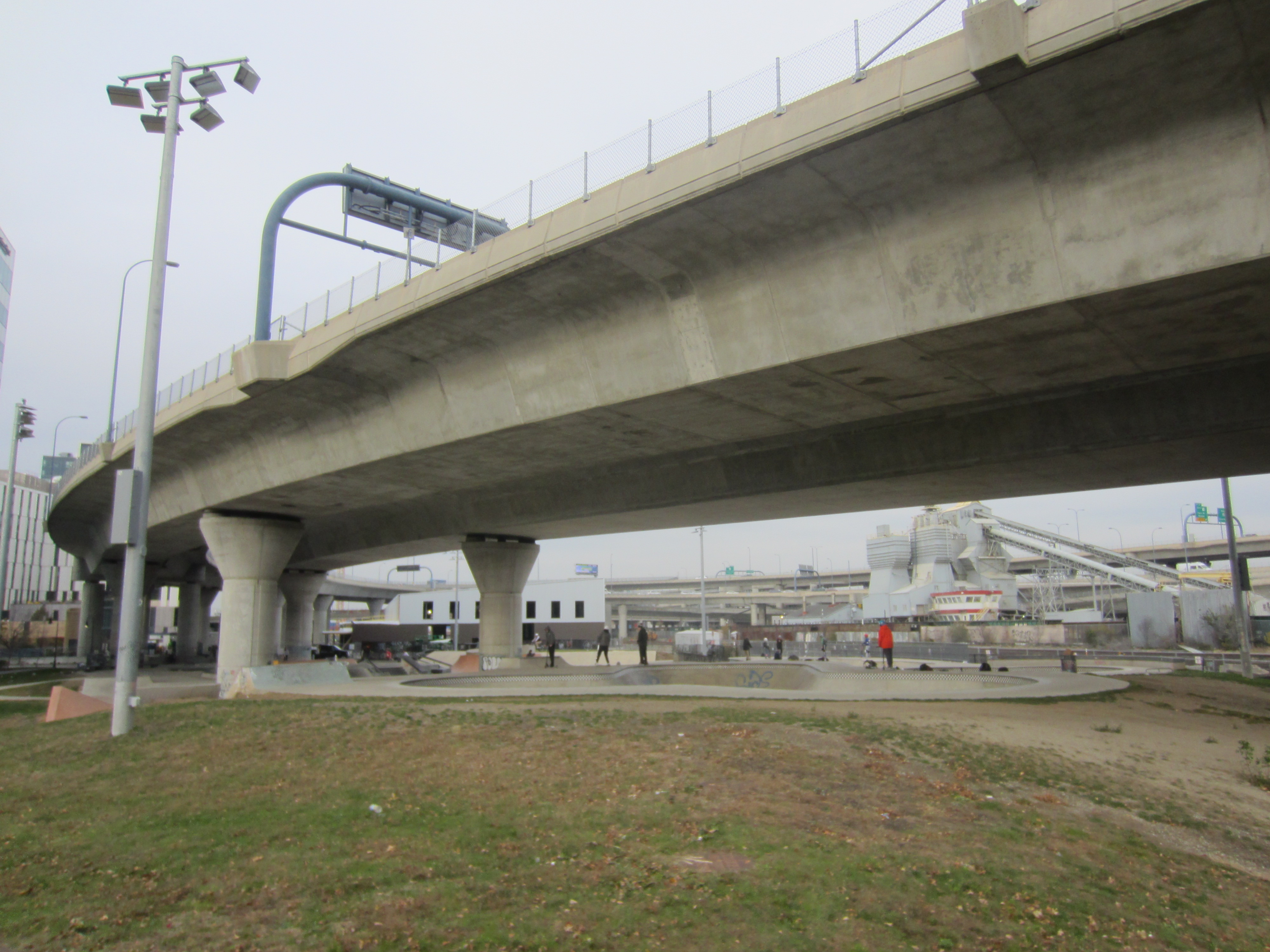
- The skatepark in 2019
- Interactive map of Lynch Family Skatepark
- Type: Skatepark
- Location: Cambridge, Massachusetts
- Coordinates: 42°22′12.30″N 71°4′4.58″W
- Operator: Department of Conservation and Recreation

Lynch Family Skatepark is a skate park operated by the Department of Conservation and Recreation located in Cambridge, Massachusetts. Built on land that was originally used for the Big Dig, the park has found support from Nancy Schon, who found her tortoise and hare sculptures being used in Copley Square by skateboarders who had nowhere else to practice.
