= Charles River Dam Bridge =

Bridge in Boston, Massachusetts

- An EZRide bus on the bridge in 2025 with the Lechmere Viaduct behind
- Coordinates: 42.3680°N 71.0708°W
- Carries: six lanes of traffic ( Route 28), two sidewalks, 2 protected bike lanes
- Crosses: Charles River at mile 1.0
- Locale: Boston, Massachusetts
- Maintained by: Massachusetts Department of Conservation and Recreation
- ID number: 160134

Characteristics
- Design: steel bascule bridge
- Total length: 25.0 m (82.0 ft)
- Width: 25.6 m (84.0 ft)
- Longest span: 19.2 m (63.0 ft)
- Clearance below: 4.6 m (15 ft)

History
- Opened: 1910

Location
- Interactive map of Charles River Dam Bridge

The Charles River Dam Bridge, officially the Craigie Bridge, also called Craigie's Bridge or the Canal Bridge, is a six-lane bascule bridge across the Charles River in the West End neighborhood of Boston. The bridge, maintained by the Massachusetts Department of Conservation and Recreation (DCR, formerly the MDC), carries Massachusetts Route 28 (Charles River Dam Road at this location) next to the Green Line's Lechmere Viaduct. The Museum of Science is located on the dam and nearby piers. Charles River Dam Road connects Leverett Circle in the West End to East Cambridge, but most of the road is fixed, and the asymmetrically sited drawbridge is a short span entirely on the Boston side of the river.

The original lock for the Charles River was incorporated into the dam, just west of the Charles River Dam Bridge, but it was replaced by three parallel locks in the new Charles River Dam, located further east, at the site of the old Warren Bridge.

The former lock at the Charles River Dam Bridge now allows water and small ships to flow freely. Taller ships require the opening of the drawbridge, operated by the Massachusetts Department of Transportation.

== History ==
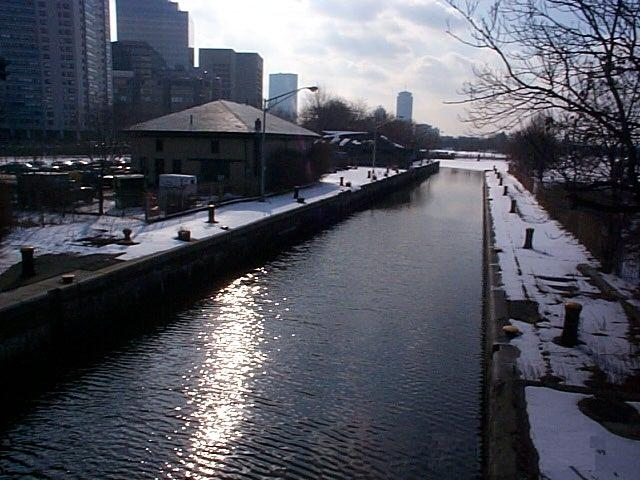
The original lock for the Charles River adjacent to the bridge

The first bridge on the site was known as the Canal Bridge, named after the Middlesex Canal which ran from the Charlestown Mill Pond to Middlesex Village in East Chelmsford Massachusetts; later p/o Lowell. As an investment, businessman Andrew Craigie purchased the largely undeveloped farmland on the Cambridge side around Lechmere Point from various owners (including Mary Lechmere and heirs) in preparation for building the bridge. The investors incorporated in 1807 with a charter to build a bridge from Leverett Street in the West End, Boston to the eastern end of Lechmere Point. One-third of shares were owned by the Middlesex Canal Corporation.

The bridge opened in 1809, and came to be known as Craigie's Bridge. The construction of the bridge prompted the laying out of roads to the center of Cambridge (now Cambridge Street, running to Harvard Square) and Somerville/Medford (Bridge Street, now Monsignor O'Brien Highway/Massachusetts Route 28). Craigie and associates, who formed the Lechemere Point Corporation, benefited from the building boom that followed, spurred on by their efforts to expand the public street grid. Residential cross streets were constructed and some were named after investors (Otis, Thorndike, and Gore).

The bridge was sold to the Hancock Free Bridge Corporation in 1846, and became toll-free on January 30, 1858.

The current bridge was constructed in 1910, along with the dam that turned the lower Charles River from a tidal estuary into a fresh-water basin. This reduced the problematic odor from raw sewage flowing into the river by keeping the formerly tidal lands covered with water. It was completed on June 30, and greeted with a two-hour fireworks display that Fourth of July. Thousands of people watched from the new Boston Embankment (the early Charles River Esplanade), which took the place of the former tidal flats.

Construction of the Museum of Science began on the dam in 1948, and finished in 1951.

The Massachusetts Department of Transportation completed a 2-year project to rehabilitate the Craigie Bridge and to completely replace the drawbridge in 2011. The project required the closure of the Boston-bound lanes from November 6, 2010, through mid December 2010, and again from early February 2011 through mid-April 2011, necessitating traffic detours. This was paid for out of borrowed funds as part of the statewide Accelerated Bridge Program.

In November 2018, a Boston University graduate student was killed by a dump truck while bicycling on the bridge as both turned right onto Museum Way. The next month, MassDOT announced that dedicated bicycle signals and protected bicycle lanes would be added in summer 2019, dropping automobile traffic to two lanes in each direction.

== Gallery ==
An orange Duck Boat headed toward the bridge. From foreground to background are the operations tower (right), drawbridge (green), the Lechmere Viaduct, Interstate 93, and the Bunker Hill Monument.

Duck Boat passing underneath

Eastbound traffic and eastbound Green Line train

The bridge with an iconic yellow Duck Boat headed eastbound in traffic. MBTA Lechmere Viaduct is in the background.

A painted warning sign on the sidewalk where the gates stop pedestrian traffic when the drawbridge is raised.

This height gauge, slightly upstream, gives the clearance from the river surface to the bottom of the drawbridge (when closed) and the MBTA Green Line Lechmere Viaduct bridge (which is fixed) when the drawbridge is open. The Museum of Science is in the background.

An iconic orange Duck Boat heads eastbound over the drawbridge as an MBTA Green Line train heads westbound on the separate Lechmere Viaduct. In the distance, the Bunker Hill Monument can be seen behind traffic on Interstate 93 and the trees of Richard McKinnon Park in Cambridge.

== See also ==
- List of crossings of the Charles River
