= East Somerville station =

Light rail station in Somerville, Massachusetts, US

East Somerville
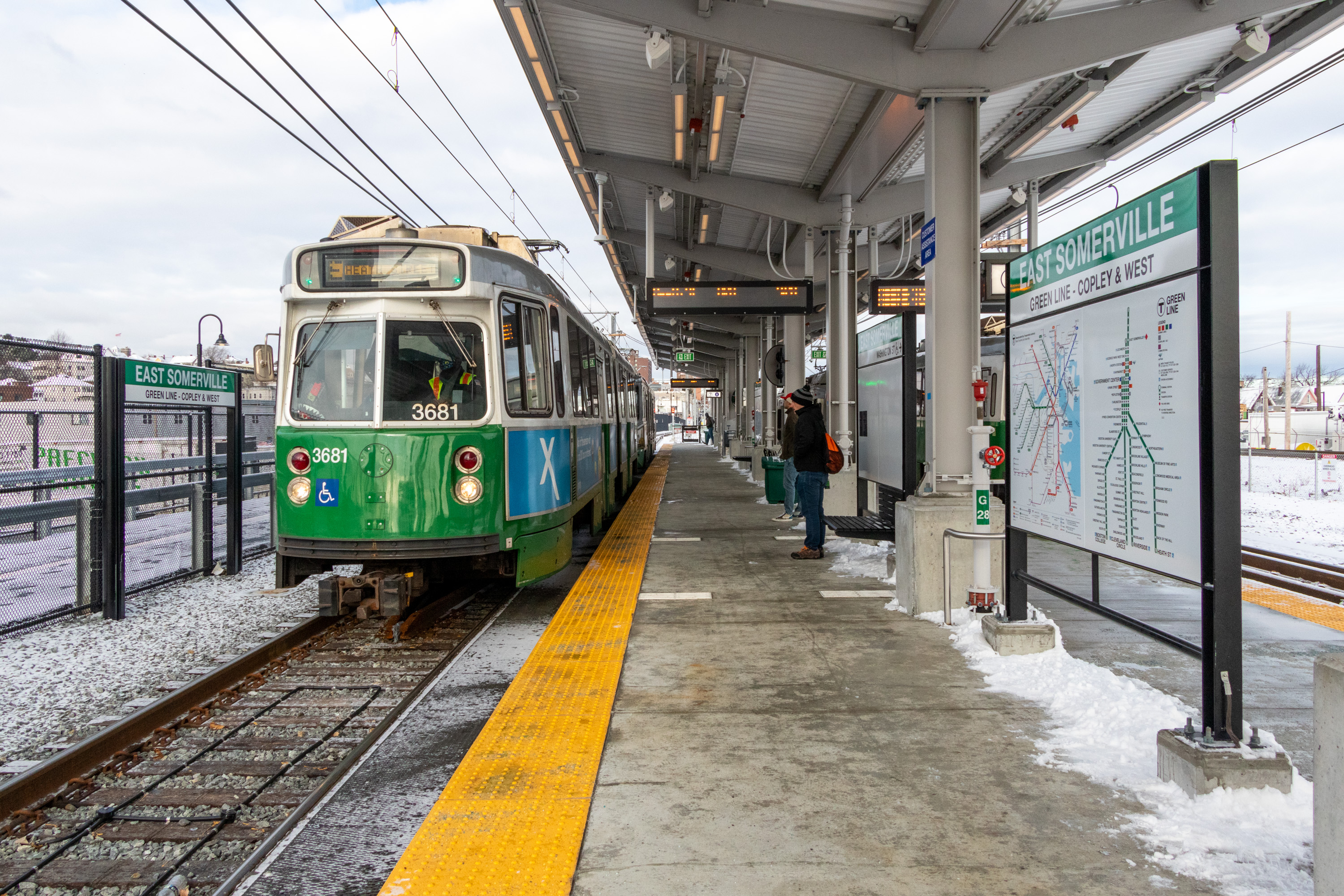
- An inbound train at East Somerville station in December 2022

General information
- Location: Washington Street at Joy Street; Somerville, Massachusetts
- Coordinates: 42°22′47″N 71°05′13″W
- Line: Medford Branch
- Platforms: 1 island platform
- Tracks: 2
- Connections: MBTA bus: 85, 91, 109

Construction
- Cycle facilities: 52-space "Pedal and Park" bicycle cage 20 spaces on racks
- Accessible: Yes

History
- Opened: December 12, 2022

Passengers
- 2030 (projected): 2,730 daily boardings

Services
Preceding station	MBTA	Following station
Gilman Square toward Medford/Tufts	Green Line E branch	Lechmere toward Heath Street
Former services (Prospect Hill station)
Preceding station	Boston and Maine Railroad	Following station
Winter Hill toward Concord, NH	Boston – Concord, NH	East Cambridge toward Boston
Winter Hill toward Lowell or Reformatory	Lexington Branch	East Cambridge toward Boston
Winter Hill toward Northampton	Central Mass Branch	East Cambridge toward Boston
Location

East Somerville station is a light rail station on the Massachusetts Bay Transportation Authority (MBTA) Green Line located in southeastern Somerville, Massachusetts. The accessible station has a single island platform serving the two tracks of the Medford Branch. It opened on December 12, 2022, as part of the Green Line Extension (GLX), which added two northern branches to the Green Line, and is served by the E branch.

The location was previously served by railroad stations. The Boston and Lowell Railroad (B&L) opened a station at Milk Row in the mid-19th century; it was replaced with Prospect Hill station in the 1880s. The station was served by the Boston and Maine Railroad, successor to the B&L, until 1927. Extensions to the Green Line were proposed throughout the 20th century, most with Washington Street as one of the intermediate stations. A separate station in the Brickbottom neighborhood was rejected in 2008 during planning. By 2011, the planned station at Washington Street was renamed Brickbottom.

The MBTA agreed in 2012 to open the station by 2017, and a construction contract was awarded in 2013. Cost increases triggered a wholesale reevaluation of the GLX project in 2015. A scaled-down station design was released in 2016, with the station renamed to East Somerville later that year. A design and construction contract was issued in 2017. Construction of East Somerville station began in early 2020 and was largely completed by late 2021.

== Station design ==
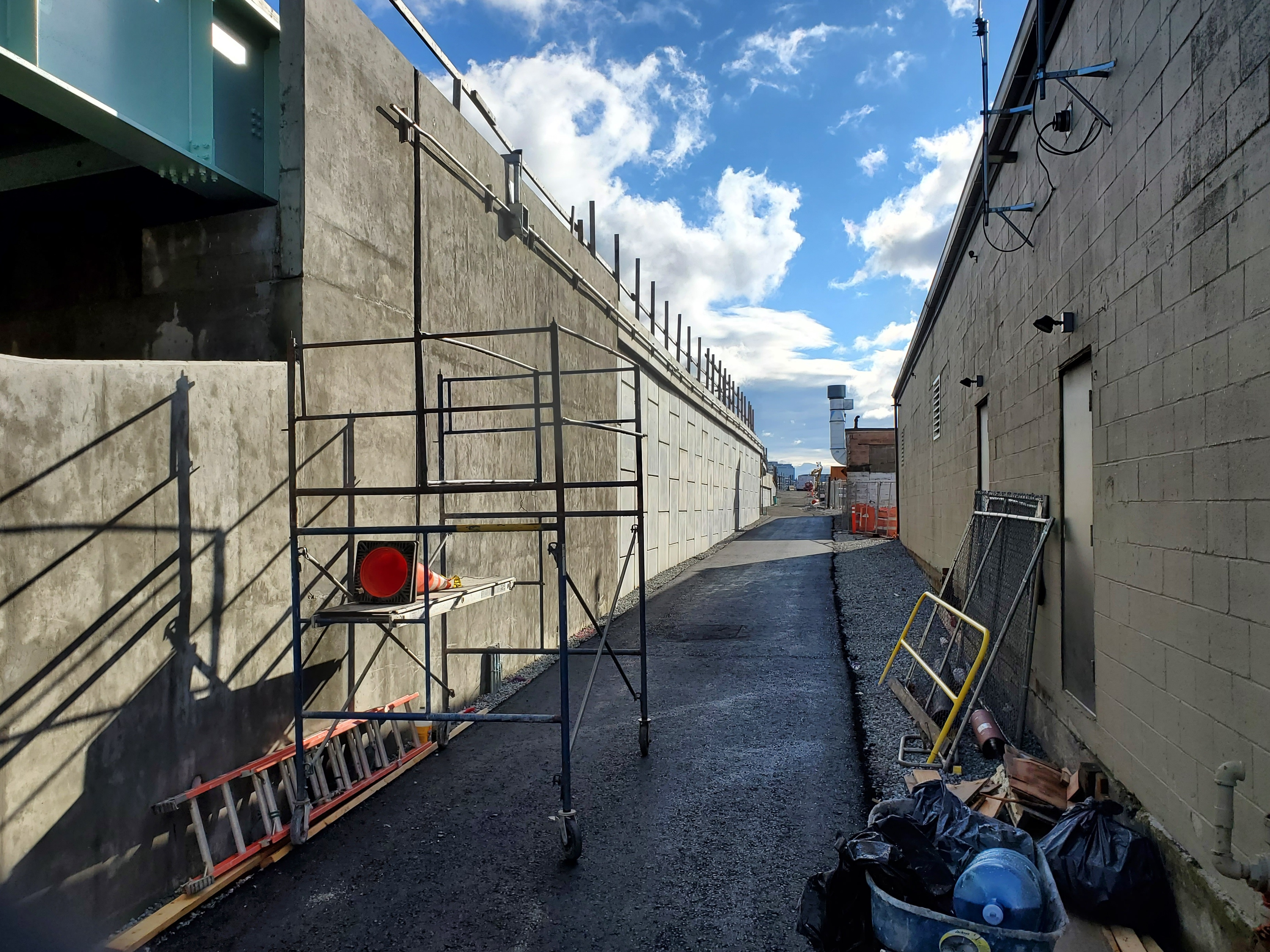
The ramp from Washington Street under construction in 2021

East Somerville station is located in the southeast part of Somerville, with East Somerville to the northeast, the Inner Belt District to the southeast, Brickbottom to the south, and Union Square to the west. The station is located on an embankment about 500 feet (150 m) south of Washington Street and 700 feet (210 m) east of the McGrath Highway. The Medford Branch runs north–south at the station, with two tracks serving a single island platform. The Lowell Line joins the Medford Branch from the east near the station and parallels it to the north. The Somerville Community Path parallels the west side of the Medford Branch through the station area.

The station's island platform is 225 feet (69 m) long and 20 feet (6.1 m) wide, and is located between the Green Line tracks. A canopy covers the full length of the platform. The platform is 8 inches (200 mm) high for accessible boarding on current light rail vehicles (LRVs), and can be raised to 14 inches (360 mm) for future level boarding with Type 9 and Type 10 LRVs. It is also provisioned for future extension to 300-foot (91 m) length. The station entrance is at a small plaza at the south end of the platform, with a level crossing of the southbound track. A ramp from the eastbound Washington Street sidewalk meets the Community Path at the track-level entrance plaza.

A "Pedal and Park" bike cage with space for 52 bikes, along with racks for 20 bikes, are located at the entrance plaza. A small utility building is between the tracks just south of the entrance, behind fare vending machines. An emergency exit to the Community Path is located at the north end of the platform. Domino Frame, In Tension, an aluminum foam sculpture by Nader Tehrani, is located at the station entrance.

== History ==
=== Railroad station ===
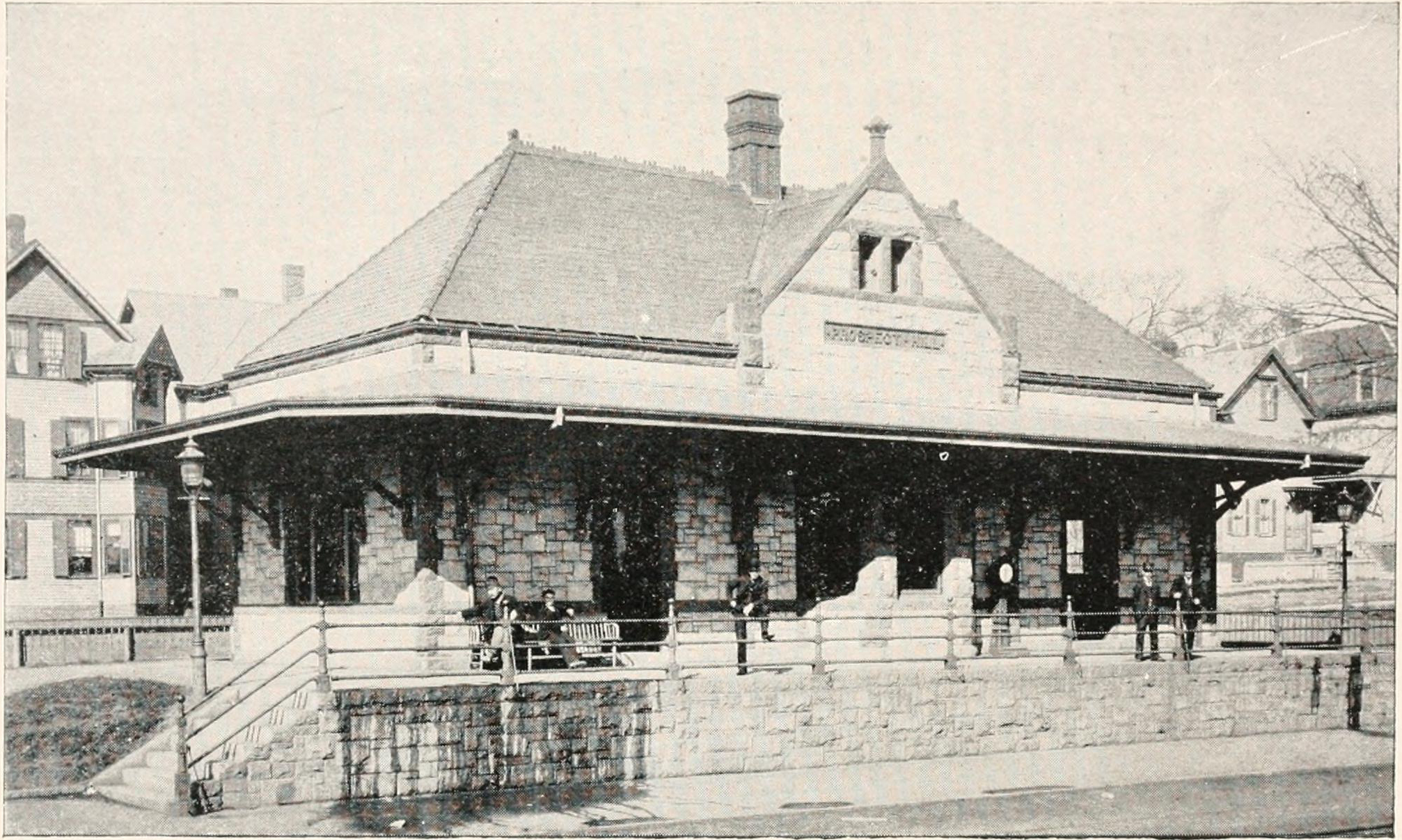
Prospect Hill station in 1897

The Boston and Lowell Railroad (B&L) opened between its namesake cities in 1835. Passenger service initially ran express between the two cities, but local stops were soon added. One of the first was Milk Row, just south of Washington Street (then known as Milk Row after the nearby farms). Later sources claim it opened in 1835, making it the first railroad station in Somerville (which separated from Charlestown in 1842), though more likely it opened in the late 1840s. (Note: The station does not appear in 1838 or 1847 station listings; it does appear in 1849 and later guides. Woburn Branch local trains made flag stops at Charles Tufts' estate on Alston Street, slightly north of Milk Row, by 1846.) All grade crossings on the line in Somerville were eliminated by 1852; the railroad passed over Washington Street on a bridge. The railroad bridge was raised and a longer embankment built in 1862 as Washington Street was lowered, widened, and paved.

In 1870, the Lexington Branch was routed over the B&L east of Somerville Junction, increasing service to Somerville Junction, Winter Hill, Milk Row, and East Cambridge stations. The Massachusetts Central Railroad (later the Central Massachusetts Railroad) began operations in 1881 with the Lexington Branch and B&L as its Boston entry. The B&L began construction of a new station off Alston Street, slightly to the north of Milk Row, in June 1886. The new station, Prospect Hill, opened on May 16, 1887. The Boston and Maine Railroad (B&M) acquired the B&L in 1887. The former Milk Row station building remained extant but unused until at least 1895.

The Prospect Hill station building was disused by 1924 as passenger volumes dwindled, though trains continued to stop. In 1926, the Boston and Maine Railroad (B&M) began work on North Station plus an expansion of its freight yards. The B&M soon proposed to abandon East Cambridge and Prospect Hill stations in order to realign the ex-B&L into the new North Station. Although the closure of East Cambridge was protested, Prospect Hill had largely been replaced by streetcars to Lechmere station and its closure was unopposed. The Public Utilities Commission approved the closures in March 1927. The stations closed at some point between then and May 22, when trains were rerouted over the new alignment. The bridge over Washington Street was rebuilt as part of the realignment project. The former station building remained in disuse until at least 1933, but was later demolished.

=== Green Line Extension ===
==== Previous plans ====
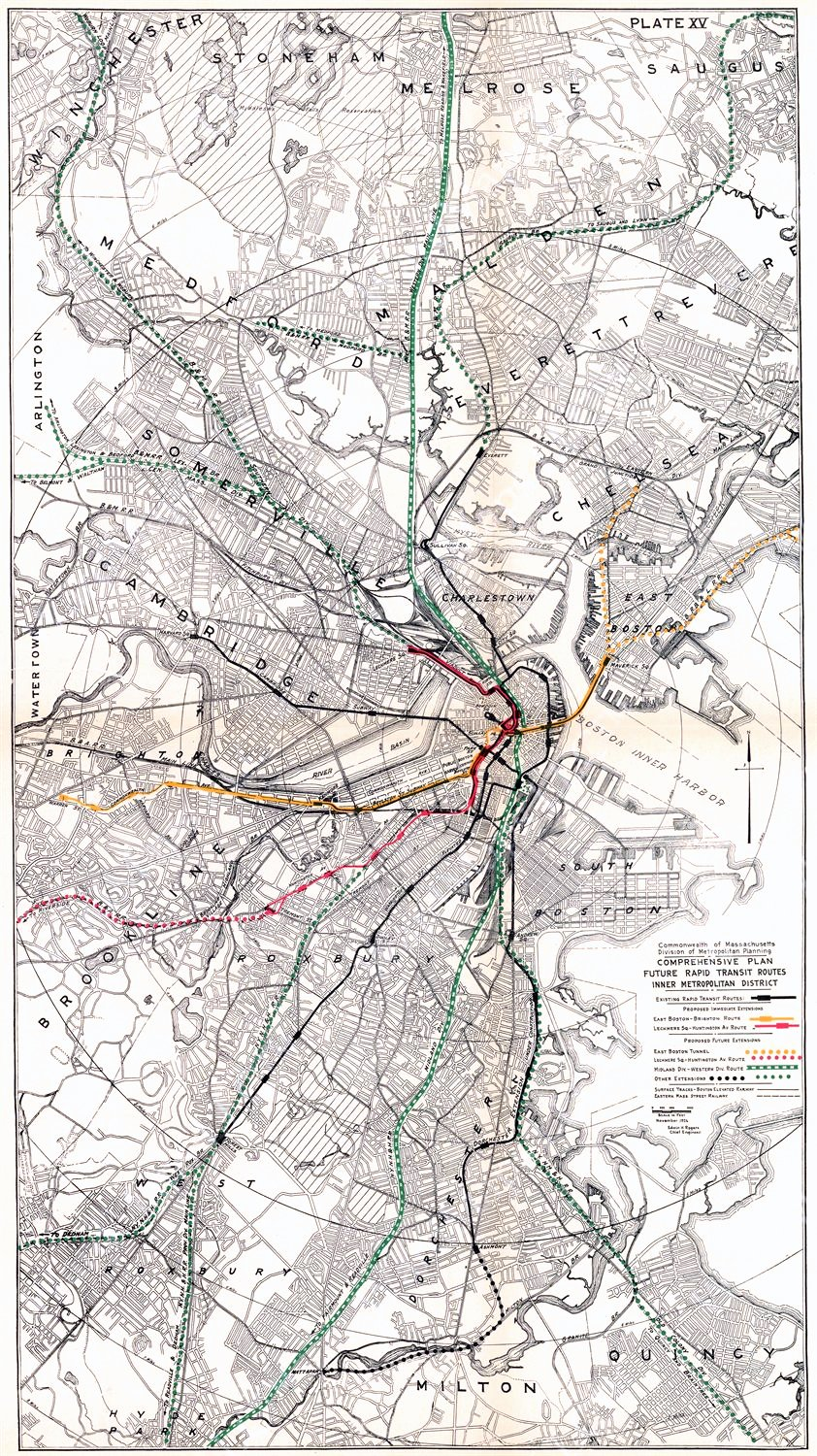
Map showing the 1926-proposed extensions northwest from Lechmere (at left)

The Boston Elevated Railway (BERy) opened Lechmere station in 1922 as a terminal for streetcar service in the Tremont Street subway. That year, with the downtown subway network and several radial lines in service, the BERy indicated plans to build three additional radial subways: one paralleling the Midland Branch through Dorchester, a second branching from the Boylston Street subway to run under Huntington Avenue, and a third extending from Lechmere Square northwest through Somerville. The Report on Improved Transportation Facilities, published by the Boston Division of Metropolitan Planning in 1926, proposed extension from Lechmere to North Cambridge and beyond via the Southern Division and the 1870-built cutoff. Washington Street, just south of Prospect Hill station, was to be the site of an intermediate station in this and subsequent plans.

In 1945, a preliminary report from the state Coolidge Commission recommended nine suburban rapid transit extensions – most similar to the 1926 plan – along existing railroad lines. These included an extension from Lechmere to Woburn over the Southern Division, again with Washington Street as an intermediate stop. The 1962 North Terminal Area Study recommended that the elevated Lechmere–North Station segment be abandoned. The Main Line (now the Orange Line) was to be relocated along the B&M Western Route; it would have a branch following the Southern Division to Arlington or Woburn.

The Massachusetts Bay Transportation Authority (MBTA) was formed in 1964 as an expansion of the Metropolitan Transit Authority to subsidize suburban commuter rail service, as well as to construct rapid transit extensions to replace some commuter rail lines. In 1965, as part of systemwide rebranding, the Tremont Street subway and its connecting lines became the Green Line. The 1966 Program for Mass Transportation, the MBTA's first long-range plan, listed an approximately 1-mile (1.6 km) extension from Lechmere to Washington Street as an immediate priority. New Hampshire Division (Southern Division) passenger service would be cut back from North Station to a new terminal at Washington Street. A second phase of the project would extend Green Line service from Washington Street to Mystic Valley Parkway (Route 16) or West Medford.

The 1972 final report of the Boston Transportation Planning Review listed a Green Line extension from Lechmere to Ball Square as a lower priority, as did several subsequent planning documents. In 1980, the MBTA began a study of the "Green Line Northwest Corridor" (from Haymarket to Medford), with extension past Lechmere one of its three topic areas. Extensions to Tufts University or Union Square were considered.

==== Station planning ====
In 1991, the state agreed to build a set of transit projects as part of an agreement with the Conservation Law Foundation (CLF), which had threatened a lawsuit over auto emissions from the Central Artery/Tunnel Project (Big Dig). Among these projects was a "Green Line Extension To Ball Square/Tufts University", to be complete by the end of 2011. No progress was made until an updated agreement was signed in 2005. The Beyond Lechmere Northwest Corridor Study, a Major Investment Study/alternatives analysis, was published in 2005. The analysis studied a variety of light rail and bus rapid transit extensions; the three highest-rated alternatives all included an extension to West Medford with Washington Street as one of the intermediate stations.

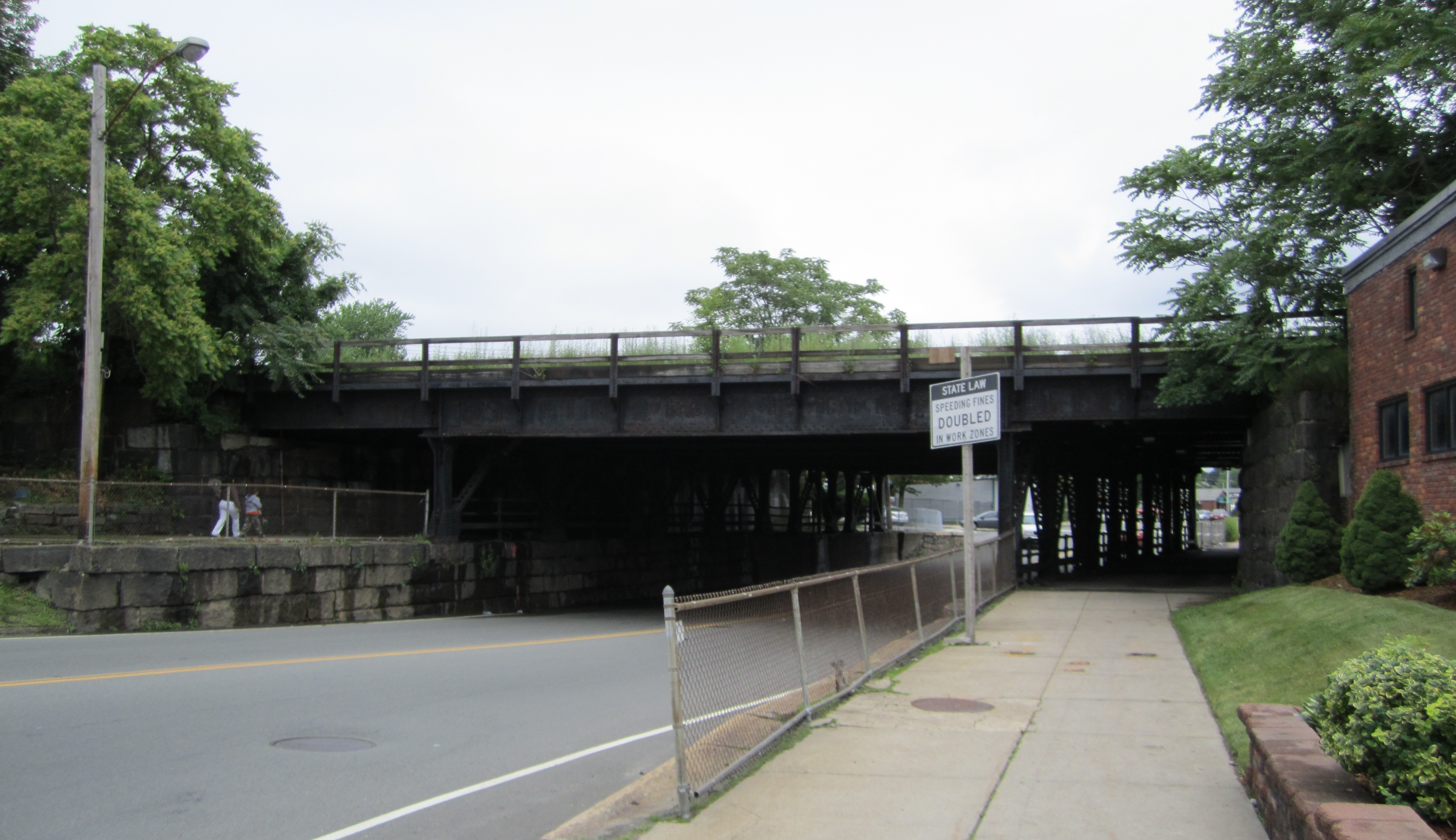
The railroad bridge over Washington Street in 2011, at which time the station entrance was planned to be under the bridge

The Massachusetts Executive Office of Transportation and Public Works submitted an Expanded Environmental Notification Form (EENF) to the Massachusetts Executive Office of Environmental Affairs in October 2006. The EENF identified a Green Line extension with Medford and Union Square branches as the preferred alternative. That December, the Secretary of Environmental Affairs issued a certificate that required analysis of a Brickbottom/Twin Cities Plaza station in the draft environmental impact report (DEIR) for the Green Line Extension (GLX). Plans shown in early 2008 included both a Washington Street station north of its namesake and a Brickbottom station north of Fitchburg Street.

However, in May 2008, the MBTA announced plans to build a single Brickbottom station south of Washington Street, which would be less costly than two stations and reduce travel time. Locating the station south of Washington Street would allow for future entrances from Joy Street or Inner Belt Road to support proposed redevelopment. The DEIR, released in October 2009, also noted that the single station would have nearly the same ridership as the two stations combined. Preliminary plans in the DEIR called for the station entrance to be off Joy Street, with the lobby partially under the west (southbound) track. The Somerville Community Path extension was to be elevated over the station headhouse to cross over to the east side of the tracks.

Updated plans shown in May 2011 moved the platform northwards, with the entrance from Washington Street rather than Joy Street. By that time, the station name had been changed to Washington Street as well. Plans presented in February 2012 moved the platform back south, with an elongated headhouse connecting to Washington Street. The Community Path was moved to track level, with a tunnel under the tracks south of the platform. A further update in June 2013 removed a mechanical penthouse and modified the lobby designs. In September 2013, MassDOT awarded a $393 million (equivalent to $535 million in 2025), 51-month contract for the construction of Phase 2/2A – Lechmere station, the Union Square Branch and Union Square station, and the first segment of the Medford Branch to Washington Street – with the stations to open in early 2017. Design of the station was completed in late 2014.

==== Redesign ====
In August 2015, the MBTA disclosed that project costs had increased substantially, with Phase 2A rising from $387 million to $898 million. This triggered a wholesale re-evaluation of the GLX project. In December 2015, the MBTA ended its contracts with four firms. Construction work in progress continued, but no new contracts were awarded. At that time, cancellation of the project was considered possible, as were elimination of the Union Square Branch and other cost reduction measures.

In May 2016, the MassDOT and MBTA boards approved a modified project that had undergone value engineering to reduce its cost. Stations were simplified to resemble D branch surface stations rather than full rapid transit stations, with canopies, faregates, escalators, and some elevators removed. The headhouse was eliminated from Washington Street station, with the entrance instead to be a ramp from Washington Street. The Community Path extension was also cut back, with Washington Street to be its southern end. Several elements of the reduced-cost project design were criticized by community advocates and local politicians. E. Denise Simmons criticized the scaled-down station designs at Union Square and East Somerville for having long ramps rather than elevators, saying they were not sufficient for accessibility.

In December 2016, the MBTA announced a new planned opening date of 2021 for the extension, as well as a name change from Washington Street station to East Somerville station. A design-build contract for the GLX was awarded in November 2017. The winning proposal included six additive options – elements removed during value engineering – including full-length canopies at all stations. Station design advanced from 0% in March 2018 to 23% that December and to 95% in October 2019.

==== Construction and opening ====
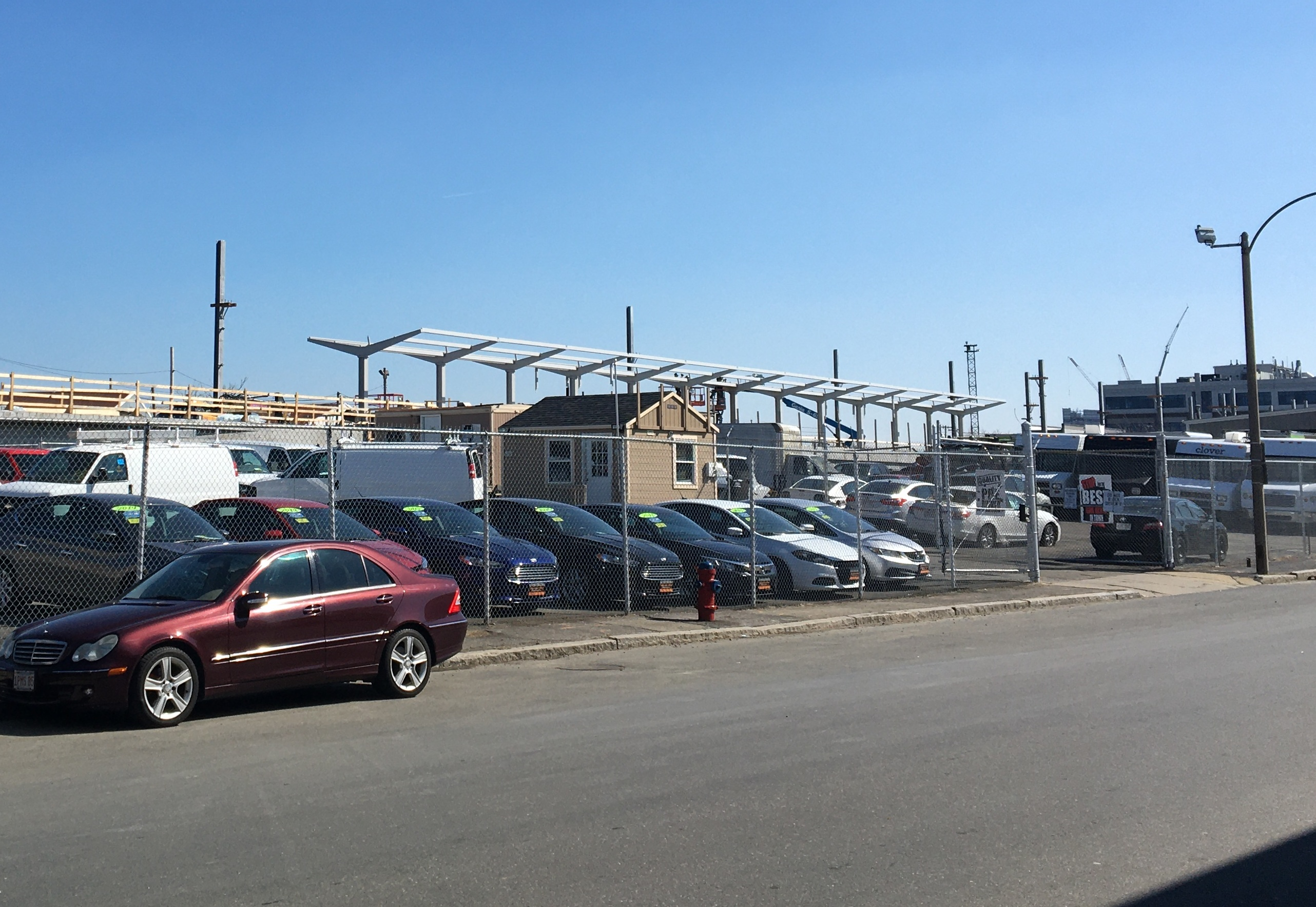
The station under construction in March 2021

As part of the Green Line Extension, the nearly-century-old rail bridge over Washington Street was rebuilt to accommodate the Community Path, two Green Line tracks, two Lowell Line tracks, and a freight bypass track. This required the closure of Washington Street between Joy Street and Tufts Street, including the diversion of MBTA bus routes 86, 91, and CT2. Washington Street was closed on April 8, 2019. The first steel was placed on August 24, 2019. Original plans called for two separate closures in 2019 and 2020 for the two halves of the bridge; it was instead decided to combine these into a single closure. Washington Street reopened on May 31, 2020, though bridge and sidewalk work continued for the rest of the year. Among the drainage improvements included in the GLX project was a new pump station at Washington Street to mitigate flooding issues related to the former Millers River.

Construction work on the station itself began by April 2020. The concrete station platform was poured that August. During construction, an old flatcar was found buried near the station site. Steelwork for the canopy began in November 2020, while the canopy itself was installed in March 2021. Original plans called for the D Branch to be extended to Medford/Tufts. However, in April 2021, the MBTA indicated that the Medford Branch would instead be served by the E Branch. By March 2021, the station was expected to open in December 2021. In June 2021, the MBTA indicated an additional delay, under which the station was expected to open in May 2022. In February 2022, the MBTA announced that the Medford Branch would open in "late summer". Train testing on the Medford Branch began in May 2022. In August 2022, the planned opening was delayed to November 2022. The Medford Branch, including East Somerville station, opened on December 12, 2022.

By 2023, the MBTA planned to connect the station with the Inner Belt neighborhood to the east, initially with an at-grade crossing at the station and later with a footbridge near Poplar Street to the south. A tentative settlement with an adjacent landowner, reached that year as part of a property acquisition for expansion of the nearby Green Line yard, was to allow those connections to be built. An Inner Belt road entrance with an at-grade crossing opened on May 2, 2025. The MBTA also added floating bus stops at New Washington Street in November 2024. As of 2025, the city is considering various configurations of a footbridge or replacement at-grade crossing. A 2024 city plan for the Brickbottom neighborhood also proposed a commuter rail station at East Somerville.
