= Inner Belt District =

Industrial district in Somerville, Massachusetts

Coordinates: 42°22′39″N 71°4′51″W

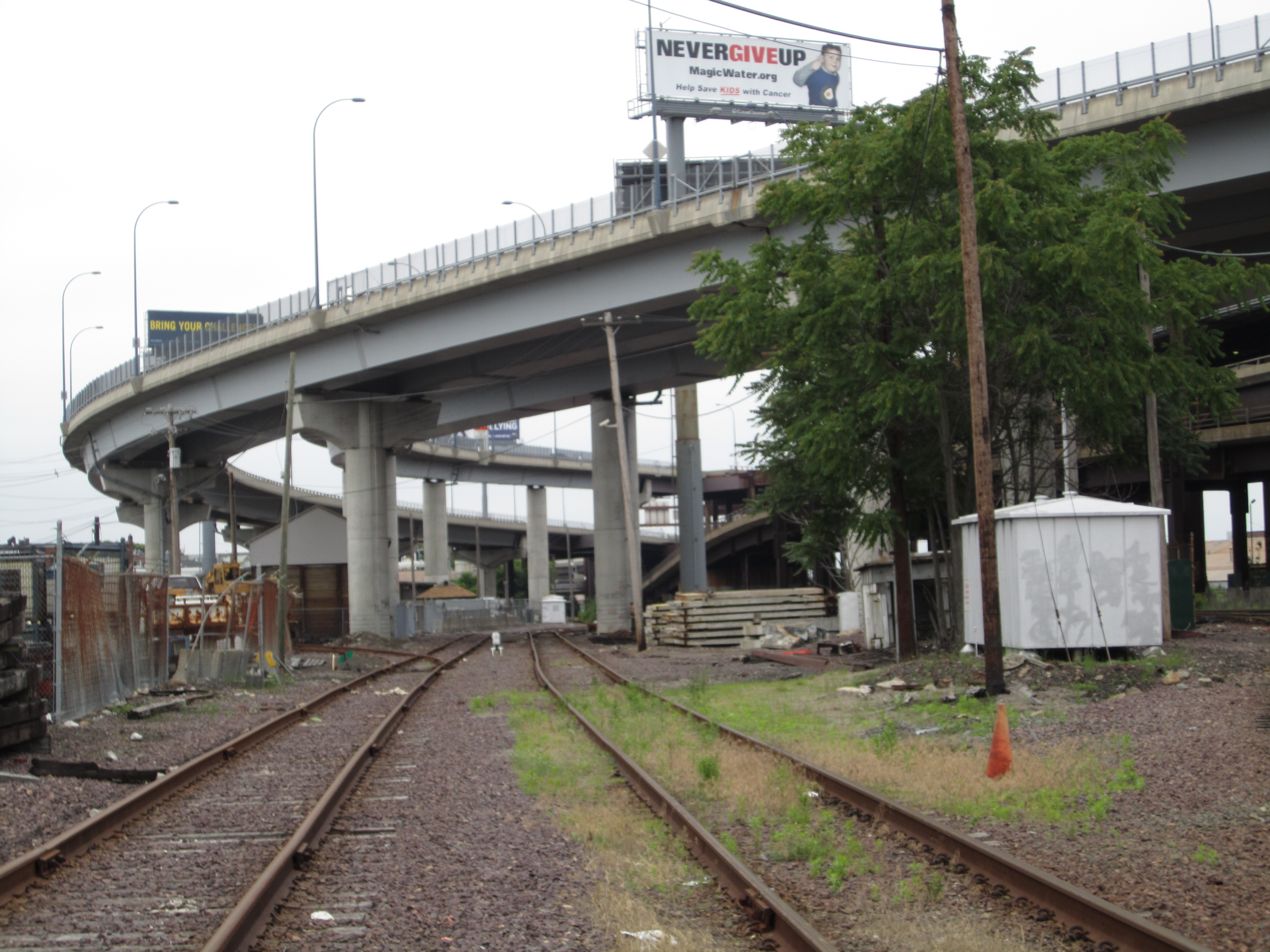
Interstate 93 over rails. Inner Belt area.

The Inner Belt District is a 126-acre (0.51 km^{2}) industrial district located in the southeastern portion of Somerville, Massachusetts, United States. Along with nearby Brickbottom, the Inner Belt is a historically industrial zone of Somerville, with factories, warehouses, distribution centers, railroad connections, regional maintenance facilities, MBTA and Amtrak offices, retail stores and a hotel.

Named after the proposed but doomed Inner Belt Highway, the district is bounded by Interstate 93, Route 28, and the Lowell and Fitchburg rail lines. Inner Belt Road runs through the center of the Inner Belt District, intersecting with 3rd Avenue to connect to the MBTA maintenance facility. Although adjacent to the McGrath Corridor, NorthPoint in Cambridge and Sullivan Square in Charlestown, it is isolated from them by highways and rail lines.

An elevated railroad right-of-way separates the Brickbottom area located to the west of the Inner Belt District. The two areas resemble each other in terms of use. However, Brickbottom has older dense development in a grid pattern and has a couple of small neighborhoods.

== History ==
Like many areas in today's modern cities, the Inner Belt District bears little resemblance to what the area looked like when it was first being settled. The area was primarily marshland and the Miller's River, which has since been filled in, flowed along the southern edge. As industry began to enter into the area in the early- to mid-1800s, the landscape was changed to suit the needs of new businesses. Cobble Hill was brought down and used to fill in the marshes. Miller's River was used first by the new industries to discharge their pollutants, and was eventually filled as well.

By the 1930s, the whole sub-district, with the exception of the strip of land between Washington Street and what is now New Washington Street, was completely taken over by the Boston and Maine Railroad. The remaining portion of land south of Washington Street was used for heavy industry that was rail dependent. In the late 1940s, freight transportation began to shift away from rail to the open roads and once-valuable rail yards were slowly removed to make way for new industrial uses. A new industrial park was planned for the Yard 10 in the space between what is now New Washington Street and the Lowell Line.

By the mid-1950s, a new regional expressway called the Inner Belt was planned that would bisect the site between the older industrial buildings on Washington Street and the new industrial buildings on the former Yard 10 land. Called the Inner Belt Expressway, it would have connected I-93 on the east with Massachusetts Route 2 in the west following the path of the Fitchburg Railroad through Porter Square. After years of protest and community organizing, plans for the Inner Belt Expressway were withdrawn and the right of way that is now New Washington Street was transferred to the city.

Although the Inner Belt was stopped, housing in the Brickbottom neighborhood and the adjacent neighborhood to its east between the MBTA Lowell Line and I-93 was cleared in the 1950s for an urban renewal plan to create a Somerville Industrial Park that would benefit from the anticipated highway network. The purpose of the renewal plan was to destroy the existing neighborhood grid pattern and reorganize the area to accommodate the Interstate, provide automobile circulation and parking, and establish single-use zoning.

With the anticipation of the Inner Belt, the Inner Belt District was advertised in a real estate booklet as a "unique parcel [which] combines the advantages of a suburban type development and a downtown location." The assets of the area that were marketed to potential investors remain the area's strong points: accessibility, proximity to Boston and the region, auto-designed roads, and a large workforce nearby. In 1968, the Somerville Redevelopment Authority created an Urban Renewal District for the land between Washington and New Washington streets.

During the mid-1980s to the late 1990s, little significant development influenced the area. Like many U.S. cities, industrial and manufacturing companies left the area, to be replaced by primarily service businesses. The Kraft Group discussed the possibility of building a soccer stadium for the New England Revolution in the district in 2008.

On May 1, 2025, a new pedestrian and bicycle connection opened between the end of Inner Belt Road and East Somerville station on the MBTA Green Line Extension, which had opened in December 2022. As of 2026, the city of Somerville was planning to add a pedestrian and bicycle connection across the Green Line tracks at Poplar Street, to provide a direct connection to the Brickbottom neighborhood.
