= Woburn station =

Railroad station in Woburn, Massachusetts

Woburn
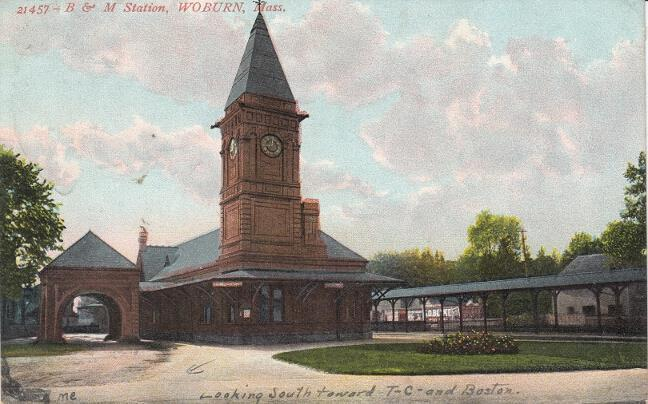
- 1908 postcard of Woburn station

General information
- Location: Pleasant Street at Woburn Common (until 1959); Main Street at Summer Street (1959–1981); Woburn, Massachusetts
- Coordinates: 42.47885°N 71.152748°W (until 1959); 42.476784°N 71.149932°W (1959–1981)
- Owner: Massachusetts Bay Transportation Authority
- Line: Woburn Branch
- Platforms: 2
- Tracks: 2

Other information
- Fare zone: 2

History
- Opened: 1844
- Closed: 1981

Former services
Preceding station	MBTA	Following station
Terminus	Lowell Line Woburn Branch Closed 1981	Cross Street toward North Station
Preceding station	Boston and Maine Railroad	Following station
Central Square toward Concord, NH	Boston – Concord, NH via Woburn Loop until 1959	Woburn Highlands toward Boston
Terminus	Woburn Branch after 1959	Cross Street toward Boston
Location

Woburn station was a railroad station on the Woburn Branch (formerly the Woburn Loop), part of the Massachusetts Bay Transportation Authority's Lowell Line.

== History ==
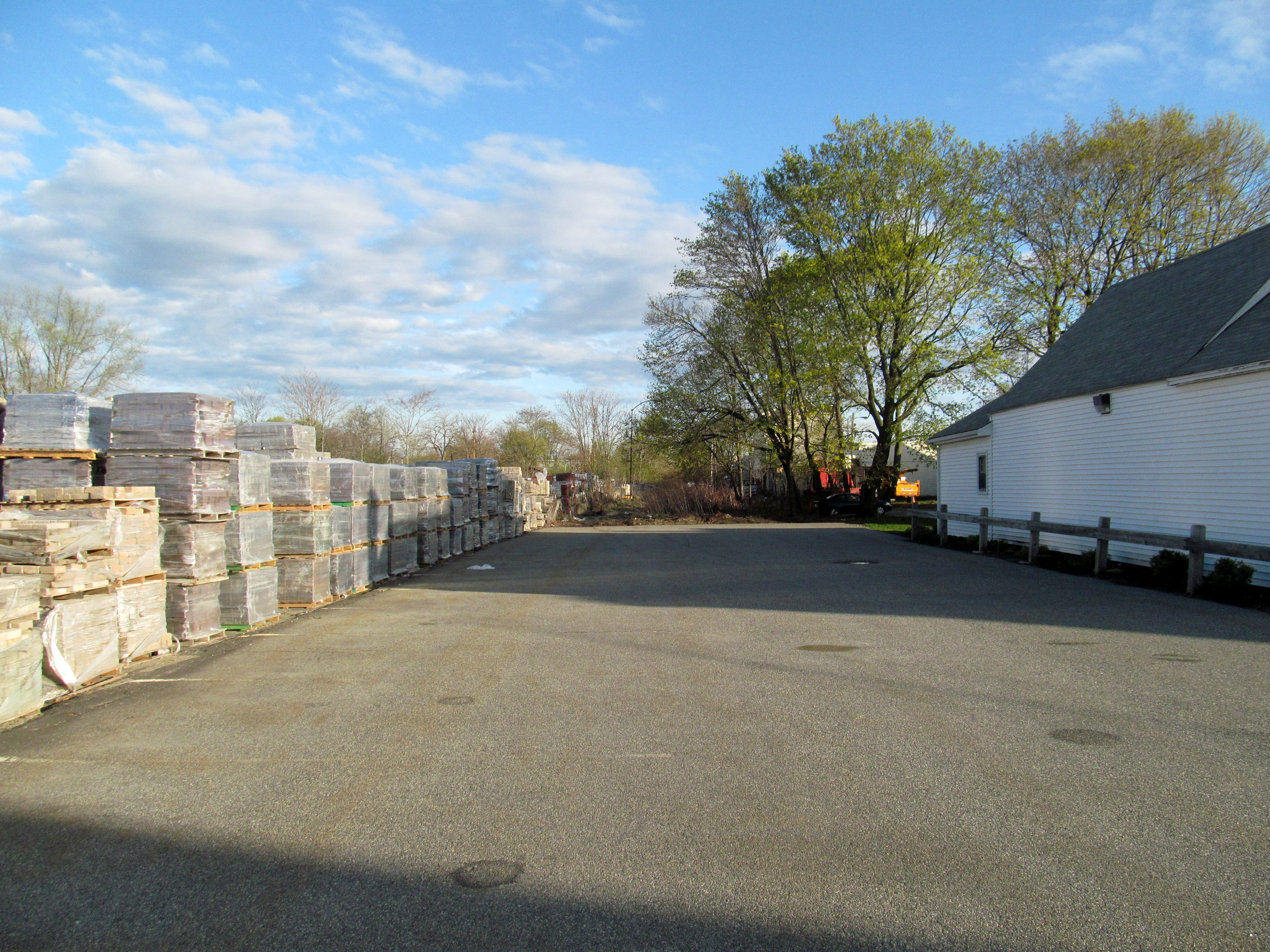
The station site used from 1959 to 1981, seen in 2016

It was closed in 1981 when service on the Woburn Branch was terminated due to poor track conditions and insufficient funding; service north of Woburn station had already been discontinued in June 1959.

After the closure of the Woburn Branch, all trains travelling outbound from North Station on the Lowell Line simply stayed on the main line all the way north to Lowell. The only station on the Lowell Line left in Woburn was Mishawum, a low-capacity station that was only meant to serve the sparsely populated northern neighborhoods of Woburn. The need for a larger station in the city quickly became apparent, so in 2001, the Anderson Regional Transportation Center, signed on MBTA maps as "Anderson/Woburn," was opened. Today, Anderson RTC is the MBTA station with the second-highest number of daily train departures outside of downtown Boston (30), and serves both the Lowell and Haverhill lines, as well as Amtrak trains on the Downeaster service.

Although the northern part of the Woburn Branch within the town of Wilmington (about a mile in length) is still used as an industrial spur to service customers along the line in South Wilmington, and the right-of-way of the entire branch is still owned by the MBTA, the part of the branch within Woburn is abandoned. After its closure, the former station building was destroyed by vandals.
