= Gilman Square station =

Light rail station in Somerville, Massachusetts, US

Gilman Square
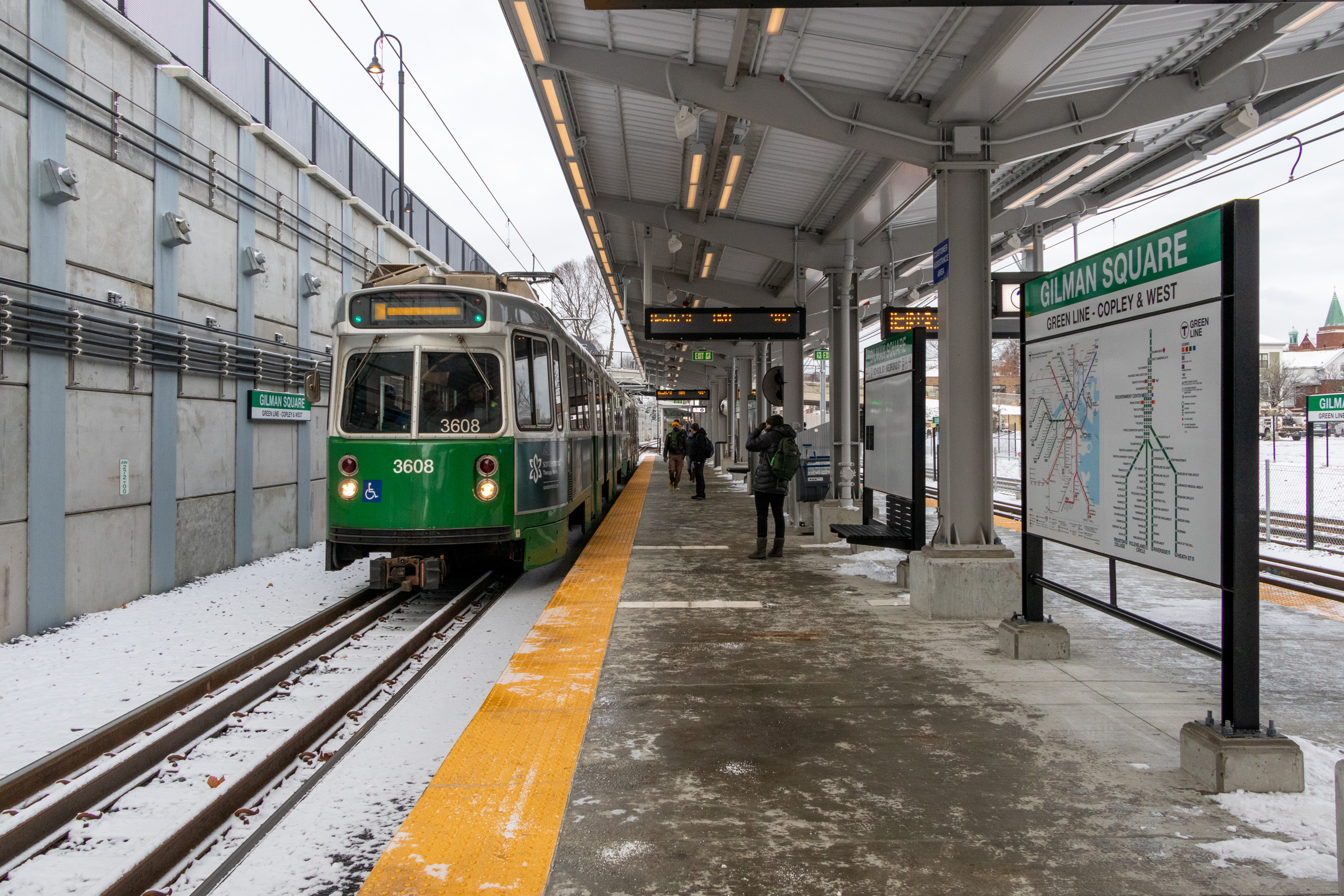
- An inbound train at Gilman Square station, December 2022

General information
- Location: Medford Street at Pearl Street; Somerville, Massachusetts
- Coordinates: 42.38792°N 71.09677°W
- Line: Medford Branch
- Platforms: 1 island platform
- Tracks: 2
- Connections: MBTA bus: 80

Construction
- Cycle facilities: 100-space "Pedal and Park" bicycle cage 40 spaces on racks
- Accessible: Yes

History
- Opened: December 12, 2022

Passengers
- 2030 (projected): 4,410 daily boardings

Services
Preceding station	MBTA	Following station
Magoun Square toward Medford/Tufts	Green Line E branch	East Somerville toward Heath Street
Former services (Winter Hill station)
Preceding station	Boston and Maine Railroad	Following station
Somerville Junction toward Concord, NH	Boston – Concord, NH	Prospect Hill toward Boston
Somerville Junction toward Lowell or Reformatory	Lexington Branch	Prospect Hill toward Boston
Somerville Junction toward Northampton	Central Mass Branch	Prospect Hill toward Boston
Location

Gilman Square station is a light rail station on the Massachusetts Bay Transportation Authority (MBTA) Green Line located at Gilman Square in Somerville, Massachusetts. The accessible station has a single island platform serving the two tracks of the Medford Branch. It opened on December 12, 2022, as part of the Green Line Extension (GLX), which added two northern branches to the Green Line, and is served by the E branch.

The location was previously served by railroad stations. The Boston and Lowell Railroad (B&L) opened a station at Winter Hill in 1863; it was rebuilt in 1886–1888. The station was served by the Boston and Maine Railroad, successor to the B&L, until 1937. Extensions to the Green Line were proposed throughout the 20th century, most with Winter Hill as one of the intermediate stations. A Gilman Square station at the Winter Hill site was officially chosen for the GLX in 2008. Cost increases triggered a wholesale reevaluation of the GLX project in 2015, and a scaled-down station design was released in 2016. A design and construction contract was issued in 2017. Construction of Gilman Square station began in early 2020 and was largely completed by late 2021.

== Station design ==
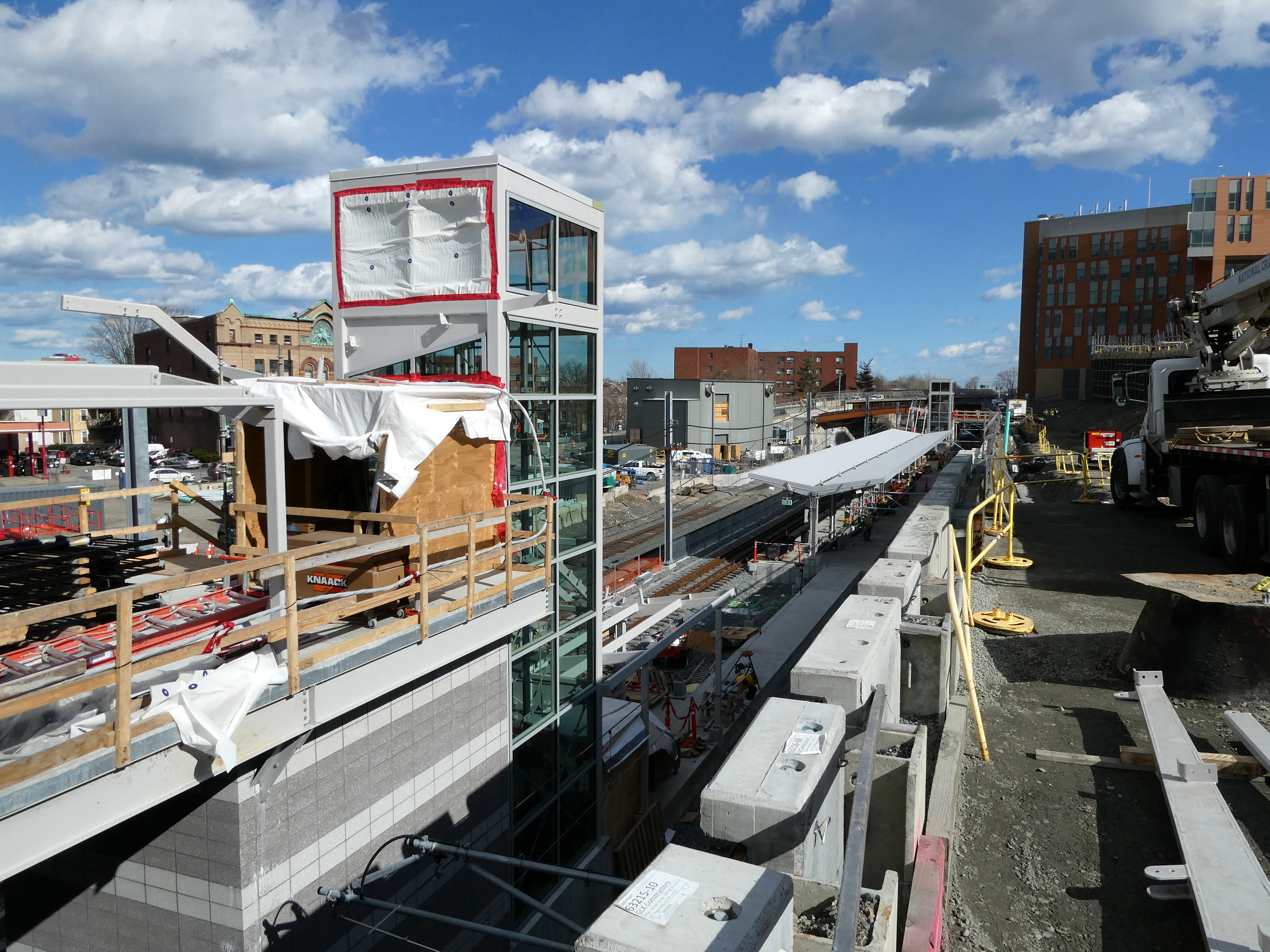
The School Street entrance and the Community Path under construction in 2022

Gilman Square station is located between School Street and Medford Street in the eponymous neighborhood in central Somerville, adjacent to Somerville City Hall and Somerville High School. The Lowell Line runs roughly northwest–southeast through the station area, with the two-track Medford Branch of the Green Line on the south side of the Lowell Line tracks. The station has a single island platform, 225 feet (69 m) long and 20 feet (6.1 m) wide, between the Green Line tracks. A canopy covers the full length of the platform.

The platform is 8 inches (200 mm) high for accessible boarding on current light rail vehicles (LRVs), and can be raised to 14 inches (360 mm) for future level boarding with Type 9 and Type 10 LRVs. It is also provisioned for future extension to 300-foot (91 m) length. The tracks and platform are located below street level.

The Somerville Community Path runs at street level along the south side of the rail lines. There are two entrances: from the School Street bridge at the west end of the platform, and from the Community Path at the east end. Both entrances have stairs and a single elevator for accessibility. A 100-space "Pedal and Park" bike cage and 40 bike racks are located along the Community Path next to the entrance. The Pearl Street Traction Power Substation is located northeast of the station along Medford Street.

== History ==
=== Railroad station ===
The Boston and Lowell Railroad opened between its namesake cities in 1835; local stops were added after several years. Medford Street crossed over the railroad on a bridge by 1852, while a bridge was added in 1856 to extend School Street over the railroad. Winter Hill opened as a stop at Gilman Square in Somerville on January 1, 1863, with a station building added soon after. (Winter Hill Steps had previously been a flag stop on Woburn Branch local trains by 1846.) The original station building was a long wooden structure north of the tracks just west of Medford Street.

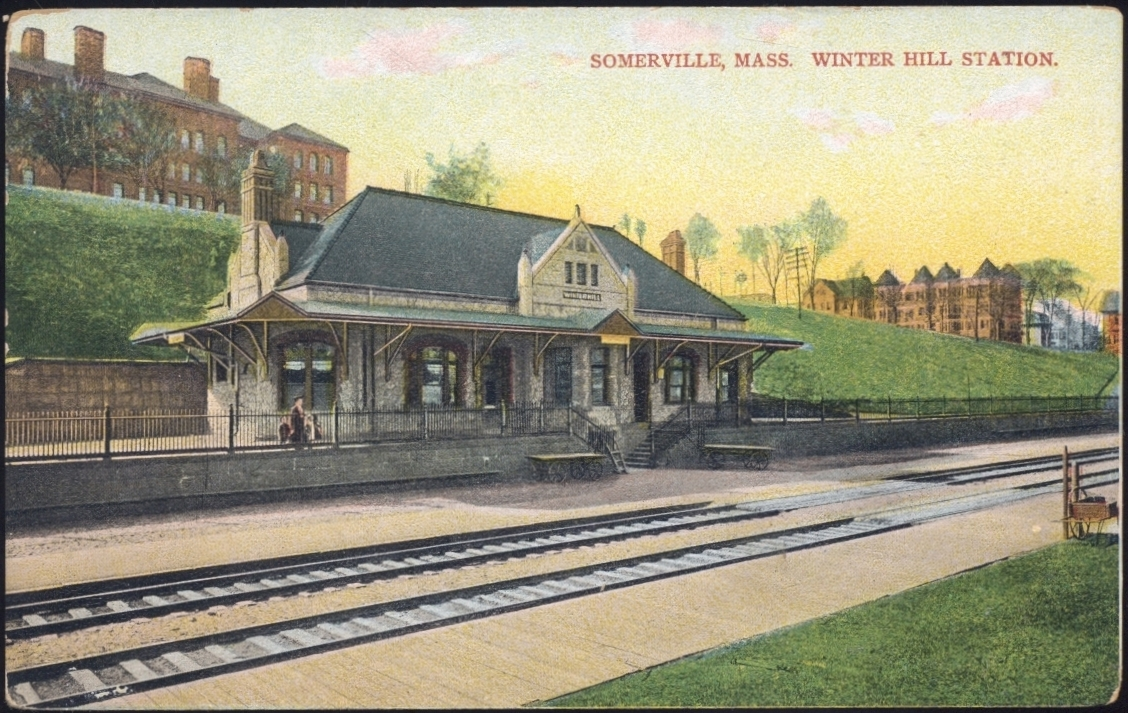
Postcard of the second Winter Hill station

In 1870, the Lexington Branch was routed over the B&L east of Somerville Junction, increasing service to Somerville Junction, Winter Hill, Milk Row, and East Cambridge stations. The Massachusetts Central Railroad (later the Central Massachusetts Railroad) began operations in 1881 with the Lexington Branch and B&L as its Boston entry. Gilman Square was named after Charles E. Gilman, Somerville's first town and city clerk. Before becoming town clerk, Gilman worked for the B&L and sold the first ticket between its two terminal destinations.

A foundation was laid in 1886 for a new stone station on the south side of the tracks. The Boston and Maine Railroad (B&M) acquired the B&L in 1887. The new station opened in 1888; the old wooden station was split into two sections which were reused as houses, which are still standing near Magoun Square. The new station was made of red marble ashlar with rough marble trim; the waiting room featured a marble fireplace. On February 3, 1898, a Lexington Branch express collided with a Stoneham Branch local at the station, injuring about 40 passengers.

The inner suburban stations lost much of their ridership to streetcars, especially after the Lechmere Viaduct sped travel times to downtown beginning in 1912. The ticket office at Winter Hill was closed in 1926. On April 25, 1927, the Lexington Branch was reconnected to the Fitchburg Line; the 1870-built line west of Somerville Junction became the Fitchburg Cutoff used only by freight trains. Three stations on the cutoff plus Prospect Hill and East Cambridge stations east of Winter Hill were closed entirely. The railroad unsuccessfully attempted to sell the Winter Hill station building for reuse. The abandoned station building was demolished in July and August 1934, as it had become a target for vandalism. A small number of trains continued to stop until February 19, 1937. The stone base of the former station was used to house electric equipment until Green Line Extension construction began in 2018.

During the late 1960s and early 1970s, the newly formed MBTA reopened several inner-suburb commuter rail stations in response to community desire for service that was faster if less frequent than buses. In 1976, Winter Hill station was considered for reactivation, but ridership was expected to be negligible due to the nearby route 80, 88, 90, and 94 buses.

=== Green Line Extension ===
==== Previous plans ====
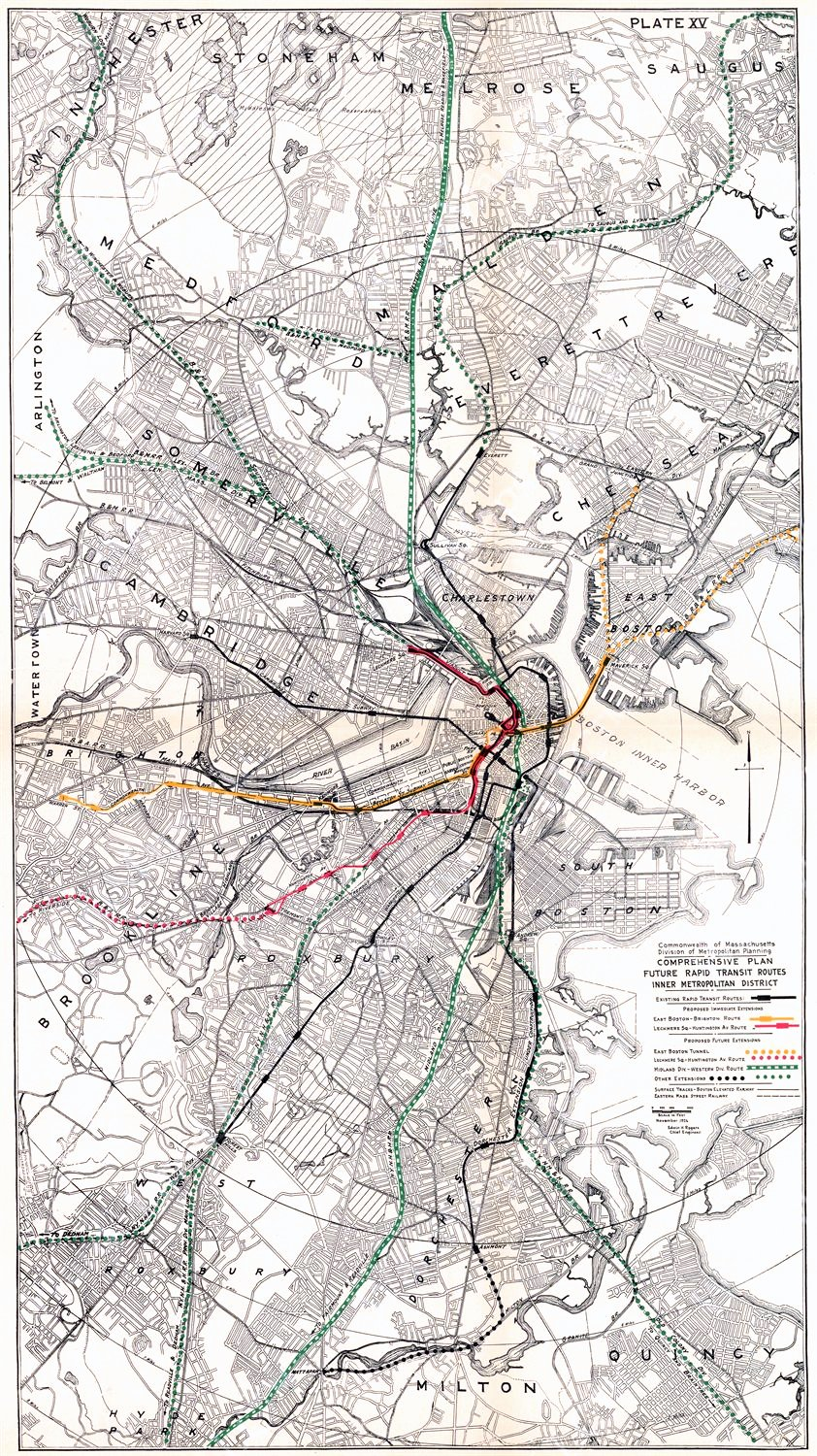
Map showing the 1926-proposed extensions northwest from Lechmere (at left)

The Boston Elevated Railway (BERy) opened Lechmere station in 1922 as a terminal for streetcar service in the Tremont Street subway. That year, with the downtown subway network and several radial lines in service, the BERy indicated plans to build three additional radial subways: one paralleling the Midland Branch through Dorchester, a second branching from the Boylston Street subway to run under Huntington Avenue, and a third extending from Lechmere Square northwest through Somerville. The Report on Improved Transportation Facilities, published by the Boston Division of Metropolitan Planning in 1926, proposed extension from Lechmere to North Cambridge and beyond via the Southern Division and the 1870-built cutoff. Winter Hill was to be the site of an intermediate station in this and subsequent plans.

In 1945, a preliminary report from the state Coolidge Commission recommended nine suburban rapid transit extensions – most similar to the 1926 plan – along existing railroad lines. These included an extension from Lechmere to Woburn over the Southern Division, again with Winter Hill as an intermediate stop. The 1962 North Terminal Area Study recommended that the elevated Lechmere–North Station segment be abandoned. The Main Line (now the Orange Line) was to be relocated along the B&M Western Route; it would have a branch following the Southern Division to Arlington or Woburn.

The Massachusetts Bay Transportation Authority (MBTA) was formed in 1964 as an expansion of the Metropolitan Transit Authority to subsidize suburban commuter rail service, as well as to construct rapid transit extensions to replace some commuter rail lines. In 1965, as part of systemwide rebranding, the Tremont Street subway and its connecting lines became the Green Line. The 1966 Program for Mass Transportation, the MBTA's first long-range plan, listed a short extension from Lechmere to Washington Street as an immediate priority, with a second phase reaching to Mystic Valley Parkway (Route 16) or West Medford.

The 1972 final report of the Boston Transportation Planning Review listed a Green Line extension from Lechmere to Ball Square as a lower priority, as did several subsequent planning documents. In 1980, the MBTA began a study of the "Green Line Northwest Corridor" (from Haymarket to Medford), with extension past Lechmere one of its three topic areas. Extensions to Tufts University or Union Square were considered.

==== Station planning ====
In 1991, the state agreed to build a set of transit projects as part of an agreement with the Conservation Law Foundation (CLF), which had threatened a lawsuit over auto emissions from the Central Artery/Tunnel Project (Big Dig). Among these projects was a "Green Line Extension To Ball Square/Tufts University", to be complete by the end of 2011. No progress was made until an updated agreement was signed in 2005. The Beyond Lechmere Northwest Corridor Study, a Major Investment Study/alternatives analysis, was published in 2005. The analysis studied a variety of light rail, bus rapid transit, and commuter rail extensions, all of which included a Gilman Square station at the former Winter Hill station site. The highest-rated alternatives all included an extension to West Medford with Gilman Square as one of the intermediate stations.

The Massachusetts Executive Office of Transportation and Public Works submitted an Expanded Environmental Notification Form (EENF) to the Massachusetts Executive Office of Environmental Affairs in October 2006. The EENF identified a Green Line extension with Medford and Union Square branches as the preferred alternative. That December, the Secretary of Environmental Affairs issued a certificate that required analysis of Lowell Line stations at Tufts University and Gilman Square in the draft environmental impact report (DEIR) for the Green Line Extension (GLX). Plans shown in early 2008 called for a Green Line platform between School Street and Medford Street, with no commuter rail platform.

Planned station sites were announced in May 2008. Unlike the other four stations on the Medford Branch, only one site – between School Street and Medford Street – was considered for Gilman Square station. The DEIR, released in October 2009, did not recommend the construction of a commuter rail platform at Gilman Square or Tufts University. The width of a platform and a gauntlet track for freight would require additional right-of-way width, which would have substantial impacts on adjacent properties. Preliminary plans in the DEIR called for the main station entrance to be on Medford Street at Gilman Square near Pearl Street, with an additional entrance from the Community Path on the south side. (The Community Path was to be at track level under the bridges, but would rise to street level between them for station access.) An emergency exit would connect to the School Street bridge.

Updated plans shown in May 2011 removed the direct entrance from the Community Path, replacing it with a footbridge from the path to the entrance plaza, and added a kiss and ride loop next to the headhouse. Plans presented in February 2012 added a second level to the headhouse, with the footbridge replaced by a direct entrance from the Community Path. The bike cage was relocated to the southwest side of the tracks, and a traction power substation was added near School Street. A further update in June 2013, with design 60% complete, reduced the size of the Medford Street headhouse and enlarged the Community Path entrance. The substation was moved below ground level. Design was then paused while Phase 2/2A stations (Lechmere, Union Square, and East Somerville) were prioritized, as they were scheduled to open sooner than the rest of the GLX. Design resumed in fall 2014 and reached 90% by June 2015.

By 2012, the portion of the Medford Branch from Gilman Square station to College Avenue was expected to be completed by June 2019. A Gilman Square commuter rail station to supplement the Green Line station was again listed as a possibility in 2012 as an interim air quality mitigation measure in response to delays in building the Green Line Extension. However, such a station would have been costly to build and could not have been completed by the 2015 deadline, and was thus not supported by MassDOT.

==== Redesign ====
In August 2015, the MBTA disclosed that project costs had increased substantially, triggered a wholesale re-evaluation of the GLX project. In December 2015, the MBTA ended its contracts with four firms. Construction work in progress continued, but no new contracts were awarded. At that time, cancellation of the project was considered possible, as were elimination of the Union Square Branch and other cost reduction measures. In May 2016, the MassDOT and MBTA boards approved a modified project that had undergone value engineering to reduce its cost. Stations were simplified to resemble D branch surface stations rather than full rapid transit stations, with canopies, faregates, escalators, and some elevators removed. Gilman Square station, previously planned to have two elevators, was reduced to one.

In December 2016, the MBTA announced a new planned opening date of 2021 for the extension. A design-build contract for the GLX was awarded in November 2017. The winning proposal included six additive options – elements removed during value engineering – including full-length canopies at all stations and a second elevator at Gilman Square. Station design advanced from 30% in March 2018 to 80% that December and to 100% in October 2019.

==== Construction ====
Demolition of the Homans Building

Both road bridges adjacent to the station site were rebuilt in the decades prior to the GLX: the 1910-built Medford Street bridge was reconstructed in 1983, and the circa-1900 School Street bridge in 2001. However, the bridges required further modification to accommodate the GLX. The Medford Street bridge was reduced to one sidewalk and a single vehicle lane from February 24, 2015, to September 6, 2016, for construction of a temporary utility bridge; the School Street bridge was similarly partially closed from April 8 to late August 2015.

Both bridges were subsequently modified to add an additional span behind the existing south abutment to provide space for the southbound Green Line track. The Medford Street bridge closed for renovations on May 17, 2019, with MBTA bus route 80 detoured, followed by the School Street bridge in April 2020. (Original plans called for sequential closures, but delays forced the closures to overlap.) Steel was placed for the new School Street span on February 25, 2021, followed by Medford Street on March 18. A temporary footbridge was in place next to the School Street bridge until May 8, 2021; the main bridge reopened for pedestrians and bikes on August 24.

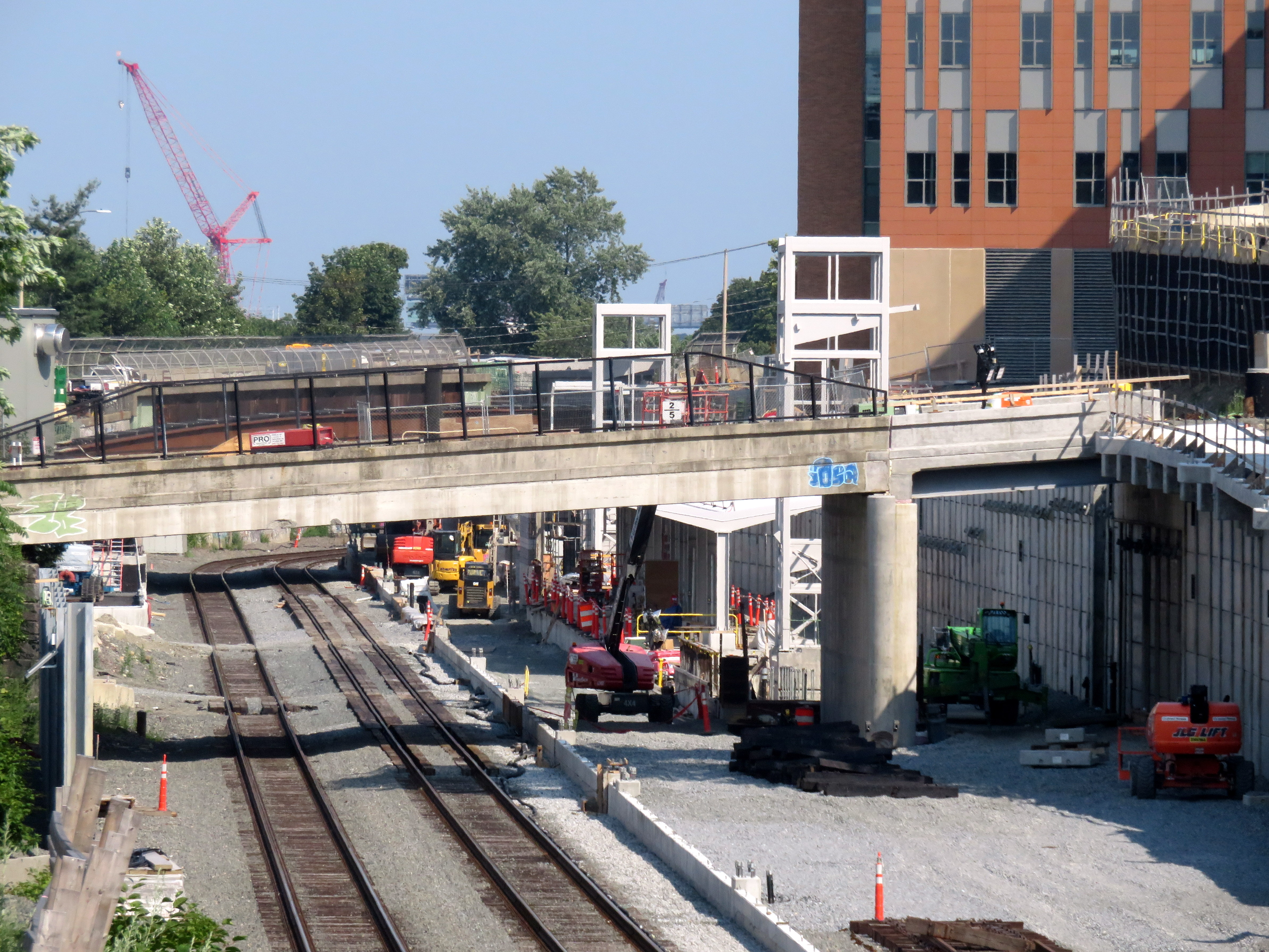
Station construction in July 2021

The "structurally compromised" Homans Building, a former food distribution facility on the north side of the station site, was demolished to make room for the traction power substation and construction access. A concrete carving of a lion's head – the logo of grocery merchandiser Monarch Foods, for whom the art deco building was constructed in 1929 – was selected for preservation and display near the new station. In September 2018, a silicone cast of the sculpture was made; it was then carefully removed from the building and stored. Demolition began on March 18, 2019, and was completed on April 6.

Work on the substation and a retaining wall for the station was underway by February 2020. Construction on the station itself began in June 2020; by August, the platform foundation and south headhouse were underway. The concrete platform was poured in November and December 2020. The east elevator shaft was erected on March 30, 2021, by which time the platform canopy was under construction, followed by the west elevator shaft on June 19.

Original plans called for the D Branch to be extended to Medford/Tufts. However, in April 2021, the MBTA indicated that the Medford Branch would instead be served by the E Branch. By March 2021, the station was expected to open in December 2021. In June 2021, the MBTA indicated an additional delay, under which the station was expected to open in May 2022. In February 2022, the MBTA announced that the Medford Branch would open in "late summer". Train testing on the Medford Branch began in May 2022. The Medford Street bridge reopened on July 1, 2022, followed by the School Street bridge on December 8. In August 2022, the planned station opening was delayed to November 2022. The Medford Branch, including Gilman Square station, opened on December 12, 2022.
