= Cross Street station (MBTA) =

Former train station in Winchester, Massachusetts, US

Cross Street
- Cross Street station around 1954

General information
- Location: Cross Street east of Main Street; Winchester, Massachusetts
- Coordinates: 42.46590°N 71.14477°W
- Line: Woburn Branch
- Platforms: 1
- Tracks: 1

Construction
- Parking: 12 spaces

History
- Opened: Between 1844 and 1846
- Closed: January 30, 1981
- Rebuilt: 1893, 1955

Passengers
- 1976: 77 daily boardings

Former services
| Preceding station | MBTA | Following station |
|---|---|---|
| Woburn Terminus | Lowell Line Woburn Branch Closed 1981 | Winchester Center toward North Station |
| Preceding station | Boston and Maine Railroad | Following station |
| Woburn Highlands toward Concord, NH | Boston – Concord, NH via Woburn Loop until 1959 | Winchester toward Boston |
| Woburn Terminus | Woburn Branch after 1959 | Winchester toward Boston |
Location

Cross Street station was an MBTA Commuter Rail station in northern Winchester, Massachusetts, on the border with Woburn. The station first opened in the mid-1840s as Richardson Row on the Woburn Branch Railroad, part of the Boston and Lowell Railroad (B&L). It was renamed Cross Street in 1876. The Boston and Maine Railroad (B&M) leased the B&L in 1887, built a new depot at Cross Street in 1893, and replaced it with a concrete shelter in 1955. The Massachusetts Bay Transportation Authority (MBTA) began subsidizing service on the Woburn Branch in 1965 and purchased the line in 1976. The station was closed along with the Woburn Branch in 1981.

== History ==
=== Boston and Lowell Railroad ===
The Woburn Branch Railroad opened between South Woburn (later Winchester) and Woburn on December 30, 1844. The line was owned by the Boston and Lowell Railroad (B&L), with local trains running between Woburn and Boston. By 1846, the branch had several flag stops: Cutter's near modern Swanton Street, Richardson Row (often styled as Richardson's Row) at the eponymous street, and Horn Pond Gate (often simply Horn Pond) at Fowle Street. Winchester separated from Woburn in 1850, with Richardson's Row (later renamed Cross Street) crossing the railroad near the border between the towns.

In 1854, the Boston Ice Company built a short spur to Horn Pond from the Woburn Branch, connecting south of Richardson's Row. The B&L operated the branch in the winter to haul ice cut from the pond. In August 1876, the B&L changed the names of four stations. Horn Pond became Woburn Highlands, while Richardson's Row became Cross Street. The B&L extended the Woburn Branch northwards from Woburn in November 1885, rejoining the mainline in North Woburn to form the Woburn Loop. Many Boston–Lowell local trains were rerouted to the loop, serving intermediate stops including Cross Street.

=== Boston and Maine Railroad ===
The Boston and Maine Railroad (B&M) leased the B&L in 1887 as its Southern Division. By 1889, Cross Street station had a small building on the east side of the tracks just north of Cross Street, while Cutter's was no longer a stop. The B&M built a new one-story wooden station building at Cross Street in 1893. It was on the west side of the tracks, just south of Cross Street. The Horn Pond Branch closed in 1919.

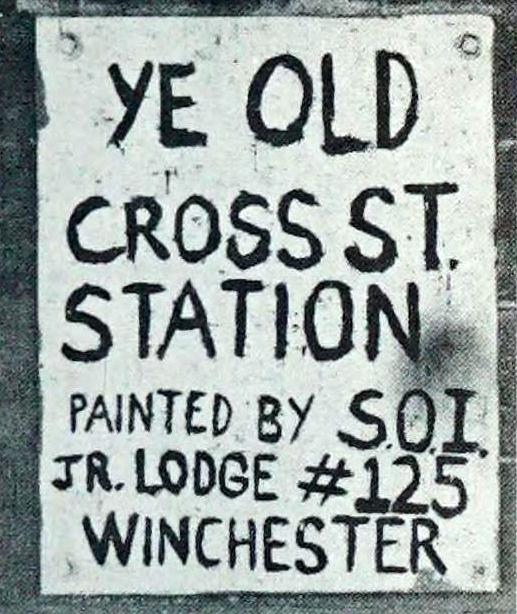
Hand-painted signage in 1977

In 1955, the station buildings at Cross Street and three other Woburn Loop stops were replaced with unstaffed concrete shelters. The northern half of the Woburn Loop was closed on June 14, 1959, as was Woburn Highlands station; this left Cross Street and Woburn as the only remaining stops on what was again the Woburn Branch. Woburn Branch service had increased somewhat through the 1950s, even as most lines saw cuts. With the 1959 cut, many Woburn Loop through trains were replaced with Woburn–Boston trains, maintaining relatively frequent service to Woburn and Cross Street.

=== MBTA ===
The Massachusetts Bay Transportation Authority (MBTA) was formed in 1964 to subsidize suburban commuter rail service. Subsidies for a number of B&M lines including the Woburn Branch took effect on January 18, 1965. Cross Street station had 84 daily boardings in a 1972 count; 59 walked to the station, while the remainder used the 12-space parking lot or were dropped off.

The MBTA purchased the B&M commuter equipment and lines, including the Woburn Branch, on December 27, 1976. The agency soon began making improvements to the aging stations. A 1977 MBTA study recommended paving the gravel parking lot and platform, adding lighting, and putting signage at the station and nearby intersections. At that time, the station saw 77 daily boardings.

Weekend service on the branch ended on September 7, 1980. All service ended on January 30, 1981, due to poor track conditions and the MBTA's poor finances. The line was abandoned in 1982; the section within Winchester was purchased by the town in 1983 and sold off, while the Woburn section largely remains MBTA property. The disused Cross Street shelter was demolished in the mid-1980s.
