= Brickbottom (Somerville, Massachusetts) =

Human settlement in United States of America

Coordinates: 42°22′40″N 71°5′11″W

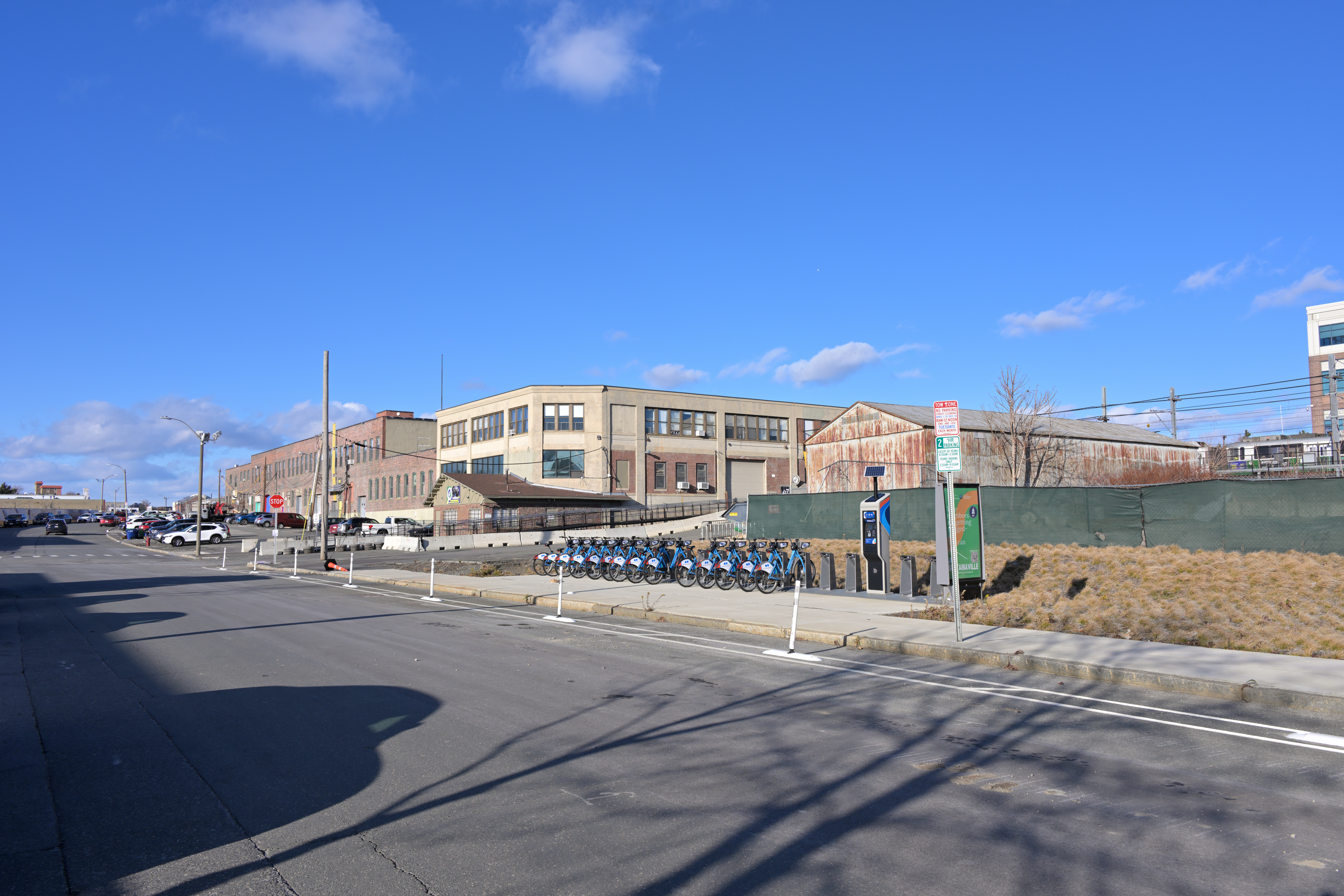
Chestnut Street in Brickbottom, with the Green Line visible on the far right

Brickbottom is an industrial district located in southeastern Somerville, Massachusetts, United States. Along with the nearby Inner Belt District, Brickbottom is a historically industrial zone of Somerville, with factories, warehouses, distribution centers, railroad connections, regional maintenance facilities, MBTA and Amtrak offices, retail stores and a hotel.

An elevated railroad right-of-way separates the Brickbottom area from the Inner Belt District located to the east. The two areas resemble each other in terms of use. However, Brickbottom has older dense development in a grid pattern and has a couple of small neighborhoods. Somerville is currently engaged in an ongoing community process, begun in 2011, to determine a long-term Master Plan for the Inner Belt and Brickbottom region. A draft of the plan should be available for public comment by the end of 2013.

== History ==
=== Urban renewal ===
Although the Inner Belt highway was cancelled due to local opposition, the municipal government had already razed entire swaths of Brickbottom during the 1950s in anticipation of the plan. Nonetheless, the city decided to carry on with their urban renewal campaigns in the area. The purpose of the renewal plan was to destroy the existing neighborhood grid pattern and reorganize the area to accommodate the Interstate, provide automobile circulation and parking, and establish single-use zoning. Simultaneously, American manufacturing began a long decline and the Somerville Industrial Park that came online in the late 1960s barely ever broke even.

=== Artist colonization ===
The failure of the ambitious Inner Belt project precipitated the relative decline of activity in the neighborhood, which allowed partial colonization of the site by artists and craftspeople. In 1988, the redevelopment of the A&P food-storage and bakery warehouse located at the corner of McGrath Highway and Fitchburg Street enabled establishment of the Brickbottom Artists Cooperative. The group of 85 artists purchased the warehouse, providing affordable housing for artists. This live-work space was the first return of residential use to Brickbottom since the 1940s and soon the project became nationally recognized as the largest artist community under one roof in the U.S., with 155 units. The lofts continue to offer a living opportunity for artists, and provide the City with cultural events and exhibits that include the popular "Open Studios" every November.

=== 21st century ===
In 2001, after installation of fiber optic infrastructure, a major telecommunications building was completed at 200 Inner Belt Road in the Inner Belt Industrial Park. The hope was that this would spark high-tech interest in the area; however, a drastic downturn in the economy brought the telecom movement to a halt across the region. Some of the companies that came to revitalize the area left, leaving vacant buildings once more.

A waste transfer station (previously an incinerator) was closed in the 2010s.

East Somerville station on the Green Line Extension opened in December 2022, at Washington Street.
