= Gilman Square =

Neighborhood in Somerville, Massachusetts

Coordinates: 42.3881°N 71.0959°W

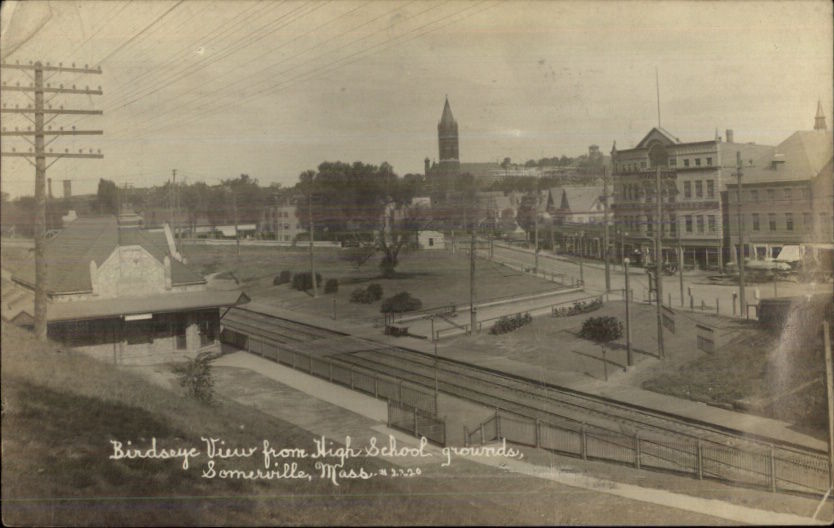
Postcard view from High School grounds, 1915

Gilman Square is a neighborhood in the area around Central Hill in Somerville, Massachusetts, United States. Historic Gilman Square is at the junction of Medford, Pearl, and Marshall streets and has been a small commercial center since the mid-19th century. With the development of the Gilman Square Green Line station, city planning documents consider the area within a rough ten-minute walk of the new station to be part of the Gilman Square neighborhood.

Neighborhood lines are fuzzy and Gilman Square is sometimes considered part of the extensive Winter Hill neighborhood. The area has also been referred to as Central Hill, and distinct from Winter Hill to the north, Spring Hill to the southwest, and Prospect Hill to the southeast.

== History ==
The Boston and Lowell Railroad came to the area in the mid-19th century, and rapid property development followed. By the turn of the century, Gilman Square featured a public green surrounded by four-story commercial buildings.

Gilman Square was named for Charles E. Gilman. Gilman was Somerville's town clerk during its entire existence as a town and the first elected city clerk, a position he remained in until his death.
