= Millers River (Middlesex) =

River in Middlesex County, Massachusetts, United States

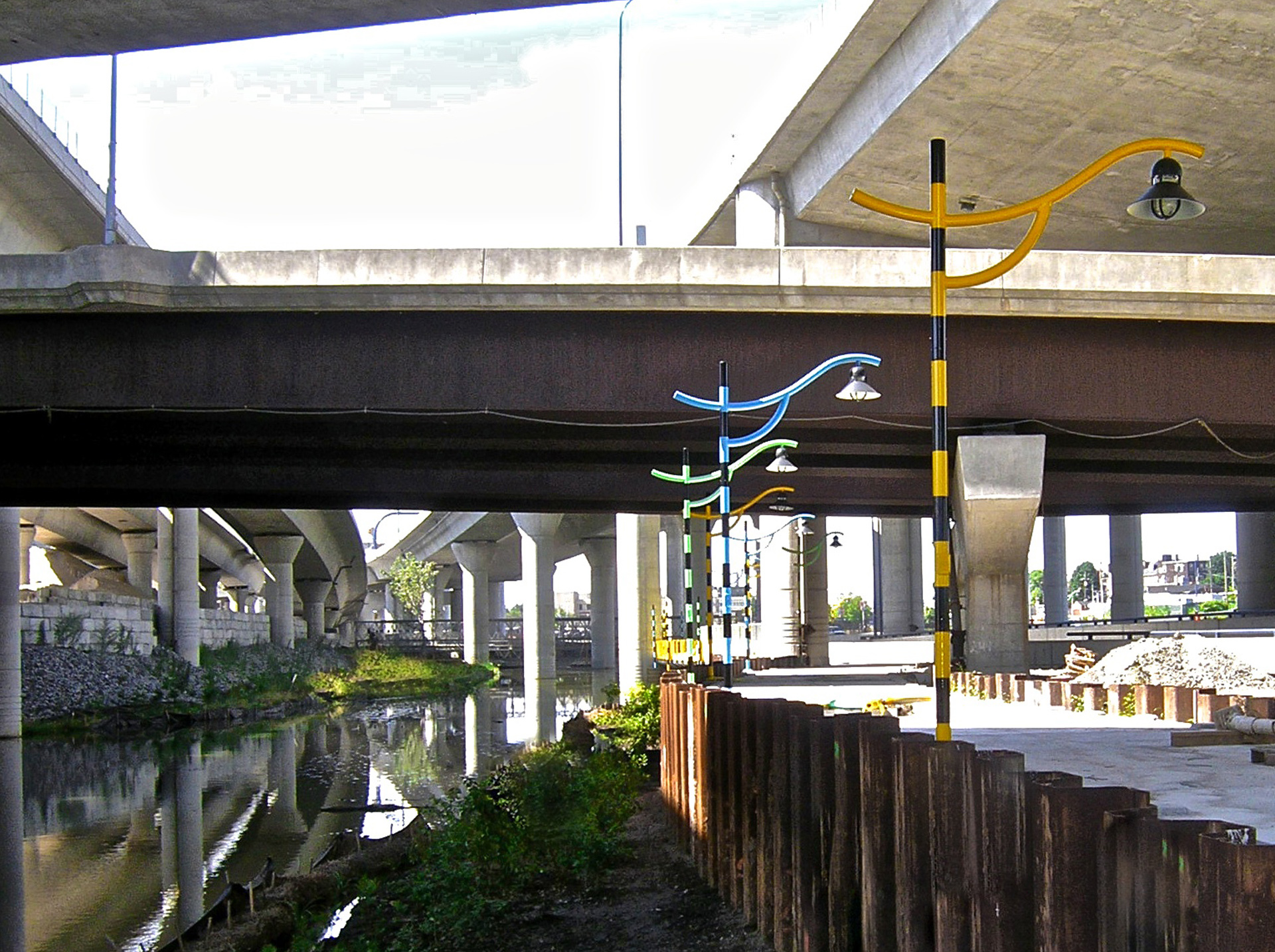
- Millers River under I-93 highway
- Interactive map of Millers River
- Location: Cambridge, Massachusetts; Boston, Massachusetts
- Coordinates: 42°22′14.0″N 71°03′56.3″W
- Status: public walkway
- Public transit: Community College (MBTA station)

Millers River (frequently written as Miller's River) was a river in Middlesex County, Massachusetts. It has since mostly been obscured by landfill and "made land" (land created by filling of waterways). The small remaining estuary is a remnant of wetlands and open water that once divided Cambridge from Charlestown, Massachusetts. The exact historical course of parts the river is somewhat uncertain, and thus parts of the Charlestown-Cambridge and Somerville-Cambridge borders may have changed due to incorrect historical reconstruction.

== History ==
Millers River flowed into the Charles River, providing water transport to commercial and industrial sites along its shores beginning in the early colonial period. It was previously called Willis Creek and is labeled as such on the 1777 Pelham Map, among others. In the late 19th century, Millers River was used as a dumping place for wastes from abattoirs and slaughterhouses. The stench and health problems related to this use resulted in some of the first public health based anti-pollution environmental laws in Massachusetts and provided precedent for early environmental protection laws throughout the United States. As a result of these issues Chapter 91 of the Massachusetts General Laws was established in 1866 to regulate uses of tidal waterways and is a powerful tool to protect the public welfare in relationship to filled and flowing tidelands today. The inaccessible and degraded industrial landscape around Millers River and along the lower Charles River basin became known during the late 19th century and 20th century as "the Lost Half-Mile".

== Issues regarding construction by the Central Artery/Tunnel Project ==
There is a small surviving section of Millers River along, and under, the North section of the I-93 Highway Charles River Crossing development. This several hundred yard-long section of river became the source of many contentious environmental issues during planning for the Big Dig highway project. The Charles River Watershed Association and The Conservation Law Foundation led efforts to protect Millers River and open it for public access. Permit requirements prevented the remaining section of the river from being filled, and Chapter 91 permits mandated pedestrian access to the previously inaccessible section of the Northern bank of the Charles River.

== Pedestrian access and public artwork ==
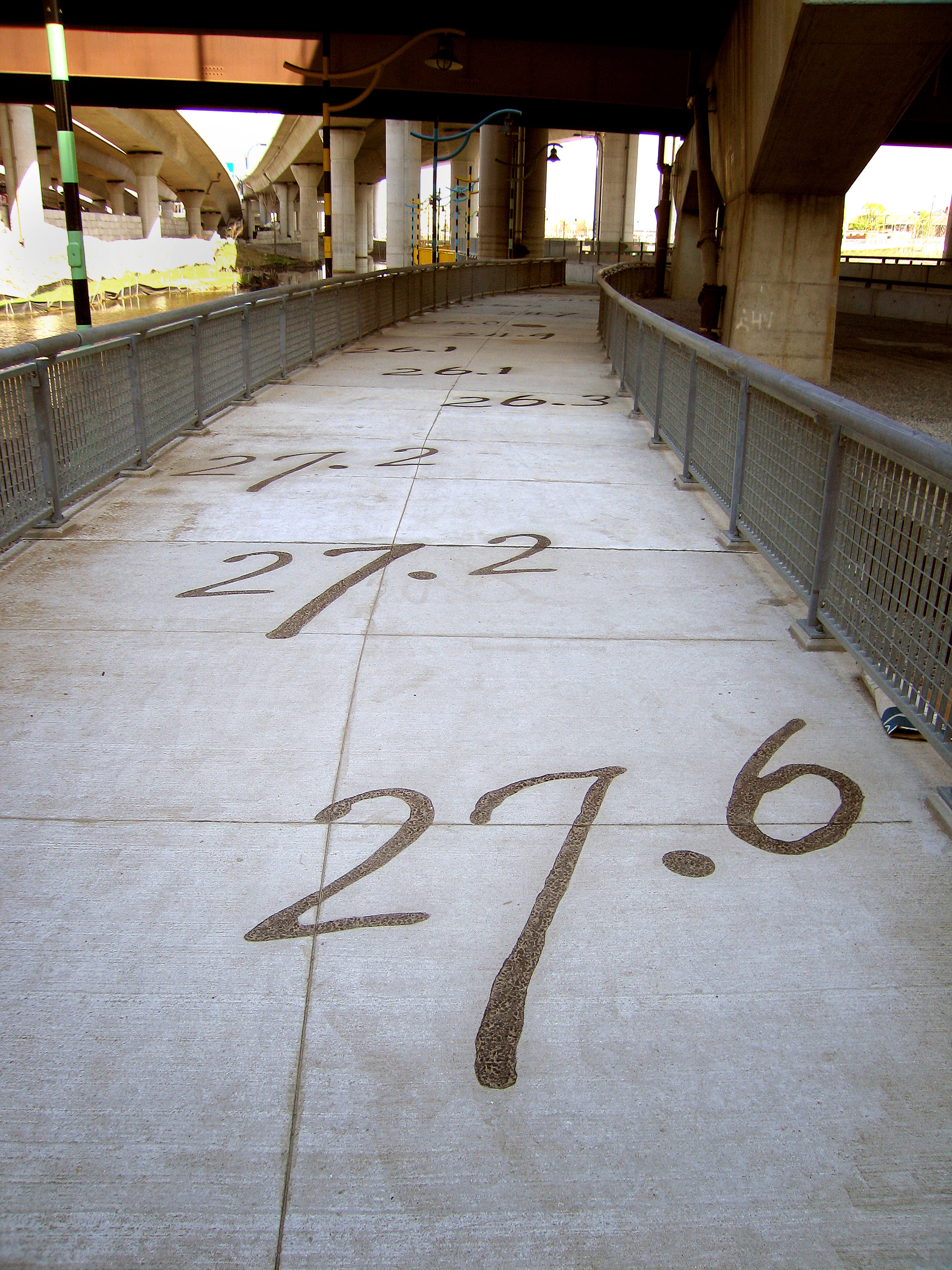
Harbor depth numbers, indicated in decimal feet, from an 1835 navigational chart, etched in concrete paving on location along Millers River Littoral Way, between the Charles River and Charlestown, Massachusetts

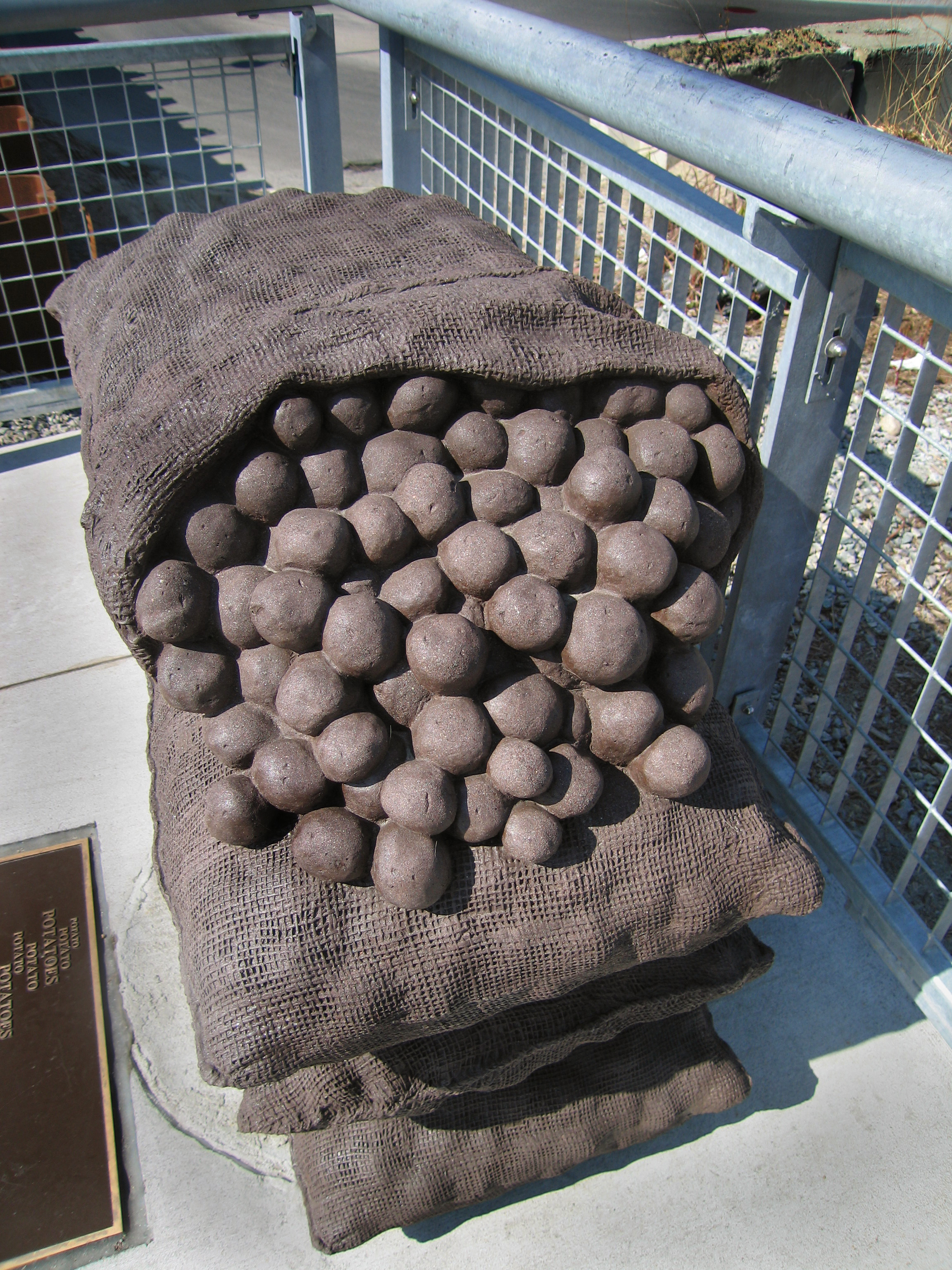
Four 50 lb burlap sacks of potatoes, made of cast stone, recall the massive potato sheds along Millers River that burned in 1962.

A pedestrian walkway with playfully designed light poles, interpretive historical panels, and bordered by re-introduced native wetland vegetation, allows access along the remaining section of Millers River between the Charles River and Rutherford Avenue in Charlestown, Massachusetts. A linear public art project, Millers River Littoral Way, presents a series of artworks, graphics, lighting, stainless steel bench sculptures, and etchings of historic pre-landfill harbor depths. In addition, the Potato Shed Memorial, marks the site of potato sheds that once existed in the area. This series of artworks provide placemaking waypoints for pedestrians traversing the grid of structural piers that support Interstate Highway 93 above. The public art concept plan, and artwork along the access walkway and Littoral Way, were created by artist Ross Miller.

The mouth of Millers River, closed off by railroad tracks and wharves since the 1830s, was opened to the Charles River as a part of Central Artery construction. Where Millers River meets the North bank of the Charles River a new park landscape (completed 2012) provides pedestrian and bicycle access into a previously inaccessible part of industrial Boston.

Visitors traveling from the West from North Point Park Cambridge, cross over Millers River on the North Bank Pedestrian Bridge, funded through the Obama Administration's American Recovery and Reinvestment Act. Designed for both bicycles and pedestrians, the bridge's sinusoidal shape curves over MBTA railway tracks, and threads between railroad Control Tower A and the Route 1 North highway loop ramp. The bridge terminates on the East side of Millers River under the viaducts and structure of the Zakim Bridge and into a rugged landscape built from reclaimed granite seawall blocks, designed by CRJA-IBI Group. A light-based public artwork, 5 Beacons for the Lost Half Mile, guides pedestrians out from under the highway structures into Paul Revere Park in Charlestown.

== Future restoration of Millers River ==
Several now-buried sections of the Millers River watershed have been identified by the Charles River Watershed Association and others as locations to develop in order to improve local water quality and increase natural rainwater storage. Options to achieve this include opening culverted drainage, providing surface water recharge infiltration swales, and exploring the "daylighting" (opening up) of portions of the now-filled Miller's River. The Massachusetts Department of Conservation and Recreation is developing management plans to enhance and protect the ecological environment of Millers River and the lower Charles River Basin, and to support and encourage passive and active recreational use.
