= Woburn Branch Railroad =

Former railroad line in Massachusetts, US

Map

The Woburn Branch Railroad (known as the Woburn Loop) was a branch line of the Boston and Lowell Railroad ("B&L") and later of the MBTA Commuter Rail system that connected the Lowell Line with the city square in Woburn, Massachusetts.

== History ==
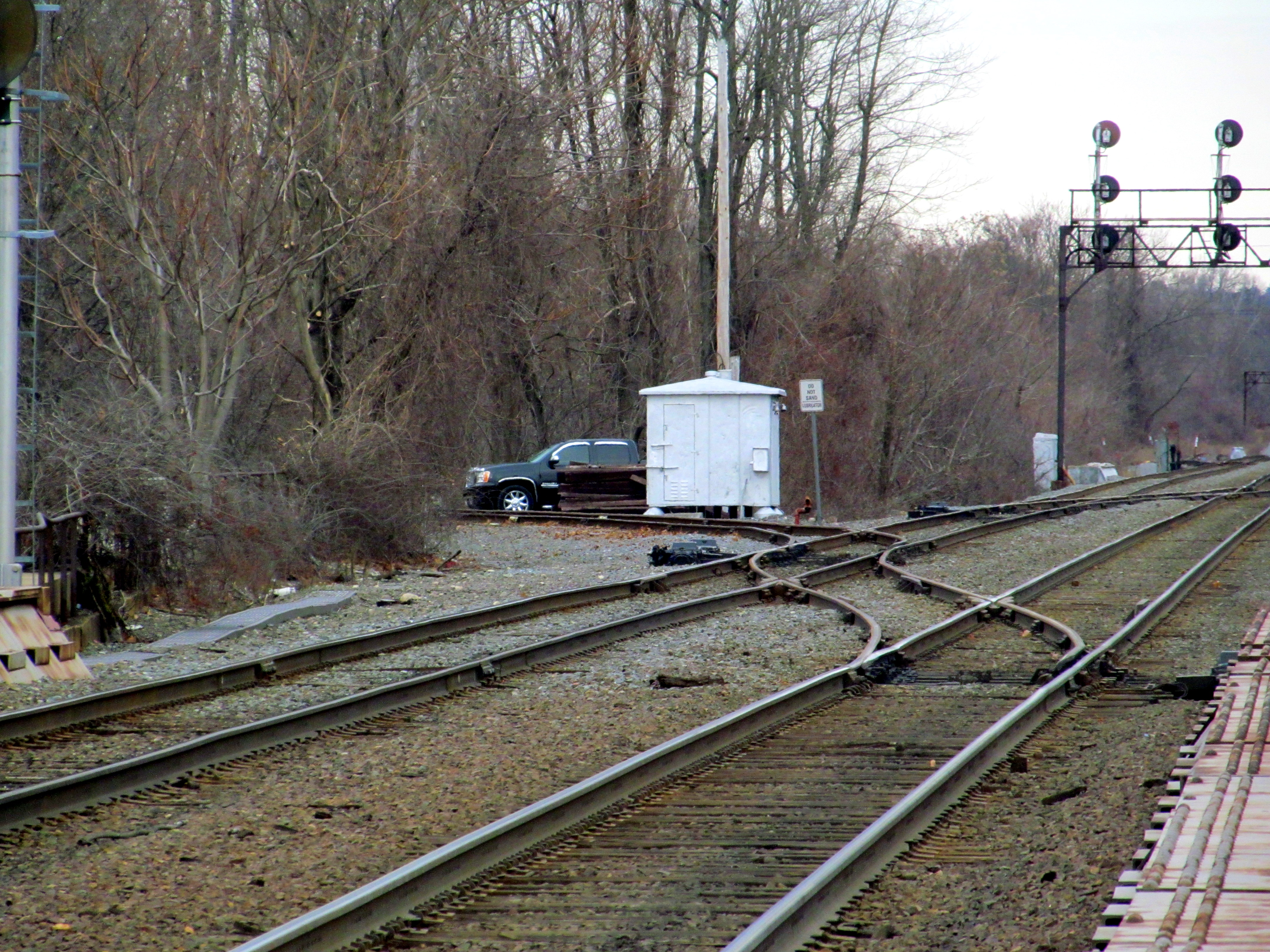
Former junction of the Woburn Branch Railroad (left) and the Boston & Lowell Railroad (now the MBTA Lowell Line) in Winchester in 2013

When the B&L laid out its main line, it respected the wishes of the people of Woburn not to run the line through their town center. Instead, the B&L ran the line through the Montvale, Mishawum, and North Woburn sections of the town, bypassing the center.

As Woburn grew in size from a town to a city, its citizens regretted pushing the railroad to the east end of town and request that the B&L put in a branch line to the center of town. The railroad agreed and in December 1844 opened the new line from its main line at Winchester (then known as South Woburn) to Woburn Square.

The Horn Pond Branch Railroad was a short freight-only branch off the Woburn Branch to ice houses on Horn Pond. The line was built at the request of the Boston Ice Company and trains ran only during ice cutting season. The line opened in 1854 and lasted until the line was abandoned in 1919. The old ice houses burned down several years later.

The northern loop, built in 1885, continued the line north to the main line at North Woburn Junction in South Wilmington. This allowed the B&L to route some of its passenger trains down the Loop to serve the city. This service continued until 1959 when passenger service was cut back to Woburn Square. The branch was abandoned from Woburn Square north to the Wilmington/Woburn town line in 1961.

The B&L continued commuter rail service to Woburn on the original branch line from Winchester. The MBTA took over passenger service in 1971 and outsourced it to the Boston and Maine Railroad ("B&M"). Trains ran on the Woburn Loop until 1981 when poor track conditions and budget cuts stopped service. The MBTA and the B&M formally abandoned the branch line in 1982. The MBTA still owns the right-of-way in Woburn, but the portion in Winchester was purchased by the town in 1983, and most was sold off for private development.

The part of the northern loop within the town of Wilmington (about a mile in length) is still used as an industrial spur to service freight customers along the line in South Wilmington.
