= Ipswich Street line =

Former streetcar line in Boston and Brookline, Massachusetts

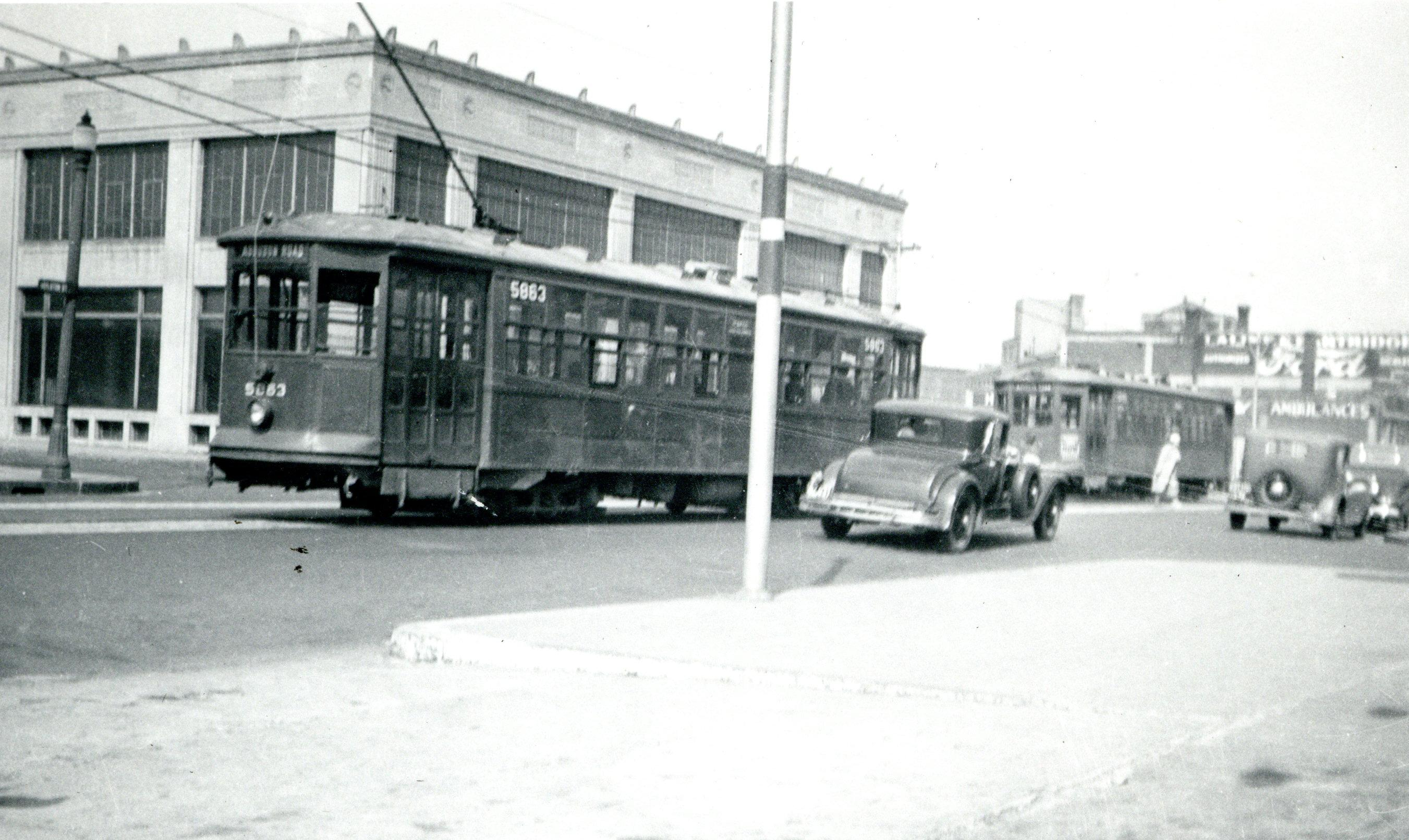
- The Audubon Road shuttle – the last portion of the line to operate – on Boylston Street around 1934

Overview
- Status: Abandoned – MBTA bus routes 55, 60, and 65 now operate

Service
- Operator: Boston Elevated Railway
- Depot: Cypress Street Carhouse

History
- Opened: July 1900
- Closed: July 14, 1934

Technical
- Track gauge: 1,435 mm (4 ft 8 1/2 in) standard gauge

The Ipswich Street line was a streetcar line in Boston and Brookline, Massachusetts. The line ran on Boylston Street and Ipswich Street in the Fenway–Kenmore neighborhood, and on Brookline Avenue through what is now the Longwood Medical Area to Brookline Village.

First proposed in the mid-1890s to aid development of the newly created Fenway–Kenmore area, the line opened in July 1900. Service initially ran between Park Street station and Cypress Street Carhouse; service was extended west to Chestnut Hill later in 1900. The east end of the route was cut back to Massachusetts station in 1925. The next year, the Ipswich Street line and the Huntington Avenue line swapped western terminals, with Ipswich Street service again running to Cypress Street. The west end of service was cut back to Brookline Village in 1932, and cut further to a short Audubon Road–Massachusetts shuttle in mid-1933. The shuttle was abandoned entirely in July 1934.

As streetcar service was cut back, it was replaced by bus routes. MBTA bus routes 55 and 60 are direct descendants of the Ipswich Street line, while route 65 (the descendant of a Huntington Avenue branch) also runs along part of the former line.

== History ==
=== Streetcar line ===
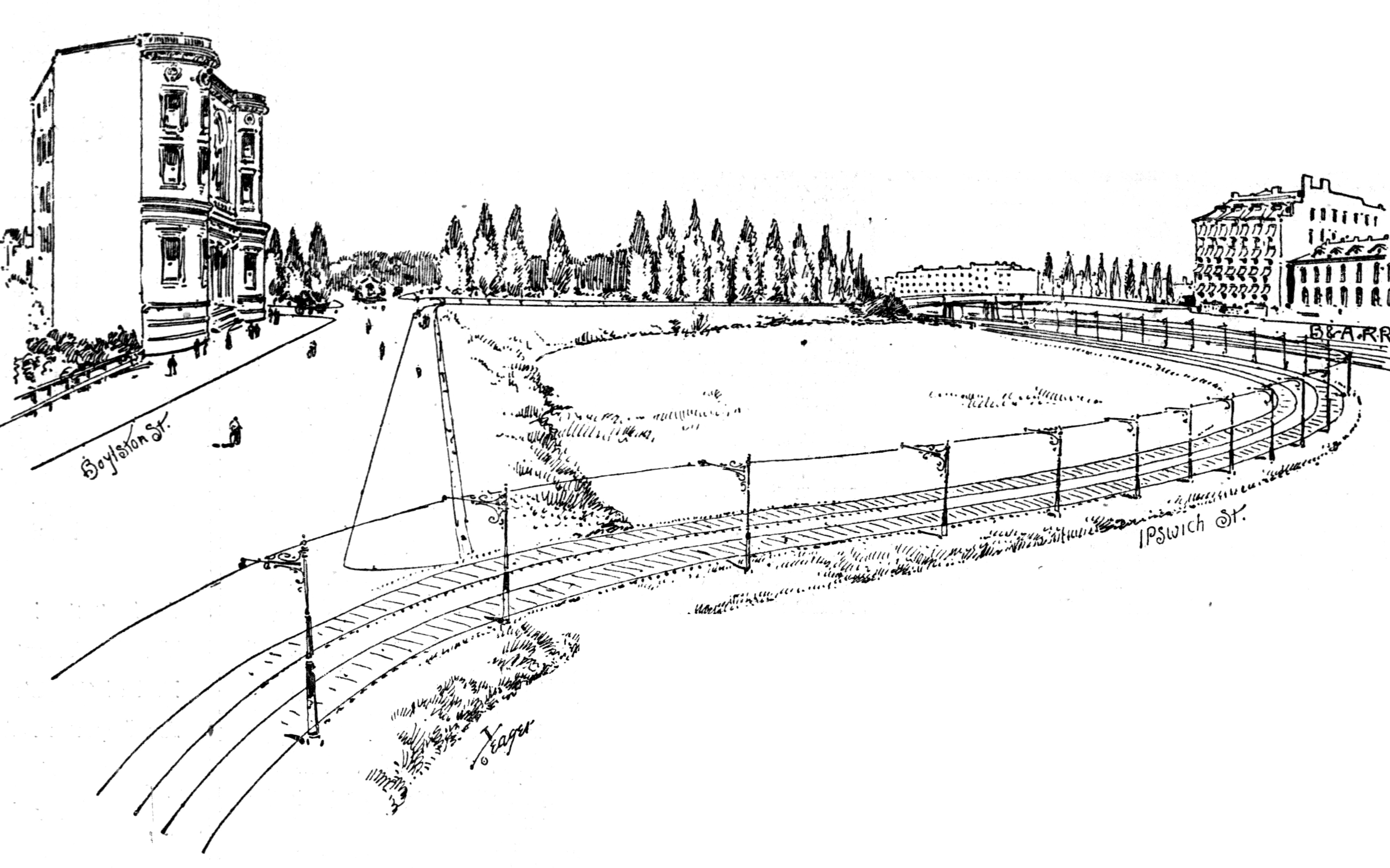
An 1899 illustration of the new tracks on Ipswich Street

In the 1890s, the West End Street Railway rapidly electrified its existing horsecar system. The speedier electric streetcars also allowed expansion into suburbs like Brookline and Brighton; new lines were built on Beacon Street in 1888–89 and on Commonwealth Avenue in 1894–96. The 1890s also saw the filling of the Back Bay Fens north of the Muddy River for new development. In 1895, a group of Brookline businessmen proposed a street car line from Newton Centre to downtown Boston independent of the West End. The line was to run southeast from Newton Centre on Cypress Street and Jackson Street, east to Brookline on Boylston Street (the Worcester Turnpike), and around Brookline Village on Cypress Street, School Street, and Aspinwall Avenue. It was to then run northeast on Brookline Avenue and the new western section of Boylston Street through the newly filled Fens, then use Newbury Street and Arlington Street to reach the Tremont Street subway. This routing was to avoid all West End-owned tracks, allowing the new line to use the city-owned subway even if the West End would not grant trackage rights over its surface lines. The West End's counterproposal called for an extension from Reservoir on Chestnut Hill Avenue and Boylston Street.

In 1897, the West End proposed to extend its line on Boylston Street westward from Massachusetts Avenue through the newly developing area. Objections were raised over the portion through the Fens parkland: the tracks would impede public access to the recently landscaped park, and the arch bridge over the Muddy River was in poor condition. A compromise was soon worked out where the line would divert north along Ipswich Street, parallel to the Boston and Albany Railroad mainline, thus avoiding the park entrance and the deficient bridge. The Boston Elevated Railway (BERy) – successor to the West End – began construction of the line in early 1899. By midyear, it was largely complete except for gaps where the city was laying water mains.

The line shown on a 1921 system map

Service on the line as far west as Longwood Avenue began on July 23, 1900. The full route opened around the end of the month; streetcars ran from the Cypress Street carhouse on existing tracks on Cypress Street and Boylston Street, on new tracks northeast on Brookline Avenue and east on Boylston Street and Ipswich Street, then east on existing tracks on Boylston Street to the subway. The same week, the BERy also opened a branch of the Huntington Avenue line from Brookline Village to Coolidge Corner (with through service to Allston); the two routes shared a short section of track in Brookline Village. The line was extended west on Boylston Street from Cypress Street to Chestnut Hill Avenue on September 29, 1900, and to the Newton line at Chestnut Hill on November 19. On May 5, 1903, the Boston and Worcester Street Railway (B&W) began operations. It initially terminated at Chestnut Hill, but was extended over BERy tracks on Boylston Street and Huntington Avenue to Park Square on July 6.

By 1907, regular service on the Ipswich Street line ran between Chestnut Hill and Park Street, with short turns running between Longwood Avenue and Park Street. Cypress Street Carhouse–Park Street trips were made to move streetcars in and out of the carhouse. In 1912, the BERy opened a transfer station at Brookline Village, simplifying transfers between the Ipswich Street line and the Huntington Avenue line's branches. The line was diverted into the new surface transfer station at Massachusetts station on November 28, 1919, where transfers could be made within fare control to the Massachusetts Avenue streetcar line and the Boylston Street subway. The Ipswich Street Line did not have all-night service.

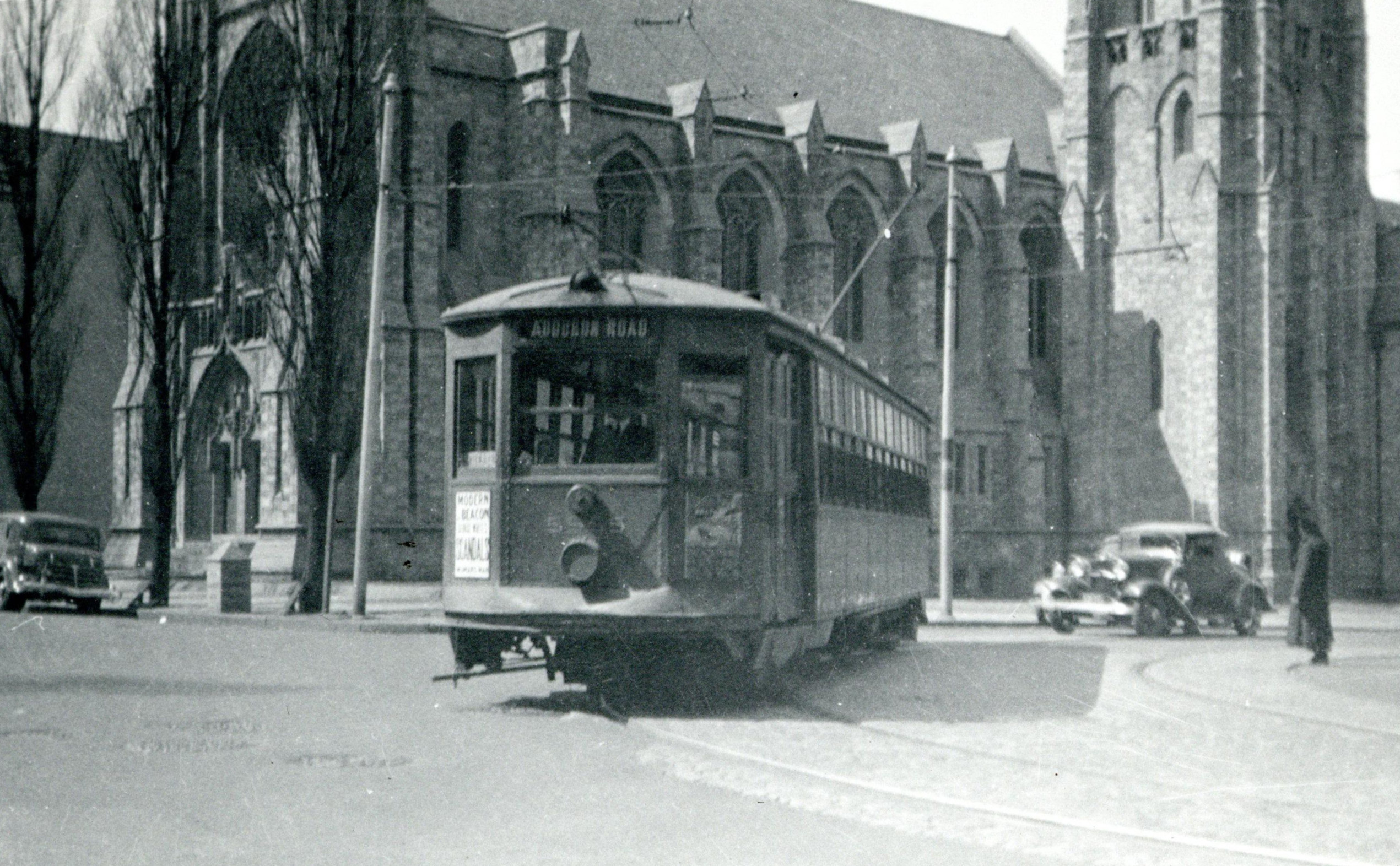
The Audubon Road shuttle around 1934

On June 13, 1925, the Ipswich Street line was cut back from Park Street to Massachusetts. It was the last service to run on Boylston Street between Copley Square and Massachusetts; a Bowdoin Square–Fenway bus route ran in its stead. In March 1926, the Huntington Avenue and Ipswich lines swapped western terminals, with Ipswich Street cars running to Cypress Street. This change restored a one-seat ride from Chestnut Hill to downtown Boston, which had been lost from the 1925 change.

As construction of the Worcester Turnpike progressed eastward, the B&W was replaced by buses on June 11, 1932. On November 26, 1932, the Ipswich Street line was cut back to Brookline Village, while buses operated between Brookline Village and Chestnut Hill. The Huntington Avenue line took over the Cypress Street branch until 1934. On March 20, 1933, bus service began running on Brookline Avenue between Brookline Village and Kenmore Square. That June, the Ipswich Street line was further cut to a shuttle service, with two Type 5 streetcars running between Audubon Road and Massachusetts. On July 14, 1934, the shuttle service was converted to buses, ending streetcar service on the Ipswich Street line.

=== Bus routes ===
In 1940–41, the BERy reassigned the public route numbers used for its services; those numbers have remained relatively consistent since. The BERy was replaced in 1947 by the Metropolitan Transit Authority (MTA), which was in return replaced by the Massachusetts Bay Transportation Authority (MBTA) in 1964. Three MBTA bus routes are the descendants of the Ipswich Street line:

==== 55 ====
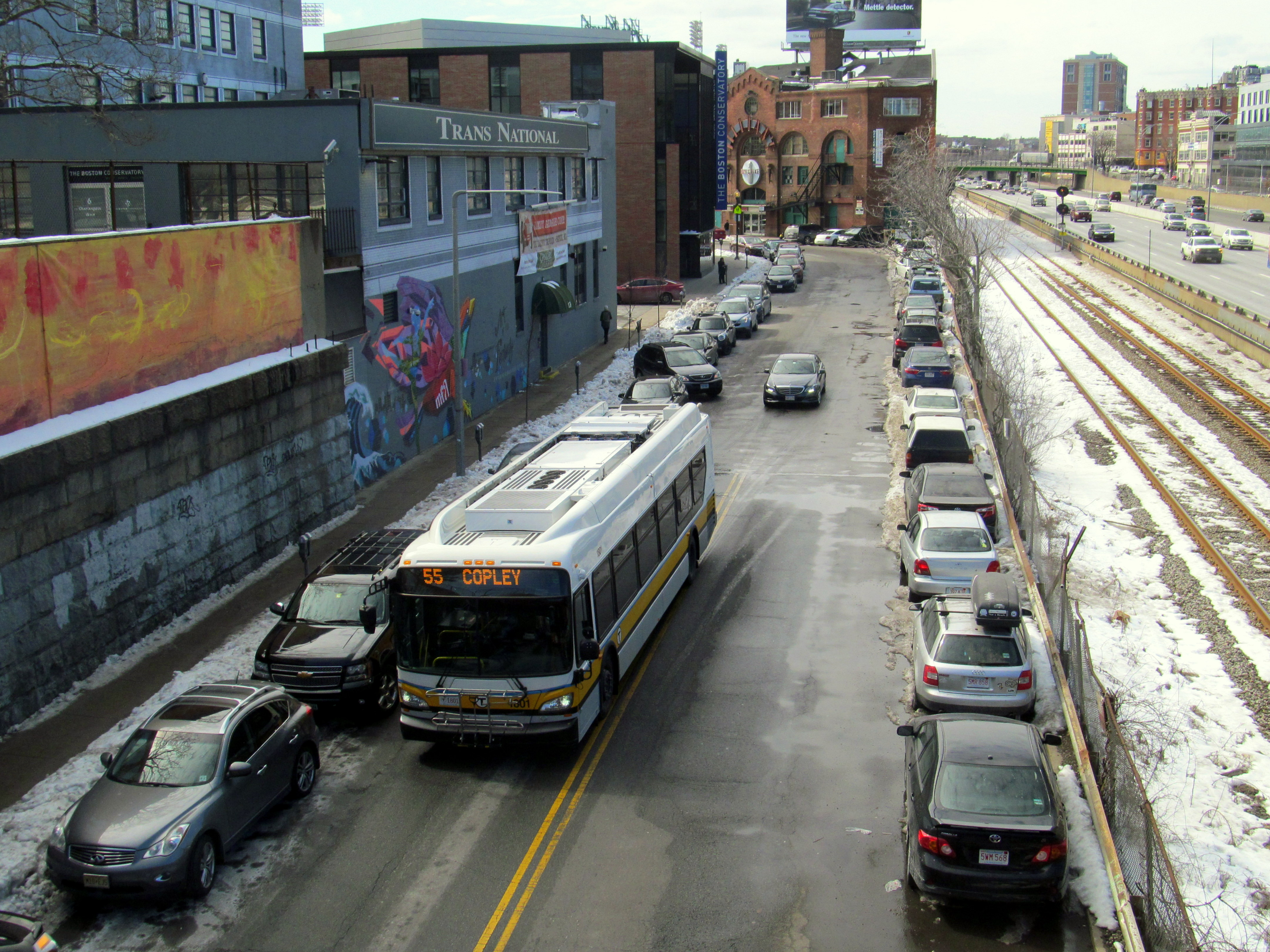
A route 55 bus on Ipswich Street in 2017

The original bus route that replaced the Aududon Road shuttle followed largely the same route; instead of reversing at Audubon Road, it looped on Kilmarnock Street, Queensbury Street, and Jersey Street through a residential area. It was assigned route number 55 in 1941. From September 1962 to June 1963, inbound buses ran via Brookline Avenue and Kenmore Square. The Massachusetts surface station was closed in January 1963 for construction of the Massachusetts Turnpike Extension, and buses looped via Burbank Street and Hemenway Street. The loop was changed to use Gloucester Street and Newbury Street around 1967; in December 1968, the loop was extended to Fairfield Street to better reach the new Prudential Center. It was extended again to Copley Square in December 1976. Weekday trips were extended to Park Street (with a loop around Boston Common) in 1982. Outbound trips were rerouted over Huntington Avenue in June 1998.

A 2018–19 MBTA review of its bus system found that route 55 was little used outside peak hours due to low frequency, unreliable service, and proximity to the Green Line. No short-term changes were recommended. The route was temporarily cut during the COVID-19 pandemic. Service east of Copley was suspended on March 17, 2020. Weekday midday service was suspended on August 31, 2020, followed by weekday evening service that December. All remaining service was suspended in March 2021, though midday service resumed that June.

In May 2022, the MBTA released a draft plan for a systemwide network redesign. The draft called for the 55 to be extended to Kendall/MIT station via Massachusetts Avenue, and to Longwood Medical Area via Brookline Avenue. The portion east of Massachusetts Avenue and the loop in the Fenway–Kenmore area would be cut. A revised proposal in November 2022 called for the 55 to be kept as a Fenway–Kenmore – Copley route. The name of the western terminal was simplified to "West Fenway" in June 2023. The route was extended east to Arlington station on June 15, 2025, due to construction at Copley Square. Service hours will be extended to 6 am–7 pm on December 13, 2026, restoring peak-hour service. The MBTA continues to operate the route as 55 West Fenway–Arlington station.

==== 60 ====
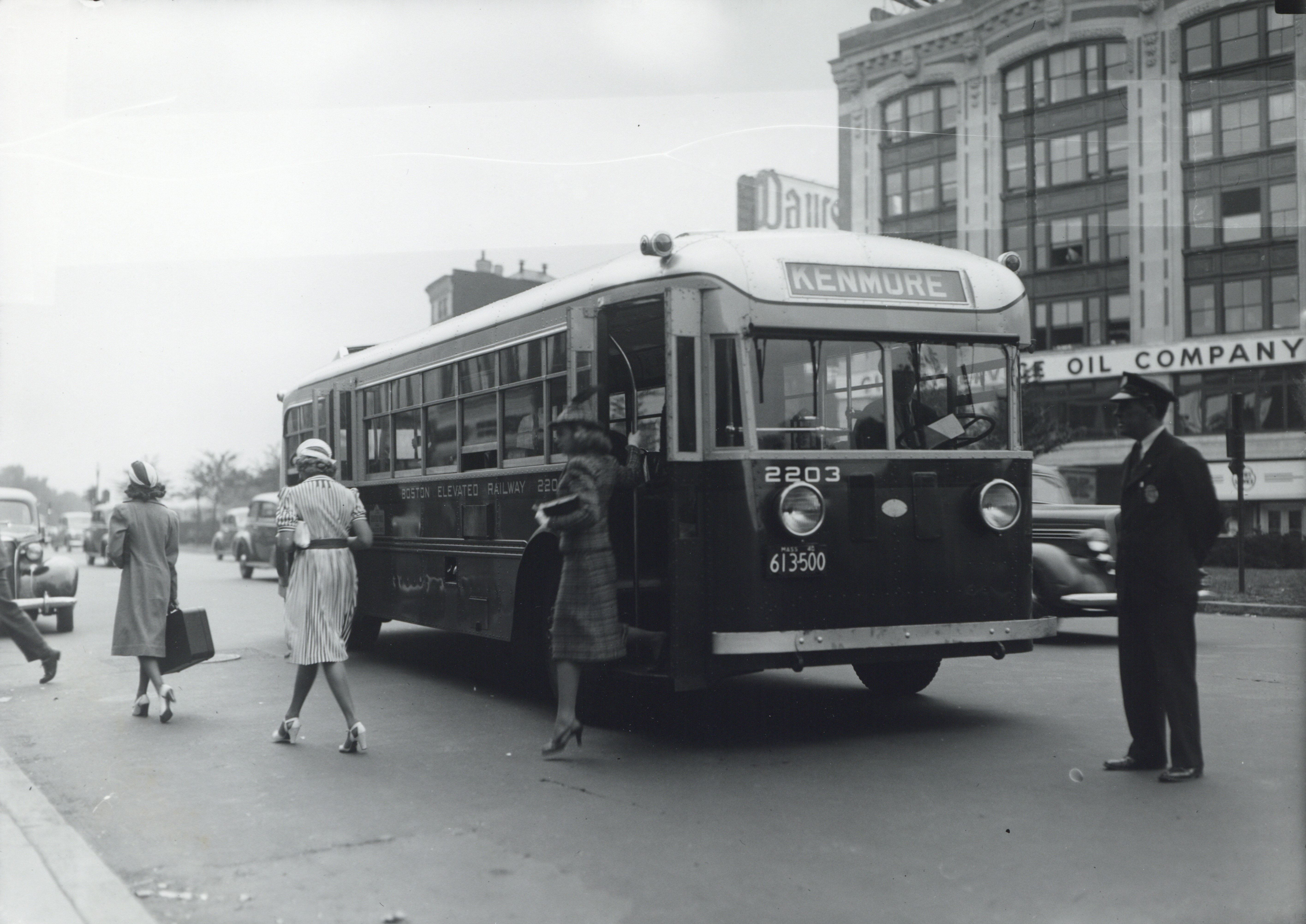
A route 58 or 60 bus at Kenmore Square in the 1940s

When the Chestnut Hill streetcar service was discontinued effective November 26, 1932, replacement buses operated between Chestnut Hill and Brookline Village. The March 20, 1933 changes added a Brookline Village–Kenmore route on Brookline Avenue; it was soon through-routed with the Chestnut Hill route. A rush-hour short turn service operating between Kenmore Square and Boylston Street was added in mid-1933. When Cypress Street service via the Huntington Avenue line ended on June 10, 1934, a Cypress Street–Kenmore route was added. A loop on High Street, Highland Road, Jamaica Road, Pond Avenue, and Chestnut Street was added in 1935. The Boylston Street short turn was modified to run on Jersey Street by 1936; it was discontinued by 1942. In 1941, the Cypress Street route was assigned number 58, and the Chestnut Hill route became number 60. The loop of the Cypress Street was cut in 1942, but resumed postwar.

The Riverside Line opened in July 1959, and the bus routes were realigned to connect with it. Some route 60 trips had their inbound terminal cut back to Brookline Hills station, and all Cypress Street trips were cut to Brookline Hills as route 60A. A new route 58 operated between Brookline Village and Kenmore. Residents objected to buses looping on narrow streets in Brookline Hills; the routes were changed to terminate at Brookline Village by September 1960. The MTA discontinued free transfers on October 28, 1961, with many routes extended or through-routed to avoid double fares. The Chestnut Hill and Cypress Street routes were re-extended to Kenmore Square, with the Cypress Street route renumbered back to 58.

The two routes were combined as route 60 in September 1969; buses ran on Chestnut Street and High Street except at rush hour, when route 60A ran on the former route 58 alignment. Route 60A was discontinued in December 1985 (thus ending service on the Cypress Street loop), with route 60 operating via Cypress and High at all times. In December 2006, the outer terminal was extended slightly to the Chestnut Hill Mall. The MBTA continues to operate the route as 60 Chestnut Hill–Kenmore station. The 2018–19 review found that the route was largely sound, but suffered from poor reliability and inconsistent scheduled headways. A short curtailment of the outer end to a stop at the new Chestnut Hill Square development was recommended, which would allow for increased frequency. The MBTA ultimately did not shorten the route in order to keep service to the mall, though the new stop was to be pursued.

The May 2022 draft network plan called for route 60 to be extended to Newton Centre via Langely Road, with increased frequency. The November 2022 draft network plan called for route 60 to maintain its existing routing.

==== 65 ====
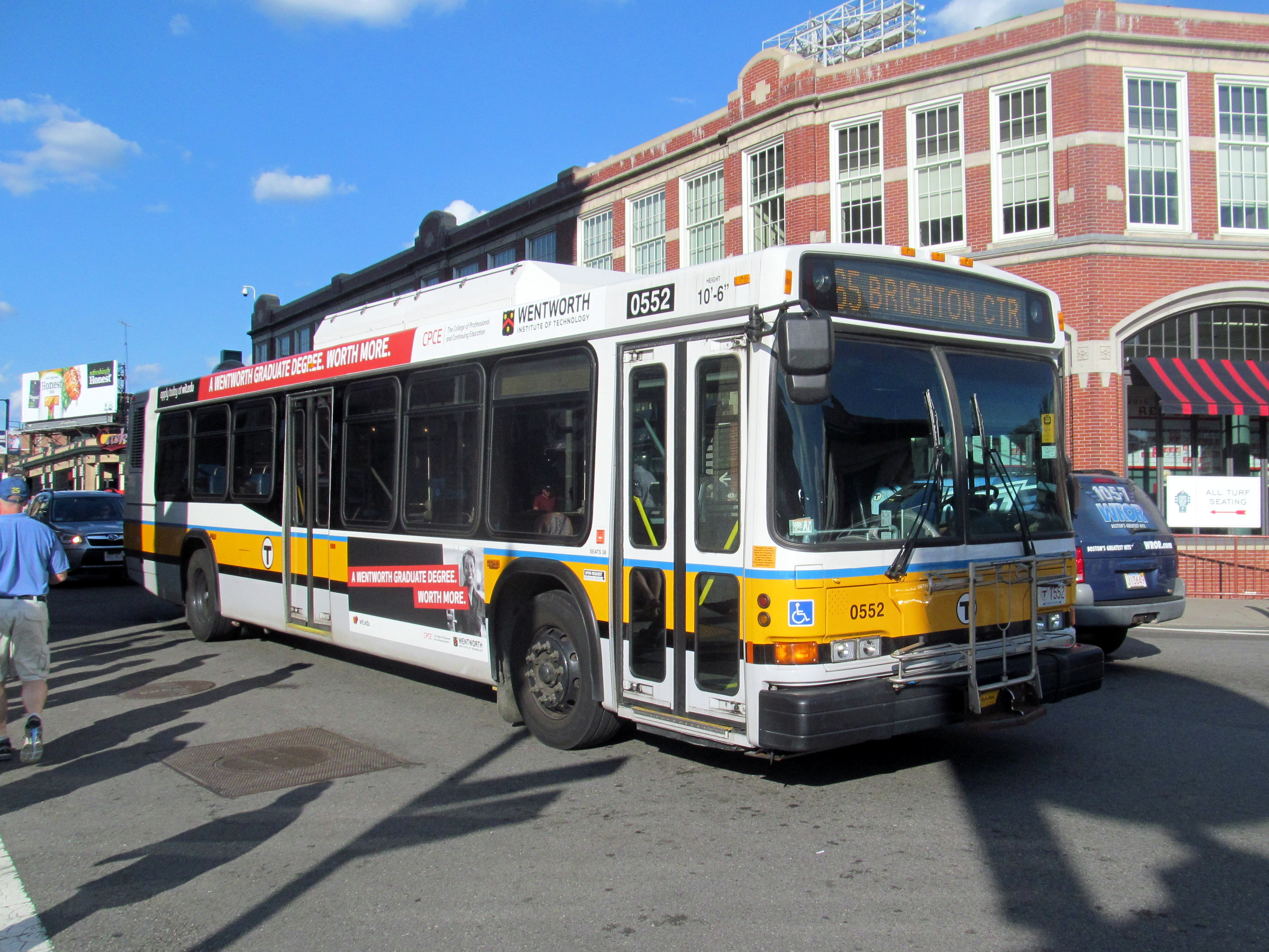
A route 65 bus on Brookline Avenue in 2016

Streetcar service on Washington Street between Brookline Village and Washington Square was originally a branch of the Huntington Avenue line, running to Boston College via Beacon Street. The line was shortened to Lake Street–Brookline Village on February 6, 1922 and was converted to bus in 1926. In mid-1928, the west end of the route was realigned onto Washington Street to Brighton Center – a routing that had been proposed as a streetcar line in the 1890s. The former tracks on Washington Street were removed in 1940. The route was assigned number 65 in 1941. Saturday service was discontinued in March 1953 and restored in September 1979. The route was extended to Kenmore in October 1961 upon the discontinuance of free transfers, running on Brookline Avenue along with routes 58 and 60.

The 2018–19 review found that the route suffered from poor reliability, high crowding at peak hours, and a lack of Sunday service. Unlike other crosstown routes, peak-hour demand is largely unidirectional. The inner terminal was proposed to be changed to Ruggles, with buses running on Longwood Avenue, Huntington Avenue, and Ruggles Street (an alignment already used by the CT2). The change would provide an Orange Line connection and add additional service to the Longwood Medical Area. However, the MBTA opted to delay the proposal pending further review of the system.

The May 2022 draft network plan called for route 65 to become an extension of route 15, forming a high-frequency Oak Square–Fields Corner route. The portion of the route on Brookline Avenue north of the Fenway would be discontinued, though other routes would continue to serve that section. The November 2022 draft network plan called for route 65 to run between Brighton Center and Ruggles, with route 15 still terminating at Ruggles. The change took place effective September 6, 2026. The span of service and frequency on weekdays and Saturdays were increased; Sunday service was added. The MBTA continues to operate the route as 65 Brighton Center–Ruggles station.
