= MBTA crosstown bus routes =

Bus routes in Greater Boston

The Massachusetts Bay Transportation Authority (MBTA) began operating three specially designated crosstown bus route in the Boston metropolitan area in 1994. Intended as a limited-stop bus connecting major points, the weekday-only routes largely paralleled MBTA bus local routes, but with fewer stops to reduce travel times. Only one of the three routes – route CT3 – still operates.

The three crosstown routes – CT1, CT2, and CT3 – began operation in 1994. Eight additional routes numbered CT4 through CT11 were proposed in 2001 as part of an interim phase of the Urban Ring Project to provide circumferential service bypassing the crowded downtown subway stations, but were never put in service. Route CT1 was merged with route 1 in 2019. Route CT2 was merged with route 85 in 2026. Route CT3 is planned to be replaced by a new route 12 in the late 2020s.

== System development ==
Geographic map of MBTA crosstown bus routes as originally introduced. The CT1 is colored aqua, the CT2 navy, and the CT3 peach.

The need for better circumferential transit in Boston was raised by the 1972 Boston Transportation Planning Review. The 1989 Circumferential Transit Feasibility Study began planning for the Urban Ring Project, which was to be a high-capacity circumferential line connecting hubs including Logan Airport, Kendall Square, and the Longwood Medical Area (LMA) outside downtown Boston. In December 1993, an MBTA report recommended the operation of Kendall Square–Ruggles station and LMA–Andrew station bus routes as an interim step. The MBTA announced plans for a three-route pilot program in May 1994. It was to include two previously proposed routes plus a Central Square–Boston Medical Center route, all operating with limited stops.

The three crosstown routes began operation on September 26, 1994. The Central–Boston Medical Center route was designated CT1, the Kendall–Ruggles route CT2, and the LMA–Andrew route CT3. In January 1995, governor Bill Weld vetoed several sections of a transportation bond bill, including a truck ban on MDC parkways. The ban would have also applied to buses, affecting the crosstown bus routes. By October 1995, the routes averaged 3,700 daily boardings – half of the projected 7,500. They cost $1 million annually (equivalent to $2.1 million in 2025) to operate.

In September 2000, the MBTA introduced a set of changes intended to distinguish the crosstown routes from other MBTA bus local routes. Accessible buses were assigned to the routes; they had automatic stop announcements and electronic headsigns. The buses were fitted with bicycle racks and had special crosstown livery and logos. Riders were given 25-cent transfers to the MBTA subway system. (At that time, there were not normally discounted transfers between bus and subway.) Route CT2 was also extended to Sullivan Square.

Eight additional routes numbered CT4 through CT11 were proposed in 2001 as part of an interim phase of the Urban Ring to provide circumferential service bypassing the crowded downtown subway stations, but were never put in service.

In 2018–19, the MBTA conducted a review of its bus system that culminated in a set of short-term recommendations, including the discontinuance of route CT1. The MBTA Board approved the changes in May 2019; route CT1 was discontinued that September. The MBTA released a draft plan for a systemwide network redesign in May 2022, followed by a revised plan that November. Both plans called for routes CT2 and CT3 to be replaced with local bus routes. Route CT2 was discontinued in April 2026.

== CT1 ==
Route CT1
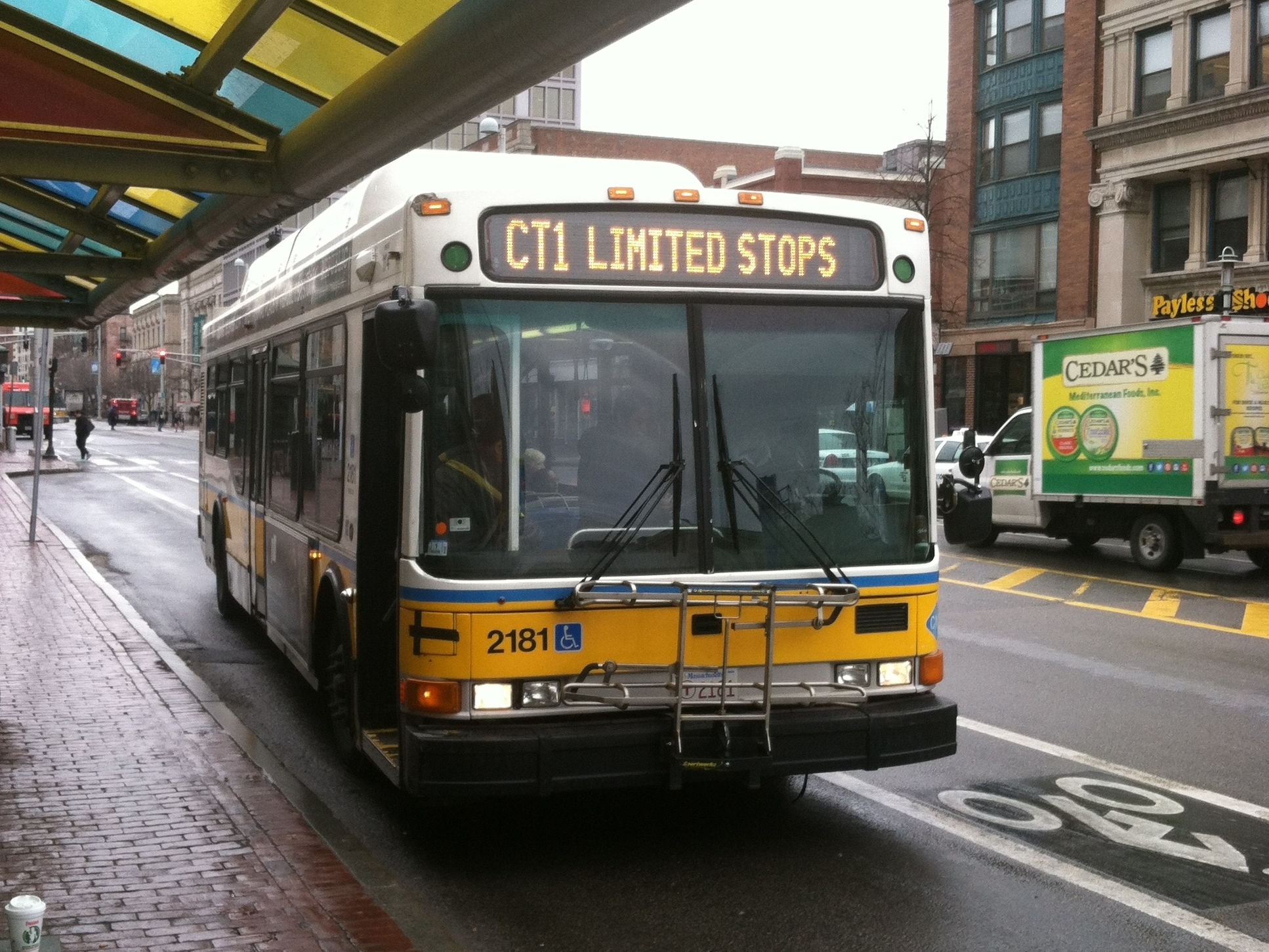
- A southbound route CT1 bus at Central Square in 2015

Overview
- Garage: Albany Garage
- Began service: September 26, 1994
- Ended service: September 1, 2019

Route
- Locale: Boston and Cambridge, Massachusetts
- Start: Central Square, Cambridge
- End: Boston Medical Center
- Length: 3.2 miles (5.1 km) southbound; 3.4 miles (5.5 km) northbound
- Daily ridership: 1,994 (2018)

Route CT1 (internally coded 701) ran between Central Square in Cambridge and Boston Medical Center (BMC), mostly along Massachusetts Avenue. From Central Square, it ran southeast on Massachusetts Avenue through the Massachusetts Institute of Technology (MIT) campus and across the Harvard Bridge into Boston. It continued southeast through the Back Bay and South End neighborhoods. It turned northeast on Albany Street and looped through the BMC campus on East Newton Street, Harrison Avenue, and East Concord Street. The majority of its route, save for the BMC loop, was a limited-stop version of route 1.

Service was not substantially modified after its 1994 inception. The 2018–19 MBTA review found that route CT1 had poor reliability; it had limited frequency and was not coordinated with route 1, leading to the routes being duplicative rather than complementary. The review recommended that route CT1 be discontinued in favor of increased service on route 1 in order to provide more consistent service across the corridor. The two routes were merged on September 1, 2019, resulting in increased frequency on route 1.

At the time of its discontinuance, route CT1 ran from about 6:00 am to 7:00 am on weekdays only, with headways varying between 20 and 35 minutes. Scheduled one-way running times ranged from 20 minutes in the early morning to 45 minutes in the afternoon peak. The route operated with standard 40-foot (12 m) transit buses based at Albany Garage in Boston. Daily ridership was 1,994 in 2018.

=== Stop listing ===
Stop	Major connections
Central Square	Red Line
Pearl Street	
University Park	
Massachusetts Institute of Technology	
Beacon Street	
Hynes Convention Center station	Green Line (B, C, D)
Symphony station	Green Line (E)
Massachusetts Avenue station	Orange Line
Washington Street	Silver Line (SL4, SL5)
Harrison Avenue	
Boston Medical Center	

== CT2 ==
Route CT2
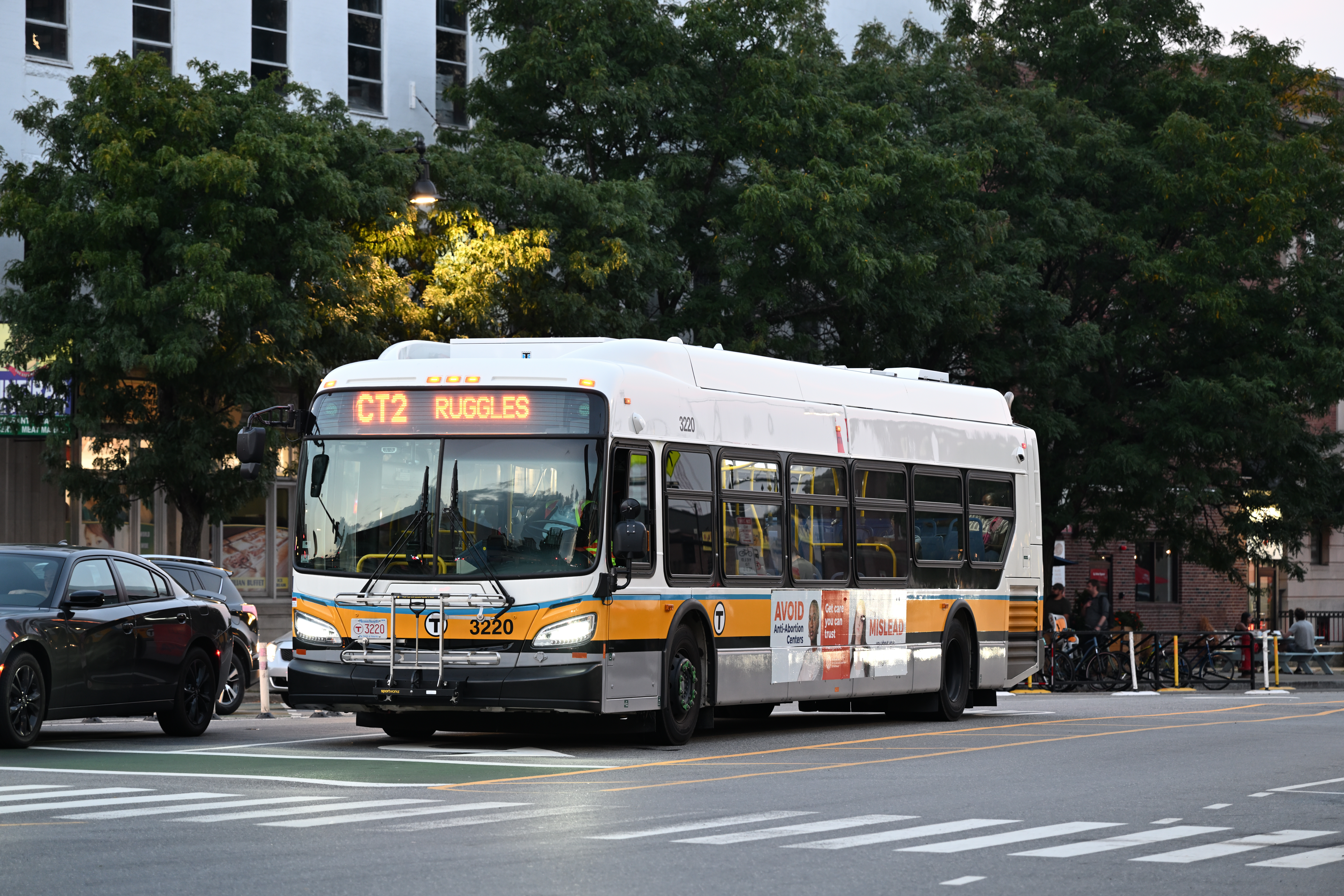
- A route CT2 bus at Union Square, Somerville, in 2024

Overview
- System: MBTA bus
- Garage: Albany Garage and Cabot Garage
- Began service: September 26, 1994
- Ended service: April 5, 2026

Route
- Locale: Boston, Cambridge, and Somerville, Massachusetts
- Start: Sullivan Square station
- End: Ruggles station
- Length: 6.5 miles (10.5 km) northbound; 6.3 miles (10.1 km) southbound
- Daily ridership: 2,000 (2018)

Route CT2 (internally coded 747) ran between Sullivan Square station in Charlestown and Ruggles station in Roxbury – both in Boston – via parts of Cambridge and Somerville. The southern part of the route roughly paralleled route 47. From Sullivan Square, it ran west on Washington Street to Union Square, then south to Kendall Square via Webster Avenue, Windsor Street, Hampshire Street, and Broadway (paralleling route 85). It continued west on Main Street, Vassar Street, Amesbury Street, and Memorial Drive through the MIT campus, then turned south to cross the Charles River on the Boston University Bridge. The route followed Mountfort Street, Park Drive, and Brookline Avenue south to the Longwood Medical Area, then Longwood Avenue, Huntington Avenue, and Ruggles Street east to Ruggles station. Sullivan-bound buses used parallel streets at several locations.

Route CT2 initially operated between Ruggles and Kendall/MIT station. In June 1998, Ruggles-bound buses began using Amesbury Street rather than the westernmost portion of Vassar Street. On September 5, 2000, the route was extended to Sullivan Square via Union Square, following the routings of routes 85 and 91. In December 2018, the Kendall Square stop was moved from Kendall/MIT station to Ames Street, eliminating a loop at the station.

The 2018–19 MBTA review found that route CT2 had poor reliability with just 43% of trips operating on schedule. Although initially intended to supplement route 47 for access to the Longwood Medical Area, it had also become used for service to Kendall Square, particularly from the north. No near-term changes were recommended, though scheduled running times were adjusted in 2018 to improve reliability.

The May 2022 draft plan called for route CT2 to be discontinued. Portions of the route were to be covered by extensions of routes 109 and 39 with higher frequency. The revised proposal called for route CT2 to be replaced by route 85. It was to follow the existing CT2 routing between Ruggles and Union Square, then continue to Assembly Square via Cross Street and Broadway. Route CT2 was replaced with route 85 on April 5, 2026. Unlike the 2022 proposal, the new 85 followed the existing CT2 routing between Union Square and Sullivan Square, and terminated on Grand Union Boulevard rather than at Assembly station. It also made all stops rather than the limited stops of the CT2.

At the time of its discontinuance, route CT2 ran from about 6:00 am to 7:30 pm on weekdays only, with headways varying between 18 and 60 minutes. Scheduled one-way running times ranged from 35 minutes in the early morning to 55 minutes in the afternoon peak. The route operated with standard 40-foot (12 m) transit buses based at Albany Garage and Cabot Garage in Boston. Daily ridership was approximately 2,000 in 2018.

=== Stop listing ===
Stop	Major connections
Sullivan Square station	Orange Line
Cobble Hill	
McGrath Highway	
Union Square	
Cambridge Street	
Portland Street	
Kendall Square	Red Line
Massachusetts Avenue	
Pacific Street Extension	
Memorial Drive	
Boston University	Green Line (B)
Park and Beacon Streets	Green Line (C)
Fenway station	Green Line (D)
Beth Israel Hospital	
Children's Hospital	
Longwood Avenue at Huntington Avenue	Green Line (E)
Ruggles Street at Huntington Avenue	Green Line (E)
Ruggles station	Orange Line, MBTA Commuter Rail

== CT3 ==
Route CT3
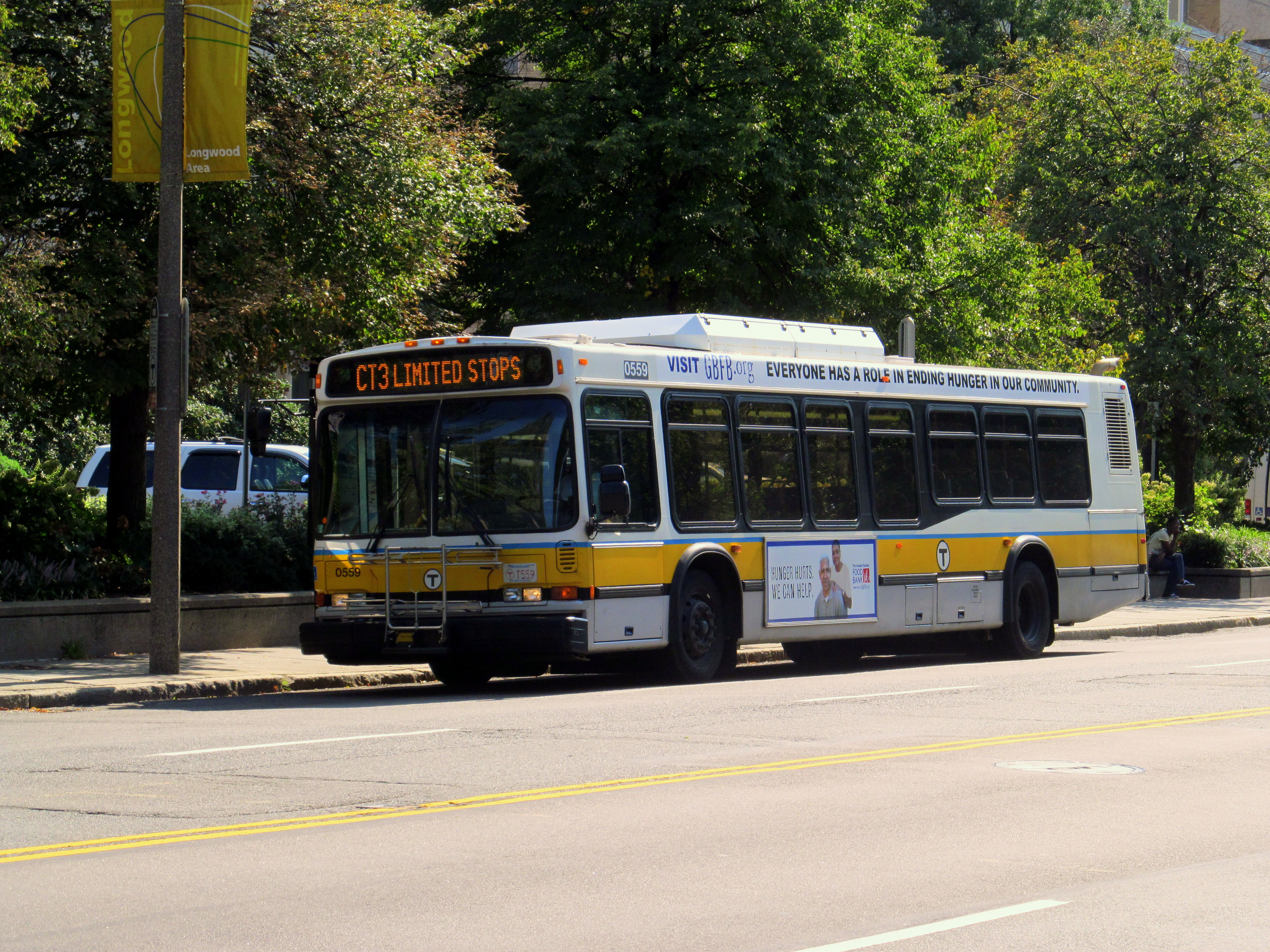
- A route CT3 bus on Brookline Avenue in 2012

Overview
- Garage: Albany Garage and Cabot Garage
- Began service: September 26, 1994

Route
- Locale: Boston, Massachusetts
- Start: Longwood Medical Area
- End: Andrew station
- Length: 4.4 miles (7.1 km) inbound; 3.9 miles (6.3 km) outbound
- Daily ridership: 1,280 (2018)
- Timetable: CT3

Route CT3 (internally coded 708) operates between Longwood Medical Area (LMA) and Andrew station entirely within the city of Boston, roughly paralleling route 8. From Andrew station, it runs west on Southampton Street (some trips via Newmarket Square) and northeast on Albany Street to Boston Medical Center, then southwest on Harrison Avenue and west on Melnea Cass Boulevard to Ruggles station. It continues west on Ruggles Street and Fenway, then makes a one-way clockwise loop through the LMA on Avenue Louis Pasteur, Longwood Avenue, Brookline Avenue, and Fenway. As of September 2026, the route has 22-minute headways at peak hours and 70-minute headways midday; it does not have evening or weekend service. The route operates with standard 40-foot (12 m) transit buses based at Albany Garage and Cabot Garage in Boston.

The CT3 route originally operated between Andrew and the LMA; it was extended to Logan Airport in December 1998. On September 4, 1999, the MBTA made several service expansions using a federal "access to jobs" grant. Weekend, early-morning, and night service began operating on the Andrew–Logan Airport segment of route CT3. The extension (internally coded 709) was dropped due to low ridership in March 2002. Two early morning trips were kept as route 171, running from Dudley to Logan. They are through-routed with route 15 trips.

In January 2005, some rush hour service (eastbound in the morning and westbound in the afternoon) was rerouted to serve Newmarket Square. Peak-hour short turn trips operating only between Andrew station and Boston Medical Center were added in January 2012. In September 2013, those trips began operating only in the peak direction – westbound to Boston Medical Center in the morning and eastbound in the afternoon.

The 2018–19 MBTA review found that route CT3 had poor reliability – among the worst in the system – with just 43% of trips operating on schedule. Ridership was high on full-length trips at peak hours, but low during middays and on the short turn trips. The route had 1,280 daily riders. No short-term changes to the route were recommended. The short turn trips were eliminated in June 2019; frequency was increased on the full-length trips. In 2025, route SL3 was the fifth-slowest MBTA bus route, with average speed of 6.45 miles per hour (10.38 km/h).

The May 2022 draft network plan called for route CT3 to be discontinued. It was to be largely replaced by a modified route 10 running to Ruggles, as well as a new Brookline Village–Courthouse route 12 running via Huntington Avenue, Ruggles station, Andrew station, and D Street. The November 2022 revised plan called for route 12 to run via Roxbury Crossing station and Nubian station, leaving route 10 as the primary replacement for route CT3.

=== Stop listing ===
Stop	Major connections	MBTA bus connections
Avenue Louis Pasteur		8, 19, 47
Children's Hospital		8, 19, 47, 85
Beth Israel Hospital		8, 19, 47, 60, 65, 85
Ruggles Street at Huntington Avenue	Green Line (E)	8, 19, 39, 47, 85
Ruggles station	Orange Line, MBTA Commuter Rail	8, 15, 19, 22, 23, 28, 43, 44, 45, 47, 85
Washington Street	Silver Line (SL4, SL5)	1, 8, 19, 47, 171
Harrison Street (Boston Medical Center)		8, 10, 47
Boston Medical Center		8, 10, 47, 171
Albany Street (Boston Medical Center)		1, 8, 10, 47
Magazine Street (limited service)		8, 10
Andrew station	Red Line	10, 16, 17, 18, 171

== See also ==
- List of MBTA bus routes
- List of key MBTA bus routes
