= Esmond Street Historic District =

Historic district in Massachusetts, United States

- U.S. National Register of Historic Places
- U.S. Historic district
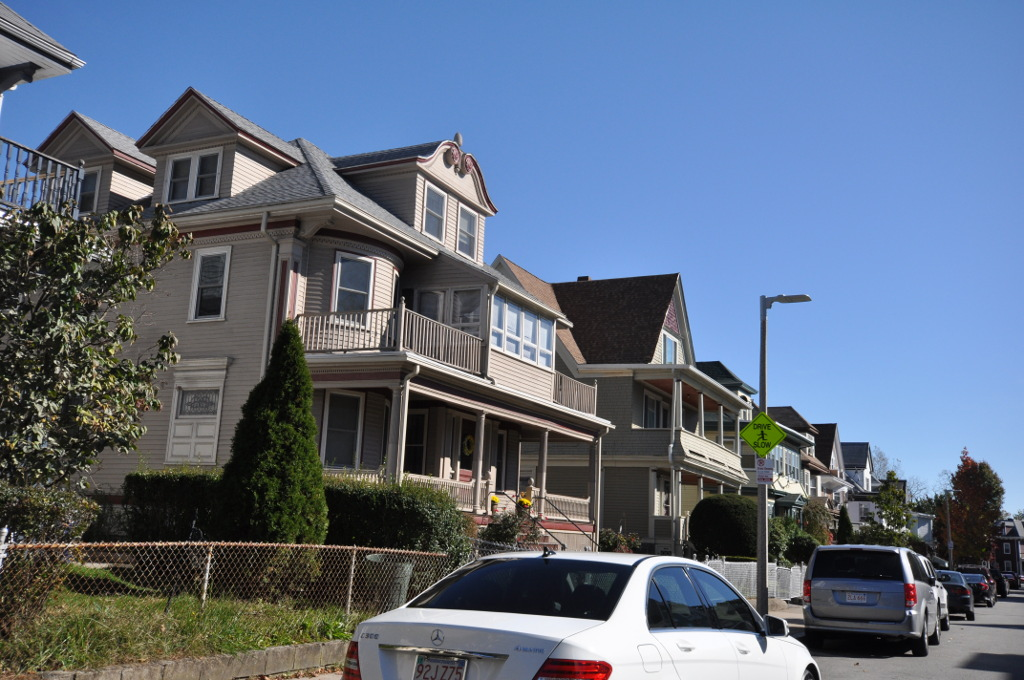

- Location within Massachusetts Location within the United States
- Location: Bicknell, Bradshaw, Esmond, & Harvard Sts., Boston, Massachusetts
- Coordinates: 42°17′51″N 71°5′2″W
- Area: 3.25 acres (1.32 ha)
- Built: 1884-1928
- Architect: Multiple
- Architectural style: Colonial Revival, Queen Anne
- NRHP reference No.: 100003070
- Added to NRHP: November 5, 2018

The Esmond Street Historic District is a historic district encompassing a small residential area in the Dorchester neighborhood of Boston, Massachusetts. Centered on a stretch of Esmond Street, the area was developed between 1884 and 1928, and includes a fine sample of Colonial Revival and Queen Anne architecture. The district was listed on the National Register of Historic Places in 2018.

== Description and history ==
Esmond Street is located in the central Dorchester area known as Franklin Field North, across Blue Hill Avenue from Franklin Park. Esmond Street extends roughly south from Blue Hill Avenue to Harvard Street, and is lined with residential construction. Most of this housing is single and two-family wood frame construction, with some houses also including a 20th-century garage. Stylistically, most of the buildings are Queen Anne or Colonial Revival. There are three brick apartment houses, each with more than 20 units. The only non-residential structures in the district are the former St. Leo's Catholic Church, a Colonial Revival building dating to 1902, and its associated structures, some of which were originally built as housing.

The Esmond Street area was developed in the late 19th century, partly in response to the opening of Franklin Park, part of the city's Emerald Necklace, and Harambee Park, a small neighborhood park to the south. The area's early residents were mainly Catholic Irish immigrants, leading to the construction of the church. This first wave was eventually supplanted by Jewish migration from the inner city to Dorchester in the 1920s and 1930s.

== See also ==
- National Register of Historic Places listings in southern Boston, Massachusetts
