= Fenway (parkway) =

Street in Boston, Massachusetts

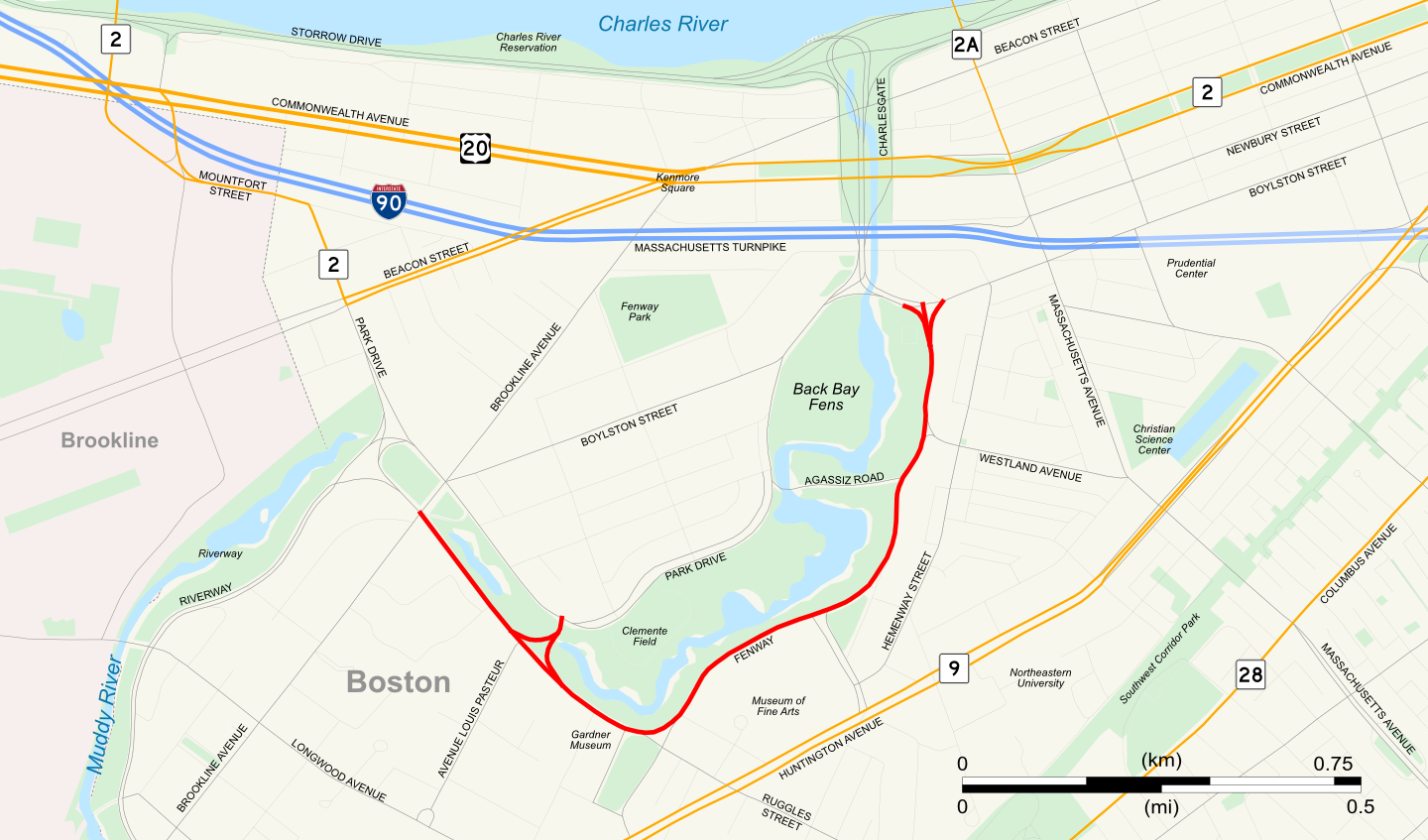
- Map with the Fenway highlighted in red.
- Interactive map of Fenway
- Maintained by: Department of Conservation and Recreation
- Length: 1.1 mi (1.8 km)
- Location: Emerald Necklace, Boston, Massachusetts
- West end: Riverway / Brookline Avenue in Longwood
- East end: Boylston Street in Fenway–Kenmore

Construction
- Inauguration: 1876

Other
- Designer: Frederick Law Olmsted

The Fenway is a mostly one-way, one-to three-lane parkway that runs along the southern and eastern edges of the Back Bay Fens in the Fenway–Kenmore neighborhood of Boston, in the east-central part of the U.S. state of Massachusetts. As part of the Emerald Necklace park system mainly designed by Frederick Law Olmsted in the late 19th century, the Fenway, along with the Back Bay Fens and Park Drive, connects the Commonwealth Avenue Mall to the Riverway. For its entire length, the parkway travels along the Muddy River and is part of the Metropolitan Park System of Greater Boston. Like others in the park system, it is maintained by the Massachusetts Department of Conservation and Recreation.

The first parkway of the Emerald Necklace to be constructed, the Fenway's name was coined from an early description of the park that it runs alongside. It was first thought that it would promote a high-class neighborhood, but a majority of its early structures were for educational institutions. Current organizations on the parkway's route include the Isabella Stewart Gardner Museum, the Museum of Fine Arts, and many colleges and universities.

== Route description ==
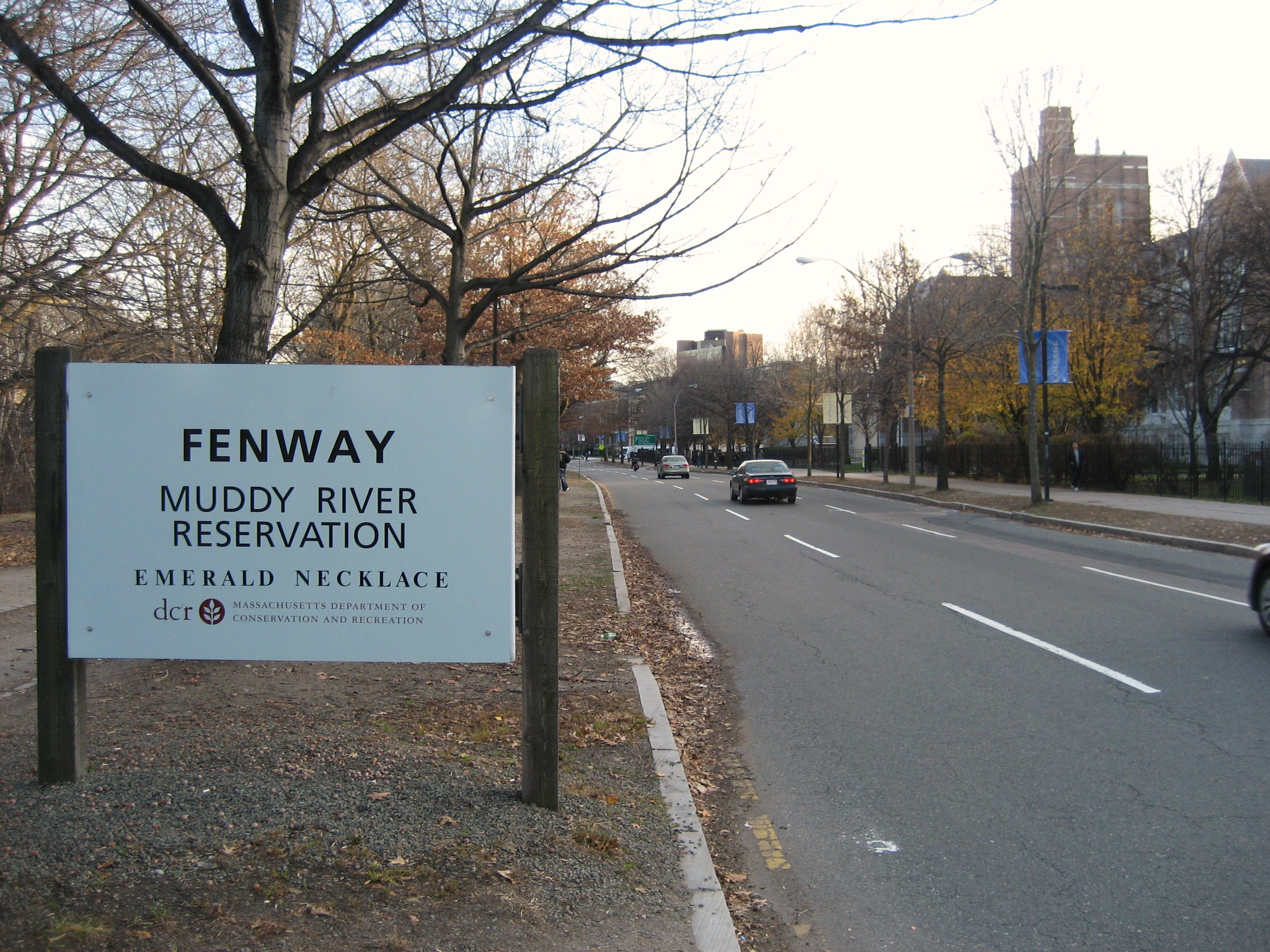
Westernmost end of the Fenway near Brookline Avenue.

The Fenway begins at the intersection of Brookline Avenue and the Riverway, heading southeast with three one-way lanes past Emmanuel College to an intersection with Avenue Louis Pasteur. From there, the left and right lanes become turn-only and the middle lane continues straight. Traffic in the left-turn-only lane changes direction and joins the paralleling Park Drive along with the oncoming traffic traveling northeast on the Fenway. After the turn-lane drops, the road becomes two-way with one lane in each direction past Simmons College and the Isabella Stewart Gardner Museum. It then turns northeast at Louis Prang Street and becomes a one-way two-lane road which passes the Museum of Fine Arts and parts of Northeastern University. A short spur connects the parkway to Westland Avenue and from there it continues as a two-way road with two lanes in each direction past Berklee College of Music and the Boston Conservatory, ending at Boylston Street. At the Boylston Street intersection stands a monument of journalist, novelist and poet John Boyle O'Reilly which was constructed in 1897.

The Fenway runs alongside the Muddy River for its entire length and the river continues in a stone-paved channel surrounded by a narrow strip of parklands, toward its connection with the Charles River. In a series of stone bridges and tunnels, it passes under Boylston Street, the Massachusetts Turnpike, Commonwealth Avenue, Storrow Drive, and a series of elevated connecting ramps known as the Bowker Overpass (Charlesgate) before joining the Charles. Park Drive, which is located on the other side of the Back Bay Fens, allows for continuous travel in the opposite direction of the Fenway. It begins near where the Fenway ends at Boylston Street and enters the same intersection at Brookline Avenue where the Fenway begins.

== History ==
=== Background ===
In 1875, the voters of the City of Boston and the Massachusetts legislature approved the creation of a park commission in order to promote the creation of public parks in the city. Frederick Law Olmsted, the landscape architect of New York City's Central Park, began to spend an increasing amount of time in the area and was asked by the park commission in the mid-to-late 1870s to be the judge of a 23-entry design competition to build a new park. Olmsted felt that all of the submitted plans were subpar and either did not take into account flood control or focused too much on it and neglected the public park aspect. The Muddy River and Stony Brook flowed through the Back Bay Fens (the Fens) which were at the time subject to tidal flow, storm flooding, and sewage discharge. The disappointed park commission then asked Olmsted to be its professional adviser and main landscape architect. Under his direction, what is now called the Emerald Necklace took shape. He directed the Fens to be dredged, graded, planted, and turned into a seemingly natural salt marsh to absorb and clean the flowing waters. He then built a series of parks stretching from the Fens near the existing Commonwealth Avenue greenway to Franklin Park some miles away. The parks were connected to each other by scenic parkways, one of which is the Fenway around the eastern and southern sides of the Fens.

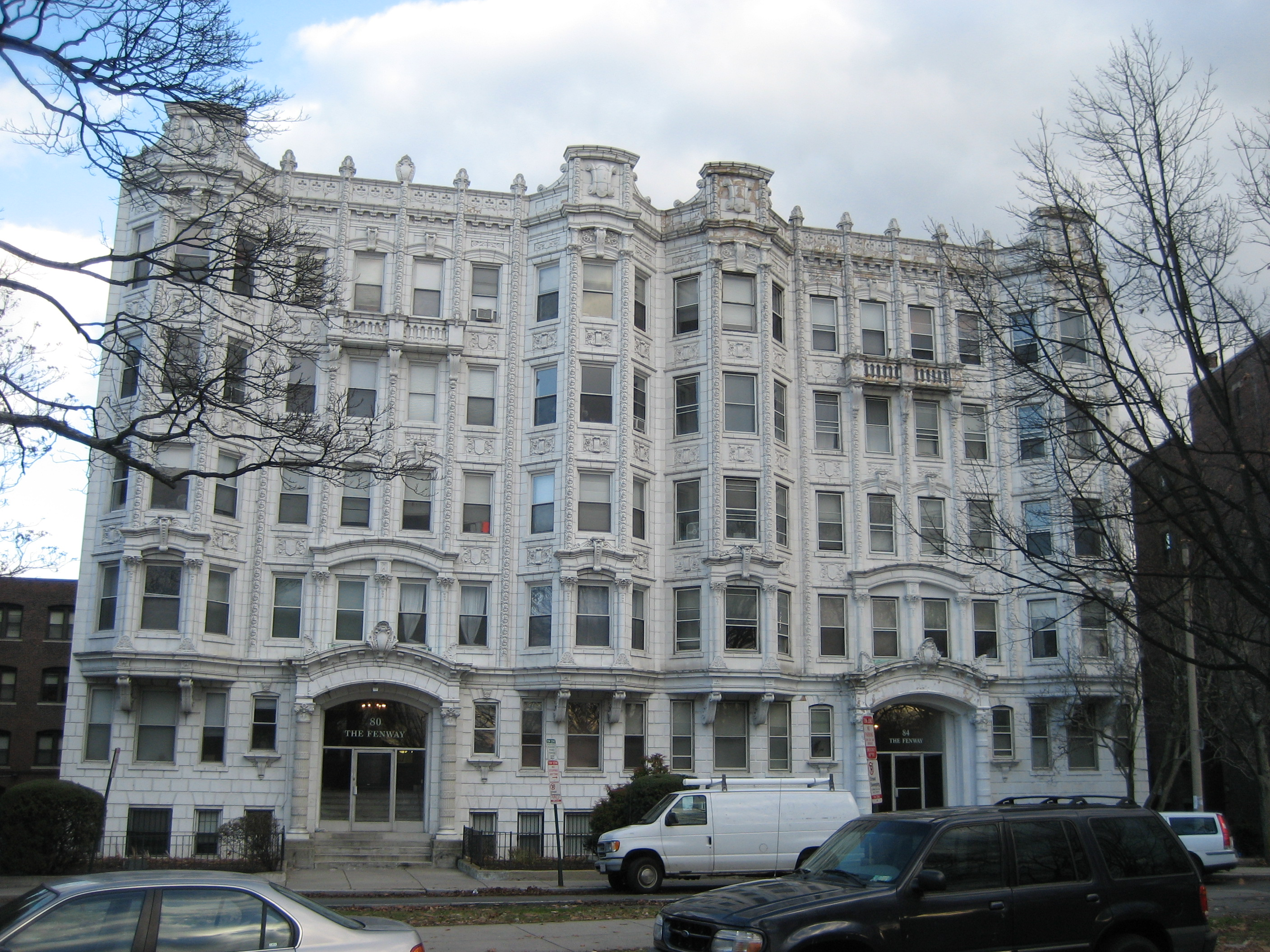
The ornate facades of the buildings at 80 and 84 Fenway.

When planned, it was thought that the buildings built upon the Fenway would house high-wealth residents and that the whole area would be a high-class neighborhood. As property values rose, however, it was educational institutions that sprung up along the Fenway's route. By 1907, there were twenty-two educationally focused organizations, including nine college and universities which had made their homes on the Fenway. Residential buildings that were built needed their frontages to be approved by the Park Board so that a "poor looking building [did not] depreciate the value of the whole neighborhood". Additionally, the Board had discretion on whether it felt a proposed building was suitable for frontage along the park and parkway. The hope of these building restrictions was that there would be an improvement in the look of the Fenway compared to neighboring streets.

As part of the Metropolitan Park System of Greater Boston, the Fenway is maintained by the Massachusetts Department of Conservation and Recreation (DCR), rather than the City of Boston.

=== Naming ===
In 1887, the stretch of parkways from Boylston Street to Jamaica Pond were originally referred to as a single group called "the Parkway" by the Boston Park Commissioner, with the current names Fenway, Jamaicaway, and Riverway being authorized by the park commission later that year. Provisional names for the Fenway suggested in 1885 included Rumford, Longview, and Riverdale, although the park commission deemed that naming should pass the following criteria. For the entire parkway system, each roadway name had to end in a consistent manner, "naturally aid[ing] in making the idea of continuity and unity familiar to the public, and, if such termination were short, simple and common, it would be in various ways a convenience". Additionally they wished for the names to be "derived from some topographical or historical local circumstance". For example, "instead of [a parkway] being called the Riverdale Road [it should] be called Riverway". In an 1879 report outlining the plan for the parks and roadways, the area through which the Fenway would travel was described as a "fenny meadow". The park commission subsequently chose the "Back Bay Fens" as the name for the park and "Fenway" as the name for the parkway because it traveled through it.

=== Construction ===
The Fenway was the first of the Olmsted parkways to be built and work began on it in the 1880s, while work on the others began in the 1890s. Work started at the Boylston Street connection and much of the curbstone and gutters in the area had been laid by 1885. By 1888, the roadway was complete from Boylston Street to Westland Avenue, but was prevented from continuing further south because of a delay in securing more fill. The Boston City Engineer's report cited a hold up in acquiring property from there to the Brookline Avenue terminus, as the problem since the fill was the dredged material from the new path of the Muddy River. Work continued after the remainder of the land was acquired and the roadway was complete up to the intersection of Parker and Huntington Avenue (today Forsyth Way at the Museum of Fine Arts) by 1890. Construction of the parkway concluded in early 1893 and the completed length of the Fenway opened shortly after.

== Major intersections ==
The entire route is in the Fenway–Kenmore neighborhood of Boston, Suffolk County.

mi	km	Destinations	Notes
0.0	0.0	Riverway / Brookline Avenue	Continues east from Riverway
0.3	0.48	Park Drive	U-turn
1.1	1.8	Boylston Street to Storrow Drive / Commonwealth Avenue – Kenmore Square	Via Charlesgate
1.000 mi = 1.609 km; 1.000 km = 0.621 mi
