= Riverway =

Parkway in Boston, Massachusetts

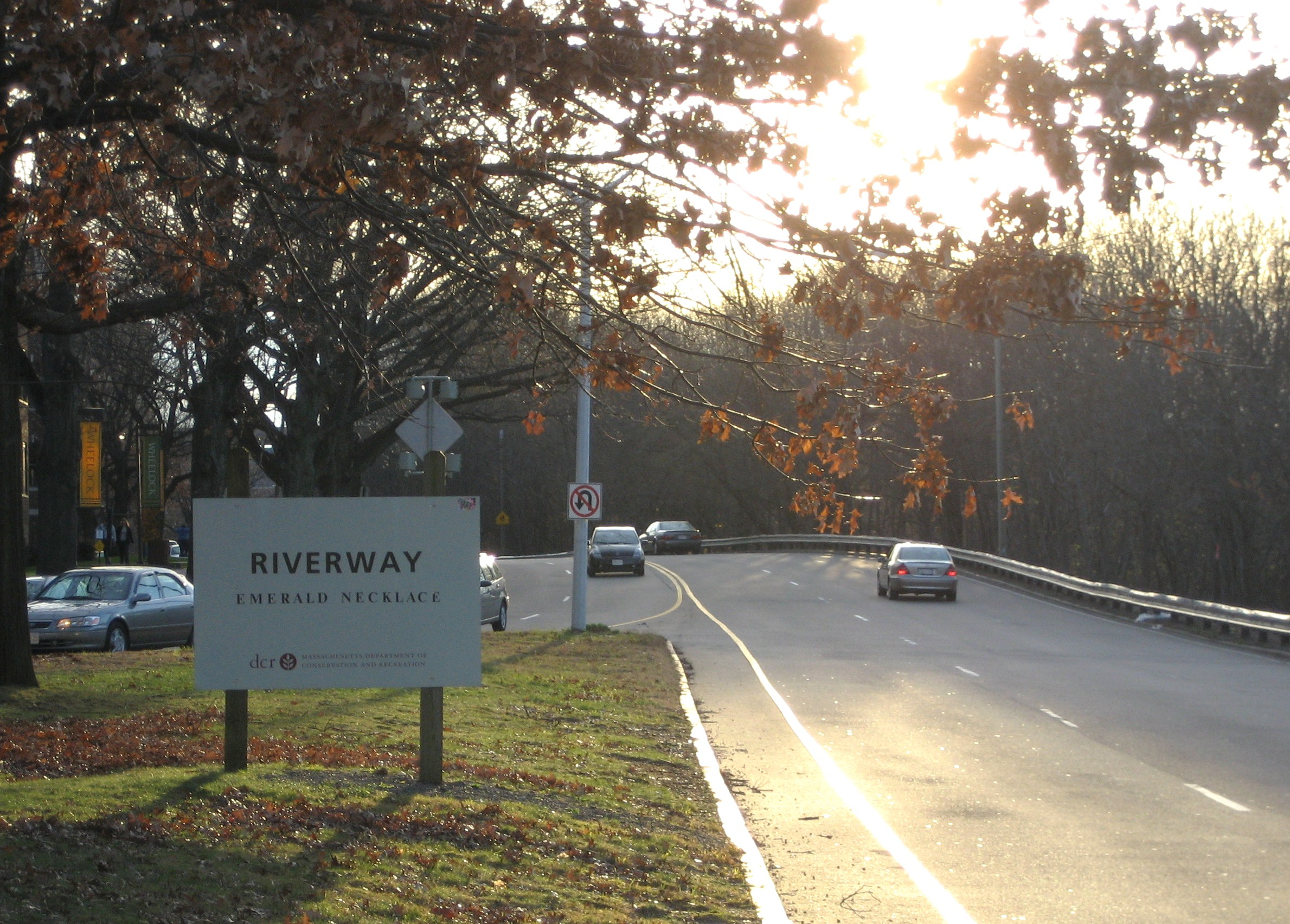
- Northerly end of the Riverway near Park Drive.
- Interactive map of Riverway
- Maintained by: Department of Conservation and Recreation
- Length: 1.1 mi (1.8 km)
- Location: Emerald Necklace, Boston, Massachusetts
- South end: Route 9 / Jamaicaway in Mission Hill
- North end: Park Drive in Fenway-Kenmore

Other
- Designer: Frederick Law Olmsted

The Riverway is a parkway in Boston, Massachusetts. The parkway is a link in the Emerald Necklace system of parks and parkways designed by Frederick Law Olmsted in the 1890s. Starting at the Landmark Center end of the Back Bay Fens, the parkway follows the path of the Muddy River south to Olmsted Park across a stone bridge over Route 9 near Brookline Village. The road and its associated park form Boston's western border with neighboring Brookline and are popular with nearby local residents in both municipalities.

== Major intersections ==
The entire route is in Boston, Suffolk County.

Location	mi	km	Destinations	Notes
Mission Hill	0.0	0.0	Route 9 east / Jamaicaway south – Copley Square	Grade-separated interchange; northern terminus of Jamaicaway
Mission Hill	0.4	0.64	Brookline Avenue – Longwood	Left turn restrictions in both directions
Fenway–Kenmore	1.0	1.6	Fenway east	Western terminus of Fenway; one-way eastbound
Fenway–Kenmore	1.1	1.8	Park Drive	
1.000 mi = 1.609 km; 1.000 km = 0.621 mi: Incomplete access
