= List of Massachusetts Bay Transportation Authority yards =

The Massachusetts Bay Transportation Authority uses a number of yards and facilities for maintenance and storage of its road and rail fleets.

== Active yards ==
=== Bus ===
Location of MBTA bus facilities
1 Albany Street Garage
2 Arborway Yard
3 Cabot Garage
4 Charlestown and Somerville
5 Everett Shops
6 Fellsway Garage
7 Lynn Garage
8 North Cambridge Carhouse
9 Quincy Garage
10 Southampton
11 Watertown Yard

Many of these facilities are former streetcar carhouses that were gradually converted to trackless trolley and bus use, although some like Southampton (built 2004) are of recent construction. Of the former streetcar carhouses, only Arborway and Watertown were Green Line yards during part of the MBTA era. Everett was an Orange Line yard until 1975.

Name	Location	Routes served
Albany Street Garage	Albany Street, South End, Boston	Local, Mass Pike Express, and crosstown routes
Arborway Yard	Washington Street, Jamaica Plain, Boston	Local bus routes; former terminus of the Green Line E branch
Cabot Garage	Dorchester Avenue, South Boston	Local bus routes
Charlestown Garage	Arlington Avenue, Charlestown, Boston	Local bus routes
Everett Shops	Broadway, Everett	Heavy repair for buses and for subway components; former Orange Line terminus and yard
Fellsway Garage	Salem Street, Medford	Local bus routes
Lynn Garage	Western Avenue, Lynn	Local bus routes; North Shore express routes
North Cambridge Carhouse	Massachusetts Avenue, North Cambridge	Formerly storage and maintenance for Harvard-based trolleybus routes; being converted for battery buses
Quincy Garage	Hancock Street, Quincy	Quincy-based local bus routes
Somerville Garage at Charlestown	Arlington Avenue, Charlestown, Boston	Local bus routes
Southampton Bus Maintenance Facility	Southampton Street, South Bay, Boston	Silver Line dual mode buses; local bus routes
Watertown Yard	Galen Street, Watertown	Midday layover for local bus routes; former terminus of the Green Line A branch and Green Line heavy maintenance facility

=== Subway ===
Location of MBTA subway yards
1 Alewife Yard
2 Bowdoin Yard
3 Cabot Yard
4 Caddigan Yard
5 Codman Yard
6 GLX VMF
7 Lake Street Yard
8 Mattapan Yard
9 North Station Yard
10 Orient Heights Yard
11 Reservoir Yard
12 Riverside Yard
13 Wellington Yard

The subway lines each have one maintenance facility (except for three on the Green Line) and often several other yards used for overnight and midday storage. Tail tracks for temporary storage of trains are also present at Forest Hills (Orange Line) and Wonderland (Blue Line); the Green Line has sidings at Heath Street, Blandford Street, and Northeastern University.

Name	Location	Route	Use
Alewife Yard	north of Alewife	Red Line	layover/storage
Bowdoin Yard	west of Bowdoin	Blue Line	layover/storage
Cabot Yard	near Broadway	Red Line	maintenance and storage
Caddigan Yard	south of Braintree	Red Line (Braintree branch)	layover/storage
Codman Yard	south of Ashmont	Red Line (Ashmont branch)	layover/storage
Green Line Extension Vehicle Maintenance Facility	Inner Belt District	Green Line (D and E branches)	maintenance and storage
Lake Street Yard	at Boston College	Green Line (B branch)	maintenance and storage
Mattapan Yard	at Mattapan	Mattapan Line	maintenance and storage
North Station Yard	at North Station	Green Line	layover and storage
Orient Heights Yard	east of Orient Heights	Blue Line	maintenance and storage
Reservoir Yard	between Reservoir and Cleveland Circle	Green Line (C branch and D branch)	maintenance and storage
Riverside Yard	at Riverside	Green Line (D branch)	maintenance and storage
Wellington Yard	at Wellington	Orange Line	maintenance and storage

=== Commuter rail ===
All MBTA Commuter Rail lines except the Lowell Line have a dedicated layover near the end of the line. Most provide ground power and other facilities, allowing trainsets to be stored overnight; others are simply several yard tracks off the mainline. The MBTA has one heavy maintenance facility on the northside, plus two light maintenance facilities on the southside. Equipment is transferred between the two sides via the Grand Junction Railroad.

Location of MBTA Commuter Rail facilities
1 Bradford Layover
2 Franklin Layover
3 Greenbush Layover
4 Kingston Layover
5 MBTA Commuter Rail Maintenance Facility
6 Middleboro Layover
7 Needham Layover
8 Newburyport Layover
9 Pawtucket Layover
10 Readville Interim Repair Facility
11 Rochester Maintenance Facility
12 Rockport Layover
13 Southampton Street Yard
14 Stoughton Layover
15 Wamsutta Layover
16 Weaver's Cove Layover
17 West Cambridge Maintenance Facility
18 Westminster Layover
19 Worcester Layover

Name	Location	Route	Use
Bradford Layover	at Bradford	Haverhill Line	layover/storage
Franklin Layover	east of Franklin	Franklin/Foxboro Line	layover/storage
Greenbush Layover	at Greenbush	Greenbush Line	layover/storage
Kingston Layover	at Kingston	Kingston Line	layover/storage
MBTA Commuter Rail Maintenance Facility	Inner Belt, Somerville	northside lines	Heavy maintenance for all commuter rail equipment; layover/storage
Middleboro Layover	at Middleborough	Fall River/New Bedford Line	layover/storage
Needham Layover	south of Needham Heights	Needham Line	layover/storage
Newburyport Layover	south of Newburyport	Newburyport/Rockport Line	layover/storage
Pawtucket Layover	Pawtucket, Rhode Island	Providence/Stoughton Line	layover/storage
Readville Interim Repair Facility	north of Readville	southside lines	Running maintenance and layover/storage. Expansion into a southside maintenance facility is planned.
Rochester Maintenance Facility	Cape Main Line in Rochester		Overhaul and maintenance
Rockport Layover	at Rockport	Newburyport/Rockport Line	layover/storage
Southampton Street Yard	south of South Station, Boston	southside lines	running maintenance and midday storage – primarily an Amtrak heavy maintenance facility
Stoughton Layover	at Stoughton	Providence/Stoughton Line	layover
Wamsutta Layover	North of New Bedford	Fall River/New Bedford Line	layover/storage
Weaver's Cove Layover	North of Fall River	Fall River/New Bedford Line	layover/storage
West Cambridge Maintenance Facility	south of Alewife	northside lines	Maintenance of way equipment storage
Westminster Layover	west of Wachusett	Fitchburg Line	layover/storage
Worcester Layover	east of Worcester	Framingham/Worcester Line	layover/storage

== Future yards ==
Location of future MBTA yards
1 Beacon Park Yard
2 Medford garage
3 Quincy Bus Maintenance Facility
4 Widett Circle

Name	Location	Routes served
Beacon Park Yard	At Beacon Park Yard	Midday layover for the Worcester Line. To be constructed as part of the realignment of I-90.
Medford garage	440 Riverside Avenue, Medford	Will replace Lynn Garage and Fellsway Garage. The MBTA purchased the property in August 2025.
Quincy Bus Maintenance Facility	North of Quincy Adams	Will replace Quincy Garage. Expected completion in summer 2027.
Widett Circle Layover Facility	Inside Widett Circle	Layover yard for southside lines. The first phase, a six-track facility for electric Fairmount Line trains, is planned to open in 2029.

== Former yards ==
Location of former MBTA Commuter Rail yards
1 Attleboro Layover
2 Fitchburg Layover
3 Haverhill Layover
4 Ipswich Layover
Location of former MBTA subway and bus yards (including subway yards converted to bus facilities)
1 Arborway Yard
2 Bennett Carhouse and Eliot Shops
3 Everett Shops
4 Forest Hills Shops
5 Lechmere Yard
6 Sullivan Square Shops
7 Watertown Yard
8 Bartlett Yard

Name	Location	Routes	Use	Closed & reason
Attleboro Layover	south of Attleboro	Providence/Stoughton Line	layover/storage	2006; replaced by Pawtucket Layover
Bennett Carhouse	south of Harvard Square, Cambridge	Harvard-based streetcar and trackless trolley routes	maintenance and storage	1970; Eliot Shops closed
Eliot Shops	south of Harvard Square, Cambridge	Red Line (also Blue Line from 1924–1952)	maintenance and storage	1970; redevelopment
Fitchburg Layover	east of Fitchburg	Fitchburg Line	layover/storage	2016; replaced by Wachusett Layover
Forest Hills Shops	south of Forest Hills	Orange Line	maintenance and storage	1987; completion of the southwest Corridor
Haverhill Layover	north of Haverhill	Haverhill Line	layover/storage	1987; replaced by Bradford Layover
Ipswich Layover	south of Ipswich	Newburyport/Rockport Line	layover/storage	1998; extension to Newburyport
Lechmere Yard	at Lechmere	Green Line	layover/storage	2020; relocation of Lechmere station
Sullivan Square Shops	at Sullivan Square	Orange Line and streetcars	maintenance and storage	1975; completion of the Haymarket North Extension
Bartlett Yard	Roxbury near Nubian Square	MBTA bus and streetcars	maintenance and storage	2005; operations moved to Arborway Yard in 2003
