= Park Drive (parkway) =

Street in Boston, Massachusetts

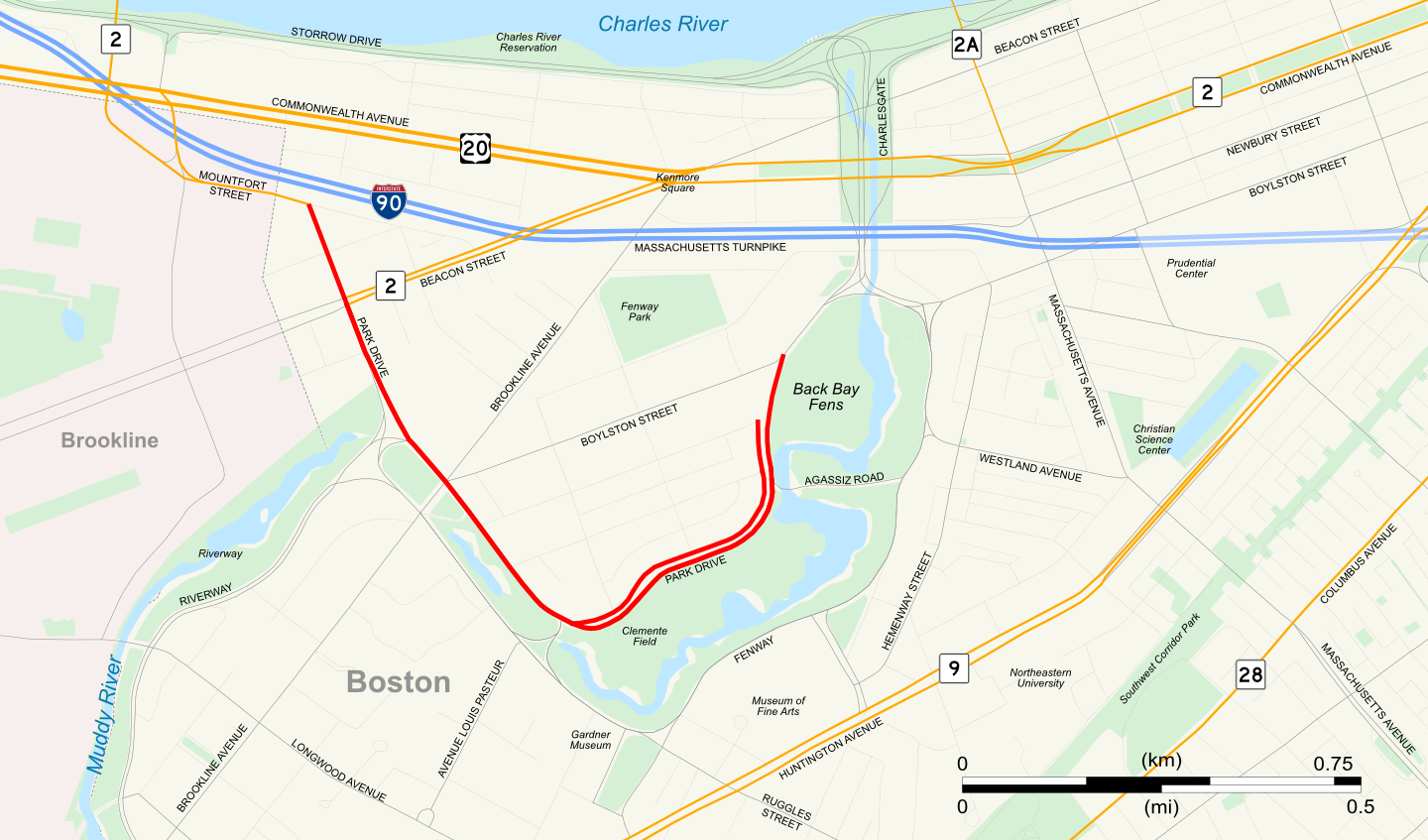
- Map with Park Drive highlighted in red.
- Interactive map of Park Drive
- Maintained by: Department of Conservation and Recreation
- Length: 1.1 mi (1.8 km)
- Location: Emerald Necklace, Boston, Massachusetts
- East end: Boylston Street in Fenway–Kenmore
- Major junctions: Riverway / Fenway in Fenway–Kenmore
- West end: Route 2 in Fenway–Kenmore

Other
- Designer: Frederick Law Olmsted

Park Drive is a mostly one-way, two-lane parkway in the Fenway-Kenmore neighborhood of Boston that runs along the northern and western edges of the Back Bay Fens before ending at Mountfort Street. As part of the Emerald Necklace park system mainly designed by Frederick Law Olmsted in the late 19th century, Park Drive, along with the Back Bay Fens and the Fenway, connects the Commonwealth Avenue Mall and Boylston Street to Beacon Street and the Riverway. For a portion of its length, the parkway runs along the Muddy River and is part of the Metropolitan Park System of Greater Boston's Muddy River Reservation. Like others in the park system, it is maintained by the Massachusetts Department of Conservation and Recreation.

== Route description ==
Park Drive begins near the intersection of Boylston Street and Ipswich Street and heads south with two one-way lanes to Peterborough Street. From there an additional one-way road begins with parallel parking on both sides. It runs on the north side of the flowing traffic and is separated by a grassy tree-lined median. The road continues in this fashion until it reaches the end of the Fens where the parking side merges into the main roadway along with traffic entering from the Fenway on the other side of the Muddy River. A parking lane is created on the right and the road travels with two one-way lanes towards Brookline Avenue. Two more lanes are added as it crosses Brookline Avenue and passes the Landmark Center in Audubon Circle. The two left lanes become left-turn-only and facilitate access to the Riverway and the reverse direction towards the Fenway. The right two lanes continue straight through the intersection and two lanes in the opposite direction join it. After its intersection with Beacon Street, Park Drive loses a lane in each direction and continues for two more blocks as part of Massachusetts Route 2 before ending at Mountfort Street near the Massachusetts Turnpike.

Park Drive runs alongside the Muddy River from its beginning at Boylston Street to its intersection with Brookline Avenue. The Fenway, which is located on the other side of the Back Bay Fens, allows for continuous travel in the opposite direction of Park Drive. It is accessible from where Park Drive becomes two-way at Brookline Avenue and ends on Boylston Street near where Park Drive begins.

== History ==
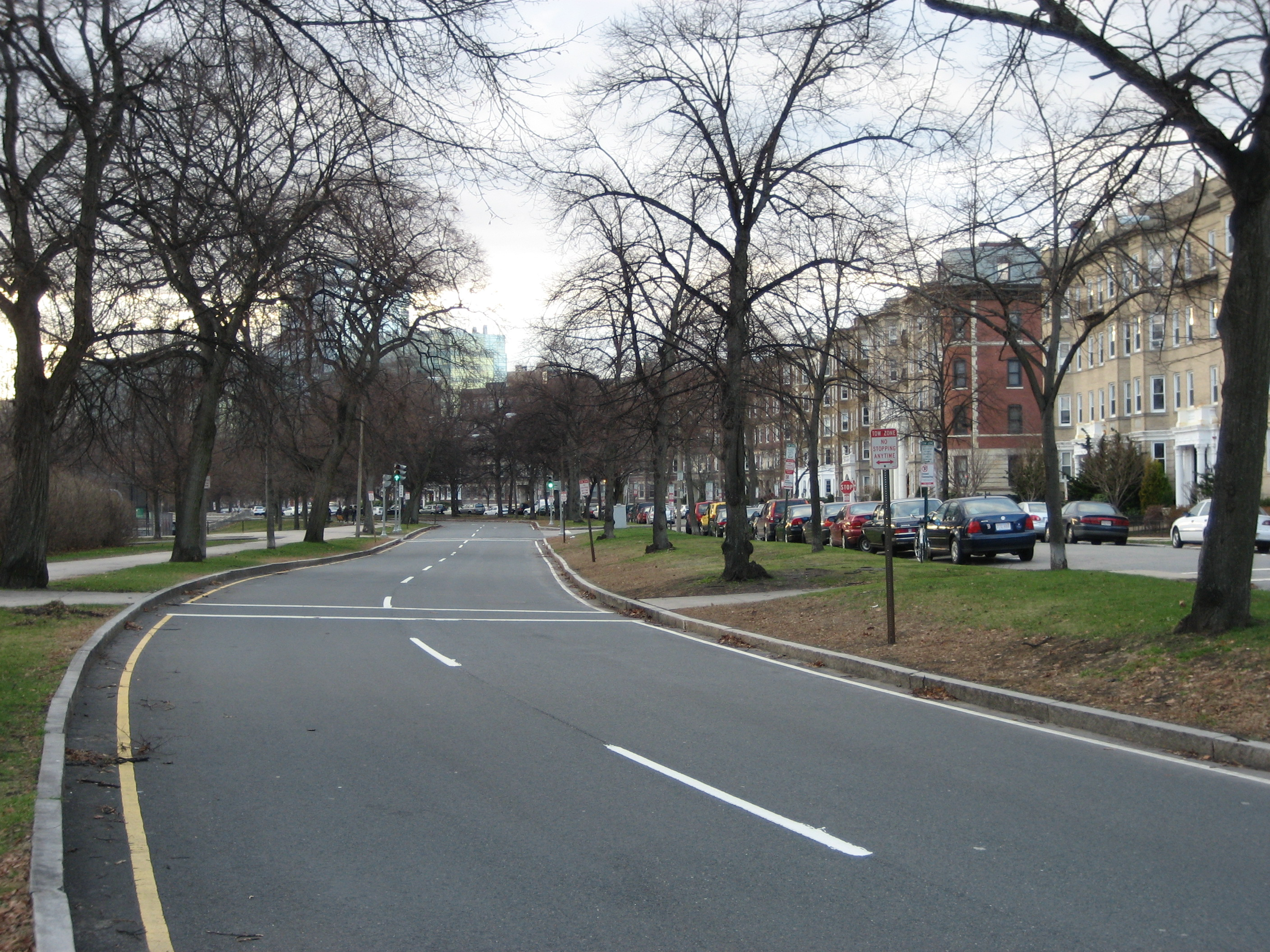
Park Drive with median separating main road (left) and service road (right).

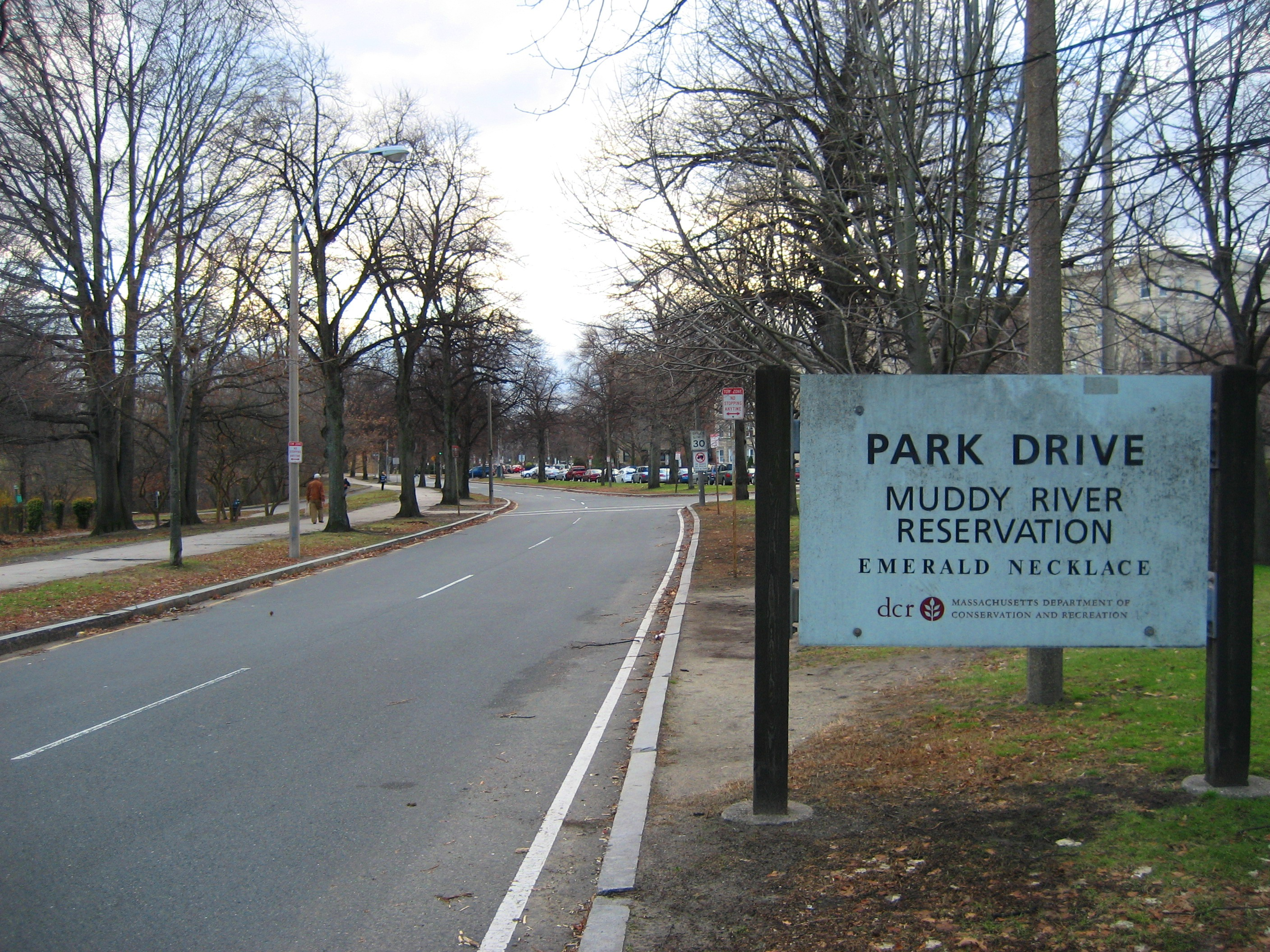
Easternmost end of Park Drive near Boylston Street.

In 1875, the voters of the City of Boston and the Massachusetts legislature approved the creation of a park commission in order to promote the creation of public parks in the city. Frederick Law Olmsted, the landscape architect of New York City's Central Park, began to spend an increasing amount of time in the area and was asked by the park commission in the mid-to-late 1870s to be the judge of a 23-entry design competition to build a new park. Olmsted felt that all of the submitted plans were subpar and either did not take into account flood control or focused too much on it and neglected the public park aspect. The Muddy River and Stony Brook flowed through the Back Bay Fens (an artificial marshland commonly referred to as the Fens) which were at the time subject to tidal flow, storm flooding, and sewage discharge. The disappointed park commission then asked Olmsted to be its professional adviser and main landscape architect. Under his direction, what is now called the Emerald Necklace took shape. He directed the Fens to be dredged, graded, planted, and turned into a seemingly natural salt marsh to absorb and clean the flowing waters. He then built a series of parks stretching from the Fens near the existing Commonwealth Avenue greenway to Franklin Park some miles away. The parks were connected to each other by scenic parkways, one of which is Park Drive around the northern and western sides of the Back Bay Fens. Originally Park Drive was named Audubon Road in conjunction with the adjoining Audubon Circle, at the intersection with Beacon Street, in honor of the Audubon Society and the vast avian population within the Olmsted designed Fens. Nearby Hemenway Street was also named after Harriet Hemenway one of the founders of the Massachusetts Audubon Society The parkway was renamed Park Drive sometime between 1928 and 1938 when alterations to the Fens resulted in a large part of the artificial marshland being filled for more formal parkland . As part of the Metropolitan Park System of Greater Boston, Park Drive is maintained by the Massachusetts Department of Conservation and Recreation (DCR), rather than the City of Boston.

The roadway from Boylston Street to Brookline Avenue opened to traffic on January 3, 1892, while surfacing of the remainder of the parkway to Mountfort Street was finished by 1895.

== Major intersections ==
The entire route is in the Fenway–Kenmore neighborhood of Boston, Suffolk County.

mi	km	Destinations	Notes
0.0	0.0	Boylston Street	One-way pair with Fenway
0.7	1.1	Brookline Avenue	
0.8	1.3	Riverway south / Fenway east	Termini of Riverway and Fenway; end of one-way segment
1.0	1.6	Route 2 east (Beacon Street)	Route 2 continues east
1.1	1.8	Route 2 west (Mountfort Street)	Route 2 continues west
1.000 mi = 1.609 km; 1.000 km = 0.621 mi: Incomplete access; Route transition
