= Brookline Avenue =

Street in Greater Boston, Massachusetts

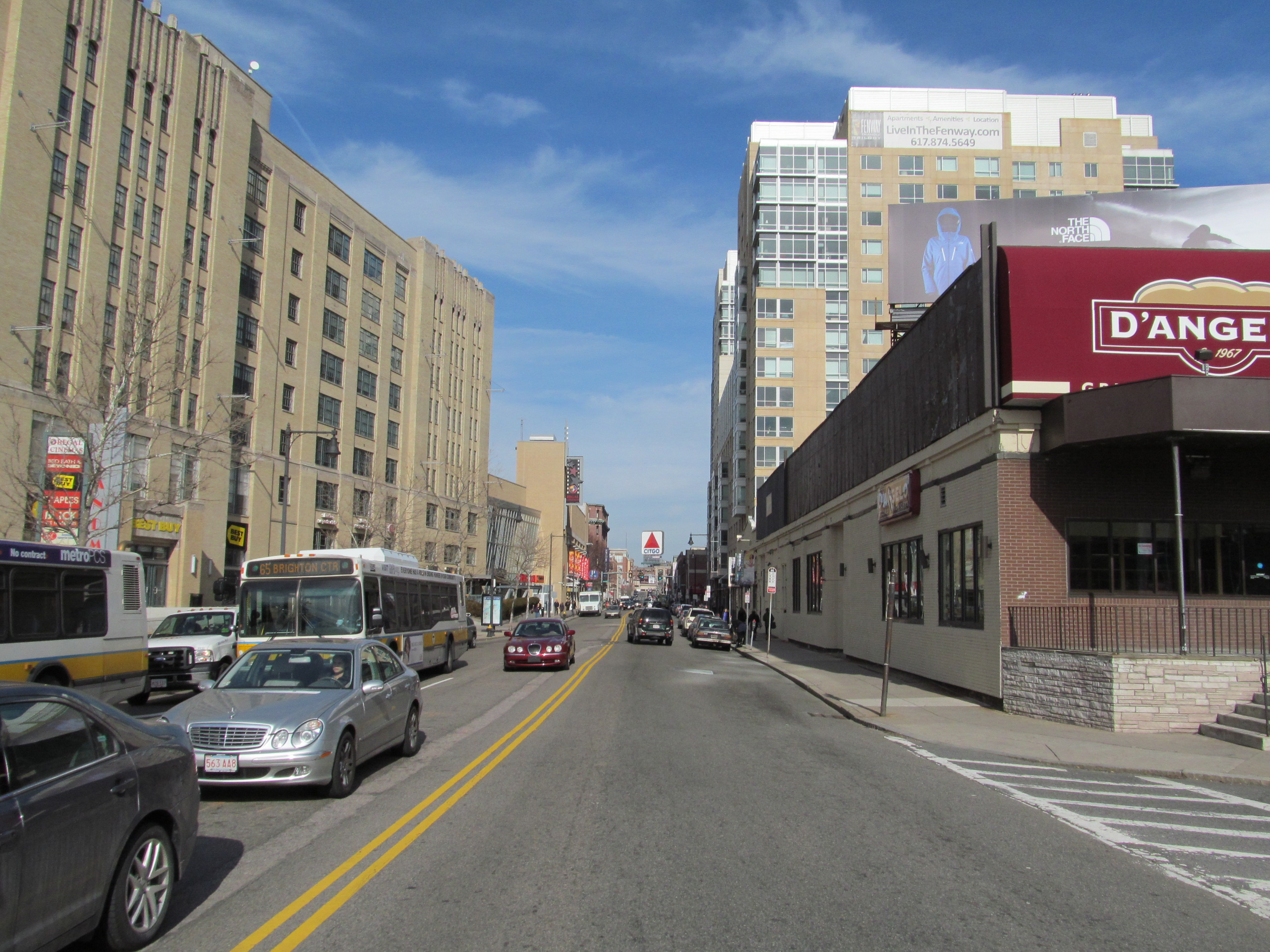
- Brookline Avenue looking northeast from its intersection with Boylston Street and Park Drive (2012)
- Interactive map of Brookline Avenue
- Location: Boston, Massachusetts, U.S.
- South end: Brookline, Massachusetts, U.S.
- Major junctions: Route 9 in Brookline; Boylston Street / Park Drive in Boston
- North end: US 20 in Boston

Brookline Avenue is a principal urban artery in the city of Boston, Massachusetts. It runs from Kenmore Square in the Fenway-Kenmore neighborhood, forming a 1.5-mile (2.4 km) straight line to its other terminus at Washington Street in the Brookline Village neighborhood of Brookline, Massachusetts. The Landmark Center, Fenway Park, Emmanuel College, Longwood Medical and Academic Area and Kenmore Square are sites along its length.

A few yards after its origin at Commonwealth Avenue, Brookline Avenue crosses both the Massachusetts Turnpike and the MBTA's Framingham/Worcester Line just east of Lansdowne station and beside Fenway Park. In 2016, it was named for former Boston Red Sox player David Ortiz upon his retirement from the game. Continuing southwest, the road intersects Boylston Street, Park Drive, the Fenway, and the Riverway, crossing the Emerald Necklace twice; the street ends at Brookline Avenue's westernmost crossing of the Necklace.

The road was laid out between 1818 and 1821 during the construction of the Boston & Roxbury Mill Dam across Boston's Back Bay. It led from the western end of the dam at Sewall's Point (now Kenmore Square) to the Punch Bowl Tavern on Washington Street in Brookline. The road was known by various names, including the Punch Bowl Road, the Mill Dam Road, and Western Avenue. (Mill Dam Road and Western Avenue were also used for the road that crossed the dam (now Beacon Street) and for its extension west to Brighton. "Brookline Branch" was sometimes used to distinguish this road from the others.) The name Brookline Avenue was officially adopted in 1868.
