= Muddy River (Massachusetts) =

River in Brookline and Boston, Massachusetts

Coordinates: 42.342114°N 71.108236°W

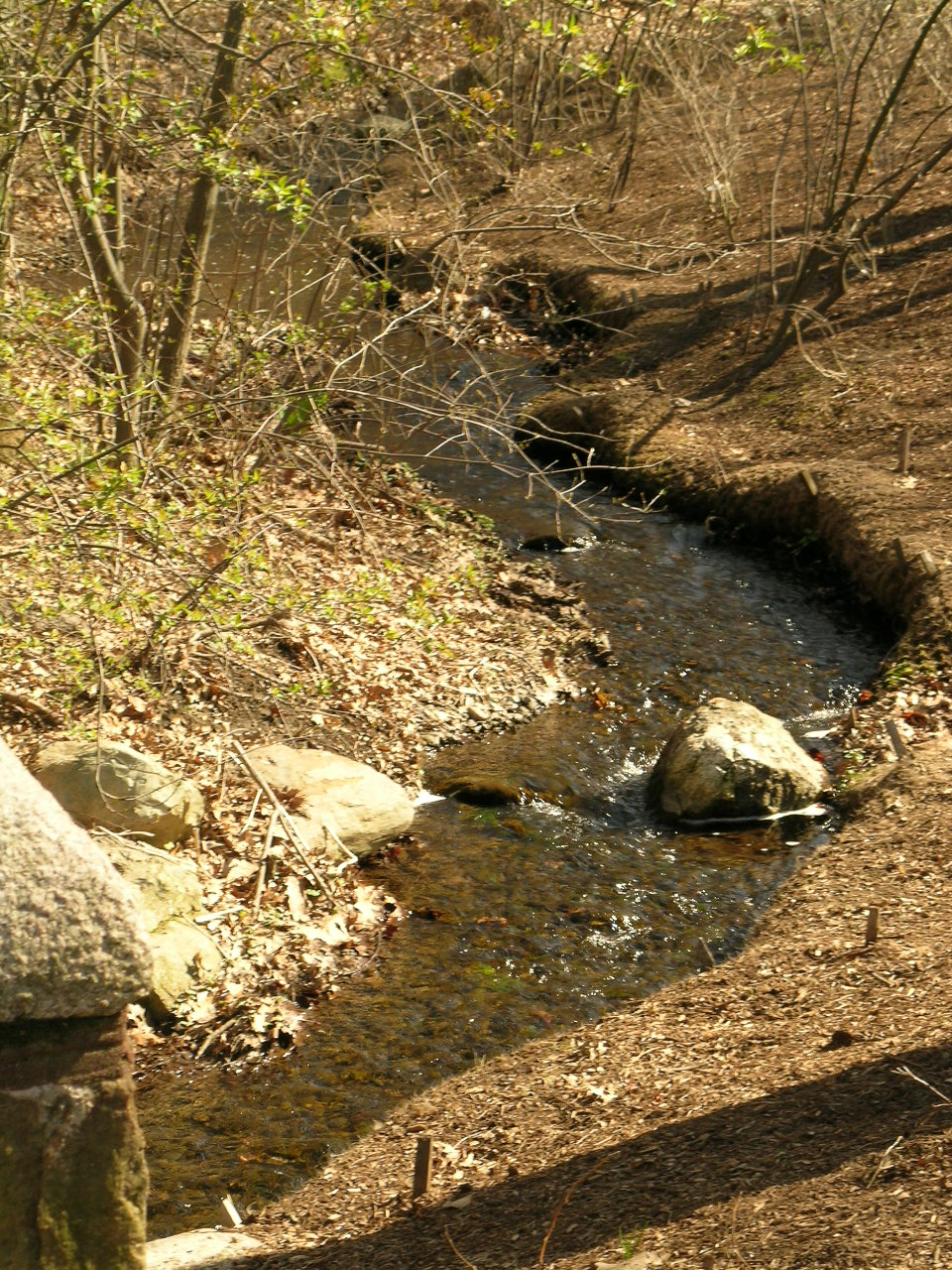

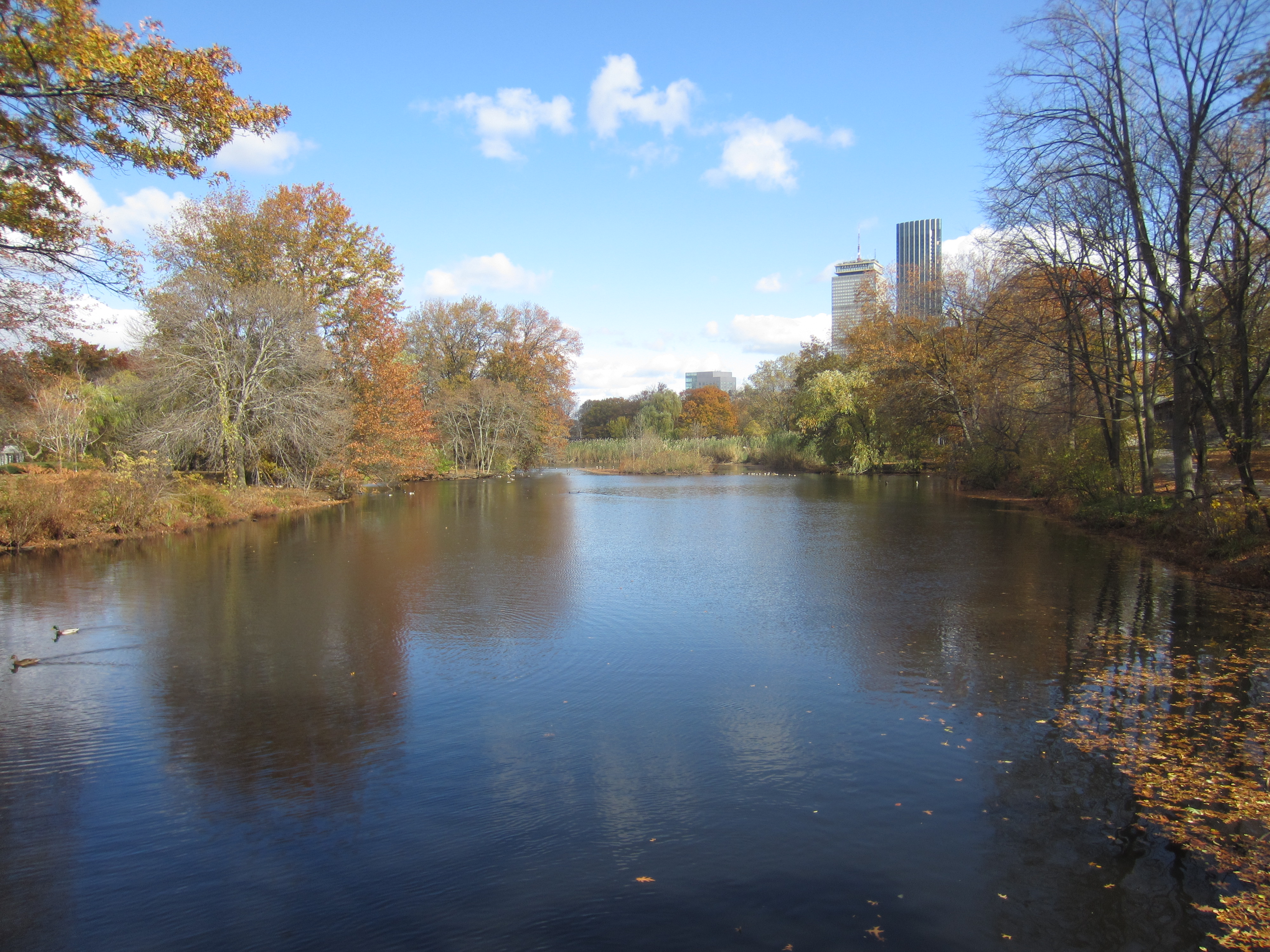
The Muddy River in the Back Bay Fens

The Muddy River is a series of brooks and ponds that runs through sections of Boston's Emerald Necklace, including along the south boundary of Brookline, Massachusetts (a town that went by the name of Muddy River Hamlet before it was incorporated in 1705). The river is a protected public recreation area surrounded by parks and hiking trails, managed by the Massachusetts Department of Conservation and Recreation.

== Course ==
The river flows from Jamaica Pond in the Jamaica Plain neighborhood of Boston through Olmsted Park's Ward's Pond, Willow Pond, and Leverett Pond. It then flows through a conduit under Route 9 and into a narrow park called the Riverway. It flows through culverts under Riverway, Brookline Avenue, and Avenue Louis Pasteur. The Muddy River continues from the Fens toward its connection with the Charles River via the Charlesgate area, running through a stone-paved channel surrounded by a narrow strip of parklands. In a series of stone bridges and tunnels, it passes under Boylston Street, Massachusetts Turnpike, Commonwealth Avenue, Storrow Drive, and a series of elevated connecting ramps (the Bowker Overpass).

== History ==
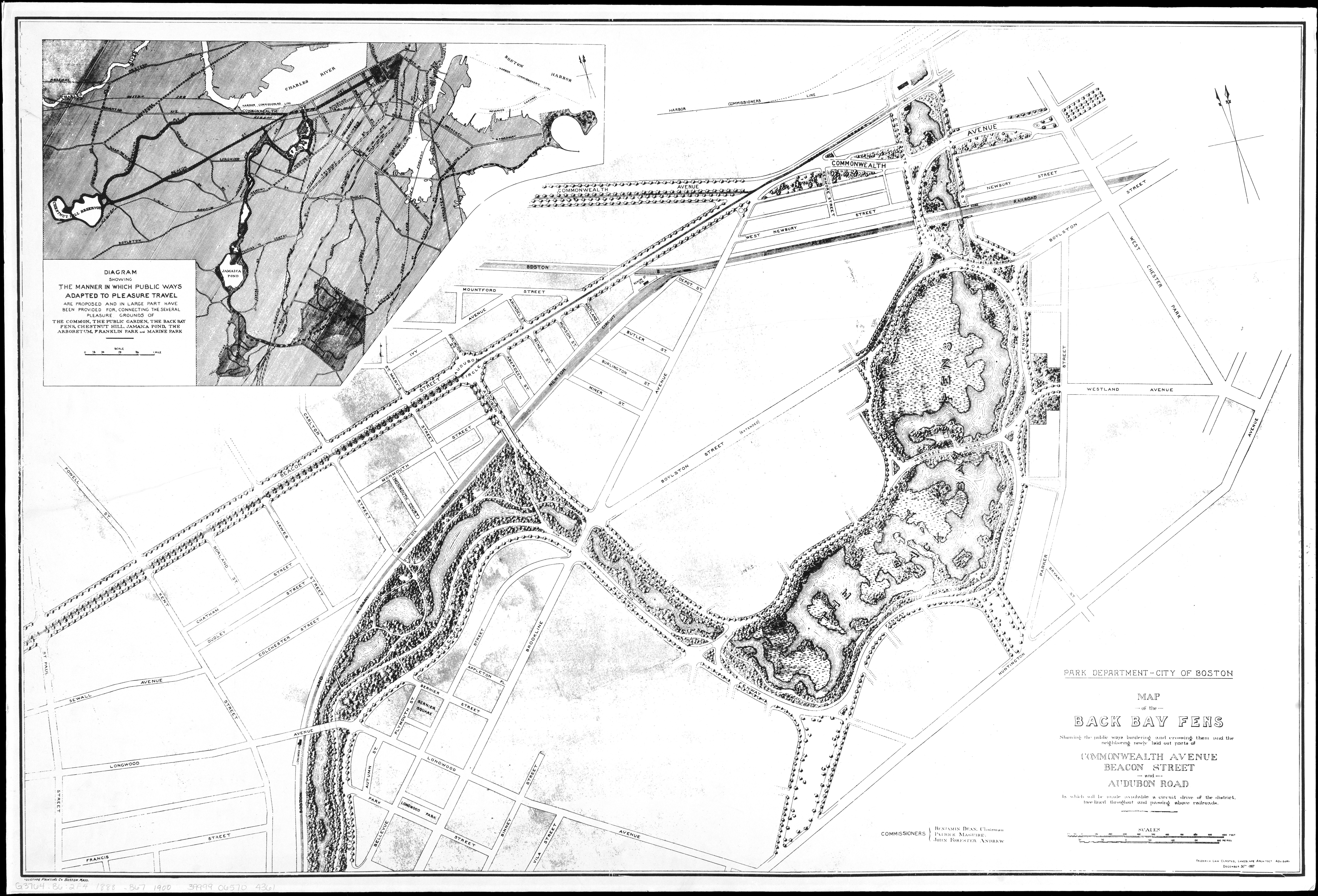
Olmsted's 1887 plan for the Back Bay Fens

In its natural state, the outlet of the Muddy River into the tidal Charles was much wider. It formed the eastern Brookline border with Boston and Roxbury (depending on the year), from Brookline's incorporation in 1705 until Boston's annexation of Allston–Brighton in 1873.

The Muddy River is mentioned by John Winthrop in his diary as the site of an unidentified flying object in March 1638 or 1639, as described to him by witness James Everell.

The present form of the river and its surrounding parks was created by the Emerald Necklace project, between 1880 and 1900. Under the direction of designer Frederick Law Olmsted, the project reclaimed marshland, creating sculpted and planted riverbanks.

In 1996, the Muddy River flooded the MBTA's Kenmore station and the surrounding area.

== Restoration (2014–2023) ==
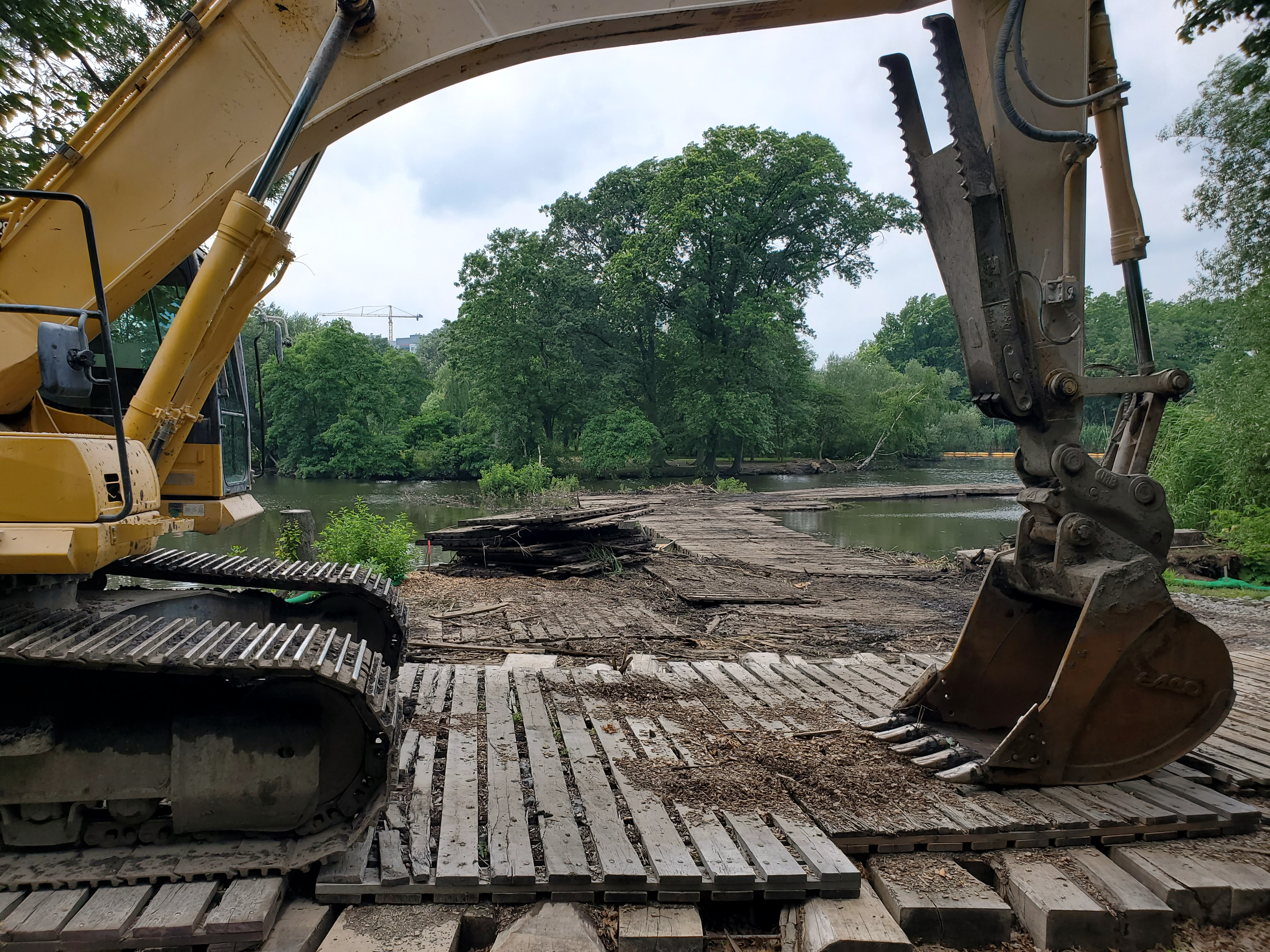
Restoration work in 2021

Beginning in 2014, the Army Corps of Engineers worked with state and local government and the citizen-led Maintenance and Management Oversight Committee (MMOC) to mitigate flooding and restore natural habitat and historic parkland.

Phase 1 was completed in 2016 with daylighting of a section of river adjacent to the Landmark Center. In a second phase from 2020 to 2023, dredging, eradication of invasive species, and replanting of native species took place from Leverett Pond to the Back Bay Fens.
