= Emerald Necklace =

Chain of parks in Massachusetts, US

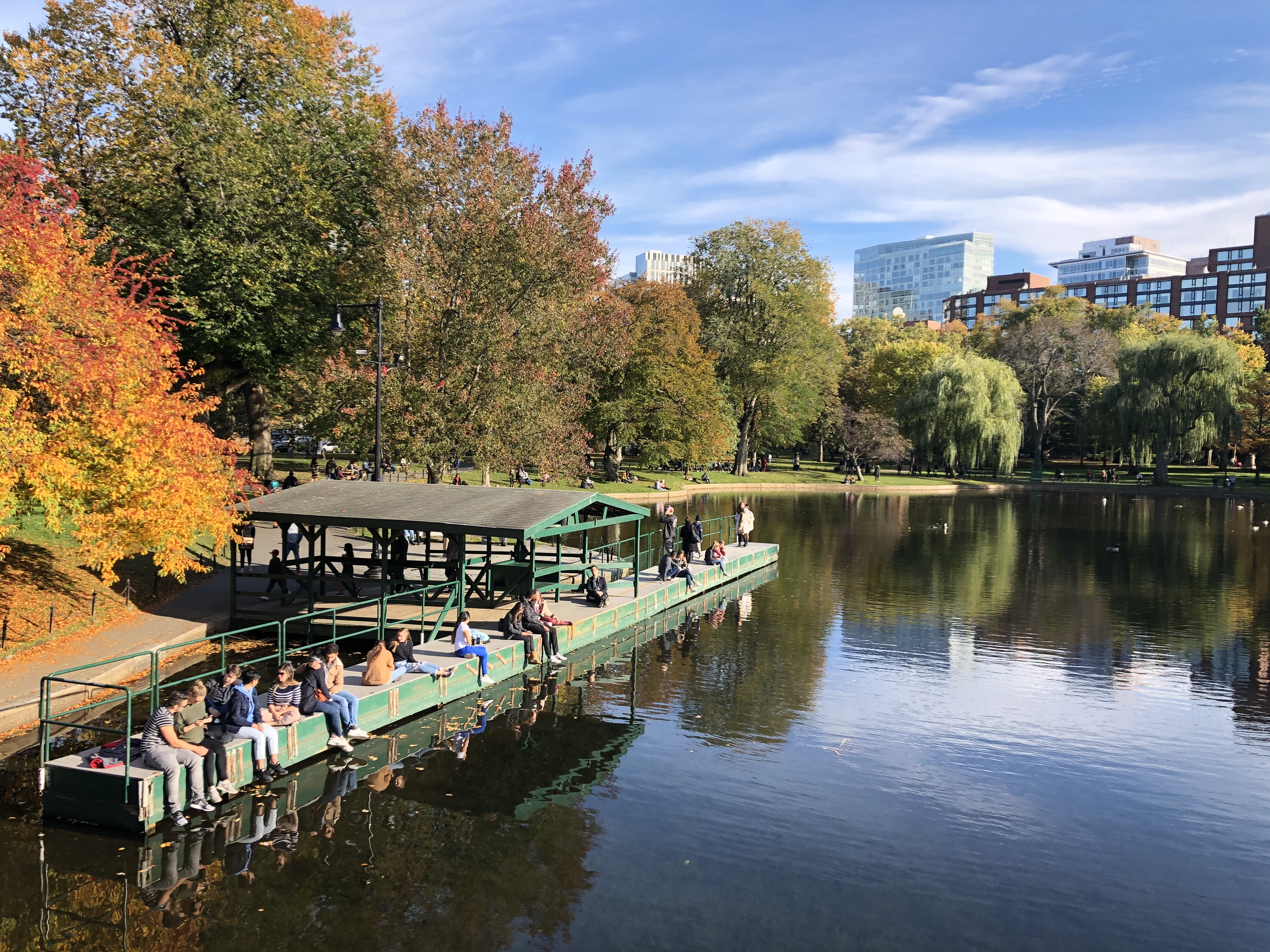
- Boston Public Garden, the second "jewel" of the Emerald Necklace

- Type: Park system
- Location: Boston and Brookline, Massachusetts, United States
- Created: 1860s
- Designer: Frederick Law Olmsted
- Operator: Emerald Necklace Conservancy
- Open: All year
- Olmsted Park System
- U.S. National Register of Historic Places
- U.S. Historic district
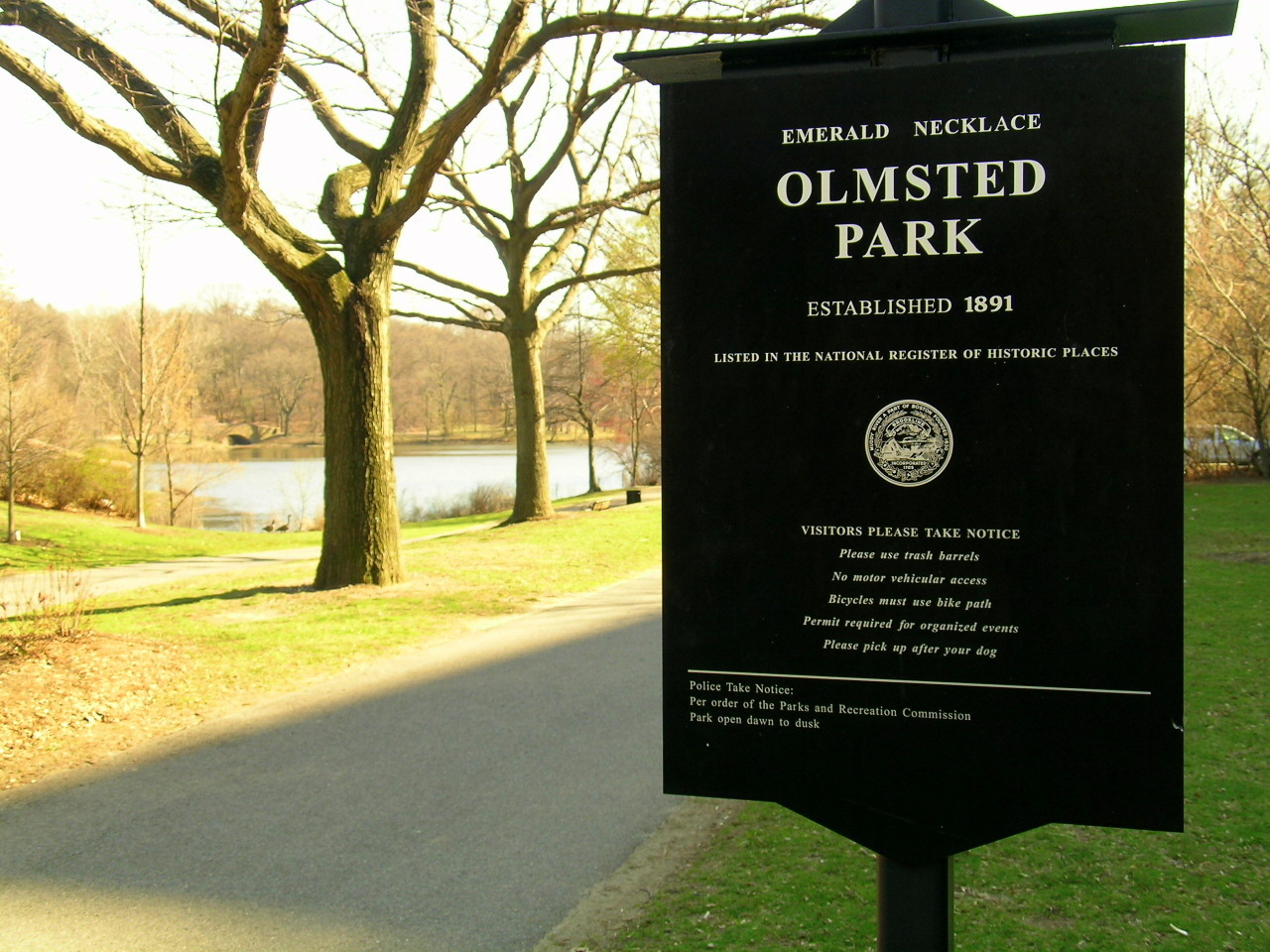
- Built: 1870
- NRHP reference No.: 71000086
- Added to NRHP: December 8, 1971

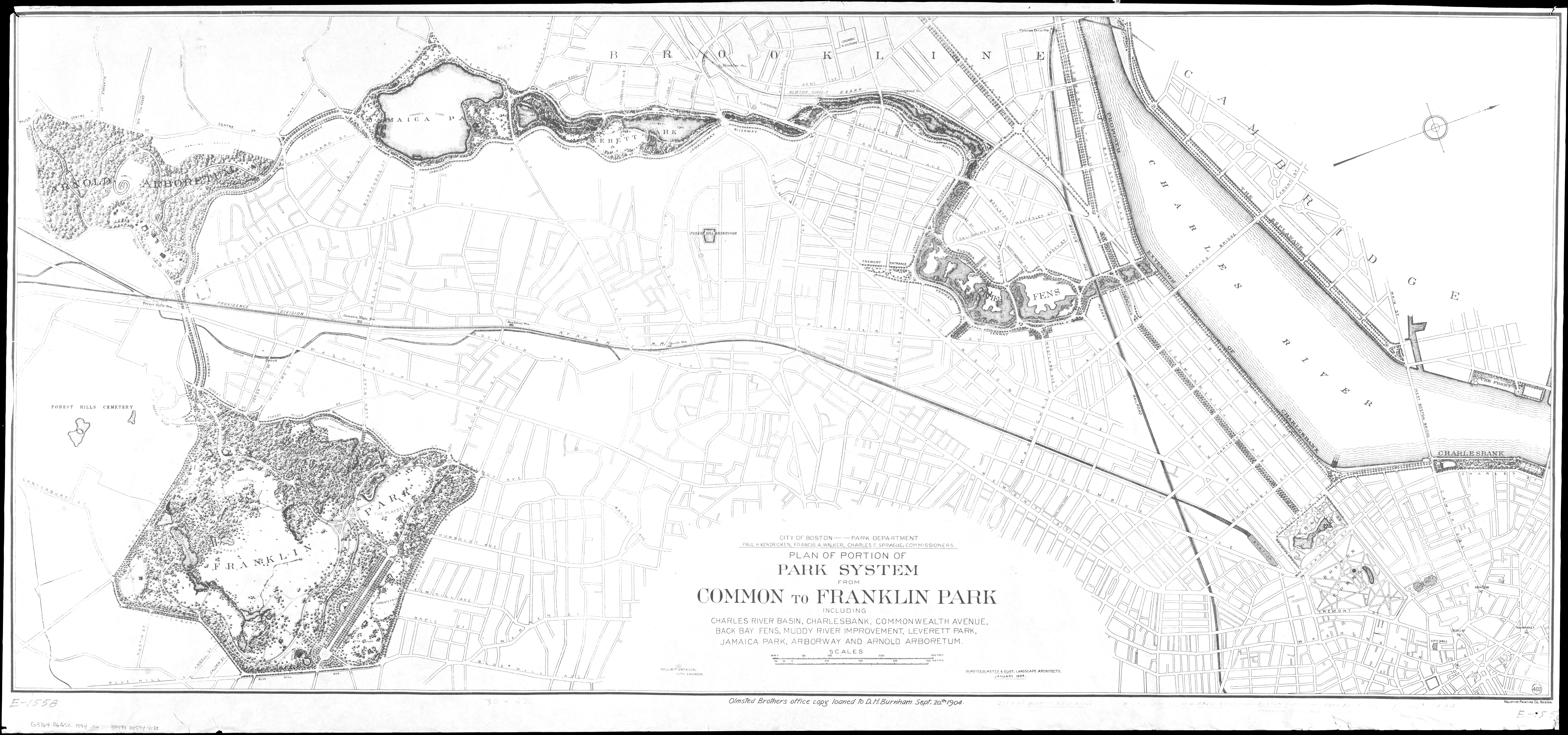
Original plan of the necklace from 1894

The Emerald Necklace consists of a 1,100-acre (4.5 km^{2}; 450 ha) chain of parks linked by parkways and waterways in Boston and Brookline, Massachusetts. It was designed by landscape architect Frederick Law Olmsted, and gets its name from the way the planned chain appears to hang from the "neck" of the Boston peninsula. In 1989, the Emerald Necklace was designated as a Boston Landmark by the Boston Landmarks Commission.

== Overview ==
The Necklace comprises half of the City of Boston's park acreage, parkland in the Town of Brookline, and parkways and park edges under the jurisdiction of the Commonwealth of Massachusetts. More than 300,000 people live within its watershed area. From Boston Common to Franklin Park it is approximately seven miles by foot or bicycle through the parks.

The Emerald Necklace includes:

- Boston Common
- Public Garden
- Commonwealth Avenue Mall
- The Fens
- Forsyth Park
- The Riverway
- Olmsted Park
- Jamaica Pond
- Jamaicaway
- Arborway
- Arnold Arboretum
- Franklin Park

Several components of the Emerald Necklace pre-date the plan to unite them. Some links of the Emerald Necklace not only offer an opportunity for recreation in a wooded environment, but are also ecologically important urban wilds that provide nesting places for migratory birds and improve the air quality of the city.

== History ==
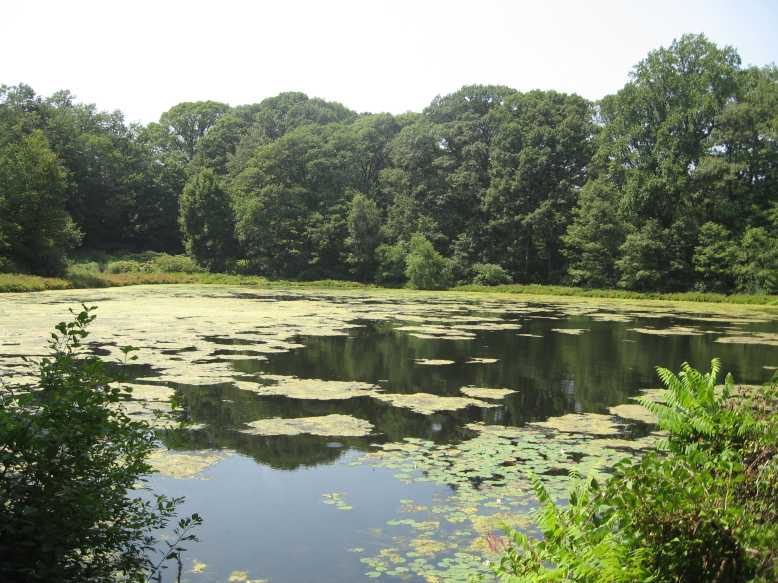
Ward's Pond in Olmsted Park

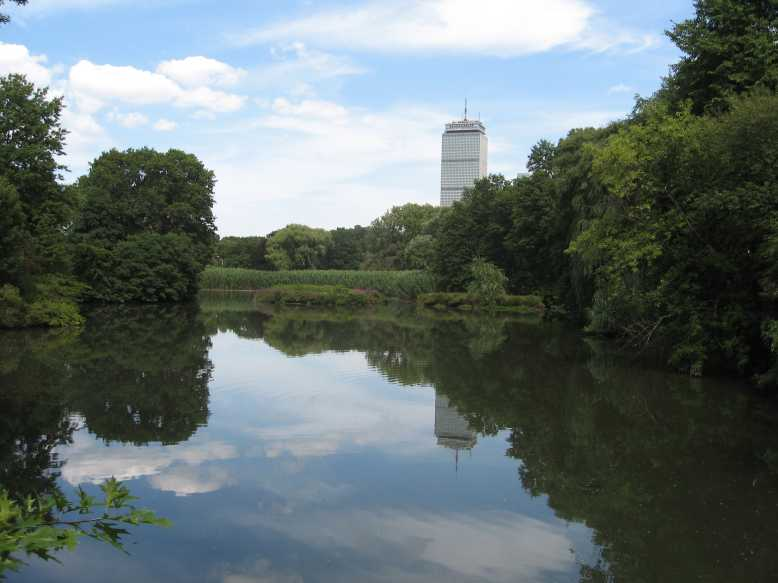
Fens from footbridge opposite Forsyth Dental building, looking north. Prudential building in background

This linear system of parks was designed by Frederick Law Olmsted to connect Boston Common, dating from the colonial period, and Public Garden (1837) to Franklin Park, known as the "great country park."

The project began around 1878 with the effort to clean up and control the marshy area which became the Back Bay and The Fens. In 1880, Olmsted proposed that the Muddy River, which flowed from Jamaica Pond through the Fens, be included in the park plan. The current was dredged into a winding stream and directed into the Charles River. The corridor encompassing the river became the linear park still in existence today. Olmsted's vision of a linear park of walking paths along a gentle stream connecting numerous small ponds was complete by the turn of the century. The parks conceived by Olmsted, from Storrow Drive south to Franklin Park, were collectively listed on the National Register of Historic Places as the Olmsted Park System.

Over the past decade, almost $60 million in capital expenditures for parks and waterway improvements have been made in the Emerald Necklace by the City of Boston and the Town of Brookline. These efforts have included improved pathways, plantings and signage, bridge repairs, and the restoration of boardwalks and buildings. In some areas (especially the woodlands of Franklin Park and Olmsted Park) these efforts have only begun to address the over 50 years of neglect the Emerald Necklace has suffered.

Several dedicated parks organizations, including the Emerald Necklace Conservancy, the Friends of the Public Garden, the Franklin Park Coalition, and the Arboretum Park Conservancy, were created to protect, maintain, restore and advocate for the Emerald Necklace parks through the work of their staff, the donations of their constituents and the efforts of their volunteers.

== Shape ==
The Emerald Necklace begins near Boston's Downtown Crossing, proceeds along the Boston–Brookline border, then curves into Jamaica Plain. At the south border of Arnold Arboretum, at the point most distant from its beginning, the Emerald Necklace is in Roslindale. It then hooks back up into Roxbury and Dorchester.

Olmsted's original plan called for a U-shaped necklace which terminated at Boston Harbor. The final link, the Dorchesterway, was never realized.

== Jurisdiction ==
- Arnold Arboretum is leased to and managed by Harvard University.
- The west banks of Olmsted Park and the Riverway are under the jurisdiction of Brookline Parks & Open Space.
- The majority of the Emerald Necklace is maintained by Boston Parks and Recreation with a small portion belonging to the Department of Conservation and Recreation.

=== Emerald Necklace Conservancy ===
The Emerald Necklace Conservancy is a private non-profit stewardship organization founded in 1998. Its mission is to restore and improve the Emerald Necklace for all. To steward the Emerald Necklace’s 1,100 acres of parkland extending from Boston’s Back Bay through Brookline and Jamaica Plain to Franklin Park in Dorchester, the conservancy works in collaboration with its partners on advocacy, maintenance and restoration, education and access, and promoting park stewardship through volunteer and youth programs.

Governed by a board of directors, the conservancy brings together representatives of both the private and public sectors to carry out these goals. Its activities complement the longstanding initiatives of its public partners, the Boston Parks & Recreation Department, Brookline Parks and Open Space and the Massachusetts Department of Conservation and Recreation.

The Conservancy offers a wide range of services to visitors of the Emerald Necklace including events, guided tours, a mobile tour guide, volunteer opportunities and youth programs.

== Plans ==
The Emerald Necklace Parks Master Plan was completed in 1989, and updated in 2001.

The parks have long been subject to flooding from the Muddy River. The Muddy River Restoration Project will dredge contaminated sediments and implement other major structural improvements, unburying the river and improving its integrity, appearance, and flood control capabilities. Phase I – daylighting the river at the Landmark Center – began spring 2009.

The parks have similarly been attempting to mitigate the spread of Phragmites (an invasive species of grass). Olmsted's initial view of a park with linear composition is being compromised due to the common reed. It has taken a lot of conservation efforts in order to limit this plant's spread, making it more difficult to achieve Olmsted's vision.

== See also ==
- Charles River Esplanade
- Columbia Road
- Forest Hills Cemetery
- Larz Anderson Park
- Massachusetts Audubon Society
- National Register of Historic Places listings in:
  - northern Boston
  - southern Boston
  - Brookline, Massachusetts
- Southwest Corridor Park
- Rose Kennedy Greenway
