= 360 Newbury Street =

Commercial and residential building in Boston

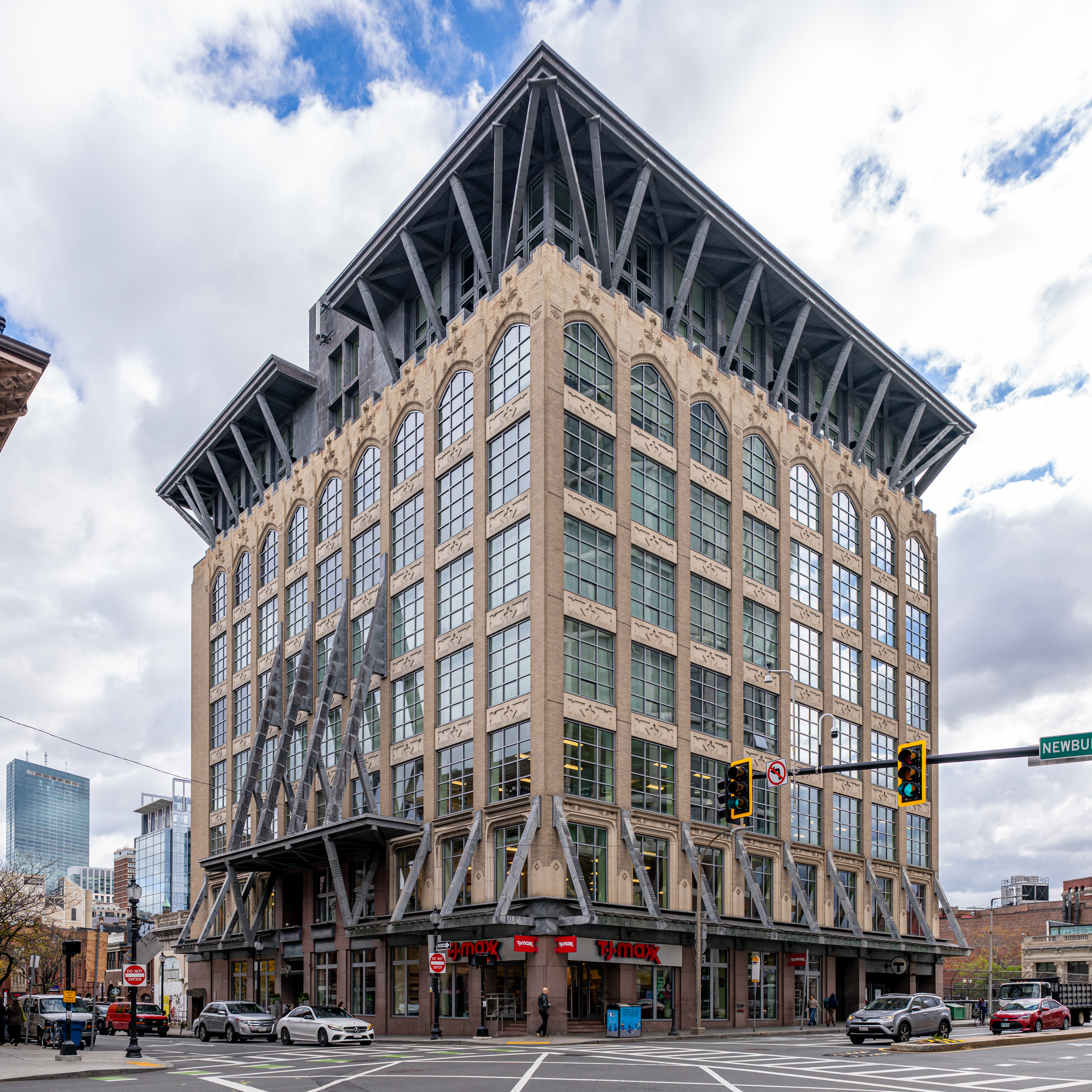
- 360 Newbury Street in November 2025
- Interactive map of the 360 Newbury Street area
- Alternative names: Transit Building, Tower Records Building

General information
- Location: 360 Newbury Street at Massachusetts Avenue; Boston, Massachusetts
- Coordinates: 42°20′52.6″N 71°05′15.7″W
- Completed: October 1919
- Renovated: 1991, 2005

Technical details
- Floor count: 9

Design and construction
- Architect: Arthur Bowditch

Renovating team
- Architect: Frank Gehry

Other information
- Public transit: Green Line at Hynes Convention Center; MBTA bus: 1, 55

360 Newbury Street (also known as the Transit Building and the Tower Records building) is a nine-story commercial and residential building located at the intersection of Newbury Street and Massachusetts Avenue in the Back Bay neighborhood of Boston, Massachusetts. Designed by Arthur Bowditch, it was constructed in 1919 and first served as the headquarters of the Boston Elevated Railway. The eight-story building was later used as a warehouse and office space, and housed Tower Records from 1987 to 2001. An additional story was added in the late 1980s during a Frank Gehry-designed renovation; another was created from a mezzanine during a 2005 renovation. The lower three floors house retail space and an entrance to Hynes Convention Center station; the upper six floors contain private condominiums.

== History ==
The west part of the Back Bay was filled in the 1870s. By the early 1880s, the southeast corner of Westchester Park (later Massachusetts Avenue) and Newbury Street was occupied by building contractor George Wheatland Jr., with the 1834-opened Boston and Albany Railroad bordering it to the south. The building was later used by the Boston Cab Company (later the Charles S. Brown Company), a horse-drawn cab company.

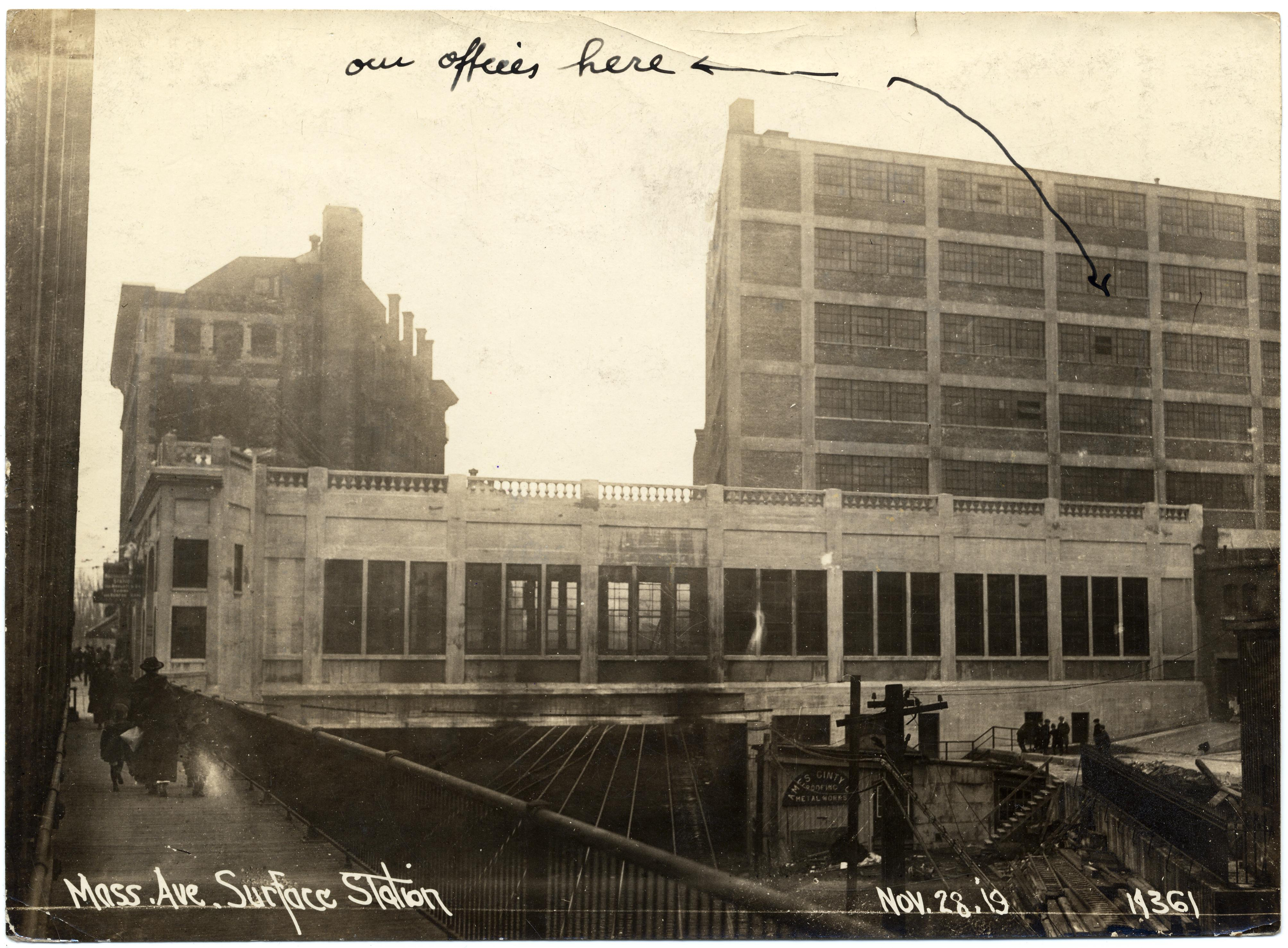
The building (right) in 1919

In July 1911, the 132nd Massachusetts General Court enacted legislation providing for the construction of several tunnels, including the Boylston Street subway. Construction began in March 1912. The Boston Transit Commission (BTC) negotiated an easement through the Boston Cab Company building on September 24, 1912. The building was later determined to be unsafe; the BTC acquired it on April 3, 1913, and demolished it soon after, allowing construction on the west part of Massachusetts station (now Hynes Convention Center station) to proceed. The main headhouse of the station was built on the former cab company site. Wooden and concrete piles were driven through 7 feet (2.1 m) of silt to provide a firm foundation for the station, and to allow for future air rights development atop it. The station and tunnel opened on October 3, 1914.

Construction on a seven-story office building (originally planned as eight stories) atop the station lobby by the Newbury Realty Company began in 1917. Designed by Arthur Bowditch, the building was completed in October 1919. In January 1920, the BERy moved its offices into the building, as its lease at 101 Milk Street was expiring. The BERy used the upper floors of the building, then known as the Transit Building, as its offices until 1926.

By 1938, the building was owned by an insurance firm, but still known as the Transit Building. It was later used for warehousing and offices, with restaurants and retail (including an E.U. Wurlitzer Music and Sound store) on the ground floor. The construction of the Massachusetts Turnpike in the 1960s removed neighboring buildings to the south along Massachusetts Avenue and Boylston Street. In February 1986, Sacramento-based Tower Records announced plans to open a store on the first three floors of the building. The outlet – billed as the largest record store in the country – opened on December 14, 1987.

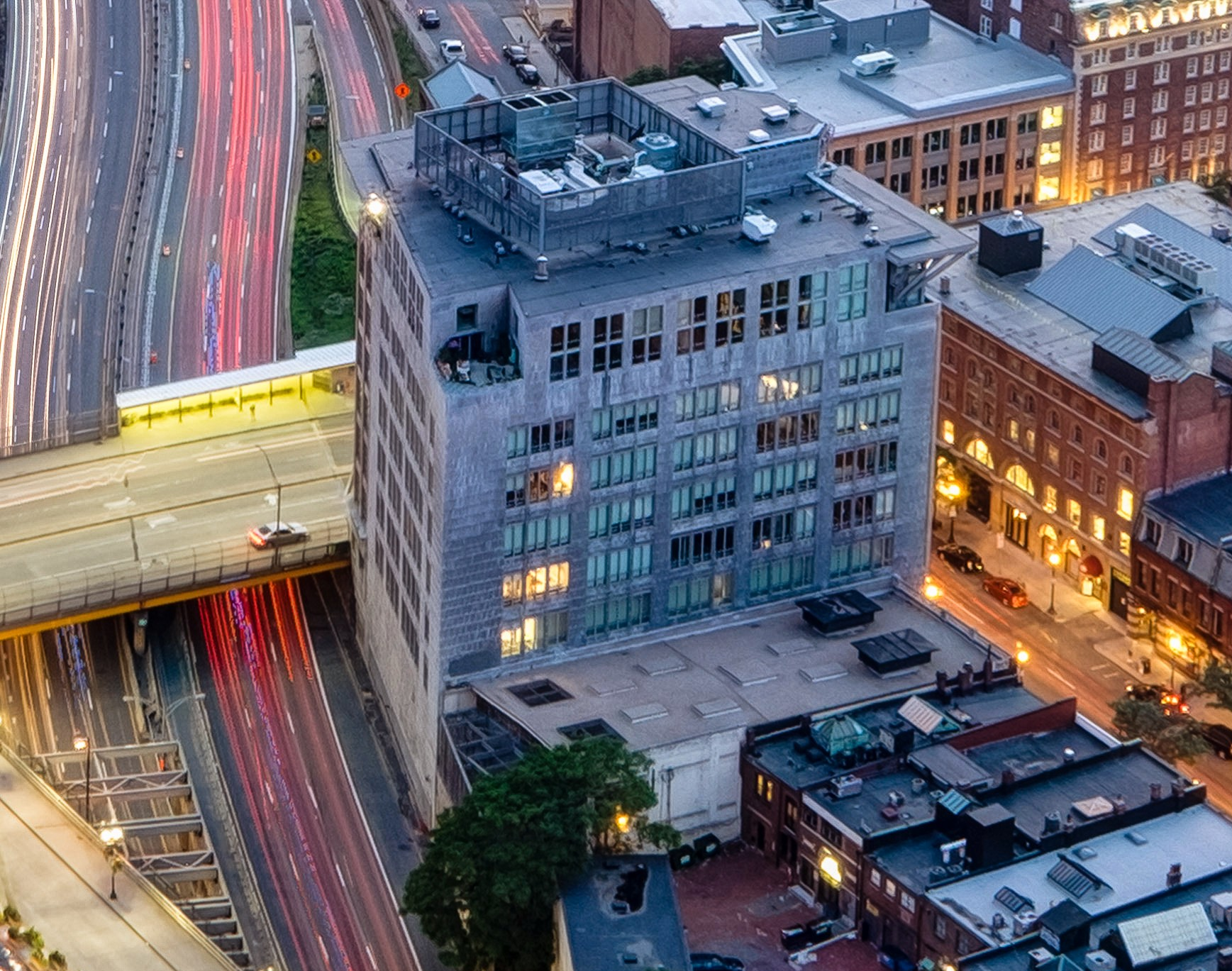
The building viewed from above

In mid-1986, developer Richard Cohen began a major renovation of the building, which was designed by architect Frank Gehry. A 20-foot (6.1 m)-high eighth floor was added, with a cornice support by angled struts. The south and east sides of the building were sheathed in lead-coated copper; the street-facing west and north sides retained their original brick and stone, but added glass canopies supported by more angled struts. A Boston Globe architecture critic praised the renovation for its boldness in architecturally-conservative Boston. In 1991, the renovation was chosen as one of the 19 best works of the year by the American Institute of Architects – the top national prize in architecture. The structure was popularly known as the "Tower Records building".

The 130,000 square feet (12,000 m^{2}) building was sold for $47 million in 2004. The top five floors were converted into six floors, with 54 condominiums. In March 2007, the lower three floors were expected to sell for $45–55 million. Boston Residential Group sold the floors to Spanish holding company Ponte Gadea later that year.

The Tower Records store closed in 2001. The retail space was occupied by Virgin Megastore from 2002 to 2006, then Best Buy until 2012. A TJ Maxx store opened in the space in May 2016.
