= Massachusetts Avenue station =

Rapid transit station in Boston, Massachusetts, US

Massachusetts Ave
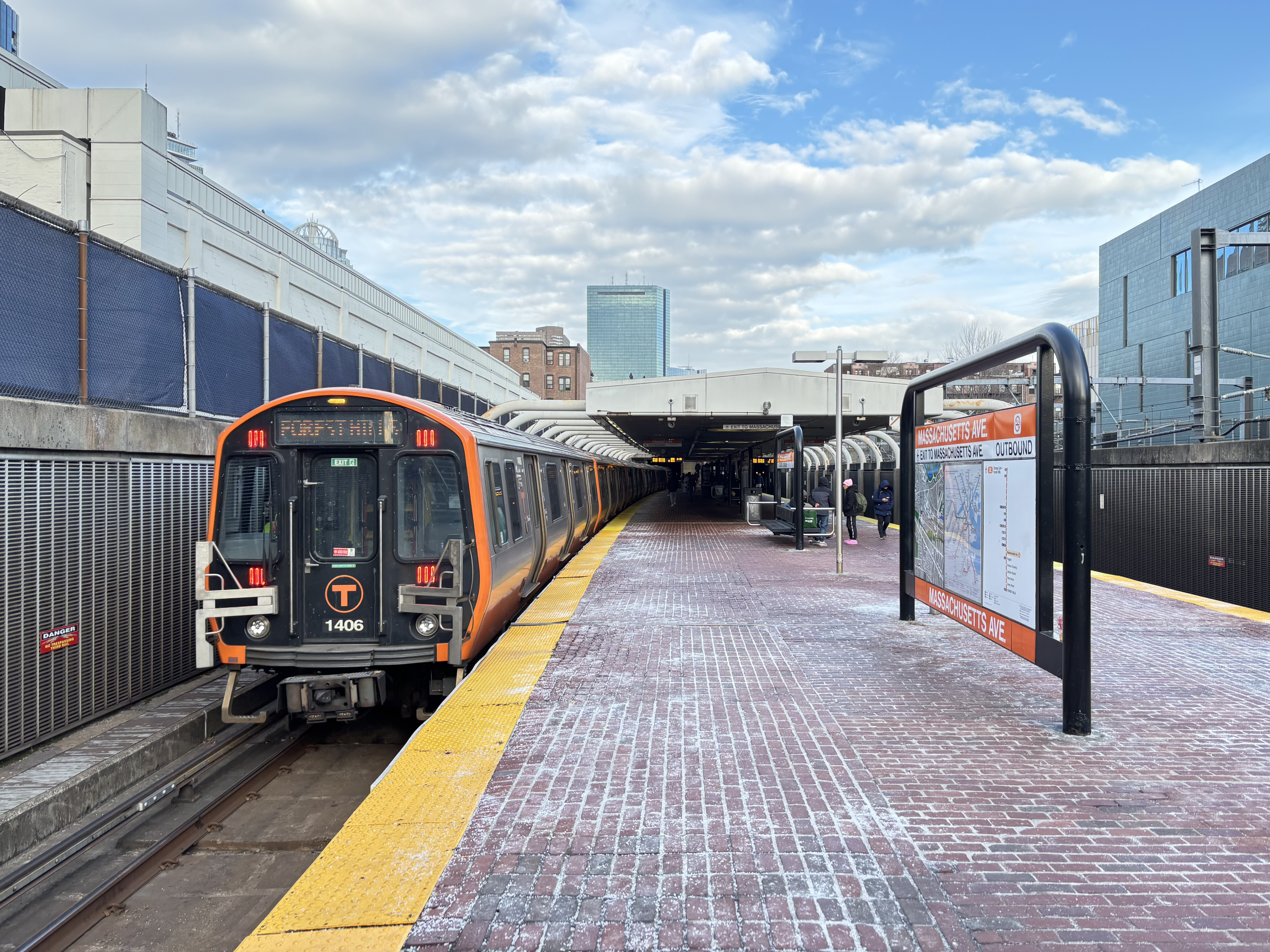
- A southbound train arriving at the station in December 2025

General information
- Location: 380 Massachusetts Avenue; Boston, Massachusetts
- Coordinates: 42.34098°N 71.08409°W
- Line: Southwest Corridor
- Platforms: 1 island platform
- Tracks: 2
- Connections: MBTA bus: 1

Construction
- Structure type: Below grade
- Accessible: Yes

History
- Opened: May 4, 1987

Passengers
- FY2019: 5,627 daily boardings

Services
| Preceding station | MBTA | Following station |
|---|---|---|
| Ruggles toward Forest Hills | Orange Line | Back Bay toward Oak Grove |
Track layout
Location

Massachusetts Avenue station is a rapid transit station in the South End and Symphony neighborhoods of Boston, Massachusetts. It serves the MBTA Orange Line, and is located at 380 Massachusetts Avenue. The station opened in 1987 as part of the renovation and relocation of the southern Orange Line into the Southwest Corridor.

== Station layout ==
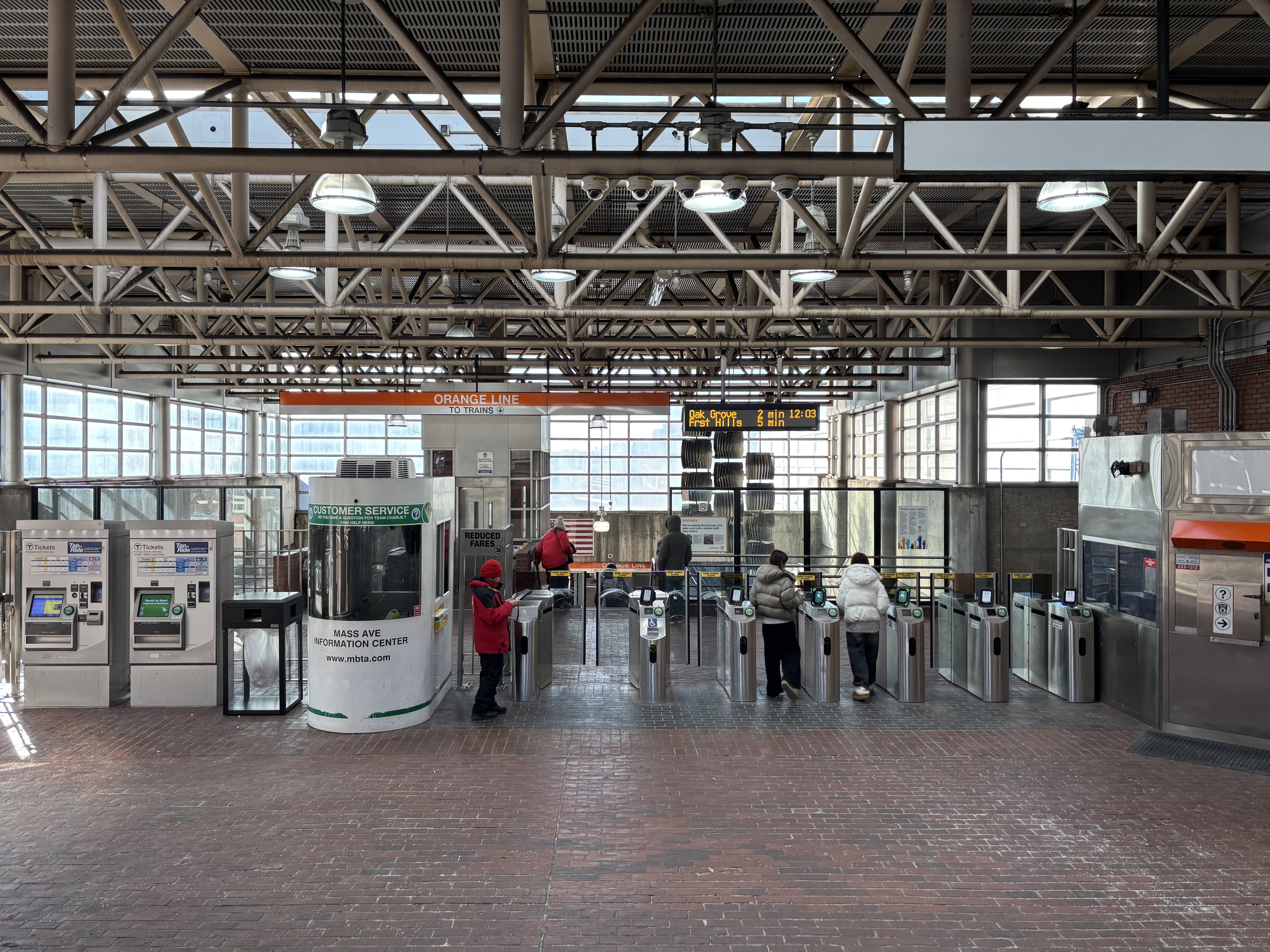
Interior of the main headhouse

Like all stations on the Orange Line, Massachusetts Avenue is accessible. The station has a single island platform serving the two tracks of the Orange Line. The main headhouse is located on the south side of Massachusetts Avenue; a pedestrian tunnel leads to a secondary entrance on the north side. An exit-only staircase at the south end of the platform leads to a footbridge connecting Gainsborough Street and Camden Street.

The MBTA plans to add a fare lobby and elevator at the footbridge, and to replace the existing elevator at the main entrance. A $4.7 million design contract for Jackson Square and Massachusetts Avenue was awarded in April 2020. Design work reached 30% completion in 2021 and 75% completion in 2022; it was nearing completion by November 2023.

== History ==
=== Chickering station ===
The Boston and Providence Railroad (B&P) opened southwest from Boston in June 1834. There were initially no intermediate stations between the Boston terminal (near Park Square) and Roxbury, as the line passed through the unoccupied Charles River mud flats. Filling of the flats began in the late 1850s, forming the Back Bay and South End neighborhoods. The flats between Tremont Street and the railroad causeway were filled and developed during the 1860s, becoming the west portion of the South End.

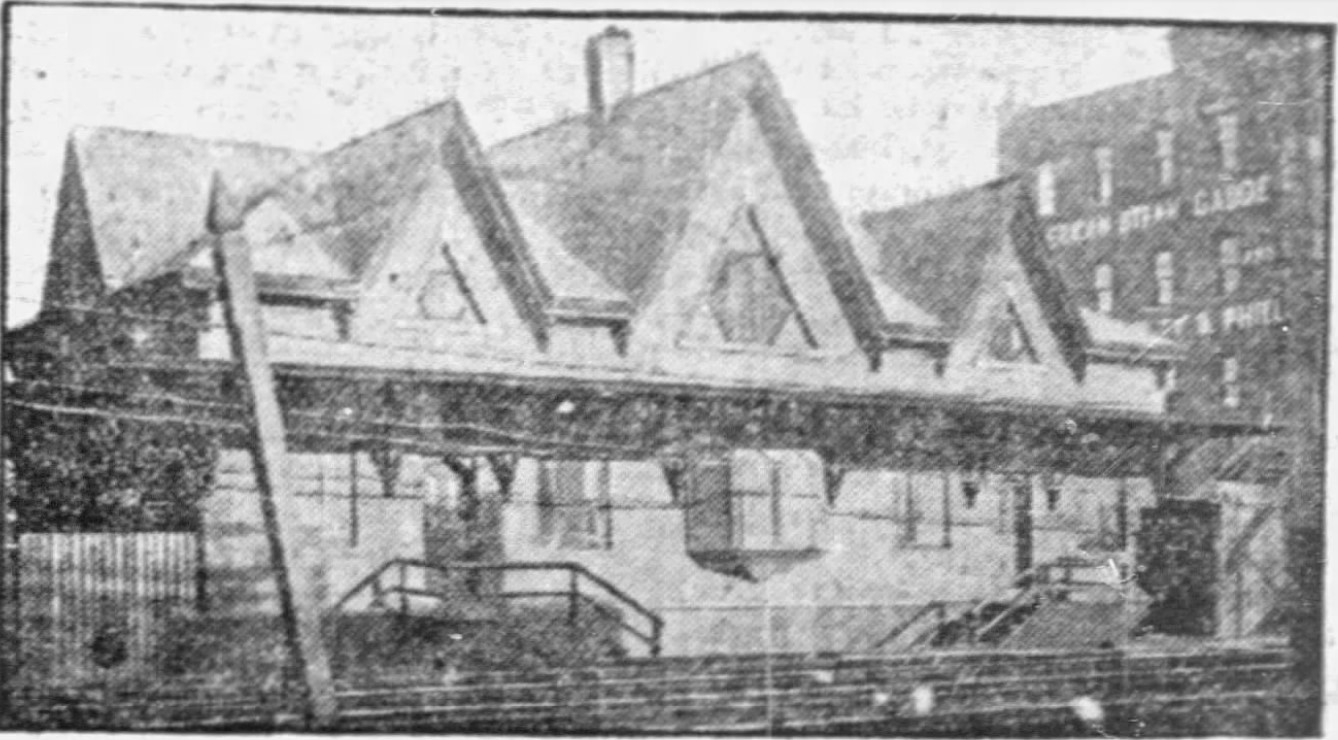
The disused Chickering station in 1906

In September 1872, the B&P purchased a 6,221 square feet (577.9 m^{2}) parcel at Camden Street from the Boston Water Power Company. A station building was under construction by that November. Chickering station, named for the nearby Chickering & Sons piano factory, opened in 1873. The single-story brick structure was located on the south side of the tracks on the northeast side of Camden Street. Chickering station was commonly used by baseball fans attending games at the South End Grounds.

The Old Colony Railroad leased the B&P in 1891. In November 1891, the Old Colony purchased a parcel on the north side of the tracks adjacent to West Chester Park (now Massachusetts Avenue). Although the railroad reportedly intended to build a station there to replace Chickering, it did not do so; the land was instead used for a rail yard. The New York, New Haven and Hartford Railroad acquired the Old Colony in 1893.

Chickering station was closed in 1896 because Back Bay station was under construction just 3,500 feet (1,100 m) to the northeast, and because the West End Street Railway operated frequent streetcar service on nearby Columbus Avenue. A footbridge was built over the tracks connecting Camden Street and Gainsborough Street in 1904. The vacant station building remained extant until at least the 1910s.

Nearby residents and institutions, including the YMCA on Huntington Avenue, petitioned the railroad in 1912 and 1919 to reopen the station. The 1919 petition was opposed by the railroad, which cited low ridership when the station was previously open and a desire not to compete with streetcars. The railroad also did not provide evening service to the inner stations on the line, so the station would not have served the nearby theaters. The petition was rejected by the state Public Service Commission later in 1919.

=== Rapid transit ===
The modern station was constructed as part of the Southwest Corridor project from 1979 to 1987. A $3.9 million construction contract was awarded on May 5, 1983. It opened along with the new southern section of the Orange Line on May 4, 1987. The entire Orange Line, including Massachusetts Avenue station, was closed from August 19 to September 18, 2022, during maintenance work.
