= Central station (MBTA) =

Subway station in Cambridge, Massachusetts, US

Central
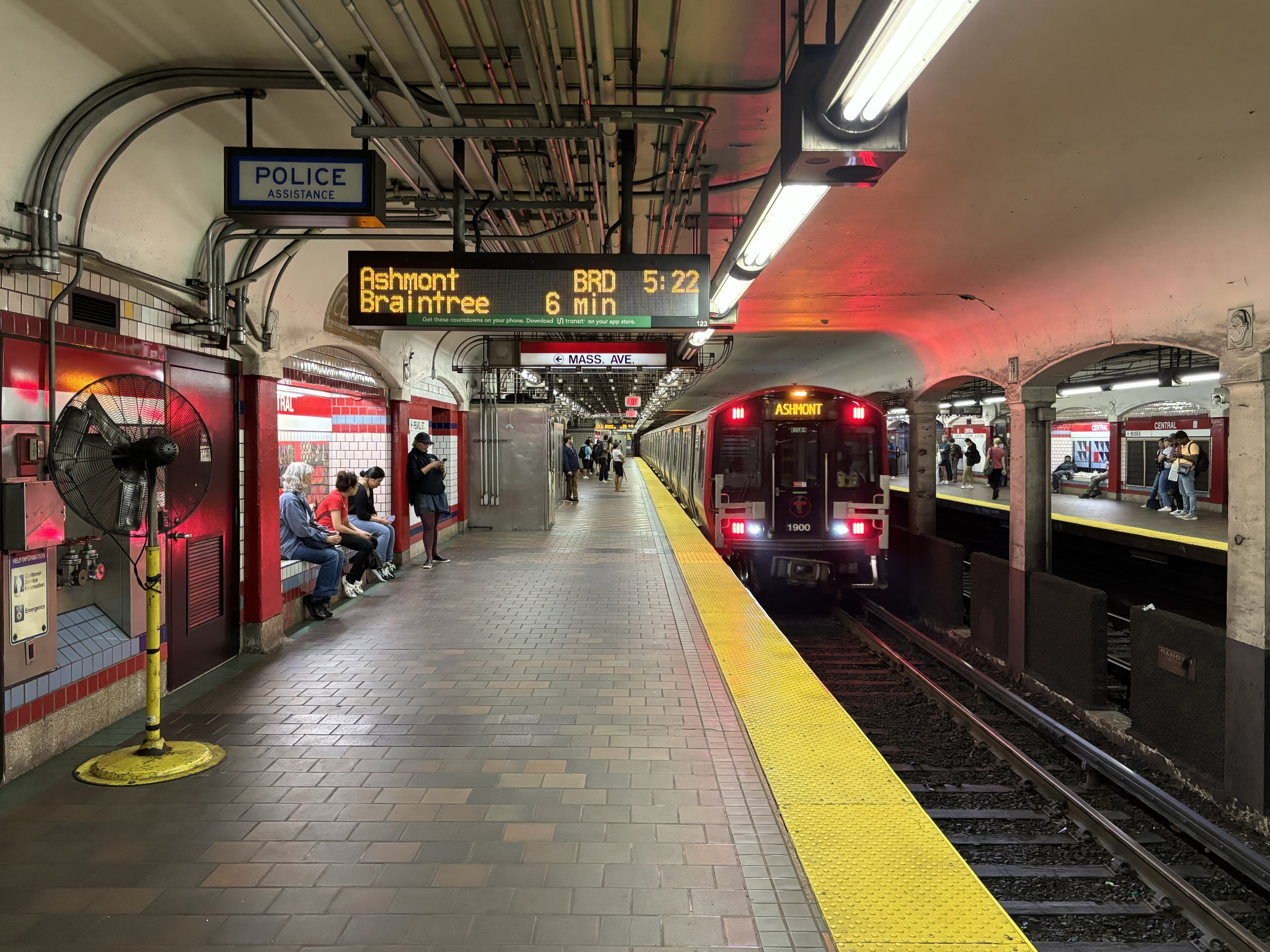
- A southbound train entering Central station in August 2024

General information
- Location: Massachusetts Avenue at Prospect Street; Cambridge, Massachusetts
- Coordinates: 42.3653°N 71.1036°W
- Line: Cambridge Tunnel
- Platforms: 2 side platforms
- Tracks: 2
- Connections: MBTA bus: 1, 47, 64, 70, 83, 91

Construction
- Structure type: Underground
- Cycle facilities: 36 spaces
- Accessible: Yes

History
- Opened: March 23, 1912
- Rebuilt: April 25, 1985–March 9, 1988

Passengers
- FY2019: 15,405 daily boardings

Services
Preceding station	MBTA	Following station
Harvard toward Alewife	Red Line	Kendall/MIT toward Ashmont or Braintree
Track layout
Location

Central station (also called Central Square station) is a Massachusetts Bay Transportation Authority (MBTA) rapid transit station in Cambridge, Massachusetts. It serves the Red Line and has a street-level terminal for the MBTA bus system. It is located at the intersection of Massachusetts Avenue with Western Avenue, Prospect Street, and Magazine Street at Central Square.

== Station design ==
Central station has two side platforms serving the two tracks of the Red Line, which runs northwest–southeast through Central Square under Massachusetts Avenue. Each platform has three sets of stairs, an escalator, and an elevator along its length. The station is accessible. Six MBTA bus routes – 1, 47, 64, 70, 83, and 91 – stop near the station. The station has two works of public art, which were installed in 1988 as part of the Arts on the Line program:

- East Indian, by Elizabeth Mapelli, seven fused glass tile murals behind benches on the platforms
- Circle Square by Anne Storrs and Dennis Cunningham, 100 ceramic tile reliefs mounted above the station columns

== History ==
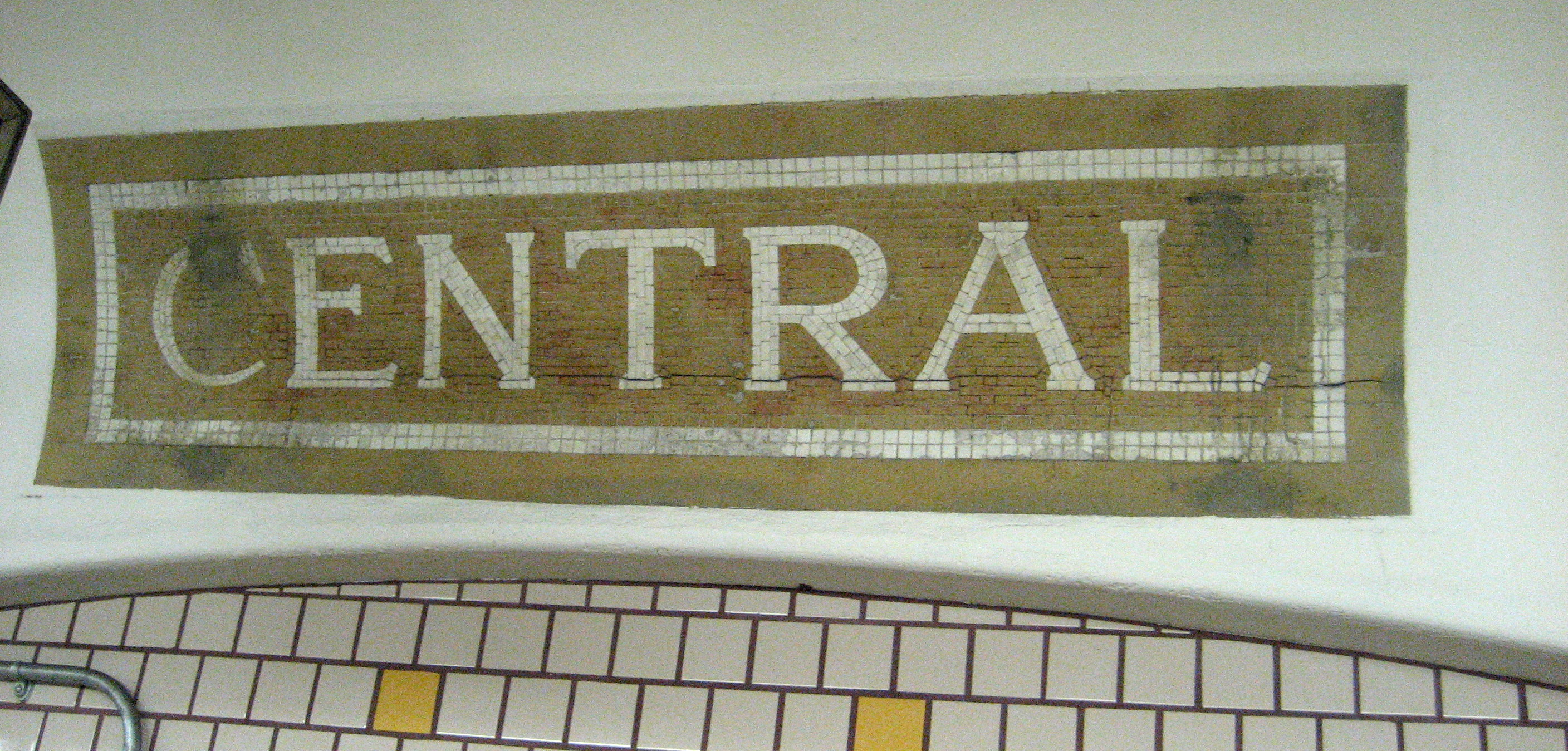
Old tile sign above the platforms

After the success of the 1897-opened Tremont Street Subway, the Boston Elevated Railway (BERy) planned an elevated system with lines to Cambridge, South Boston, Charlestown, and Roxbury. The latter two lines opened in 1901 as the Charlestown Elevated and Washington Street Elevated, while the South Boston line was determined to be infeasible. After debate about running an elevated line above business districts in Cambridge, the BERy agreed in late 1906 to build a line under Beacon Hill in Boston, over a new West Boston Bridge, and under Main Street and Massachusetts Avenue in Cambridge to Harvard Square. Construction began on May 24, 1909. The Cambridge Subway opened from Harvard Square to Park Street Under on March 23, 1912, with intermediate stations at Central Square and Kendall Square.

Kendall Square and Central Square stations had very similar designs, each with two side platforms 270–300 feet (82–91 m) long. The station had one exit and one entrance stairway at each end of each platform; all were 4 feet (1.2 m) wide except for one 6-foot (1.8 m)-wide pair. The platforms and floors were made of granolithic. Station walls were tiled with white enamel, with a buff tile band 6 feet (1.8 m) above the floor and white plaster above. Several original tile mosaics displaying the station name are still in place above the platforms.

=== Renovations ===
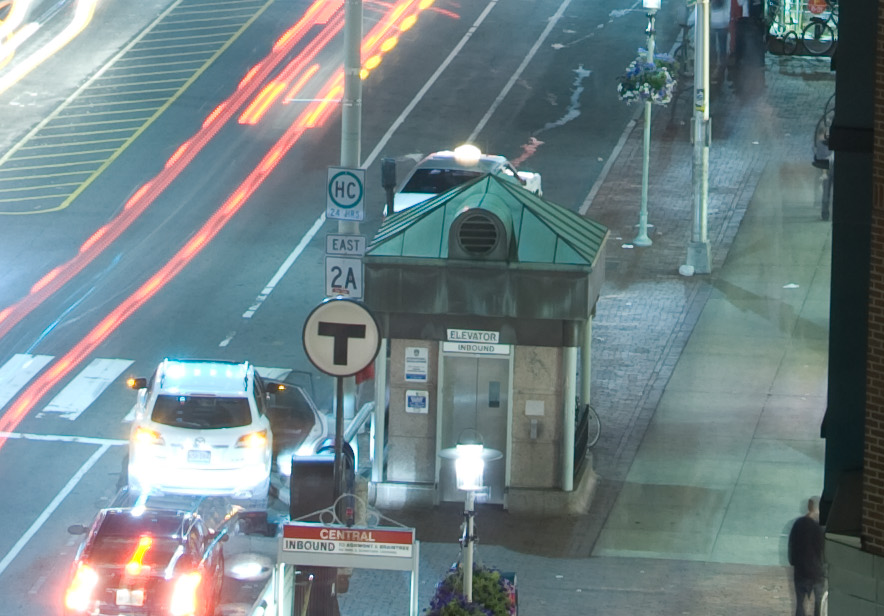
The inbound elevator in 2008, prior to replacement

On January 26, 1978, heavy rains flooded the station. In the mid-1980s, the platforms were extended at many early-built Red Line stations, allowing six-car trains to be run beginning in January 1988. The platforms at Central were extended to the northwest (contrary to original plans for the southeast) beginning on April 25, 1985, with new entrances placed west of Prospect Street. (Extension to the northwest had been previously proposed in 1927 to add the additional entrances.) The $11.2 million project was completed on March 9, 1988.

The MBTA agreed to replace the inbound elevator as part of the 2006 settlement of Joanne Daniels-Finegold, et al. v. MBTA. Notice to proceed was given in June 2017. The elevator was closed on April 9, 2018; due to issues with conduits and a standpipe, completion was delayed by over a year to April 2, 2020.

The MBTA also plans to add two additional elevators to the station and to replace the outbound elevator. Design was completed by May 2022. Bidding for a construction manager at risk for an estimated $95 million contract, including the Central station elevators plus similar work at Downtown Crossing and Park Street, opened in April 2025. The Central work will also include modernization of the inbound escalator, replacement of an emergency generator, and improvements to lighting and wayfinding. Notice to proceed was given in September 2025. As of October 2026, the Central construction is expected to begin in 2027.
