= E.U. Wurlitzer Music and Sound =

E.U. Wurlitzer Music and Sound was a musical instrument retailer and part of the greater Boston music scene from 1890 through 1999. The store moved in the mid-1960s from its Bedford Street location to 360 Newbury Street (on the corner of Massachusetts Avenue), and then settled at 180 Massachusetts Avenue. Several other stores around New England were also opened. In early 1999 the company went bankrupt and closed its seven stores.

In the summer of 1999 the location at Massachusetts Avenue was reopened as Gordon LaSalle Wurlitzer Music by its new owner, Mark Gordon, who owned and operated six stores in Massachusetts and Connecticut. He had purchased the rights to the Wurlitzer name, the wurlitzer.com internet domain, original Boston phone number, and the store's customer mailing list in U.S. Bankruptcy Court earlier that year. He also rehired many of the former employees of the store.

Gordon continued running the store through 2004, when the building which housed the storefront was bought by Berklee College of Music to be demolished and rebuilt as student dormitories. Currently, the E.U. Wurlitzer name now only refers to the Wurlitzer Music of Boston website.
