= Watson's Corner =

Coordinates: 42°23′33.6″N 71°7′29.9″W

Watson's Corner is the historical name for an intersection in Cambridge, Massachusetts, at the corner of Rindge Avenue and Massachusetts Avenue. It was part of a wider area called Watson's Plain in colonial and Revolutionary War times and well into the 19th century.

Watson's Corner gained notability on account of a skirmish that occurred there on April 19, 1775 in connection with the Battles of Lexington and Concord. A marker at 2154 Massachusetts Avenue commemorates the skirmish. An account of this event from the Cambridge city website describes the scene thus:

At Watson’s Corner (the present intersection of Rindge and Massachusetts avenues) Cambridge patriots lay in wait behind a pile of barrels, but were surprised by flanking redcoats. John Hicks and Moses Richardson of Cambridge and Isaac Gardner of Brookline were killed, as was William Marcy, a "simple-minded youth" who thought he was watching a parade.
