= Hynes Convention Center station =

Subway station in Boston, Massachusetts, US

Hynes Convention Center
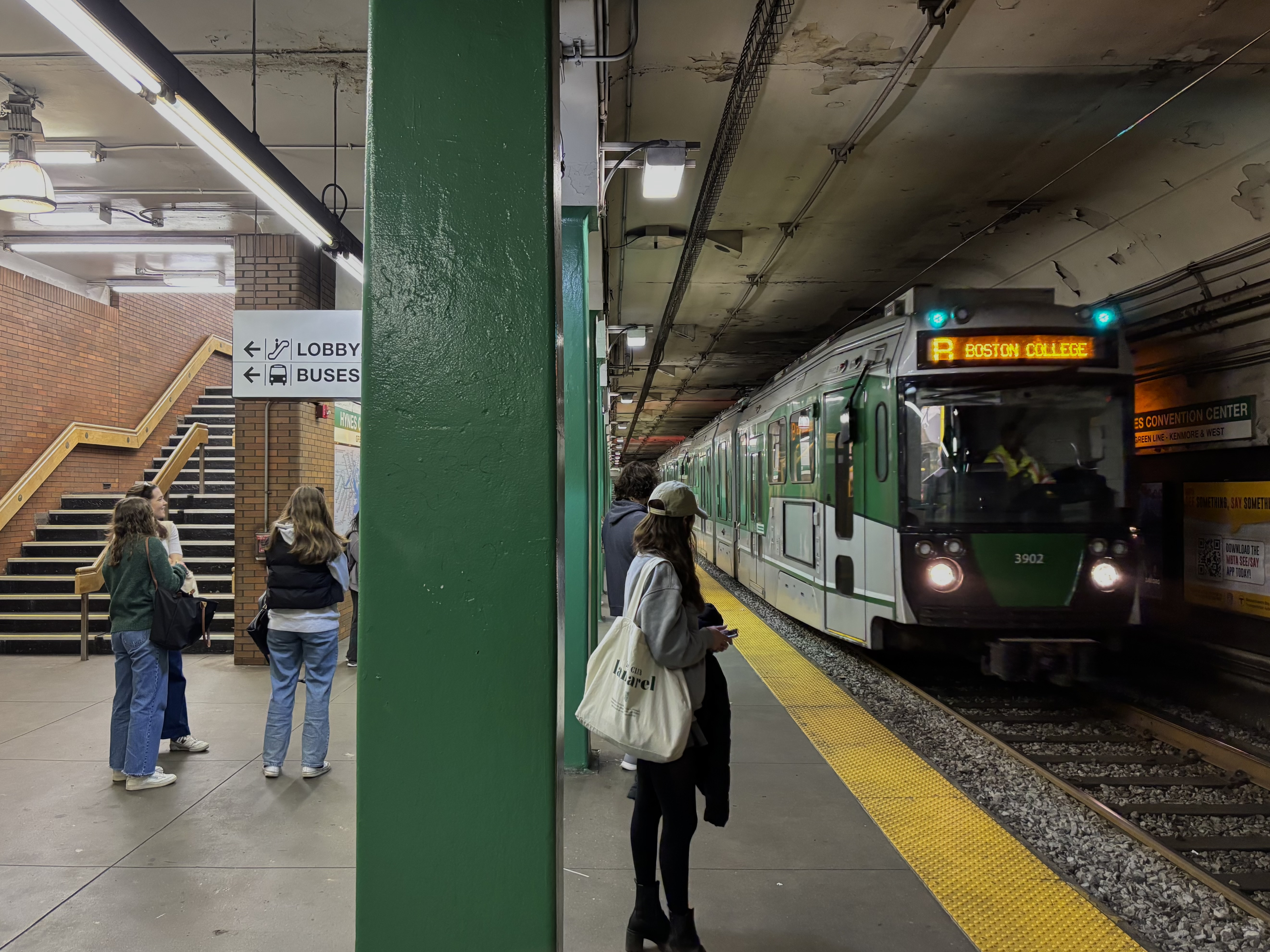
- An outbound train at the station in April 2025

General information
- Location: 360 Newbury Street; Boston, Massachusetts
- Coordinates: 42.3480°N 71.0876°W
- Line: Boylston Street subway
- Platforms: 2 side platforms
- Tracks: 2
- Connections: MBTA bus: 1, 55

Construction
- Structure type: Underground
- Accessible: No

History
- Opened: October 3, 1914
- Former names: Massachusetts (1914–1965); Auditorium (1965–1990); Hynes Convention Center/ICA (1990–2006)

Passengers
- FY2019: 7,041 daily boardings

Services
Preceding station	MBTA	Following station
Kenmore toward Boston College	Green Line B branch	Copley toward Government Center
Kenmore toward Cleveland Circle	Green Line C branch	Copley toward Government Center
Kenmore toward Riverside	Green Line D branch	Copley toward Union Square
Former services
Preceding station	MBTA	Following station
Kenmore toward Watertown	Green Line A branch	Copley toward Park Street
Location

Hynes Convention Center station is an underground light rail station on the Massachusetts Bay Transportation Authority (MBTA) Green Line. It is located at the intersection of Newbury Street and Massachusetts Avenue near the western end of the Back Bay neighborhood of Boston, Massachusetts. The station is named for the Hynes Convention Center, which is located about 700 feet (200 m) to the east along Boylston Street. It has two side platforms serving the two tracks of the Boylston Street subway, which are used by the Green Line B branch, C branch, and D branch. The main entrance to the station from Massachusetts Avenue leads to a fare lobby under the 360 Newbury Street building.

Construction of the station (originally named Massachusetts) began in December 1912; it opened in October 1914 along with the Boylston Street subway for use by the Boston Elevated Railway (BERy). Construction on a surface-level transfer station for streetcars on Boylston Street and Massachusetts Avenue began in April 1918 and was completed the following November. These surface routes were gradually replaced by buses from the 1930s to the 1960s. The transfer station was closed in January 1963 due to construction of the adjacent Massachusetts Turnpike Extension; it was partially demolished.

The newly created MBTA renamed the station Auditorium in 1965, followed by Hynes Convention Center/ICA in 1990 and finally Hynes Convention Center in 2006. A pedestrian tunnel to the southbound bus shelter was opened in 1964, and the Boylston Street entrance was reopened in 1965. Both were closed in the 1980s, though the Boylston Street entrance is still used during the Boston Marathon and major events at the convention center.

Averaging just over 7,000 weekday boardings in a 2019 count, Hynes is the busiest non-accessible MBTA station. A renovation to the station, planned as part of air rights development over the adjacent Massachusetts Turnpike, will make the station accessible and reopen the Boylston Street entrance at all times. A separate development project includes restoration of the pedestrian tunnel.

== Station layout ==
Diagram of the station layout, showing platforms and tracks (green), fare lobbies (yellow), and surface corridors (orange). Unused corridors to the southbound bus shelter and the former surface station are also marked (in blue).

The station is oriented approximately east–west; it lies oblique to the Back Bay street grid inside the block bounded by Massachusetts Avenue on the southwest, Newbury Street on the northwest, Hereford Street on the northeast, and Boylston Street on the southeast. Just east (inbound) of the station, the Boylston Street subway curves slightly to the north to run under Boylston Street; to the west, a curve slightly to the south aligns the tunnel under Newbury Street.

The station has two side platforms serving the line's two tracks. They are narrower at the ends, and wider under a fare lobby near the west end of the station. The primary entrance to the station is from Massachusetts Avenue; a side exit leads from the lobby to Newbury Street. The lobby is inside the basement level of the 360 Newbury Street building. MBTA bus routes 1 and 55 stop near the station.

A normally closed secondary entrance from Boylston Street leads to a smaller fare lobby over the east end of the platforms. That entrance is sometimes opened on Patriot's Day to handle the spectators from the Boston Marathon (when Copley station is closed), as well as for large events like Anime Boston at the convention center. For some events, it is opened for exiting passengers only. The planned station renovations include permanently reopening the entrance.

== History ==
=== Construction ===
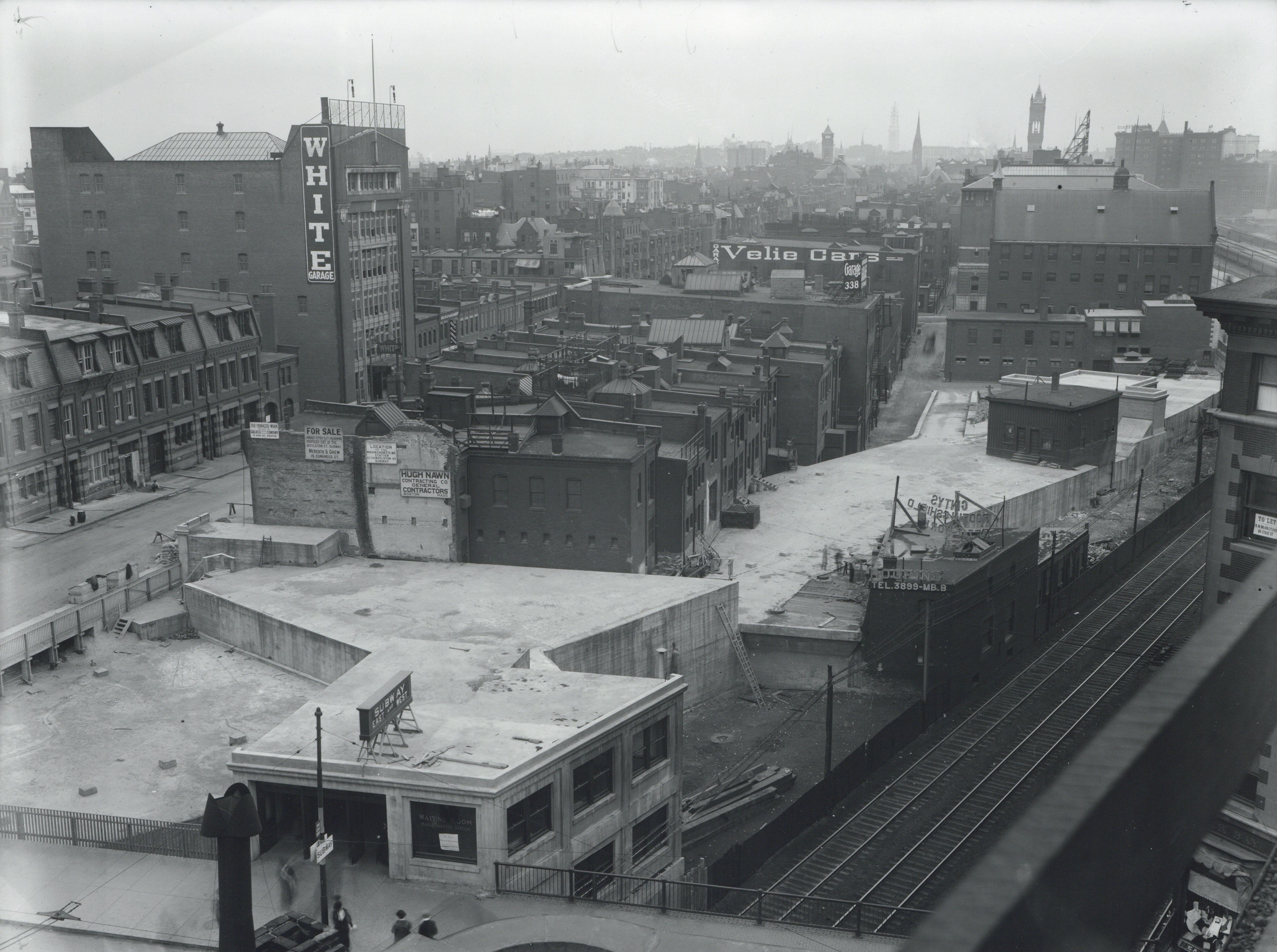
Massachusetts station in 1914, before the surface station was constructed

Plans made in 1907 for a westward extension of the Tremont Street subway called for a line along the south shore of the Charles River, called the Riverbank Subway. Though it was originally planned to have no intermediate stops, in 1910 the Boston Transit Commission (BTC) voted to add stations at Charles Street, Dartmouth Street, and Massachusetts Avenue. However, public opinion quickly shifted to a route under Boylston Street, which was developing rapidly. In July 1911, the Massachusetts legislature passed a bill providing for the construction of several tunnels, including the Boylston Street subway. New stations were to be located at Copley Square – a major civic center – and the Massachusetts Avenue thoroughfare.

Subway construction began in March 1912. On September 24, 1912, the BTC acquired an easement through the Boston Cab Company building for the construction of Massachusetts station. The Hugh Nawn Company, a major local contractor, began work on the station on December 21, 1912. The BTC determined that the Cab Company building was not structurally sound; it purchased the structure on April 3, 1913 and demolished it soon after, allowing construction on the west part of the station to proceed.

Construction was complicated by the soil conditions, as the site was shoreline until the filling of the Back Bay in the 19th century. Wooden and concrete piles were driven through seven feet (2.1 m) of silt to provide a firm foundation for the station, and for future air rights development atop it. The station was built adjacent to the Boston and Albany Railroad cut to the south; one railroad track had to be supported on piles during construction. Although the station was constructed below grade, much of the top of the station was exposed; an alley was constructed on top. Some of the dirt removed during construction was used to fill the Charles River Esplanade near Cottage Farm, while the rest was dumped at sea.

As built, the station was 350 feet (110 m) long and a maximum of 90 feet (27 m) wide. The platforms were constructed three inches (76 mm) above the rails to serve streetcars, but sufficient overhead space was left if later conversion to high platforms for use with metro stock was desired. The station was constructed of reinforced concrete with granolithic platforms and floors. The ceilings and upper walls were finished with white plaster; the lower walls were white terrazzo with red-and-white tile borders. A waiting room for passengers transferring to surface streetcars was located on Massachusetts Avenue next to the main station entrance. The Boylston Street subway, including Massachusetts station, opened on October 3, 1914.

=== Surface station ===
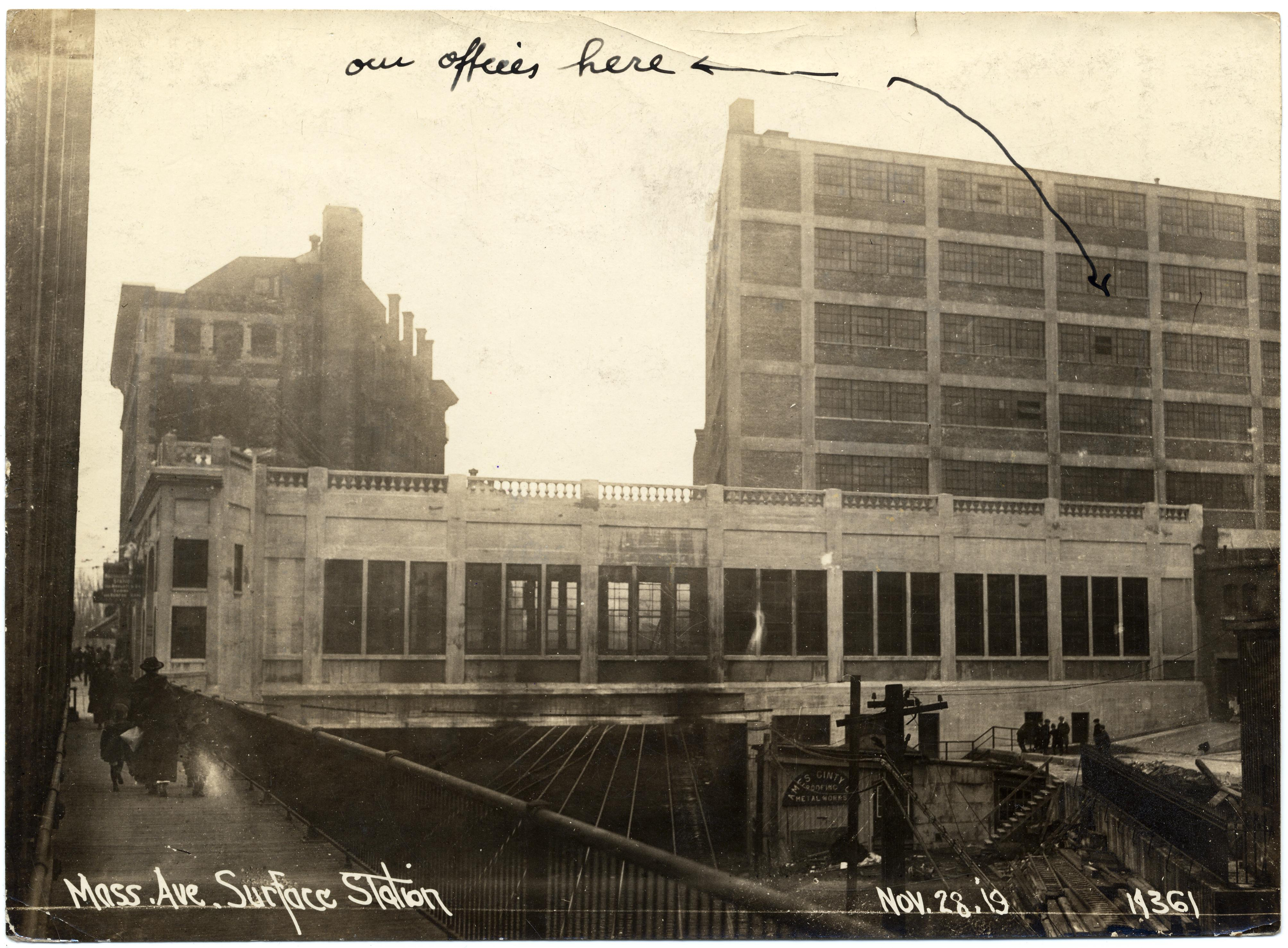
The surface transfer station and the Boston Transit Building in November 1919

In 1917, the Massachusetts General Court passed legislation allowing the Boston Elevated Railway (BERy) to construct prepayment streetcar transfer areas (where passengers paid upon entering the transfer area, rather than on board the streetcar) at existing subway and elevated stations. Soon after, BERy asked the Boston Transit Commission to build such a structure at Massachusetts station. In November 1917, the Public Service Commission approved BERy's plans to construct the transfer station as a bridge between Newbury Street and Boylston Street over the B&A tracks.

A reinforced concrete building was built with two tracks and a 27-foot-wide (8.2 m) island platform. Staircases connected it to both subway platforms and the fare mezzanine, with faregates providing access from Newbury and Boylston streets. Streetcars from either direction on both Massachusetts and Boylston could reach the transfer station, then either loop back to their original or continue in the other three directions. Construction began on February 4, 1918, and demolition of buildings was completed by April 5.

The surface station opened on November 29, 1919. The BERy estimated that the number of daily transfers at the location would increase from 20,000 to 30,000. The transfer station was served by streetcars on the Harvard–Dudley line that ran on Massachusetts Avenue, and the Ipswich Street line (Park Street–Chestnut Hill) which ran on Boylston Street. The Ipswich Street line was cut back from Park Street on June 13, 1925, with Massachusetts station as the new eastern terminal. The Harvard–Dudley route went through several reconfigurations in the 1930s, some of which used Massachusetts station as a terminal. It was split into Harvard–Massachusetts (later route 76) and Massachusetts–Dudley (later route 47) routes on November 30, 1936.

In 1917, a private firm began construction on an Arthur Bowditch-designed office building above the main headhouse. The seven-story building was completed in October 1919. In January 1920, the BERy moved its offices into the building, as its lease at 101 Milk Street was expiring. The BERy used the upper floors of the building, then known as the Transit Building, as its offices until 1926. Later known as 360 Newbury Street, the building has served a variety of tenants; its late-1980s renovation was designed by Frank Gehry.

=== Bus replacement ===
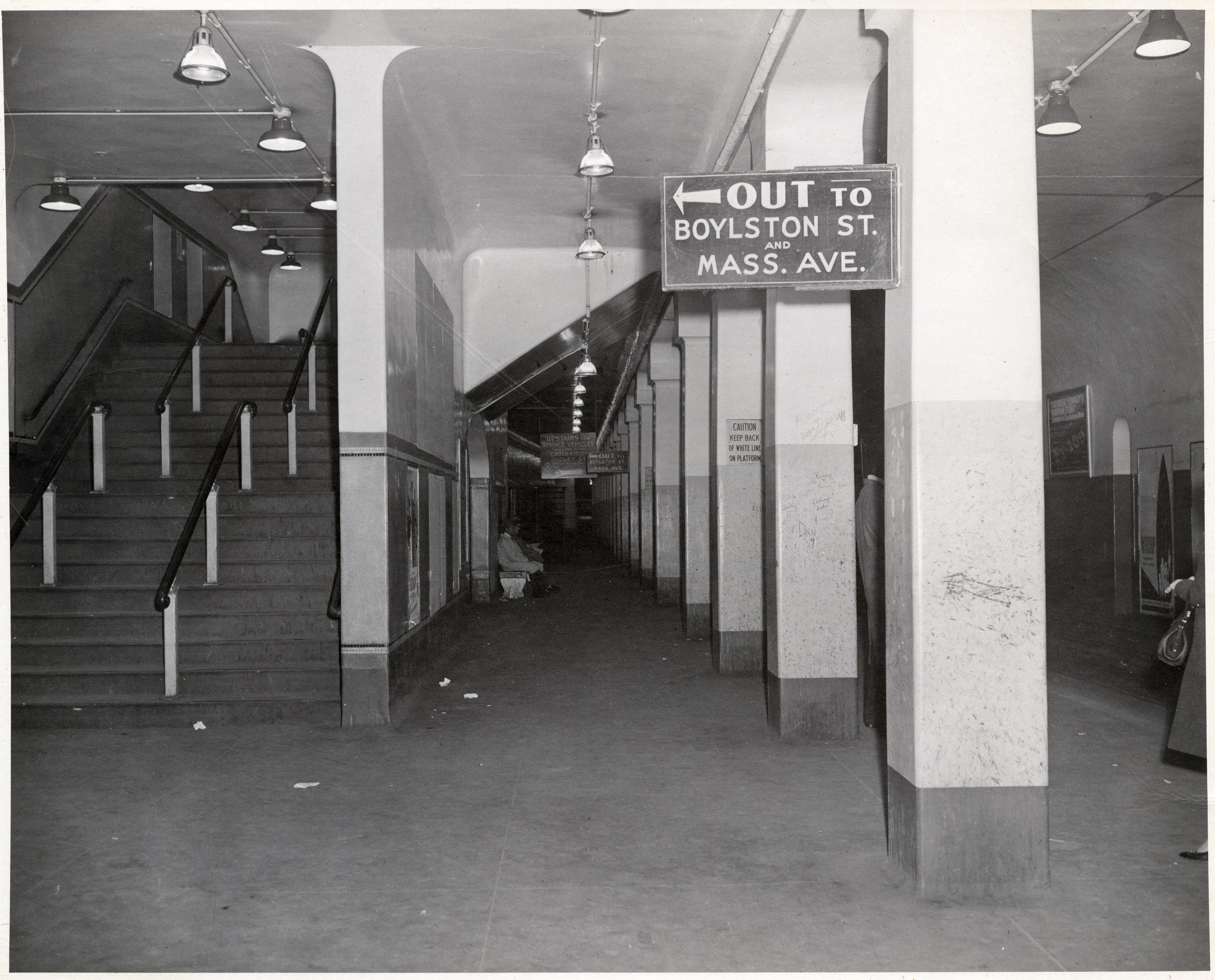
The outbound subway platform in 1962

The first bus route to serve the station was a Bowdoin Square–Fenway route (later route 54), which began operation in 1925 when the Ipswich Street line was cut back. It did not use the transfer station until December 13, 1930, when the Fenway loop was cut. In 1931, the BERy completed an electrical substation with two 3-megawatt mercury arc rectifiers next to the station. The Boylston Street subway was extended to Kenmore station in October 1932. Much of the Ipswich Street line was replaced by buses in 1932 and 1933 due to paving of the Worcester Turnpike. The final segment was replaced by a short bus route (later route 55), still terminating at the surface station, in July 1934.

Route 76 was partially operated with buses in 1939–1942 and 1946–1949. It was converted fully to buses on September 12, 1949, and to trolleybus on April 22, 1950. The Boylston Street end of the surface station was modified in late 1949 to accommodate the trolleybuses. Route 47 was replaced with buses off-peak on April 17, 1948, and fully on September 12, 1953. Route 76 was converted back to diesel bus on April 1, 1961. Route 54 was cut back to Copley Square in December 1960; route 55 was extended east to Copley in December 1976.

In the early 1960s, the Massachusetts Turnpike Extension was built along the Boston and Albany Railroad corridor, necessitating a major widening of that right-of-way. Routes 47 and 76 were through-routed as route 1 in September 1962 to eliminate looping at the surface station, which was permanently closed on January 21, 1963. The portion closer to Boylston Street was demolished soon after. The remaining section fronting on Newbury Street is used as an MBTA traction power substation, with two large rectifier transformers in the rear. The facade is frequently covered in graffiti art; the sidewalk in front is used by buskers and a food truck.

A large dedicated bus shelter was built across Massachusetts Avenue for southbound riders in 1963. On November 16, 1964, the newly formed MBTA opened a pedestrian tunnel from the bus shelter to the subway station's fare lobby, allowing riders to cross under busy street traffic. The completion of the Prudential Tower and the adjacent Prudential Center complex in 1965 (on what had previous been rail yards) increased the number of riders accessing the station from the Boylston Street direction. On April 19, 1965, the MBTA reopened the former headhouse on Boylston Street, diagonally across from the Prudential complex.

=== MBTA era ===
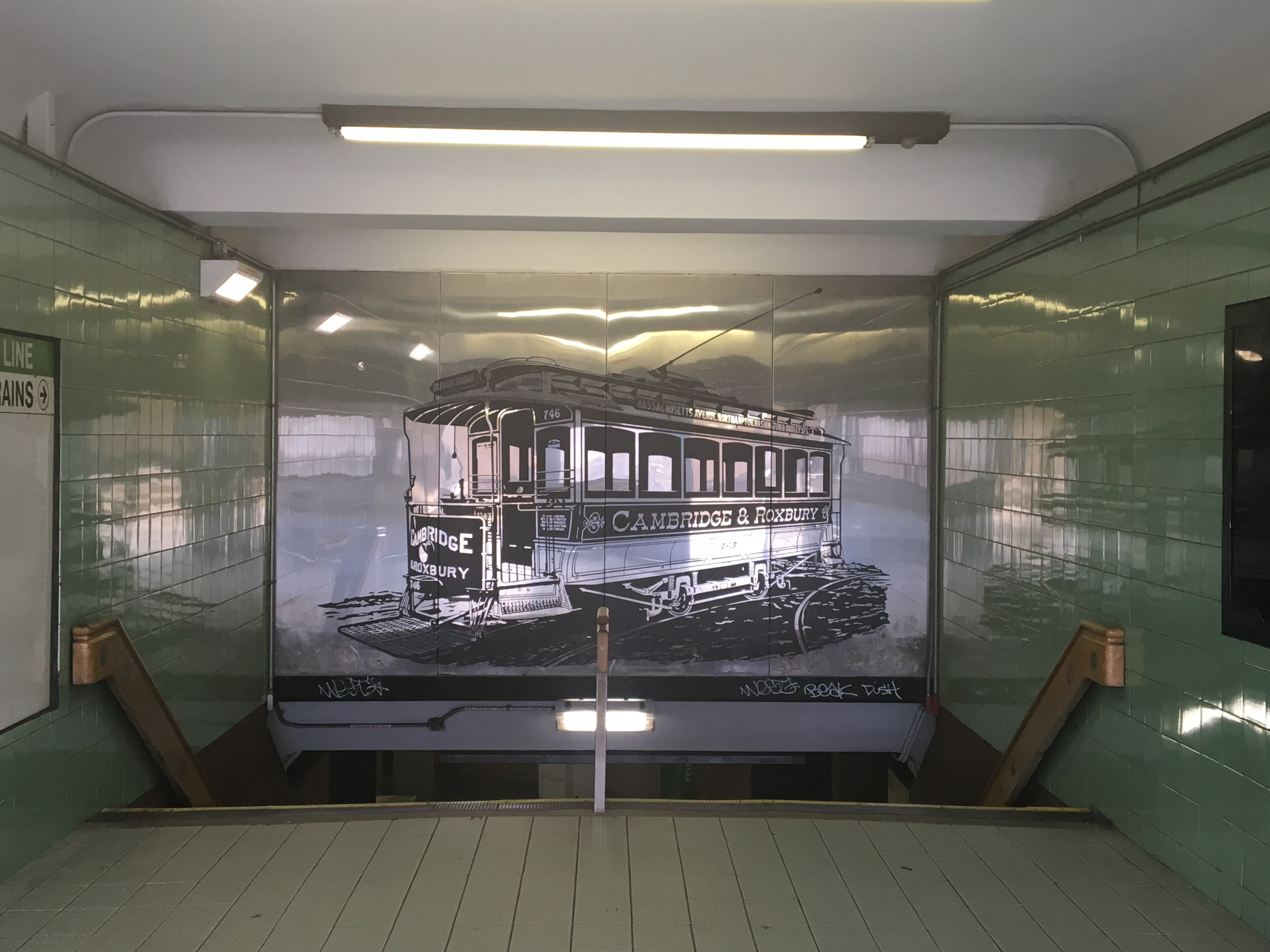
A 1977-created mural of a Harvard–Dudley streetcar inside the main entrance

The BERy was replaced by the Metropolitan Transit Authority (MTA) in 1947; it was in turn replaced by the Massachusetts Bay Transportation Authority (MBTA) in 1964. Massachusetts station originally served streetcars on the Watertown (after 1967, Green Line A branch), Boston College (B branch), and Cleveland Circle (C branch) lines. The Riverside Line (D branch) opened on July 4, 1959; the A branch was replaced with the route 57 bus (which terminates at Kenmore) on June 21, 1969. The station was renamed to Auditorium on February 18, 1965, upon the completion of the War Memorial Auditorium (later renamed John B. Hynes Memorial Auditorium).

The MBTA began a modernization of the station – part of a $14 million renovation of seven subway stations – in 1975. It was completed on August 31, 1977. The project included two pieces of public art. A 7-foot (2.1 m)-tall metal sculpture - Constellations, by Dennis Kowal - was installed in the Boylston Street entrance in 1975. A 8-by-12-foot (2.4 m × 3.7 m) silk-screened enamel mural of a Harvard–Dudley streetcar was placed inside the main entrance in 1976–77. In 1980, Morgan Bulkeley installed a 45-by-18-foot (13.7 m × 5.5 m) mural on the Newbury Street face of the former streetcar station. Entitled "Tramount" after the former Trimount hill, it interweaves elements of Boston's history with geometric forms.

The pedestrian tunnel to the southbound bus shelter was closed in the early 1980s due to security concerns. The Boylston Street entrance was closed on January 3, 1981, as part of extensive cutbacks that included closing Bowdoin and Symphony. The Auditorium was replaced by the Hynes Convention Center in 1988; two years later, the station was renamed Hynes Convention Center/ICA after the new building and the nearby Institute of Contemporary Art. In late 2006, the station was renamed a third time to Hynes Convention Center as the ICA relocated from to a new building on the South Boston Waterfront. Largely forgotten since the entrance closed, Constellations was moved to Wentworth Institute of Technology in 2012.

=== Planned renovations ===
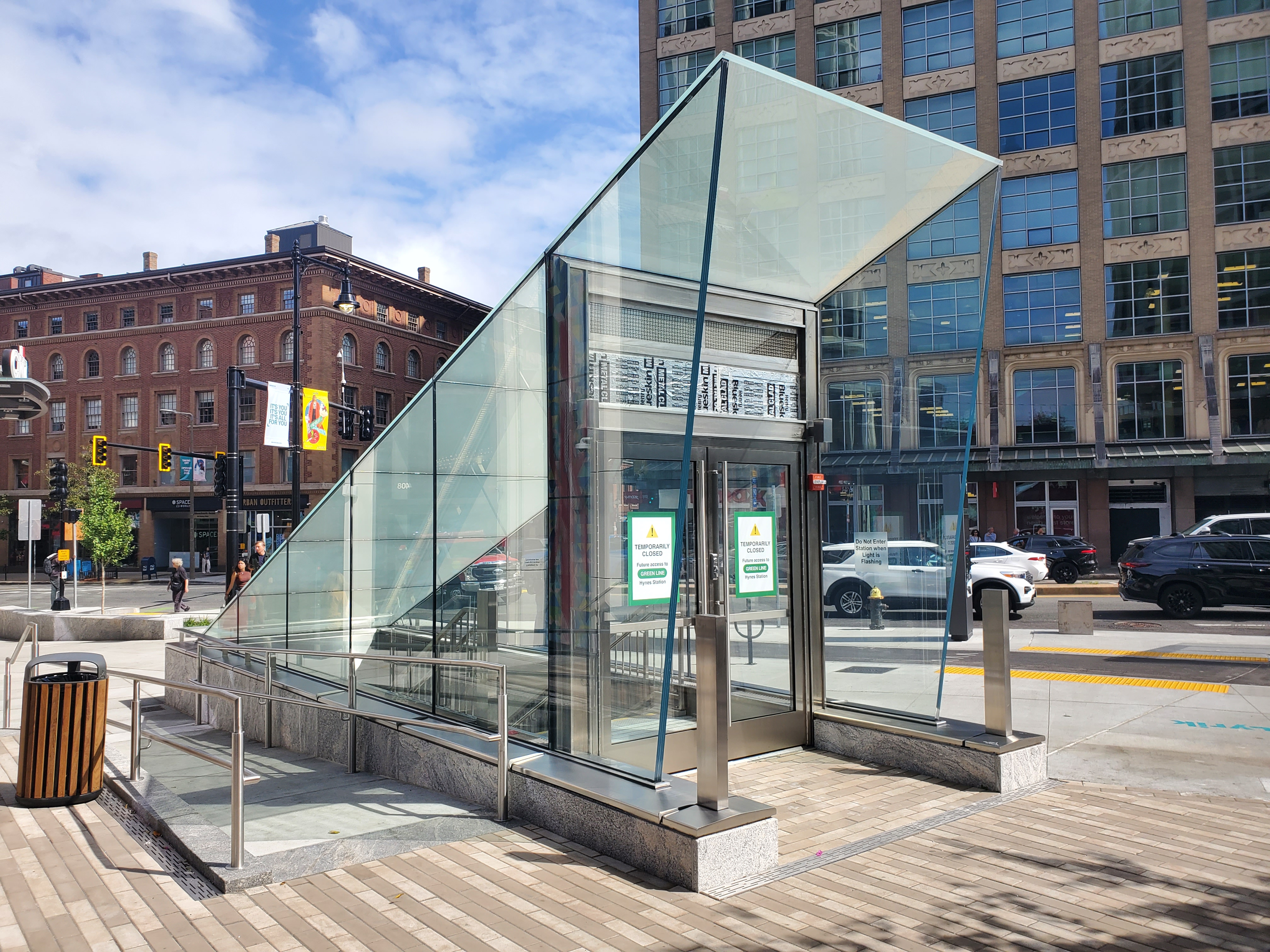
The not-yet-open west headhouse in 2024

Averaging just over 7,000 weekday boardings in 2019, Hynes is the busiest non-accessible MBTA station. A design contract for accessibility renovations at Hynes Convention Center, Symphony, and Wollaston was awarded on May 5, 2010. This preliminary (15%) design was completed in March 2013. On September 3, 2014, MassDOT opened bidding on air rights development over the Massachusetts Turnpike on Parcel 13 next to the station. As part of the project, the developer was to be required to renovate Hynes Convention Center station with elevators for accessibility, as well as reopening both the tunnel under Massachusetts Avenue and the disused Boylston Street headhouse.

In November 2015, MassDOT approved plans for a development called "The Viola" on the site, with construction to begin in 2019. The developer, Peebles Corporation, was to work with the MBTA to design the renovated station, but would not perform the construction work. Instead, Peebles was to provide $30.5 million of the estimated $45.7 million station cost; the MBTA would obtain the remaining funds and organize the renovation. The development would relocate part of the Massachusetts Avenue entrance slightly south into the new structure.

Peebles was to have responsibility for the headhouse renovations, while the MBTA would have responsibility for the platform level. In December 2019, the MBTA awarded a $11.5 million, 33-month design contract for the accessibility renovations. Peebles began the permitting process for the 432,000-square-foot (40,100 m^{2}) development, which was to include a hotel and condominiums, in February 2020. Design was 30% complete by May 2022; it was then placed on hold pending plans from the developer. In 2023, with the development stalled, the MBTA resumed design work independently. The revised design work reached 30% complete in March 2024, at which point the MBTA paused work pending funding availability. As of 2025, construction cost is estimated at $85 million; Hynes Convention Center (if funding is not found) and Boylston are expected to be the only Green Line stations not made accessible by 2030.

A separate air rights development on the west side of Massachusetts Avenue (Parcel 12) included a new entrance and elevator to the station. Construction of that project began in July 2020 and was largely completed in 2024, though the entrance did not open at that time. The existing pedestrian tunnel will require renovations for accessibility.
