= Route 1 (MBTA) =

Bus route in Greater Boston

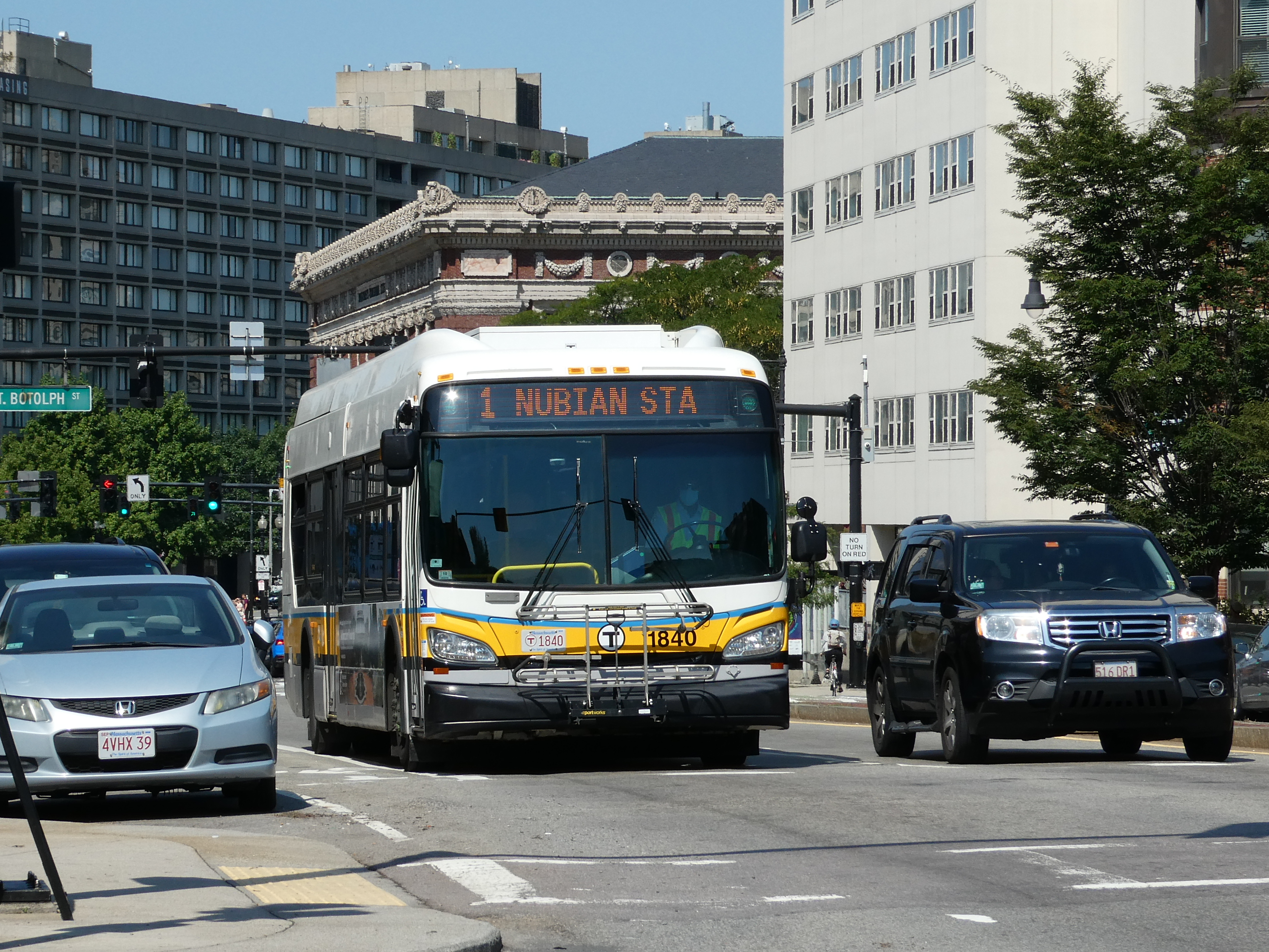
- A route 1 bus on Massachusetts Avenue in September 2022

Overview
- System: MBTA bus
- Garage: Albany Garage and Cabot Garage
- Began service: May 16, 1896 (as streetcar line)

Route
- Locale: Boston and Cambridge, Massachusetts
- Start: Harvard Square
- End: Nubian station
- Length: 4.6 miles (7.4 km) eastbound; 4.4 miles (7.1 km) westbound
- Daily ridership: 12,000 (2018)
- Timetable: Route 1

Route 1 is a local bus route in Boston and Cambridge, Massachusetts, United States, operated by the Massachusetts Bay Transportation Authority (MBTA) as part of MBTA bus service. It operates between Harvard Square and Nubian station, primarily along Massachusetts Avenue. A major crosstown route, it is among the highest-ridership routes in the system, with service every 15 minutes or less during all operating hours.

The West End Street Railway began operating a crosstown through route between Harvard Square and Dudley Square (now Nubian Square) in 1896. Most portions of the route had originated as opened by three companies between 1856 and 1887, while the Harvard Bridge opened to streetcars in 1892. The Boston Elevated Railway (BERy) extended the line to North Cambridge carhouse by 1907 but cut it back to Harvard Square in 1912.

Traffic congestion on Massachusetts Avenue prompted several changes to the route in the 1930s, culminating in a 1936 split into Harvard–Massachusetts and Massachusetts–Dudley routes. The Harvard–Massachusetts route was partially operated with buses in 1939–1942 and 1946–1949. It was converted fully to buses in 1949, then to trolleybuses from 1950 to 1961. Off-peak service on the Massachusetts–Dudley route was converted to buses in 1948; peak service was converted in 1953. The two routes were merged into a Harvard–Dudley route in September 1962. It was designated route 1 later that decade.

Route 1 was temporarily rerouted over the Boston University Bridge from 1983 to 1987 during rebuilding of the Harvard Bridge. It was rerouted in 1987 to serve Boston City Hospital (later Boston Medical Center). The MBTA added crosstown route CT1, a limited-stop service between Central Square and the hospital, in 1994. A number of stops were closed in 2013 to reduce travel times, while several segments of bus lanes were added beginning in 2018. A 2018–19 MBTA review of its bus system found that route 1 suffered from crowding and poor reliability. Route CT1 was merged into route 1 in 2019.

== Route ==
Route 1 runs between Harvard Square in Cambridge and Nubian station in the Roxbury neighborhood of Boston. A crosstown route, it does not enter downtown Boston. From Nubian, the route runs northeast on Washington Street, southeast on Melnea Cass Boulevard, and northeast on Albany Street to the Boston Medical Center. It continues northwest on Massachusetts Avenue, passing through the South End and Back Bay neighborhoods before crossing the Charles River on the Harvard Bridge. Entering Cambridge, it passes through the Massachusetts Institute of Technology (MIT) campus and Central Square. The route terminates on Massachusetts Avenue at Holyoke Street on the east side of Harvard Square. Nubian-bound buses loop on Dunster Street and Mount Auburn Street, rejoining Massachusetts Avenue at Putnam Square.

Scheduled one-way running times range from about 40 minutes off-peak to 50 minutes at peak, with shorter times during early mornings and late nights. Service operates from about 5:00 am to 1:00 am Monday through Thursday, from about 5:00 am to 2:00 am Fridays and Saturdays, and from about 6:00 am to 1:00 am on Sundays. As of August 2025, headways are 15 minutes or less at all operating hours (except after 1:00 am on Friday and Saturday nights). It operates as a crosstown route, with MBTA subway connections at Harvard (Red Line), Central (Red Line), Hynes Convention Center (Green Line – B, C, and D branches), Symphony (Green Line E branch), and Massachusetts Avenue (Orange Line), plus Silver Line connections at Massachusetts Avenue, Melnea Cass Boulevard, and Nubian.

Route 1 runs as a local route with standard local bus fare. In 2018, the route averaged 12,000 boardings on weekdays, placing it among the highest-ridership routes in the MBTA bus system. Average weekend ridership was 9,600 on Saturdays and 6,700 on Sundays. The route is operated with standard 40-foot (12 m) transit buses based at Albany Garage and Cabot Garage in Boston.

== History ==
=== Early history ===
Map showing the horsecar systems around Boston as of 1886

Most portions of what became route 1 originated as horsecar lines opened by three companies in the 19th century:

- The Cambridge Railroad was the first horsecar system to open in the Boston area. It opened its first line between Central Square and Beacon Hill via Main Street (part of which is now Massachusetts Avenue), the West Boston Bridge, and Charles Street on March 26, 1856. The next month, extensions opened west to Brattle Square via Harvard Square, and east to downtown Boston.
- The Metropolitan Railroad opened a horsecar line between Dudley Square (now Nubian Square) and downtown Boston via Washington Street on September 17, 1856.
- The Highland Street Railway opened a line on Columbus Avenue between Northampton Street in the South End and downtown Boston on June 30, 1877. Both the Highland and the Metropolitan began regular service on the line on July 2. An extension on Northampton Street to the Highland's existing line on Shawmut Avenue opened later that year, allowing through service to Dudley Square. A further extension on August 21, 1882, included Northampton Street between Shawmut Avenue and Washington Street.
- The Metropolitan opened a horsecar line on West Chester Park between Marlborough Street in Back Bay and Columbus Avenue on October 4, 1879. Service initially ran between Beacon Street and Lenox Street via West Chester Park, Columbus Avenue, Northampton Street, and Tremont Street.

The West End Street Railway purchased and merged all the horse railroads in the Boston area in 1887. On January 3, 1889, the West End opened its first electric line – the Beacon Street line. It used West Chester Park between Beacon Street and Boylston Street; the block between Beacon and Marlborough was new trackage. The eastern portion of the line, including West Chester Park, used conduit electrification until it was converted to conventional overhead lines on July 9, 1889. The Brattle Square–Boston line was electrified on February 16, 1889.

The West End quickly electrified its system and built new lines. Northampton Street between Shawmut Avenue and Washington Street was part of a line electrified on May 10, 1890. The Washington Street line was electrified on November 28, 1891. Northampton Street between Shawmut Avenue and Tremont Street was electrified by December 1891. Northampton Street west of Tremont Street, Columbus Avenue, and West Chester Park between Columbus Avenue and Huntington Avenue were electrified by October 1892. By late 1895, the entire system was electric except the Marlborough Street line.

On August 15, 1892, the West End opened an electric streetcar line over the new Harvard Bridge, including new trackage on Front Street in Cambridge between Lafayette Square and the bridge. Service ran between Harvard Square and downtown Boston. Over the next several years, additional lines from Cambridge and beyond were routed over the bridge. West Chester Park was renamed Massachusetts Avenue on March 1, 1894; Front Street and Main Street (between Lafayette Square and Harvard Square) in Cambridge were similarly renamed later that year. On May 16, 1896, the West End began operating a crosstown through route between Harvard Square and Dudley Square via Massachusetts Avenue, Columbus Avenue, Northampton Street, and Washington Street. Service initially operated every 10 minutes.

=== Streetcar changes ===
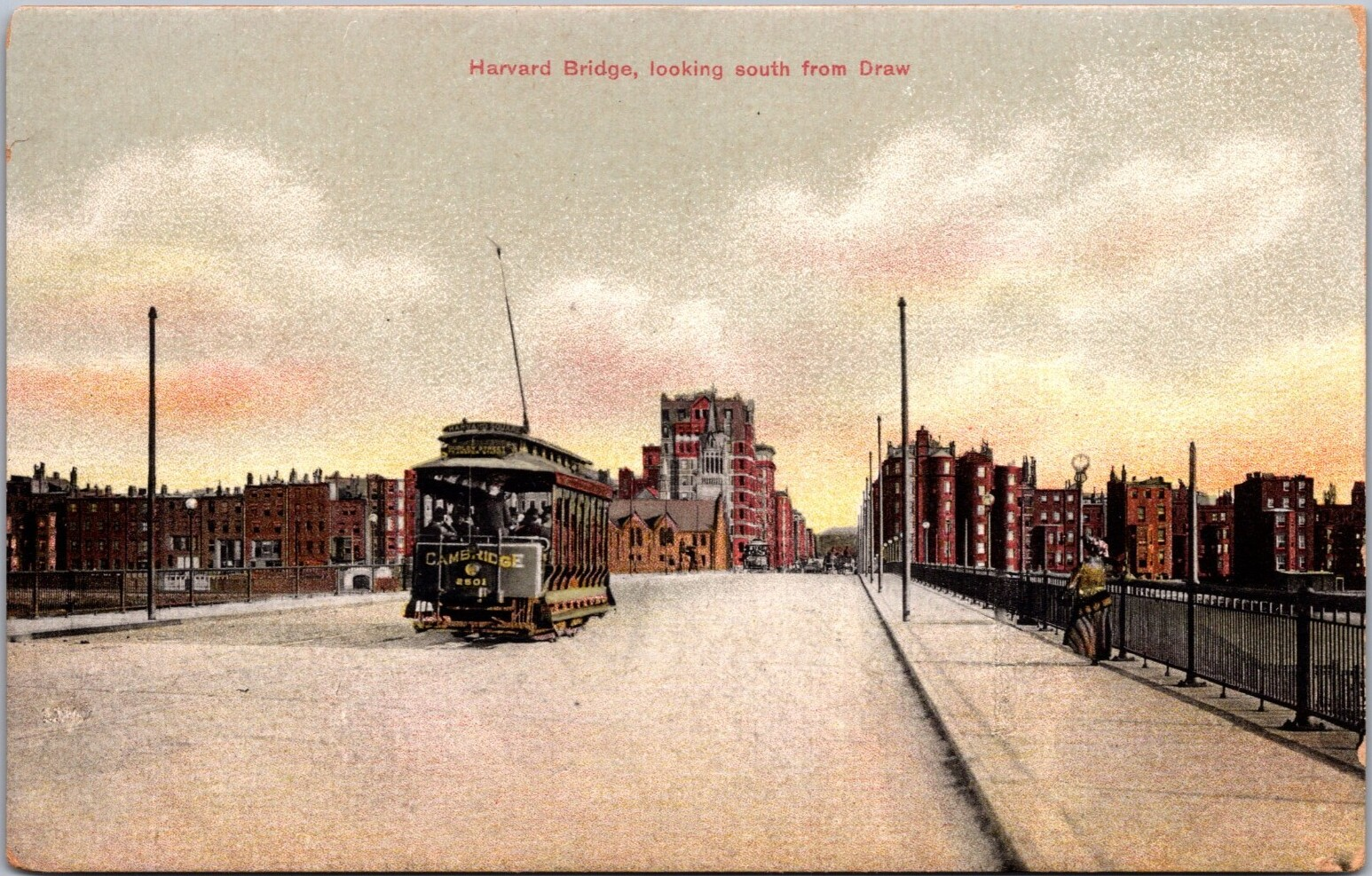
Postcard of a Harvard–Dudley streetcar on the Harvard Bridge, c. 1907–1915

The first phase of the Tremont Street subway, a streetcar subway in downtown Boston, opened on September 1, 1897. Routes on Boylston Street could enter the subway through the Boylston Street portal to reach Park Street station. Several of the Harvard Bridge routes were rerouted into the subway when it opened; others were rerouted over the following year. On October 1, 1897, the Boston Elevated Railway (BERy) acquired the West End Street Railway. By April 1898, ridership over the bridge had almost doubled. The first part of the Main Line Elevated opened on June 19, 1901, with Dudley Street Terminal as its southern end. Overnight "Owl" service on the line was added on August 8, 1906.

By 1907, the Harvard–Dudley line had been extended north along Massachusetts Avenue from Harvard Square to the North Cambridge carhouse. It shared track with numerous other routes, including 10 routes that used the Harvard Bridge to reach the subway from Cambridge and further points. Construction of the Cambridge Subway under Massachusetts Avenue caused streetcar detours in 1910. Temporary tracks were used on Austin Street (now Bishop Allen Boulevard) between Central Square and Lafayette Square, and on Mount Auburn Street between Harvard Square and Putnam Square. Work between Central Square and Putnam Square was done by shield tunneling, which allowed the surface streetcar tracks on that segment to stay in use.

The Cambridge Subway opened between Harvard station and downtown Boston on March 23, 1912. The through routes from northern and western suburbs were cut back from downtown Boston to Harvard station. The North Cambridge–Dudley line was shortened to a Harvard–Dudley line. It still shared the Harvard Bridge with several other routes, including a Harvard Square–Park Street line and a North Cambridge–Roxbury Crossing line. On September 3, 1912, the BERy added a North Cambridge–Dudley streetcar line that supplemented the Harvard–Dudley line. It ran less frequently than the Harvard–Dudley line, with service every 15 minutes at peak hours and every 30 minutes at other times. That month, the BERy also began testing a double-articulated streetcar on the Harvard–Dudley line. It was constructed from two older streetcars and was intended to provide additional capacity on busy lines.

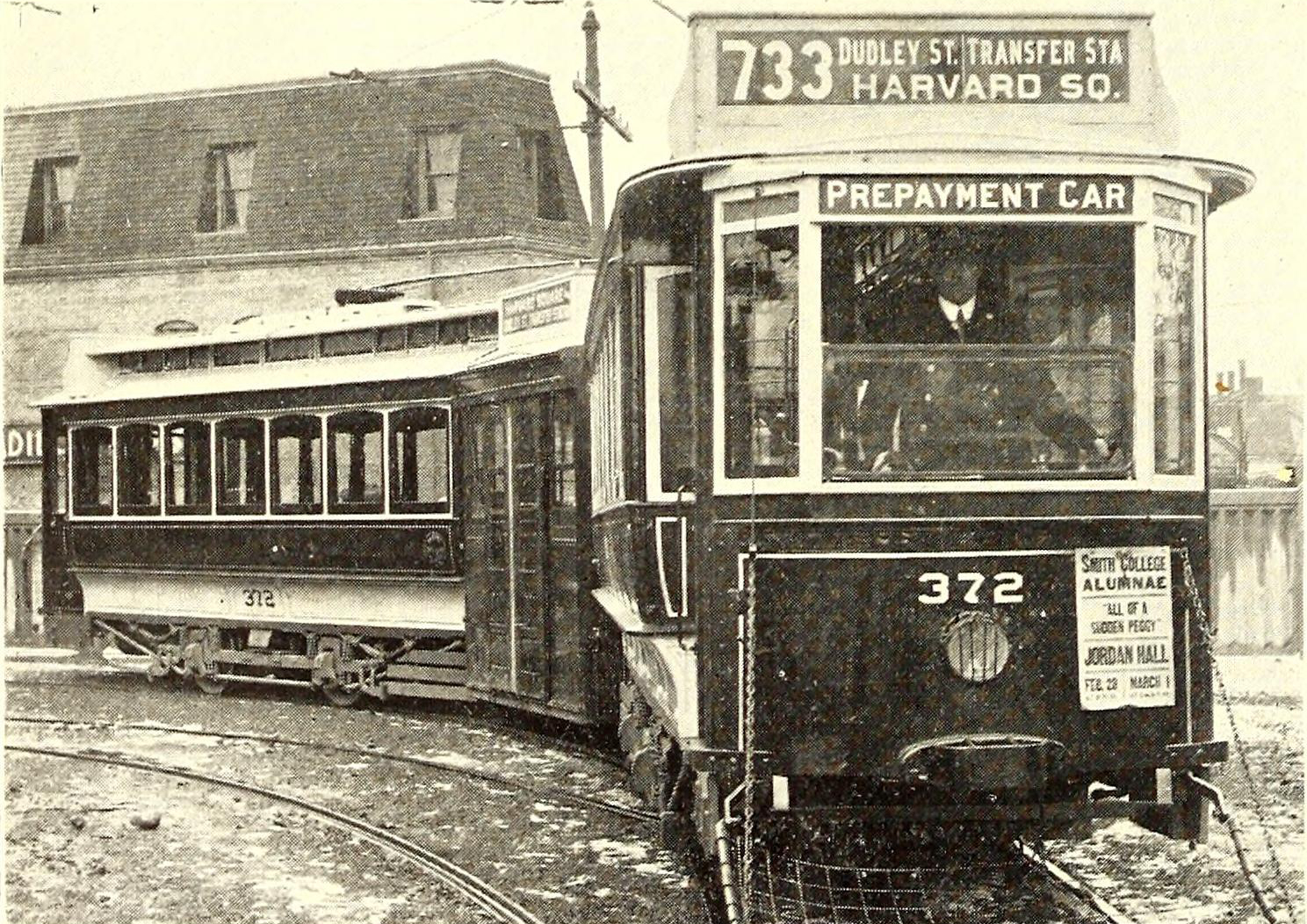
Double-articulated streetcar on the Harvard–Dudley line in 1913

The Boylston Street subway opened on October 3, 1914, as a westward extension of the Tremont Street subway. It prompted a number of changes to streetcar lines; a line running between Central Square and Park Street via the Harvard Bridge was discontinued. Transfer was available between the other Harvard Bridge lines and the subway at Massachusetts station. Other lines supplemented the Harvard–Dudley line on portions of its route. By November 1914, afternoon peak service between Central Square and Dudley Square operated every 90 seconds (40 streetcars per hour).

By 1917, the Harvard–Dudley line operated every five minutes (12 streetcars per hour) outside of peak hours. The only other all-day line to use the Harvard Bridge operated between River Street (in Cambridge) and Park Street station. That year, the Massachusetts General Court passed legislation allowing the BERy to construct prepayment streetcar transfer areas (where passengers paid upon entering the transfer area, rather than on board the streetcar) at existing subway and elevated stations. On November 29, 1919, the BERy opened a prepayment transfer station at Massachusetts station. It was located slightly east of Massachusetts Avenue; streetcars on the Harvard–Dudley line detoured into the transfer station via Newbury Street and Boylston Street.

On August 23, 1924, the deteriorated Harvard Bridge – which the Harvard–Dudley line used to cross the Charles River – was closed to all traffic. The Harvard–Dudley line was temporarily separated into two sections. One operated in Cambridge between Harvard Square and Memorial Drive; the other operated between Massachusetts station and Dudley Square. Harvard–Dudley streetcar service resumed on November 4, 1924, after repairs to the bridge. By that time, service on the line typically operated with center-entrance streetcars, which were sometimes operated as two-car trains. By 1930, Type Five streetcars were used instead.

=== Splitting and merging ===
The Harvard–Dudley line was among the last surface streetcar lines to operate near downtown Boston. Traffic congestion on Massachusetts Avenue – one of the region's main roads – increased during the 1920s. (Note: Three underpasses were built to allow cross traffic to pass under Massachusetts Avenue in attempts to alleviate traffic congestion. They opened at Memorial Drive in 1931, Commonwealth Avenue in 1938, and Huntington Avenue in 1941.) This prompted changes to the Harvard–Dudley line in an attempt to make service more reliable. On June 7, 1930, the northwest end of the route was cut back to Central Square. The Harvard–Central segment was served instead by a Harvard–Kendall Square bus route.

On July 26, 1930, the corridor was instead split into two routes. One route operated between Harvard Square and Lenox Street Carhouse (on Tremont Street just south of Massachusetts Avenue); the other operated between Massachusetts station and Dudley Square. Additional rush hour short turn service operated between Central Square and Lenox Street Carhouse. Owl service continued to operate over the full Harvard–Dudley route. Massachusetts–Dudley–Fields Corner service, originally introduced in October 1920, was cut back to Dudley–Fields Corner service on June 27, 1931. Massachusetts–Dudley service was increased at that time. By August 1931, service again operated the full route between Harvard and Dudley. Owl service on the line was converted to buses on June 23, 1934; by 1937, the Owl service operated hourly.

Several additional service configurations were tried during the 1930s. The route was ultimately split into Harvard–Massachusetts and Massachusetts–Dudley routes in 1936. In 1940–41, the BERy reassigned the public route numbers used for its services; those numbers have remained relatively consistent since. The Harvard–Massachusetts route was numbered 76; the Massachusetts–Dudley route was numbered 47. Rationing of rubber tires and gasoline began after the United States entered World War II. As a result, Owl service on the Harvard–Dudley route and several other routes was converted back to streetcars on June 20, 1942. The routes were converted back to buses in 1945 as rationing was loosened. The BERy was replaced by the Metropolitan Transit Authority (MTA) in 1947.

==== Harvard–Massachusetts route ====
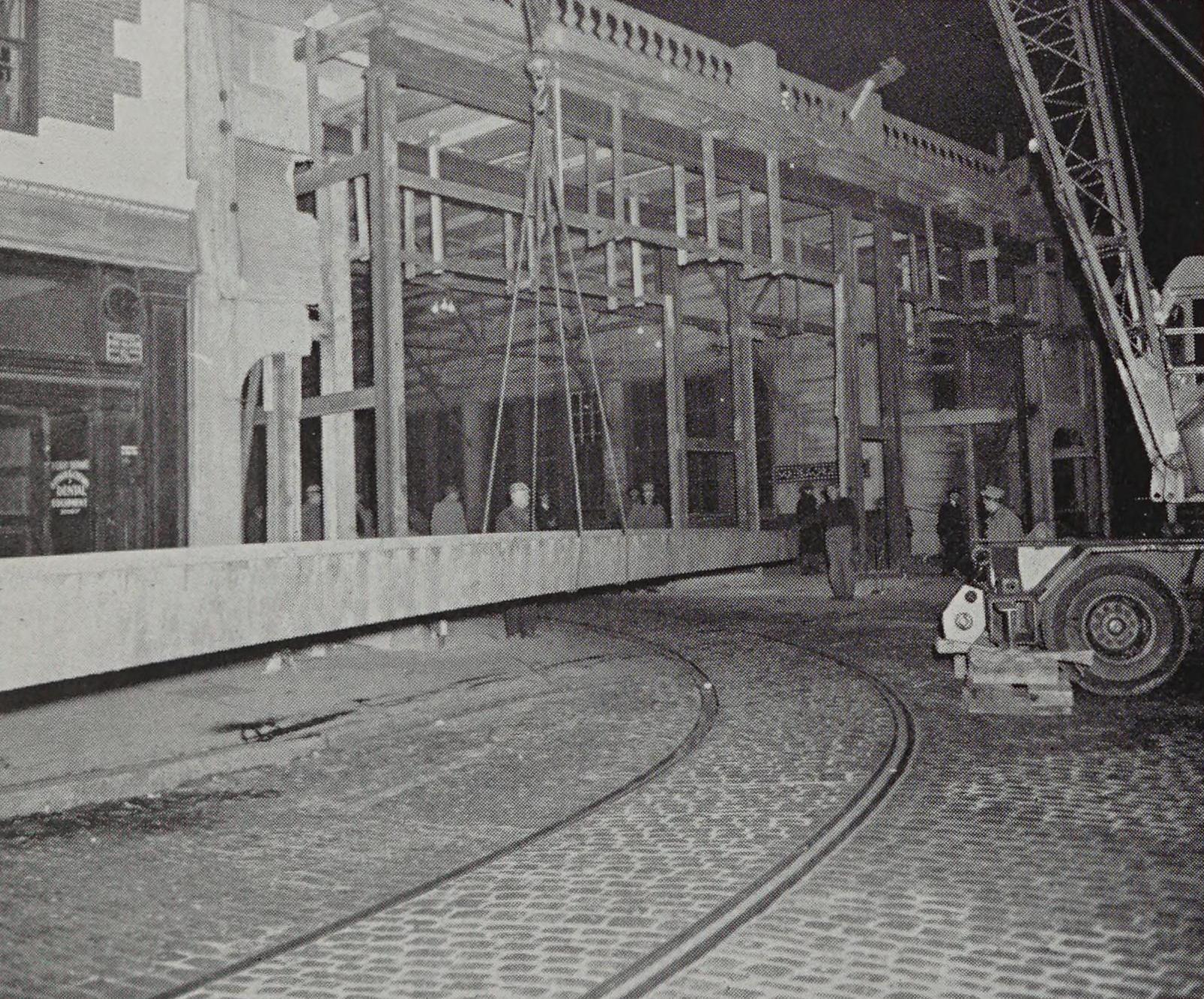
The surface transfer station at Massachusetts station being modified in 1949 for trolleybus use

While Harvard–Massachusetts route 76 saw high ridership, the BERy desired to reduce costs by substituting buses at less-busy times. On September 9, 1939, route 76 was cut back to a Central–Massachusetts route at most times. It continued to operate to Harvard at weekday rush hours, Saturdays until 9 am, and Sundays. At other times, buses operated between Harvard Square and Lafayette Square. The buses were extended to MIT on November 18, 1939, supplementing the streetcars between Central Square and MIT. Effective February 10, 1940, streetcar service only operated at peak hours; at other times, buses operated the full route between Harvard and Massachusetts station. All weekend service was converted to buses on September 14, 1940. However, beginning May 2, 1942, all service on the route was operated by streetcars due to wartime rationing.

In the 1940s, streetcars on route 76 were based out of Bennett Street Carhouse near Harvard Square. They ran a short distance on Mount Auburn Street and Brattle Street to Harvard Square, then followed Massachusetts Avenue to Boylston Street. There, they looped on Boylston Street and onto the east track at the Massachusetts surface station, then onto Newbury Street and Massachusetts Avenue for the return trip. Round-trip running time was scheduled for 36 minutes. In April 1945, the line ran every 3.5 minutes during the morning peak, every 9 minutes during midday, every 4 minutes at the afternoon peak, and every 10 minutes during the evening, for a total of 164 daily round trips. Rush hour service required 11 streetcars. Concrete "safety islands" (boarding platforms) were located at many stops. All service was provided by Type Five streetcars.

The mixed bus and streetcar operation resumed on March 30, 1946, after wartime rationing was loosened. Three additional round trips operating between Harvard Square and a crossover at the Cambridge Armory near Vassar Street in the afternoon peak were added on June 23, 1947. Streetcar operation on the full Harvard–Massachusetts line ended on September 12, 1949, when the Harvard Bridge was closed for repaving. The MTA installed a temporary crossover at Memorial Drive. For one week, streetcar service operated between Harvard Square and Memorial Drive. A bus route between Harvard Square and Lafayette Square was added. Owl service north of Massachusetts station was replaced with a Harvard Square–Scollay Square route via Massachusetts Avenue and Vassar Street.

The MTA began removal of the Harvard Bridge tracks on September 16, 1949. On September 19, the Watertown–Central Square streetcar service was extended to Memorial Drive, and the Harvard Square–Memorial Drive service ended. In October, the MTA removed the switches at Harvard Square and Central Square that allowed streetcars to access the tracks between those points. The tracks were removed by the city soon after. The bridge reopened on November 11, 1949; shortly thereafter, the Harvard–Massachusetts route resumed as an all-bus route, with a supplementary Quincy Square–Vassar Street route at peak hours. Harvard–Dudley Owl service also resumed.

On April 22, 1950, the MTA replaced buses on the Harvard–Massachusetts route with trackless trolleys (trolleybuses) – part of a larger system in the area. The supplementary route was also converted. (Note: In the morning, short turn trolleybuses looped counterclockwise on Massachusetts, Vassar, and Main. They looped clockwise in the afternoon.) At peak hours, the full route and the supplementary route each operated on six-minute headways, collectively using 15 trolleybuses. Service on the full route operated every 8–9 minutes middays and 7 1/2–12 minutes evenings. The trolleybuses were based out of Bennett Street Carhouse. The conversion to trolleybuses required reconstruction of one end of the Massachusetts surface station, which took place in late 1949.

==== Massachusetts–Dudley route ====
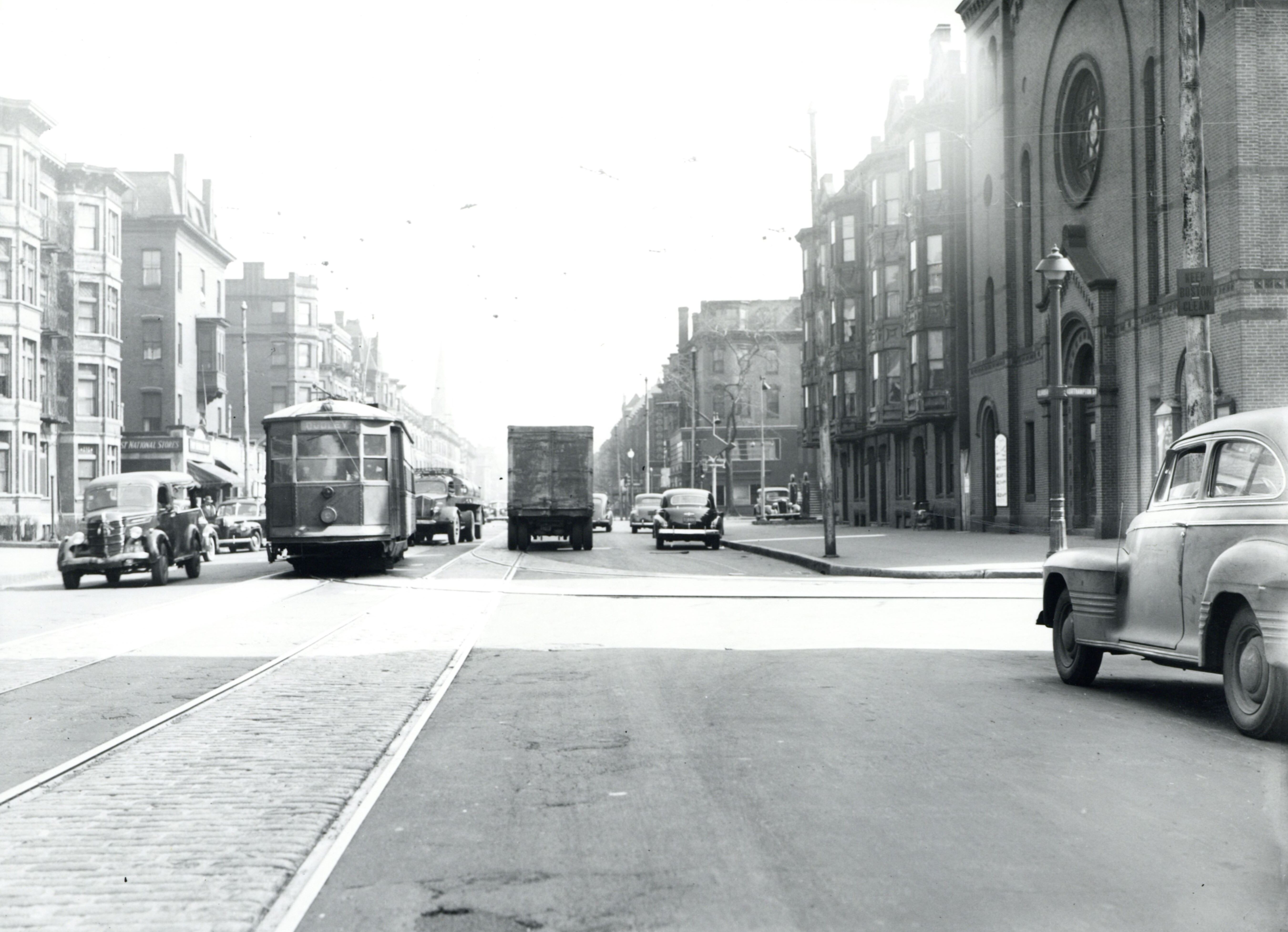
Route 47 streetcar on Columbus Avenue in 1942

In the 1940s, streetcars on route 47 were based out of City Point Carhouse in South Boston. Streetcars looped clockwise on Massachusetts Avenue and Newbury Street through the Massachusetts surface station, boarding on the western track. They turned onto Boylston Street then Massachusetts Avenue, which they followed as far as Columbus Avenue. After running southwest for a block on Columbus, they followed Northampton Street and Washington Street to Dudley Square station. They pulled into the south surface boarding area at the station to discharge passengers, then looped on Warren Street to pick up passengers in the north boarding area. Round-trip running time was scheduled for 28 minutes. In March 1945, streetcars operated every 2.6 minutes during the morning peak, every 9 minutes during midday, every 4 minutes at the afternoon peak, and every 6 minutes during the evening, for a total of 207 daily round trips. Rush hour service required 13 streetcars in the morning and 9 in the afternoon. All service was provided by Type Five streetcars.

In early 1947, streetcars began using the east track at Massachusetts station sharing it with route 76. On April 17, 1948, most route 47 service was replaced by buses to reduce operating costs. Streetcars continued to operate at weekday peak hours and on Saturdays until 9:40 am. Unlike streetcars, buses were routed directly on Massachusetts Avenue between Columbus Avenue and Washington Street. The Owl buses were also changed to this routing. By September 1950, streetcars operated every 3 minutes during the morning peak and 4 minutes in the afternoon peak. The other streetcar lines based at City Point – routes 7, 9, and 10 – were all converted to bus in 1953. With the carhouse set to close, route 47 was converted fully to buses on September 12, 1953.

=== MBTA ===
Owl service ended systemwide on June 25, 1960, as a cost-cutting measure. By that time, Owl service on the corridor was a Central Square–Dudley Square–Cleary Square route. Most of the remaining trackless trolley routes were converted to buses between 1961 and 1963; route 76 was converted March 31, 1961. (Note: Longtime general manager Edward Dana, who retired in 1959, had been a proponent of trackless trolleys. His successor, Thomas McLernon, saw them as antiquated and moved to replace them with buses.) Construction of the Massachusetts Turnpike into Boston required the Massachusetts surface station to be closed. Routes 47 and 76 were merged into Harvard–Dudley route 47 in September 1962; the surface station closed on March 21, 1963. A large dedicated bus shelter was built on the west side of Massachusetts Avenue for southbound riders in 1963. A pedestrian tunnel between the subway station and the shelter opened on November 16, 1964.

The Massachusetts Bay Transportation Authority (MBTA) took over service from the MTA in August 1964. The route was renumbered 1 around 1967, with the new number reflecting its high ridership. From June to December 1972, midday Dudley-bound buses looped via Massachusetts Avenue, Harrison Avenue, and Northampton Street to serve Boston City Hospital. Beginning in September 1979, some late-night service was routed via Boston City Hospital. On March 24, 1979, parts of Harvard Square were closed to traffic for construction of the Red Line Northwest Extension. Route 1 was cut back from Brattle Square to Harvard Square. It initially looped via Dunster Street; this was soon changed to a loop around Harvard Yard via Quincy Street and Bow Street.

In July 1983, the Harvard Bridge was closed to buses and trucks due to structural deterioration. Route 1 was detoured via Commonwealth Avenue, the Boston University Bridge, and Vassar Street. The detour was initially operated without stops; local stops on Commonwealth Avenue were added in December 1983. Route 1 resumed its normal routing in May 1987 when the first phase of bridge repairs was completed.

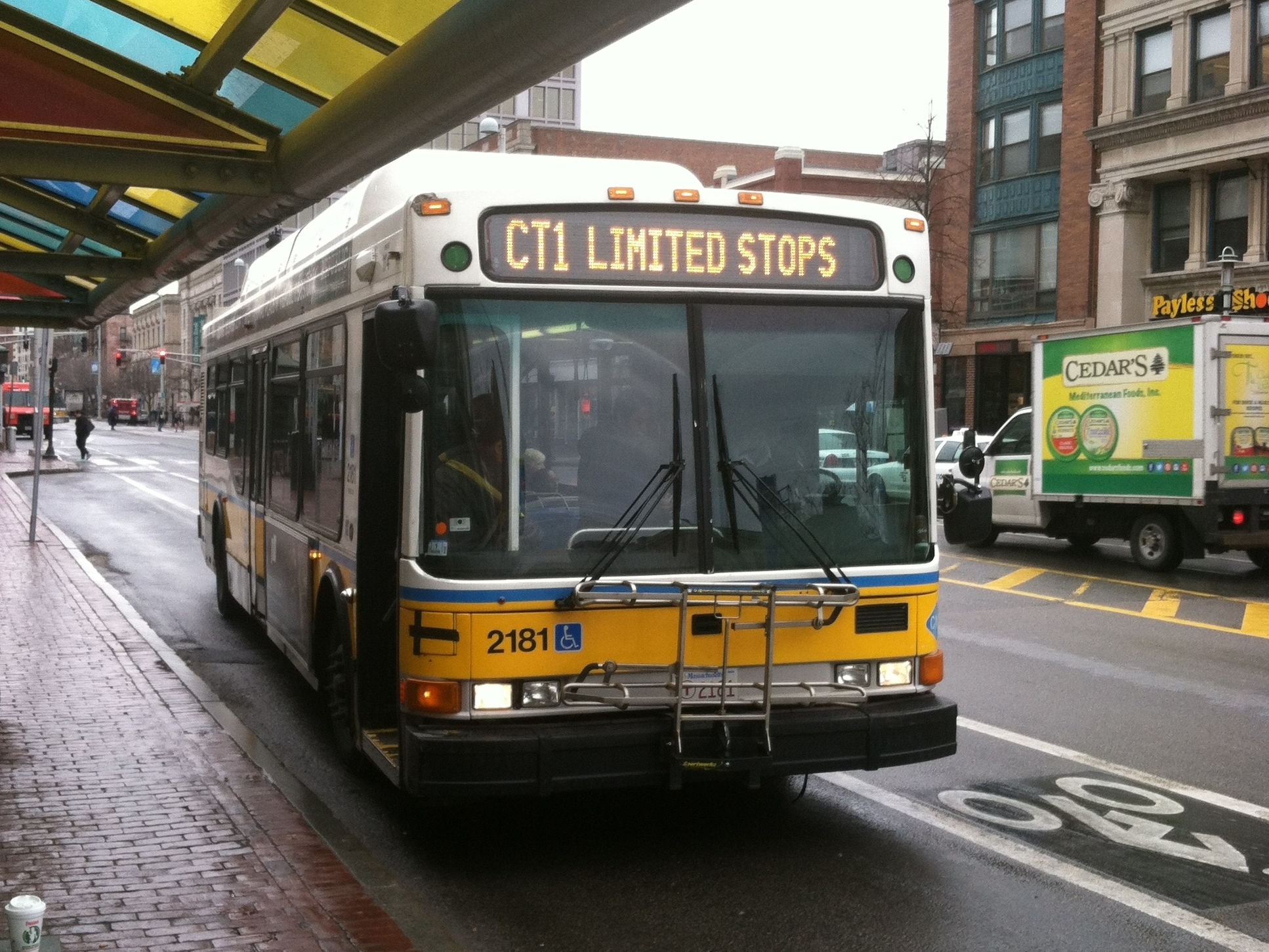
A route CT1 bus in Cambridge in 2015

On May 2, 1987, a number of MBTA bus routes were modified as the Orange Line was relocated from the Washington Street Elevated to the Southwest Corridor. Route 1 was rerouted via Albany Street and Melnea Cass Boulevard to serve Boston City Hospital. (Note: Boston City Hospital merged into Boston Medical Center in 1996.) By 1988, route 1 was the busiest MBTA bus route, averaging 15,861 weekday riders. On September 26, 1994, the MBTA began three crosstown bus routes intended as a precursor to the Urban Ring. Route CT1 operated between Boston City Hospital and Central Square via Massachusetts Avenue. Except for a loop around the hospital, it used the same routing as part of route 1, albeit with limited stops.

=== 21st century ===
On September 7, 2001, the MBTA added late-night service on Friday and Saturday nights. A set of bus routes following the subway network, plus seven regular routes including route 1, were operated until 2:30 am. The late-night service was discontinued on June 25, 2005, due to budget cuts. In 2004–2005, the MBTA designated a set of 15 high-ridership routes, including route 1, as "key bus routes" to be prioritized for service improvements. The first round of adjustments, made in 2006–07, did not include significant changes to route 1. By 2007, route 1 was the third-busiest MBTA bus route, averaging 12,758 daily boardings. It was a frequent source of passenger complaints due to bunching.

A second round of changes to the key routes were funded by the American Recovery and Reinvestment Act of 2009. Preliminary recommendations for route 1 released in 2011 included wider stop spacing, lengthening of stops to allow buses to pull fully to the curb, and additional amenities at stops. The 69 existing stops (36 southbound / 33 northbound) were to be reduced to 54 (28 southbound / 26 northbound). Construction of the changes took place in 2013. Beginning March 28, 2014, the MBTA again added late-night service on Friday and Saturday nights. This consisted of service until 2:30 am on the subway system and the key bus routes. The late-night service was cut back to 2:00 am in June 2015 and eliminated on March 18, 2016.

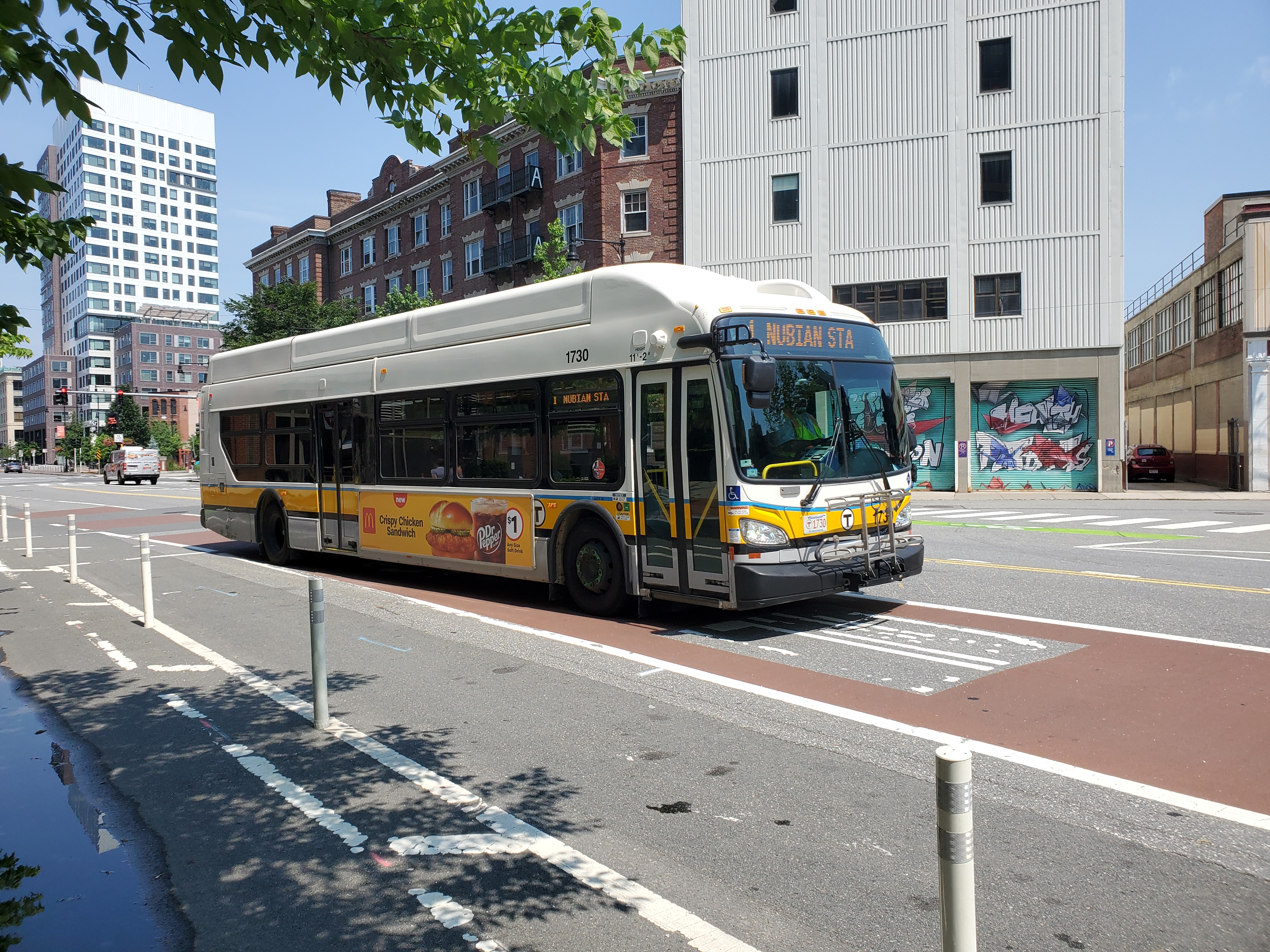
Route 1 bus on the 2018-installed bus lane in Cambridge

In May and June 2017, the intersection of Massachusetts Avenue and Brookline Avenue in Cambridge was one of six intersections systemwide where the MBTA tested transit signal priority (TSP). The pilot was deemed successful; TSP was installed on other portions of route 1 in Cambridge in 2018. Several segments of bus lanes for the route have also been installed. A southbound lane from Sidney Street to Albany Street and Vassar Street to Memorial Drive was installed in November 2018. The gap between Albany Street and Vassar Street was filled in November 2021, along with a slight extension northwest to Douglass Street. Two blocks of eastbound bus/bike lane were added to Mount Auburn Street in 2020. In November 2022, MassDOT added sections of bus lanes to the ends of the Harvard Bridge as part of a road diet.

A 2018–19 MBTA review of its bus system found that route 1 had issues with service quality. Overall reliability was 71% on weekdays and lower on weekends. More than 20% of passenger time on weekends was in crowded conditions – the highest rate on the bus system. It found that route CT1 had poor reliability; it had limited frequency and was not coordinated with route 1, leading to the routes being duplicative rather than complementary. The review recommended that route CT1 be discontinued in favor of increased service on route 1 in order to provide more consistent service across the corridor. It also recommended that the loop at Harvard Square be shortened, with buses routed via Dunster Street and Mount Auburn Street.

The MBTA board approved the changes in May 2019. The two routes were merged on September 1, 2019, resulting in increased frequency on route 1. The Harvard Square loop was changed on March 15, 2020. Most MBTA bus routes, including route 1, were placed on a Saturday schedule effective March 17, 2020, due to the COVID-19 pandemic. Regular service levels on a number of routes, including route 1, resumed on June 21, 2020.

In May 2022, the MBTA released a draft plan for a systemwide network redesign. The draft called for the 1 to keep its existing route. Frequency would be increased at night to be every 15 minutes or less at all service hours. A revised proposal in November 2022 called for the same change. Service changes effective August 24, 2025, implemented the increased frequency. Service also began operating about one hour longer on Friday and Saturday evenings. A 2024 report by advocacy group TransitMatters rated the 1 bus the slowest and most-bunched MBTA bus route in 2023, with an average speed of 6.55 miles per hour (10.54 km/h) and 17.7% of buses bunched. Average speed for the route fell to 6.02 miles per hour (9.69 km/h) in 2024; it increased slightly to 6.20 miles per hour (9.98 km/h) in 2025. In 2024 and 2026, the Cambridge City Council pushed the MBTA to make the route fare-free.
