= Massachusetts Avenue (metropolitan Boston) =

Major road in Greater Boston

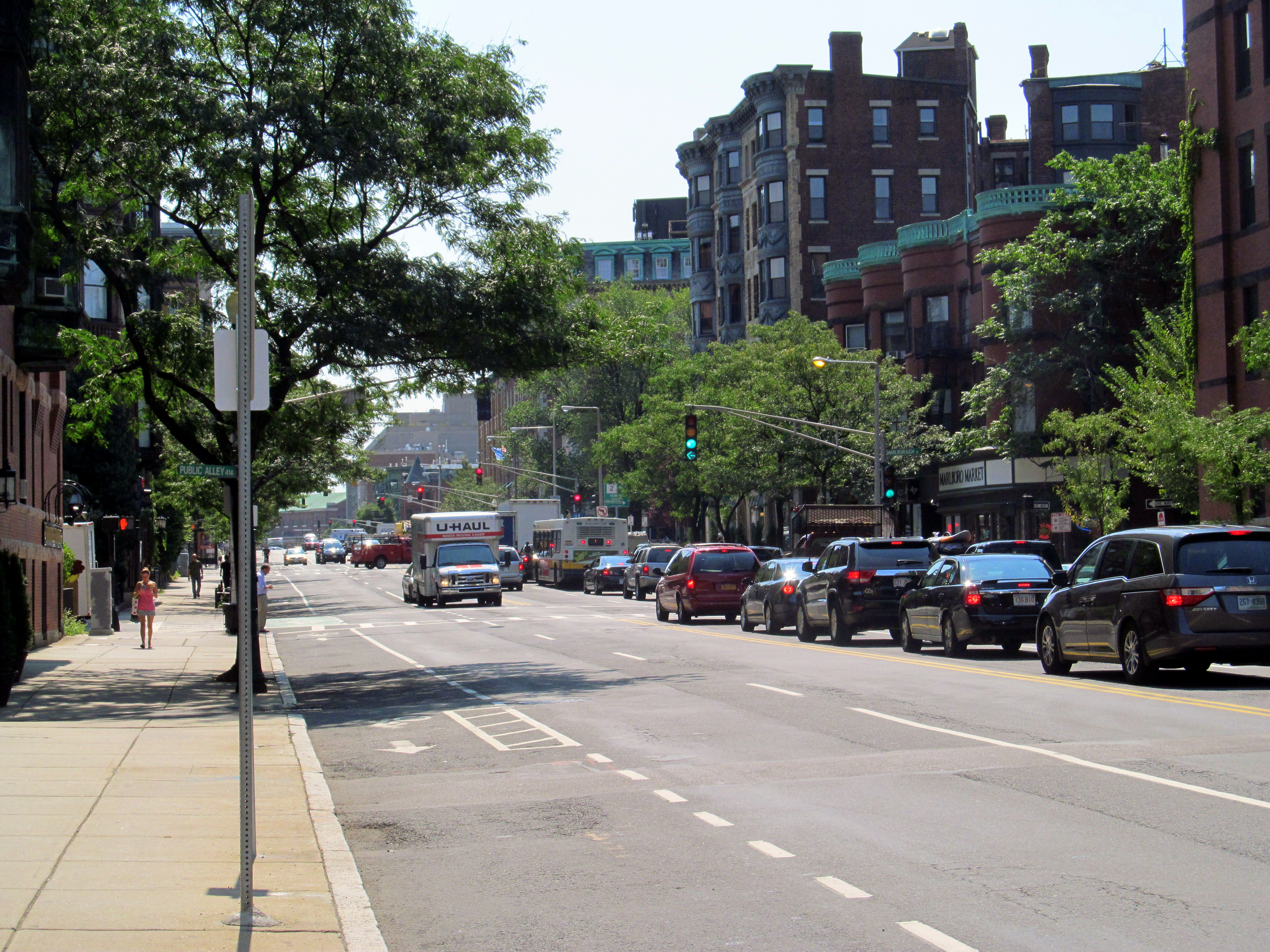
- Massachusetts Avenue near Beacon Street in Boston
- West end: Route 2A near Lexington
- Major junctions: Route 4 Bedford St. Route 2A Marrett Rd. Route 2A Maple St. Route 4 Pleasant St. US 3 / Route 60 Mystic St. US 3 Alewife Brook Pkwy; I-90 Mass. Tpke. Route 9 Huntington Ave.
- East end: Columbia Rd. In Boston

Massachusetts Avenue (colloquially referred to as Mass Ave) is a major thoroughfare in Boston, Massachusetts, and several cities and towns in the northwest suburbs of Greater Boston. According to Boston magazine, "Its 16 miles of blacktop run from gritty industrial zones to verdant suburbia, homeless encampments, passing gentrified brownstones, college campuses and bustling commercial strips."

== Route ==
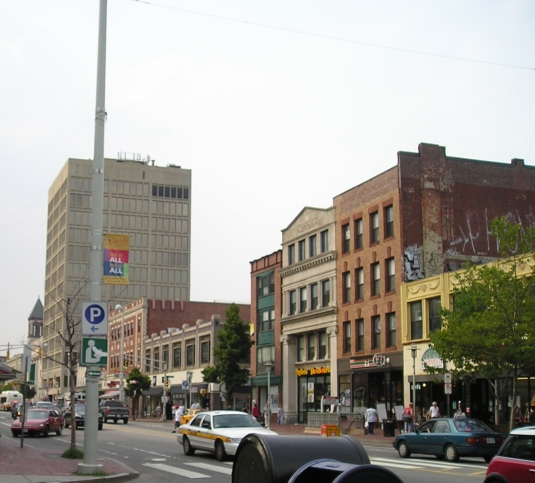
Massachusetts Avenue forms the commercial heart of Cambridge's Central Square.

The street begins at Everett Square in the Boston neighborhood of Dorchester and runs southeast–northwest through Boston, paralleling Interstate 93 for a short distance. Massachusetts Avenue passes below part of the Boston Medical Center complex near Harrison Street, before passing above routes 9, 2, and the Massachusetts Turnpike (Interstate 90). It crosses the Charles River from the Back Bay neighborhood of Boston into the city of Cambridge via the Harvard Bridge, where it passes both U.S. Route 3 and MA-Route 3, it then bisects the campus of the Massachusetts Institute of Technology, passes through Central Square, and curves around two sides of Harvard Yard at Harvard Square. After Harvard Square it turns sharply northward, passes Harvard Law School, then passes through Porter Square, where it bears northwestward. It continues through North Cambridge, Arlington, and Lexington, where it enters Minuteman National Historical Park.

A number of linear parks cut across various portions of Mass. Ave., including the Southwest Corridor Park, the Commonwealth Avenue portion of the Emerald Necklace, the Charles River Bike Path, the Cambridge Linear Park, Alewife Brook Reservation, and the Minuteman Bikeway.

=== Extended route ===
The road, by the same name, continues northwest and west, through many different cities and towns. It largely parallels or joins Route 2 and Route 2A, all the way into central Massachusetts, with a few gaps at towns that have different names for the central road.

For much of its length, Massachusetts Avenue is a center of commercial activity, especially through the larger towns. Apartments, shops, and restaurants fill both sides of it, and there is a lot of pedestrian traffic.

Map of the extended Massachusetts Avenue route through the Boston area

=== Towns and cities on the Massachusetts Avenue route ===
- Boston
- Cambridge
- Arlington
- Lexington
- Concord (signed as North Great Road from Hanscom Field to the town bypass; route through town unclear; resumes on the Concord Turnpike west of town)
- Acton
- Boxborough
- Harvard
- Lunenburg signs Route 2A as Mass Ave, but there is no defined route through Shirley or Ayer.

=== Notable buildings, institutions, and landmarks along the route ===
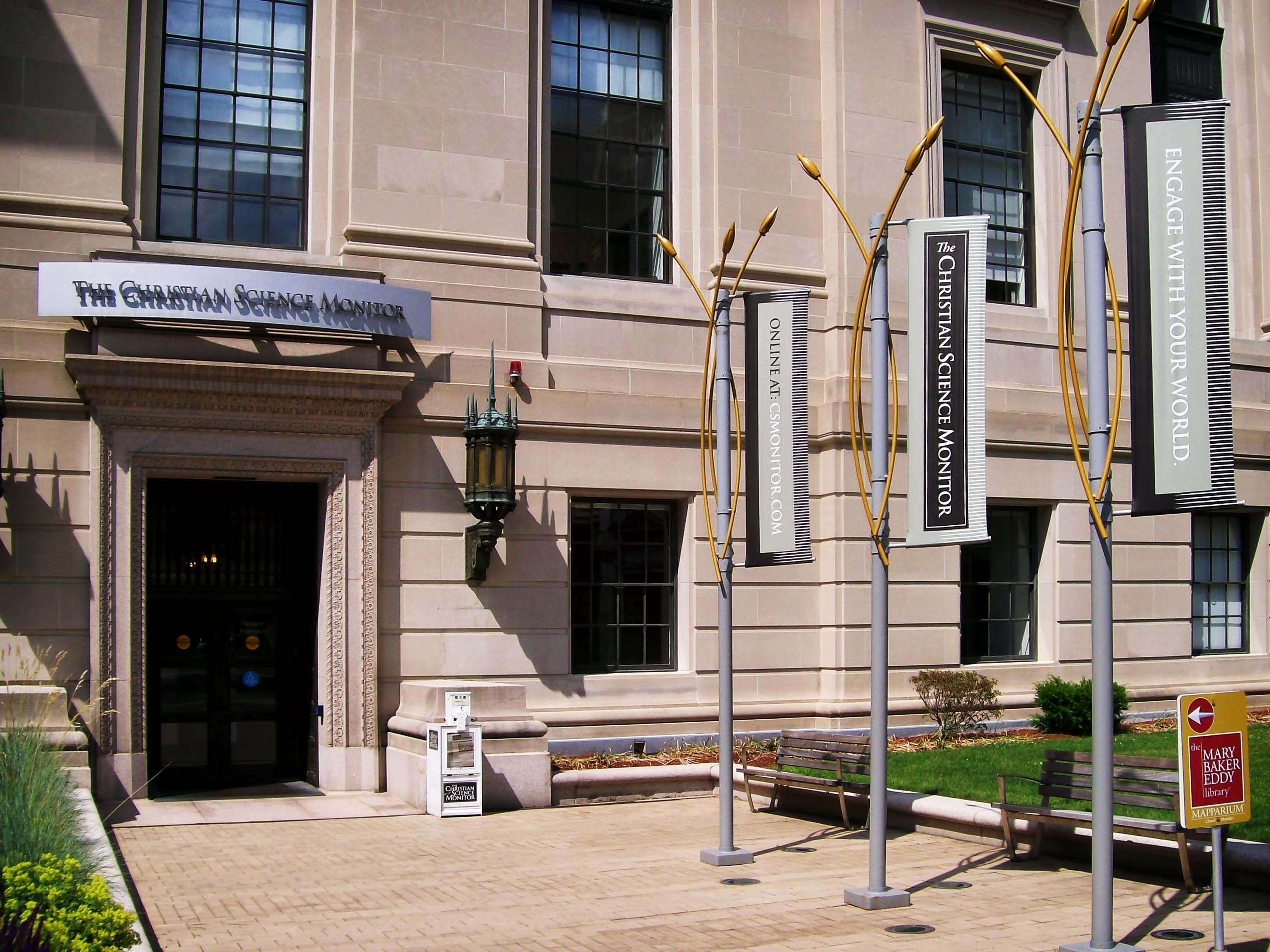
The global headquarters of The Christian Science Monitor on Massachusetts Avenue

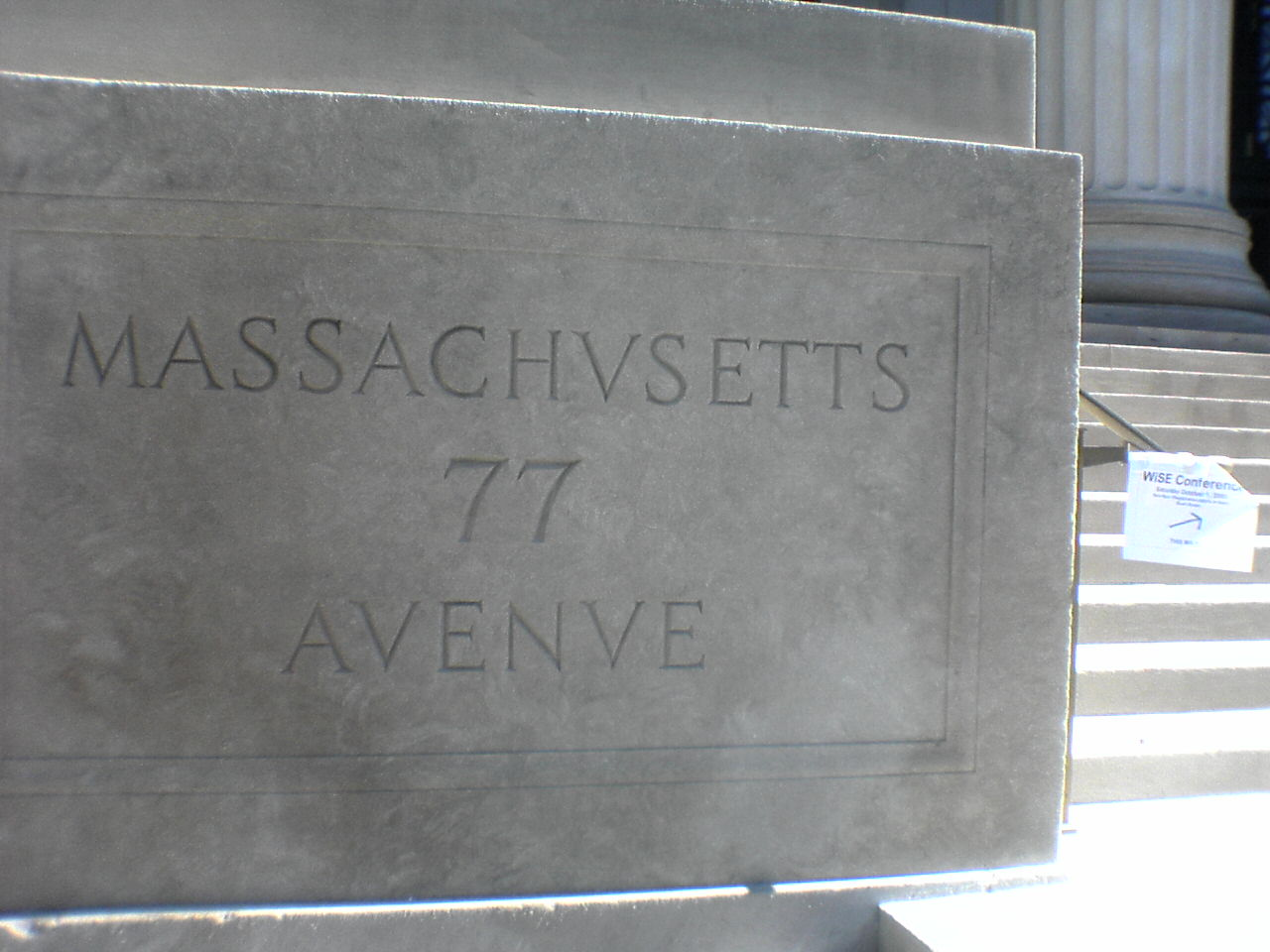
77 Massachusetts Avenue, the site of MIT, an important landmark in Cambridge

- Mass and Cass
- Chester Square
- Matthews Arena, world's oldest functioning indoor sports venue
- Northeastern University
- Symphony Hall (Boston Symphony Orchestra)
- Horticultural Hall
- The Mary Baker Eddy Library and its Mapparium
- The First Church of Christ, Scientist at the Christian Science Center
- Berklee College of Music
- Newbury Street
- Charles River
- Massachusetts Institute of Technology
- Central Square
- Cambridge City Hall
- Harvard University
- Harvard Square
- Cambridge Common
- Lesley University
- Porter Square
- Watson's Corner
- Uncle Sam Memorial Statue
- Arlington Town Hall
- Jason Russell House
- Munroe Tavern
- Lexington Battle Green

== History ==
=== Paul Revere's ride ===
On the night of April 18–19, 1775, Paul Revere rode his horse down a portion of this road, then known as the Great Road, on his "Midnight Ride", and William Dawes and Samuel Prescott also rode on portions of this road on their way to Concord. These travels were on the Cambridge side of the Charles River; the Harvard Bridge was not constructed until the 1880s.

=== Early names and evolution ===
Massachusetts Avenue was formed at the end of the nineteenth century from what were separate roads. In Boston the road was previously called East Chester Park south of Chester Square and West Chester Park to the north (Chester Square is in the South End and is now called Chester Park). Across the river in Cambridge the road follows part of what was once Front Street near the Massachusetts Institute of Technology and then follows the former Main Street to Harvard Square (Main Street originally ran between Kendall and Harvard Squares, and the part to the east of Central Square retains the original name). From Harvard Square to the Arlington line at Alewife Brook it follows what had been North Avenue since 1838, and prior to that the Road to Menotomy. In Arlington it follows the former Arlington Avenue, and in Lexington it follows the former Main Street south of the Battle Green and the former Monument Street north of the Battle Green.

== Mass transit ==
Massachusetts Avenue is served with direct connections for a number of the MBTA's bus and subway routes between Lexington and Boston.

Direct bus connections on Massachusetts Avenue include 1, 8, 10, 16, 17, 39, 43, 47, 55, 62, 64, 66, 67, 68, 69, 70, 71, 72, 73, 74, 75, 76, 77, 78, 83, 85, 86, 91, 96, 350, CT3, a stop on the Silver Line bus, and LexPress.

MBTA subway stations, from west to east, include Porter, Harvard, and Central along the Red Line; both the Hynes Convention Center and Symphony along the Green Line; and a station along the Orange Line under the Mass Ave. name. An additional stop at Arlington Center was mooted during the 1980s Red Line extension but ultimately was not constructed.

Two MBTA Commuter Rail stations are located on Massachusetts Avenue: Porter in Cambridge and Newmarket at the South Bay Shopping Center in Dorchester.

== See also ==
- Fenway Theatre (1915–1972)
