= Southwest Corridor Park =

Park in Boston, Massachusetts, United States

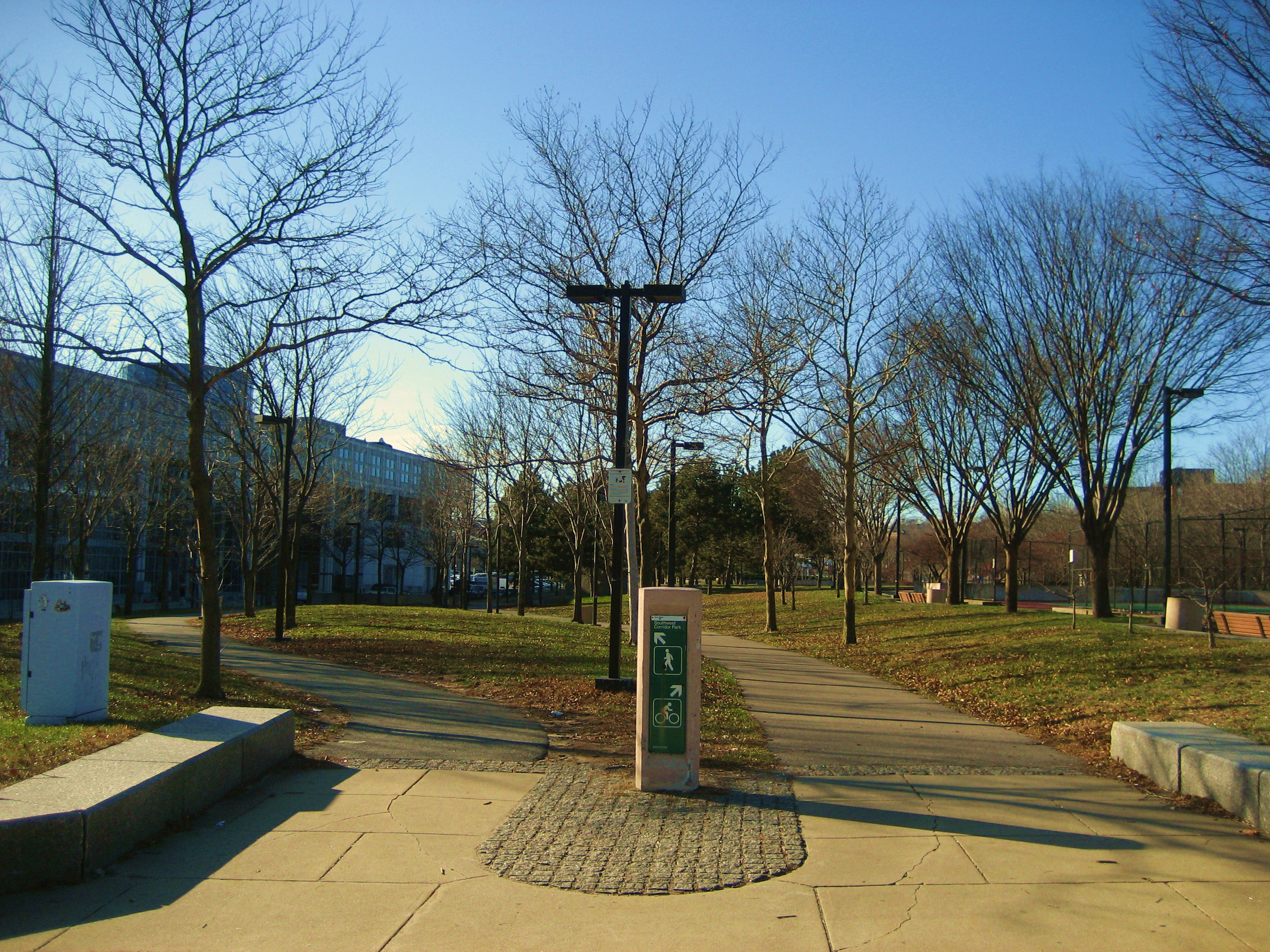
- Southwest Corridor Park as seen from Ruggles Street looking south.

- Location within Massachusetts Location within the United States
- Location: Suffolk County, Massachusetts, United States
- Coordinates: 42°19′25″N 71°05′57″W
- Area: 221 acres (89 ha)
- Established: 1987
- Administrator: Massachusetts Department of Conservation and Recreation
- Website: Official website

Southwest Corridor Park is a 4.1-mile-long (6.6 km) linear urban park in Boston, Massachusetts, part of the Metropolitan Park System of Greater Boston and managed by the Massachusetts Department of Conservation and Recreation. It extends from the South End and Back Bay neighborhoods through Northeastern University's campus to the Forest Hills section of Jamaica Plain in what was originally planned to be the alignment for Interstate 95 to Boston. It follows the routes of regional Amtrak and Commuter Rail lines and the Massachusetts Bay Transportation Authority Orange Line rapid transit rail line, from its Back Bay Station to its terminus at the Forest Hills Station. It features tennis courts, basketball courts, playgrounds, and walking, jogging, and biking paths.

== History ==
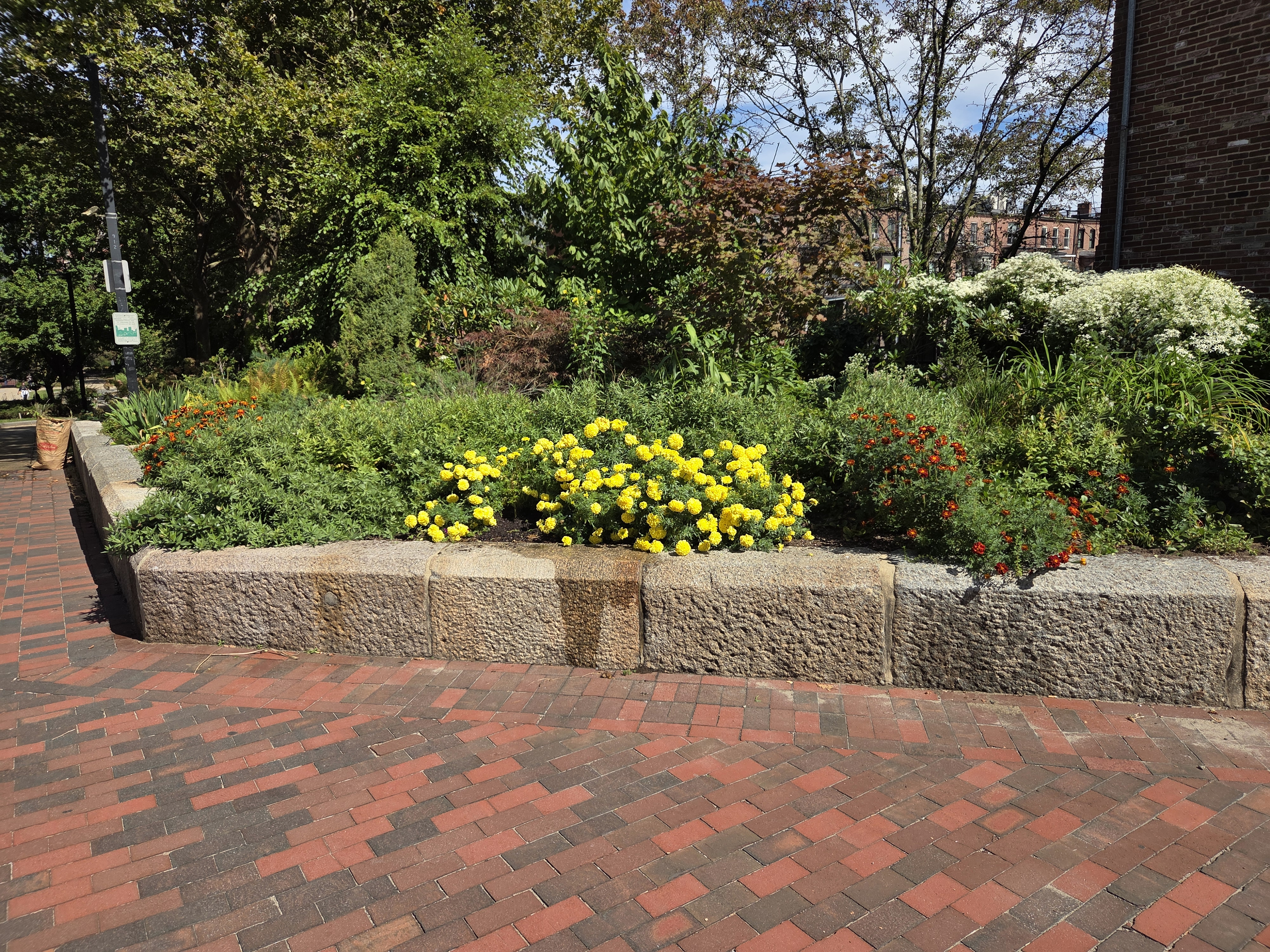
A flowerbed in the park made from stones from the old railroad embankment

Starting in the 1960s, thousands of homes in South End, Roxbury, and Jamaica Plain were razed along what became known as the Southwest Corridor to build a 4.6 mile (7.4 km) section of Interstate 95 to be called the Southwest Expressway into downtown Boston. This mass demolition sparked massive community protest, which was marked by the painting of "STOP I-95 — PEOPLE BEFORE HIGHWAYS" on a local train-track wall, as a harbinger of the Southwest Corridor's future rail transit and community park use.

The protest prompted Governor Francis W. Sargent to cancel the highway project in 1969 and advocate for changes to federal laws so states could redirect highway funds to mass transit projects such as subways and light rail. I-95 was then routed along the existing Massachusetts Route 128 corridor in the suburbs. In 1973, Congress approved the Interstate Transfer Option, which allowed states to transfer federal funding from highways to mass transit projects.

Construction for the park was then done in conjunction with the project to reroute the MBTA Orange Line down the existing rail right-of-way which the planned highway was to follow. Since land acquisition and demolition of structures had already taken place along the route's path prior to the cancellation of the highway project, the Southwest Corridor remained a "terrible urban scar" for nearly ten years. However, local residents began to grow community gardens on the land, which gradually multiplied and ultimately led to the commencement of park construction in 1978. The park's first segments opened in 1987, and the remainder spanning Northeastern's campus and Back Bay opened shortly thereafter. A ribbon-cutting ceremony for the completed Southwest Corridor Park took place on May 5, 1990.

== Description ==
The Southwest Corridor Park is 4.7 miles (7.6 km) in length and occupies 52 acres (21 ha) of land alongside the right of way of the Massachusetts Bay Transportation Authority's Orange Line and Commuter Rail lines and Amtrak's Northeast Corridor from Back Bay Station to Forest Hills Station. It extends from the South End and Back Bay neighborhoods through Northeastern University's campus to the Forest Hills section of Jamaica Plain. Along its route are tennis courts, playgrounds, basketball courts, and walking, jogging, and biking trails which also connect to Boston's Emerald Necklace at the Arborway in Forest Hills.

MBTA Orange Line station	Mileage from Back Bay Station
Back Bay / South End	0.0 miles (0 km)
Massachusetts Ave.	0.5 miles (0.80 km)
Ruggles	1.1 miles (1.8 km)
Roxbury Crossing	1.6 miles (2.6 km)
Jackson Square	2.2 miles (3.5 km)
Stony Brook	2.7 miles (4.3 km)
Green St.	3.2 miles (5.1 km)
Forest Hills	3.9 miles (6.3 km)
