= Anna Harris Smith =

American animal welfare activist

Anna Clapp Harris Smith
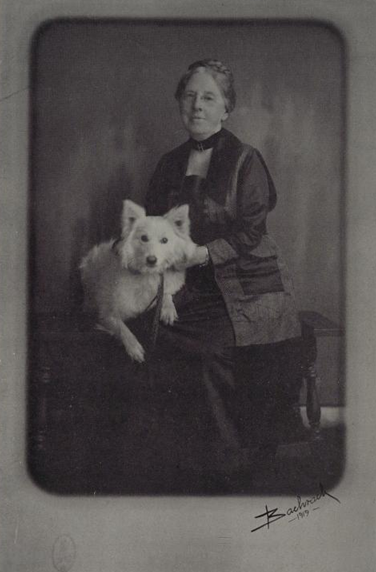
- Anna Harris Smith, founder of the Animal Rescue League of Boston
- Born: Ann Sarah Smith; July 23, 1843; Dorchester, Boston, U.S.
- Died: January 4, 1929 (aged 85)
- Spouse: Huntington Smith (m. 1884)
- Parents: William Harris (father); Ann Larkin Clapp (mother)
- Family: Clapp family

Anna Clapp Harris Smith, née Ann Sarah Smith, (1843–1929) was an American animal welfare activist. She is known for founding the Animal Rescue League of Boston in 1899.

Her league offered shelter to stray animals and care to beasts of burden. Anna Harris Smith improved the living conditions of animals by creating amenities for them, as well as the Horses Aid Association and the Pine Ridge Home of Rest for Horses. She also started the magazine Our Four-Footed Friends, which is still active nowadays and shares the Animal Rescue League's actions.

Anna Harris Smith also had to face a post-rabies pandemic context in which stray animals, especially dogs, were perceived as a threat to public health. As people sought to control the population of stray animals and the disease, Anna Harris Smith and her husband created the "Automatic Electric Cage" which aimed at killing them humanly and efficiently.

In 2020, the song "A Walk in Her Shoes" was composed for the Boston Landmarks Orchestra in honor to Anna Harris Smith.

== Early life ==
Smith was born in Dorchester, Massachusetts, on July 23, 1843. Surrounded by her grandfather, her mother Ann Larkin Clapp, and her father, William Harris; Anna H. Smith grew up as a fervent Christian in Dorchester. She studied in public schools and at the New England Conservatory. She also followed private classes of French and music.

Smith was a music teacher before starting her journalism career in her forties. In 1884, she married her husband, William Huntington Smith, a literary translator and newspaper editor. From 1889 to 1899, she worked for the Boston Beacon as an assistant editor and joined the New England Woman Press Association in April 1890 to represent the newspaper.

== Activism ==
=== Rabies pandemic and scientific context ===
The 19th and 20th centuries were marked by a rabies pandemic. Before the development of the vaccine in the 1880s, the disease instilled a sentiment of fear within human relations with animals. At a time when the number of pets was increasing in American cities, this health issue led dogs to become the main target of human hate and cruelty.

In 1914, the New York City health commissioner Sigismund S. Goldwater criticised the presence of stray dogs in the city, arguing that they endangered public health: "they are a nuisance from the point of view of sanitation, and there is always the danger of rabies."

However, the newspaper Spirit of the Times denounced, in July 1874, a "crusade" against "the entire canine species," and compared this violence towards dogs to a "persecution as ignorant and wantonly cruel as that of the witches of New England, or the Jews of the Middle Ages."

Stray animals were also considered as "superfluous animal life", and killing them was seen as more humane than leaving them in the streets, exposed to starvation and disease.

Following the idea of considering animals with humanity, Anna Harris Smith's husband, Huntington Smith, invented and patented in 1911 the "Automatic Electric Cage." The cage was then adopted in shelters from all around the United States.

As many animals that were taken into shelters had to be killed because of sanitary conditions or financial reasons, this invention became a humane and effective alternative to the criticised methods used by municipal authorities and agents of anti-cruelty societies (such as drowning, shooting, gassing, poisoning with cyanide).

=== Animal Rescue League of Boston ===
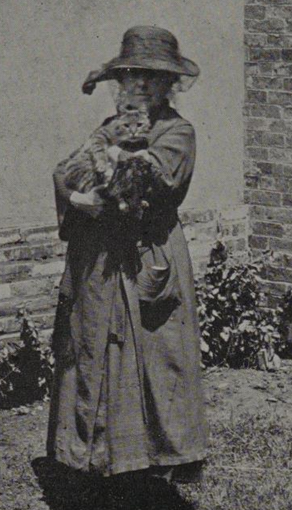
Anna Harris Smith holding a cat

In 1899, Smith founded the Animal Rescue League of Boston, a rescue and adoption shelter for stray cats and dogs. Her goal was to improve the living conditions of animals and to reduce their suffering, which she witnessed in the mistreatment of working horses and the amount of stray animals in the streets of Boston. She devoted herself to the cause and used her wealth to implement amenities, like water bassins for cats and dogs. She also created the Horses Aid Association in order to give health care to horses.

The first meeting of the Animal Rescue League of Boston took place in the Park Street Church on February 7, 1899 which was attended by over a hundred persons. This was the first step towards the creation of the league on March 13, 1899. The league later expanded to receive other animals and include the working animals that were famished and ignored. In 1910, the league offered a home to 25 784 animals, including cats, dogs, mice, birds and rats.

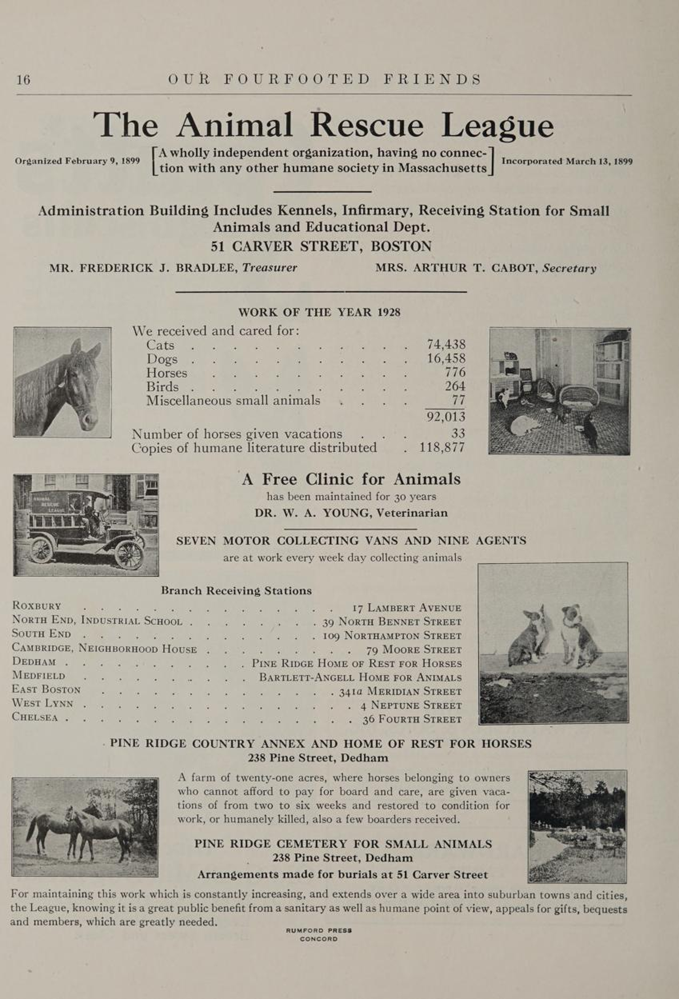
Last page from Our Four-Footed Friends, (Vol. 27 No. 10) January 1929

Smith also inaugurated the Pine Ridge Home of Rest for Horses (Pine Ridge Pet Cemetery) in 1907, established from a ten-acre farm in Dedham, Massachusetts. It is the oldest pet cemetery operated by an animal welfare organization in the United States.

Moreover, in 1913, the league started an annual tradition, Christmas Dinner for Horses. Members would offer "a meal of oats, carrots and apples to working horses of Boston". This lasted until the 21st century.

She also created the Our Four-Footed Friends magazine in April 1902. Now a bi-annual magazine, Our Four-Footed Friends shares the ARL's latest works.

Her motto, "Kindness Uplifts the Wold", was and is still the core of the league.

Today, the ARL is still active in various locations across the country and act as a non-profit organization, helping stray animals in need.

== Legacy and influence ==
=== Anna Clapp Harris Smith House ===
The house of the late Clapp family, located at 65 Pleasant Street in Dorchester, is considered significant to the city of Boston. It was constructed by Samuel Clapp, Anna Harris Smith's maternal grandfather. She lived there from her birth to the age of 65.

Her house was voted worthy of becoming a Boston landmark in 2007.

=== Anna Harris Smith Day ===
March 13 is celebrated by the Animal Rescue League of Boston as the Anna Harris Smith Day. Their goal is to remember the day their organization was created and to honor its founder.

=== Musical composition ===
In 2020, Francine Trester, a college professor of composition and composer, wrote "A Walk in Her Shoes", five poems turned to music, for the Boston Landmarks Orchestra. This musical composition honors Anna H. Smith and four other Dorchester women.

== See also ==
- South End, Boston
