= Pine Ridge Pet Cemetery =

Site in Norfolk County, Massachusetts

Coordinates: 42°15′51″N 71°11′03″W

Pine Ridge Pet Cemetery is a pet cemetery located in Dedham, Massachusetts. Opened in 1907 and operated by the Animal Rescue League of Boston, it is full with nearly 17,000 animals, including dogs, cats, horses, birds, lizards, and rabbits buried there.

It is the oldest pet cemetery run by an animal welfare organization in the United States. It holds the remains of a number of notable animals, as well as the pets of a number of notable people.

Stone walls covered in vines mark the oldest part of the cemetery, which includes a gazebo.

== History ==
The Animal Rescue League of Boston was founded by Anna Harris Smith in 1899. She bought a tract of land in the Riverdale section of town to be a place where the working horses of Boston could rest or, if needed, be euthanized. Smith built an electrified stall on the property, which she called "the House of the Blessed Release," that would kill the horse whenever it happened to wander into it.

If a horse could be saved, it was given a few weeks of rest and then returned to its owner along with a warning to take better care of the animal. In addition to horses, which were the main focus of the facility, kennels for dogs and cats were also built. As motors took the place of horses, the facility eventually changed its focus to cats and dogs instead.

The cemetery was built adjacent to the animal refuge.

=== Visitors ===
The facility instituted a visitors' day every year beginning in 1908. Guests took a tour of the property while being pulled in a wicker carriage. Pulling the carriage was Beppo, a donkey that formerly worked at a park in Lexington that had closed.

Students from the nearby Riverdale School were often invited to the facility, which included a visit to the bungalow Smith and her husband lived in. They would then feed the horses apples and sugar before being treated to ice cream and a sing-a-long. At the school itself, a "bird table" was set up with seeds, crumbs, and suet to feed the birds.

=== Martha Moore's cat ===
After Martha Moore's cat, Freddie, died in 1918, she visited the grave every Saturday for the remaining 28 years of her life. The widow, whose husband died in 1880, lived at the Hotel Bellevue on Beacon Hill, Boston. She took the trolley to Dedham each week no matter the weather, walking the final mile to the cemetery. In her final years, as she approached 90 years old, the walk became more difficult and she would sometimes take a taxi.

She kept a pail and a brush in the caretaker's barn and scrubbed the headstone at every visit. In her will, she left $200 to the cemetery so that the practice would continue. Not knowing about the bequest, but knowing of Moore's devotion to her cat's final resting place, the staff had decided long before she died to continue the practice of scrubbing the headstone.

She also asked for her remains to be cremated and placed next to the cat. The cemetery refused the request, however, and she was buried at Mt. Auburn Cemetery instead.

== Notable burials ==
- George Arliss' two dogs
- Lizzie Borden’s three Boston Terriers: Donald Stuart, Royal Nelson, and Laddie Miller
- Igloo, a Fox Terrier that accompanied Admiral Richard E. Byrd to both the north and south poles. Marking the grave is a stone in the shape of an iceberg with Igloo's name and "He was more than a friend" inscribed upon it. (Note: A statue of Byrd and Igloo now stands in Wincherster, Virginia.)
- Serge Koussevitzky's pet
- R. H. White's Yorkshire Terrier, Jessie, has an elaborate mausoleum.

== Works cited ==
- Parr, James L. (2009). Dedham: Historic and Heroic Tales From Shiretown. The History Press. ISBN 978-1-59629-750-0.
