= South End, Boston =

Neighborhood in Boston, Massachusetts

- South End District
- U.S. National Register of Historic Places
- U.S. Historic district
- Boston Landmark
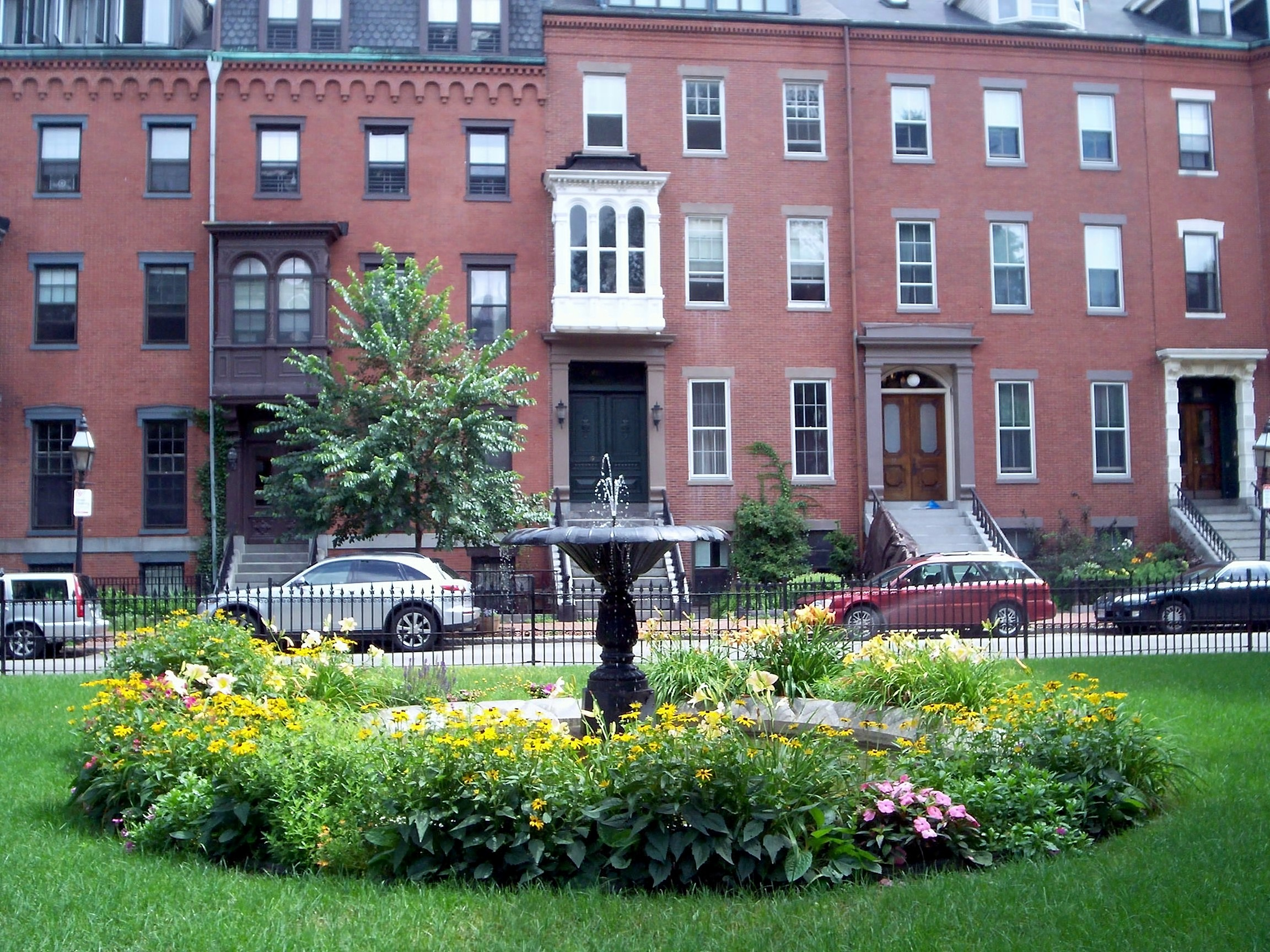
- Union Park

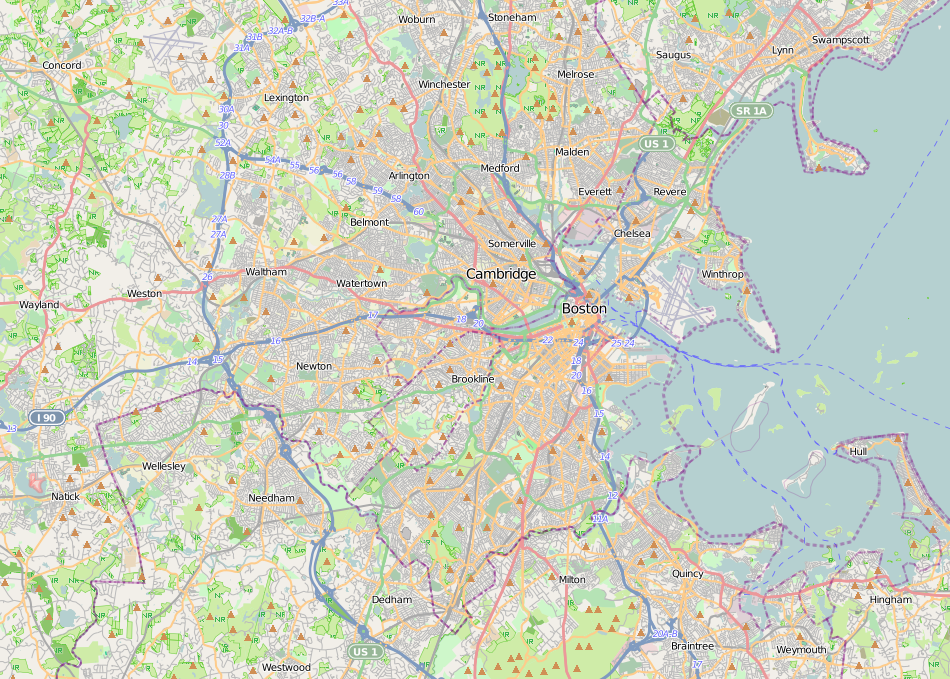
- Location within Boston Location within Greater Boston area Location within Massachusetts Location within the United States
- Location: Boston, Massachusetts
- Coordinates: 42°20′23″N 71°4′23″W
- Area: 238 acres (96 ha)
- Built: 1848
- Architect: Multiple
- Architectural style: Greek Revival, Late Victorian, Italianate
- Website: south-end-boston.com
- NRHP reference No.: 73000324 (original); 14001095 (increase 1); 100011759 (increase 2)

Significant dates
- Added to NRHP: May 8, 1973
- Boundary increases: December 29, 2014; April 17, 2025
- Designated BOSL: November 14, 1983

The South End is a neighborhood in Boston, Massachusetts, United States which is bordered by Back Bay, Chinatown, and Roxbury. It is distinguished from other neighborhoods by its Victorian-style houses and the parks in and around the area. The South End is the largest intact Victorian row-house district in the country, covering over 300 acres (120 ha). It has eleven residential parks. In 1973, the South End was listed on the National Register of Historic Places. Much of the neighborhood was originally marshlands in Boston's South Bay. After it was filled in, construction began on January 7, 1849.

It is home to diverse groups, including immigrants, young families and professionals, and it is popular with Boston's gay and lesbian community. The South End has been characterized by diversity since the 1880s, with substantial Irish, Jewish, African-American, Puerto Rican (in the San Juan Street area), Chinese, Italian, and Greek populations. Its 2010 population was 55.2 percent white, 13.3 percent Hispanic, 12.5 percent Black, 16.2 percent Asian, and 2.7 percent "other". 55.2 percent of South End residents had a bachelor's degree or higher; median household income was $57,699, and the median age was 36. 65.6 percent were primarily English speakers, and 12.9 percent primarily spoke Spanish.

== Geographic history ==
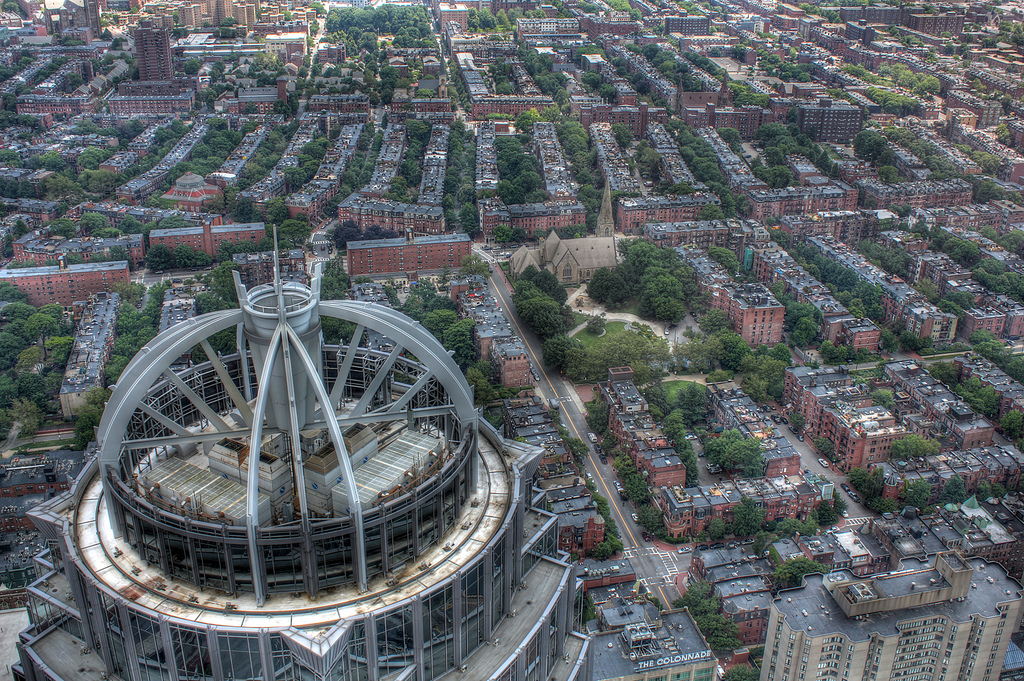
Aerial view of the South End

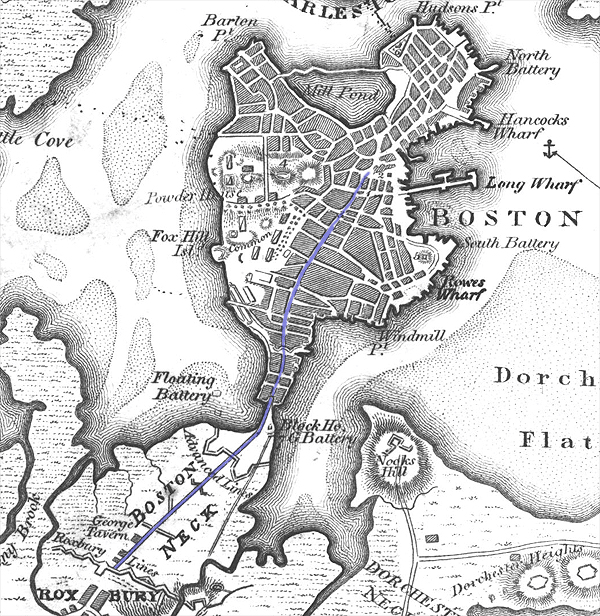
The Boston Neck carried present-day Washington Street, formerly flanked by tidal marshes.

The South End is south of the Back Bay, northwest of South Boston, northeast of Roxbury, north of Dorchester, and southwest of Bay Village. Despite the name, it is not directly south of downtown Boston.

Land belonging to the South End has been part of the city of Boston since its founding, although it was smaller when first settled and surrounded by large tidal flats. The neighborhood was expanded and developed by filling in the marshlands, part of a larger project of filling Boston's Back Bay and South Bay between the 1830s and the 1870s. Fill was brought in by train as gravel quarried in Needham. Nineteenth-century technology did not allow driving steel piles into bedrock, and a system of submerged timbers provided an understructure for most South End buildings. Groundwater levels in Boston had been dropping for years by 2006, damaging some wood pilings by exposing them to air. A series of monitoring wells have been drilled; the water level is checked by the Boston Groundwater Trust, and can be raised by introducing water.

The South End was bordered on the north and west by the Boston and Providence Railroad, which terminated at the B&PRR station bordering the Public Garden. The rail line is now covered by Southwest Corridor Park.

The primary business thoroughfares in the South End are Columbus Avenue, Tremont Street, and Washington Street. Washington Street, the original causeway that connected Roxbury to Boston, experienced reinvestment during the 1990s. The street was once defined by the Washington Street Elevated, an elevated train that was moved below Southwest Corridor Park in the 1980s. Part of the Silver Line, Boston's first bus rapid transit line, runs along Washington Street. The MBTA Orange Line rapid-transit train runs along the partially-covered Southwest Corridor.

=== Subdistricts ===
The Boston Redevelopment Authority identified several subdistricts in the neighborhood's southeast portion:

- SoWa (South of Washington), roughly between Albany to Washington and East Berkeley to Massachusetts Avenue
- New York Streets, between Herald, East Berkeley, Albany, and Tremont Streets
- Back Streets, roughly between I-93, Harrison, East Brookline, and East Berkeley Streets
- Medical area, roughly between the highway, Massachusetts Avenue, Franklin Square, and East Brookline Street

=== Historic district ===
Part of the neighborhood is on a National Register of Historic Places district, which is bounded roughly by the Southwest Corridor Park on the northwest, the Massachusetts Turnpike to the north, Herald Street to the east, Albany Street to the south east, and Massachusetts Avenue to the southwest. The area's principal development took place 1850–1873, and resulted in a neighborhood of what were originally single-family brick or brownstone rowhouses, interspersed with retail and civic buildings, as well as six small parks. After the Panic of 1873, these properties were for the most part converted to multi-unit housing.

The district was listed on the National Register of Historic Places in 1973. In 2014, it was expanded to include additional properties on the 200 block of Harrison Street, and it was further enlarged in 2025.

== Parks ==
The South End has eleven residential parks, varying in size and inspired by English-style residential squares first laid out downtown by Charles Bulfinch. The neighborhood also has newer parks, including Peters Park, and a series of sixteen community gardens and pocket parks operated by the Trustees of Reservations.

== History ==
=== Residential history ===
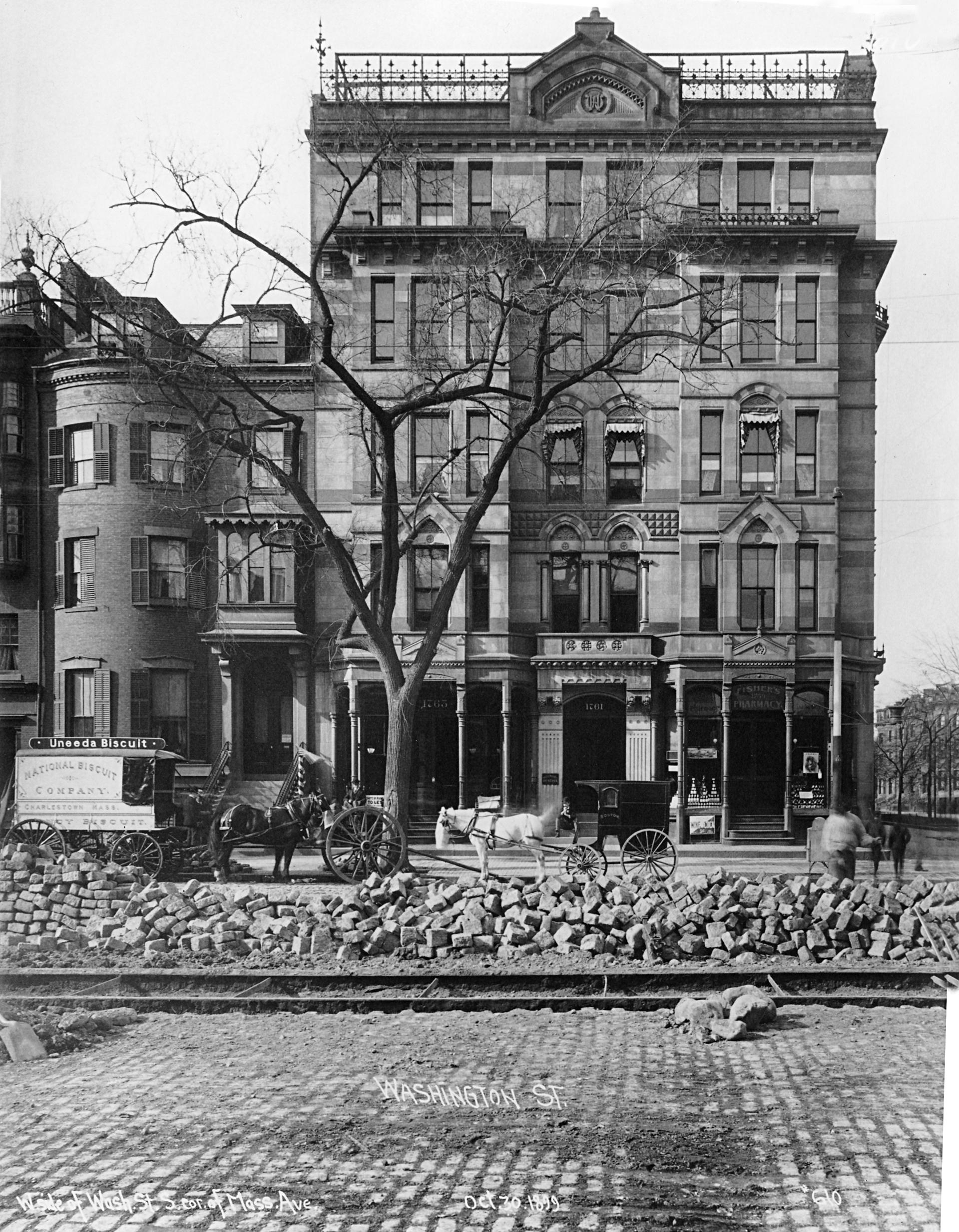
Hotel Alexandra in 1899

As the South End expanded with fill north and west of "the Neck", Boston envisioned a large inner-city residential neighborhood to relieve the crowded downtown and Beacon Hill neighborhoods and hoped for a large, stable tax base. Architect Charles Bulfinch laid out some of the first filled land. He designed a large residential park called Columbia Square located at the present Franklin and Blackstone Squares. Bulfinch's plan was to route traffic around the square. His plan was abandoned, and Washington Street was allowed to again divide the square (creating separate squares).

Many rooming houses on the Back Bay side of the South End had no bathing facilities, and roomers bathed in public showers. Filled land in the neighborhood was originally eight feet above sea level, but has settled to four feet. The original shoreline of Boston Neck crosses in front of 40 St. George Street, and tapers to the narrowest point of the Neck at East Berkeley St. (formerly Dover Street). Blackstone and Franklin Square is solid land on the original neck, but clam and snail shells are just beneath its surface because high seas would occasionally overrun the Neck.

Middle-class people moved to the South End, including business owners, two mayors, bankers, and industrialists, but the neighborhood's wealthy status was relatively short-lived. A series of national financial panics such as the Panic of 1884, combined with new residential housing in Back Bay and Roxbury, fed a steady decline of whites of English Protestant ancestry.

By the close of the nineteenth century, the South End was becoming a tenement district; it attracted immigrants and, during the 1940s, gay men. The neighborhood also became a center of Black middle-class Boston life and culture. The largest concentration of Pullman porters in the country lived in the South End, primarily between Columbus Avenue and the railroad.

The first settlement houses in Boston were in the South End: the South End House, Haley House, Lincoln House, the Harriet Tubman House, and the Children's Art Centre. In 1960, these settlement houses merged to form United South End Settlements.

=== Urban renewal ===
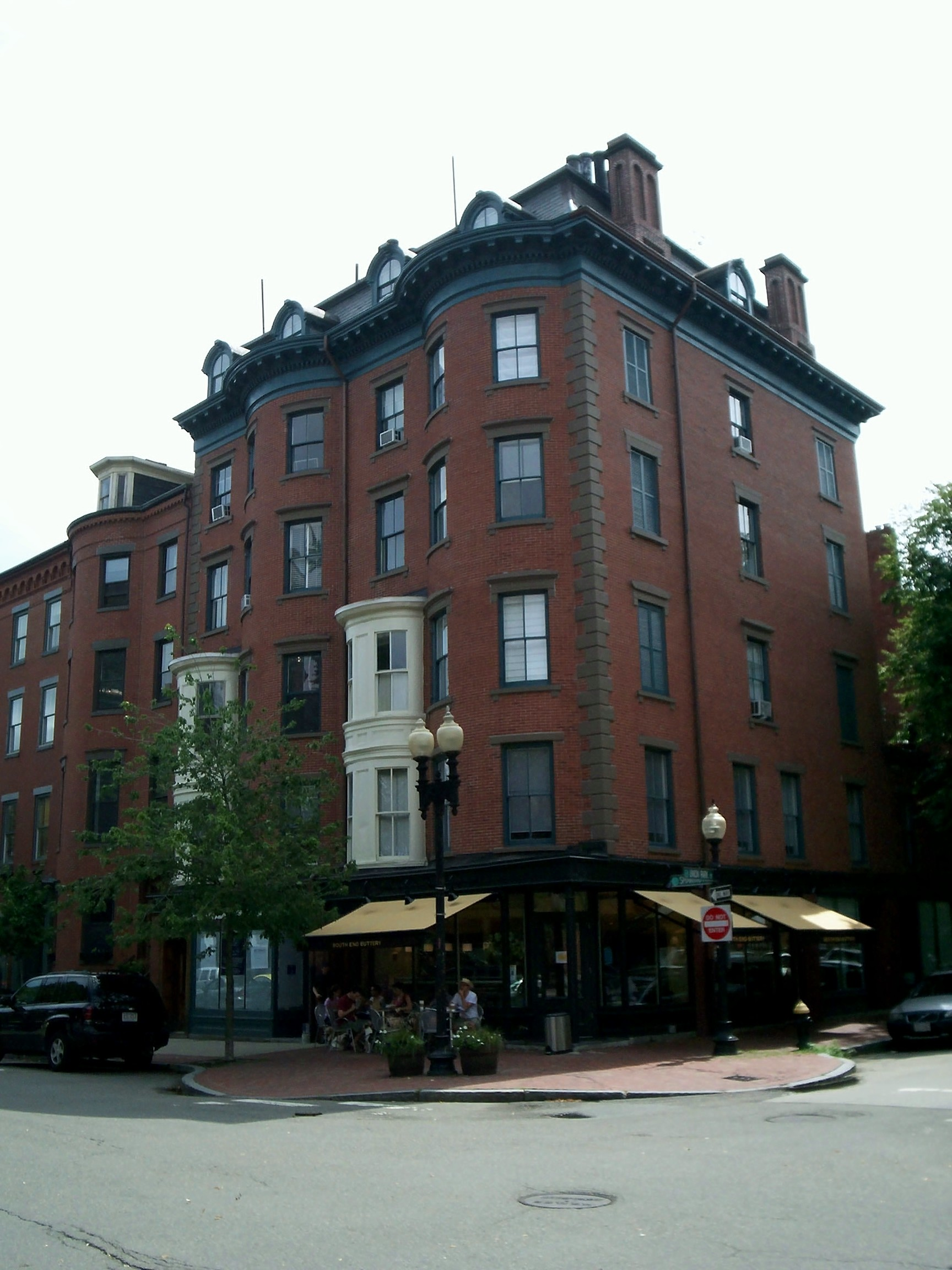
Union Park Street and Shawmut Avenue

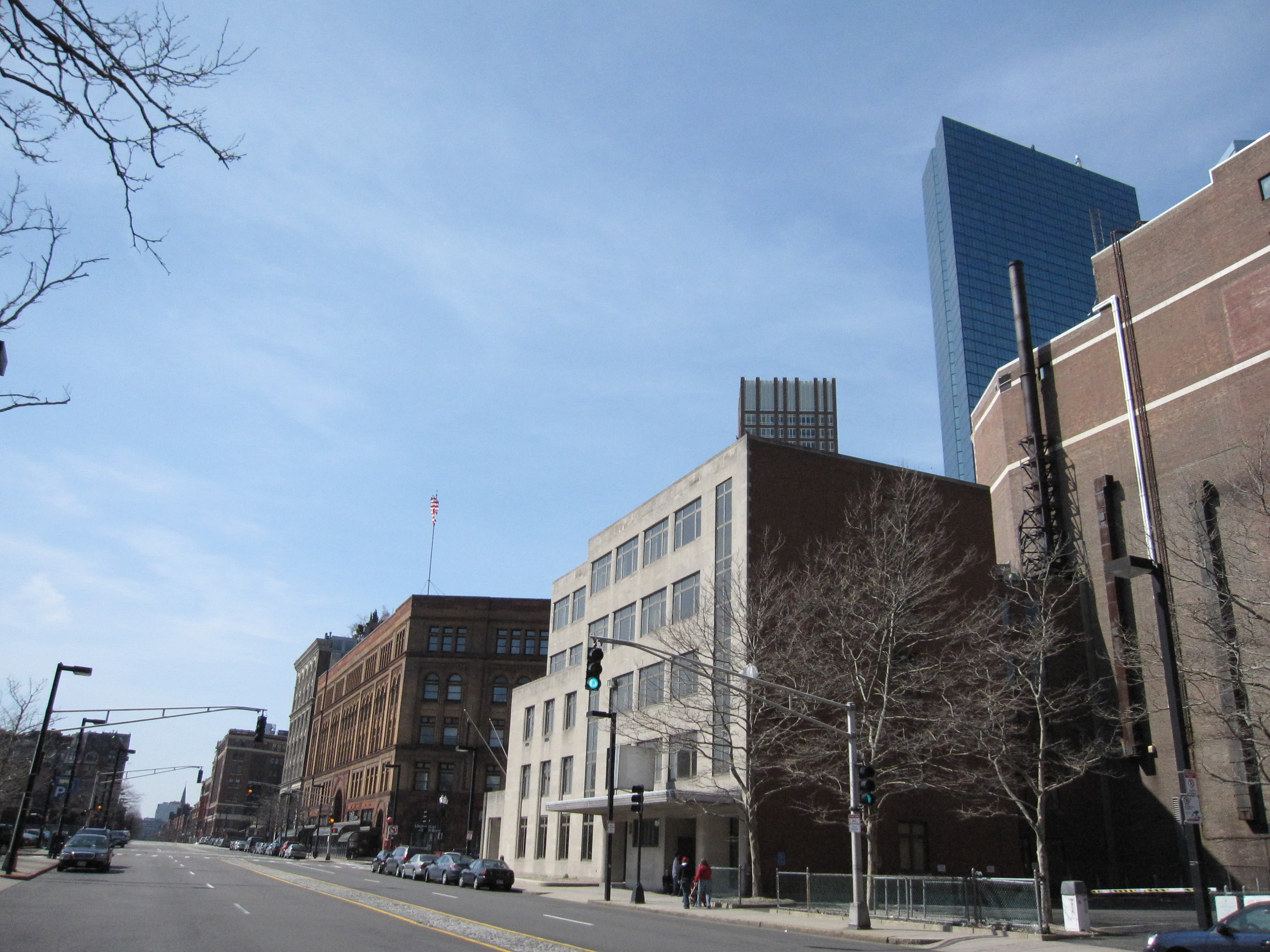
Columbus Avenue

The South End was one of many large-scale Boston landfill projects to create new residential districts. Construction began in 1849, on tidal marshes that surrounded Boston Neck. The street plan for the South End was patterned on 18th-century English models, with blocks of townhouses overlooking small parks in the centers of residential streets. The parks were built to make the neighborhood feel more like a community. Townhouses quickly became the predominant form of housing, and builders produced blocks of houses for middle-class families. The townhouses were built from 1850 to 1880, typically in a mix of architectural styles. The South End became a popular hospital district; the first was Boston City Hospital, which attracted other hospitals to the area. One was the Massachusetts Homeopathic Hospital, built in 1875. The hospital used fresh-air cures and home remedies on patients, and surgical cases were sent to the Boston University School of Medicine. The medical school came to the South End in 1874 with the New England Female College, the first college in the region to accept women. By the late 19th century, the South End was becoming increasingly populated by African Americans from the South. Although City Hospital admitted Black patients, they were not allowed in their training programs or hired as professionals. Cornelius Garland, a Black physician from Alabama, opened Plymouth Hospital and Nurse's Training School by 1908. By 1929, Plymouth Hospital was closed because City Hospital had begun to accept people of color into its medical and nursing programs.

The connection of Boston and Albany by railroad (by some of the various companies that would later merge into the Boston and Albany Railroad) was celebrated in 1841 as a way to keep Boston competitive with New York City as an Atlantic port. The New York Streets district, a residential area of the South End whose streets were named after cities on the route to Albany, arose south of the Boston and Worcester Railroad (the present-day Massachusetts Turnpike) over the next decade. Albany Street still exists, although it now ends at the turnpike instead of Kneeland; connecting it with Harrison Street from north to south were Seneca, Oneida, Oswego, Genesee, Rochester and Troy Streets. Troy is the present-day Traveler Street.

Nearly all the buildings in New York Streets began to be bulldozed in 1955 as part of an urban renewal project to clear slums and make room for industrial activity during a period characterized by urban decline. The resulting superblock was redeveloped into the headquarters of the Boston Herald. The Herald-Traveler Corporation extended from the new Herald Street to Traveler Street until 2012, when it moved to the Seaport District in South Boston. It was redeveloped as a mixed-use area known as the Ink Block, with apartments, a grocery store, restaurants, and other retail businesses. Other populated sites in the South End received similar treatment, particularly the early high-rise, high-density Cathedral Housing Projects adjacent to Holy Cross Cathedral and high- and low-rise redevelopments such as Castle Square, from 1964 to 1966.

The South End is residential and commercial. Since it is near access to railroads and port facilities, it attracted a number of manufacturers. Albany Street, along the Roxbury Canal, became occupied by warehouses and factories and was the center of Boston's furniture and piano-making industry by the 19th century. The South End has new developments that will add residential and commercial space. According to the Boston Redevelopment Authority (BRA), a new project will be built on Albany Street which will "include two hotels: a 16-story select service hotel, which will have a restaurant on its first floor; and a 9-story extended-stay hotel. The hotels together will have approximately 408 rooms. While the split between the two types of hotels has not been finally determined, current plans anticipate approximately 210 rooms in the select service hotel and approximately 198 rooms in the extended-stay hotel. The select-service hotel will include an approximately 4,000 square-foot (approximately 267-seat) restaurant on its first floor. A 3-level, above-ground parking garage with approximately 137 parking spaces will serve both hotels." The project was expected to provide about 200 new jobs for construction workers and "employ approximately 200 employees (full-time equivalents) in management, operations, customer service, retail, and food service functions."

==== Jazz ====
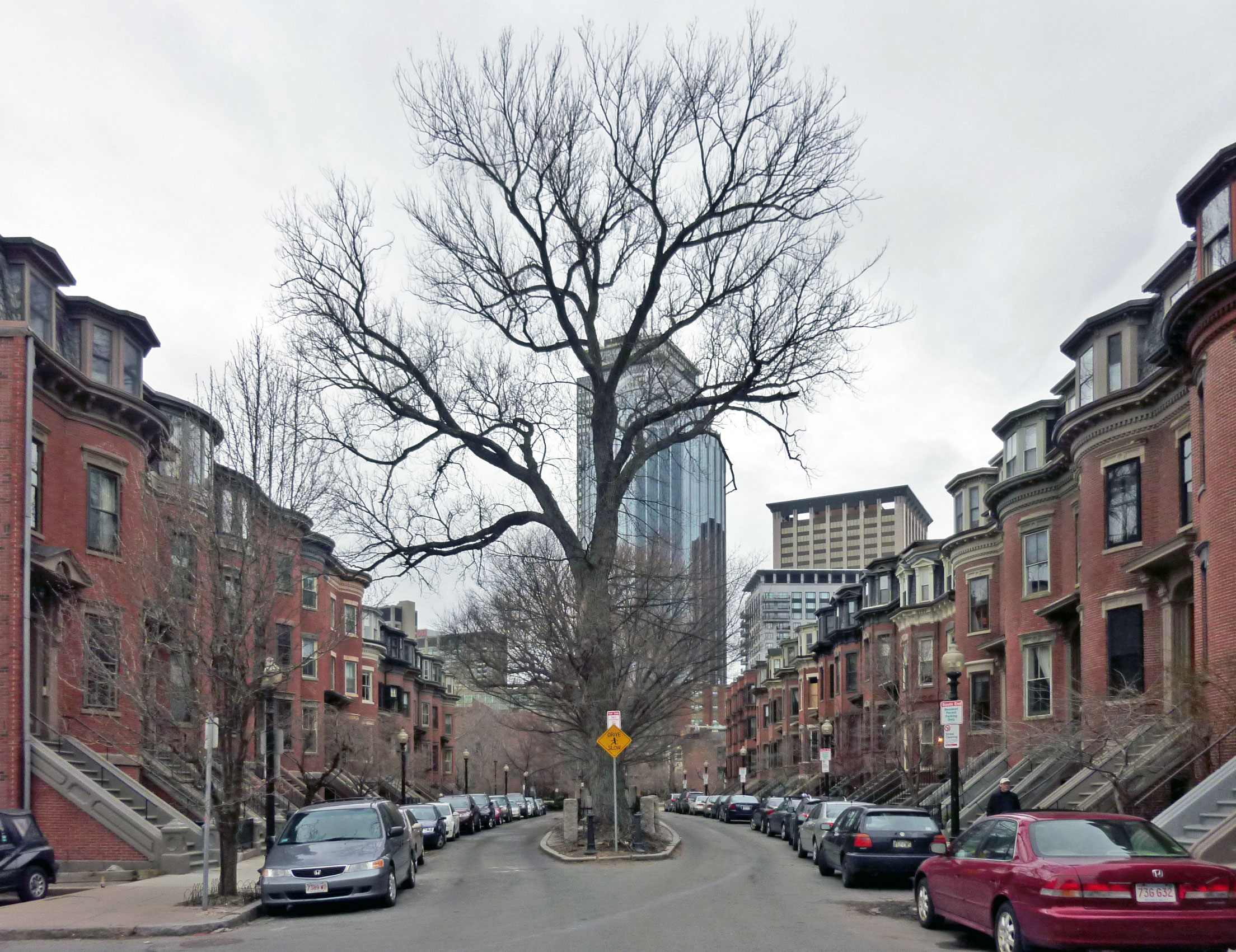
Braddock Park

Until the 1950s, the South End and nearby Roxbury was a jazz mecca with clubs such as the Royal Palms, Eddie Levine's, the Pioneer Club, Handy's Grille, Tic-Toc, Connolly's, Estelle's, the Hi-Hat, The Savoy, The Cave, Basin Street, Louie's Lounge, and Wally's Paradise; Wally's is the only club still in operation. The American Federation of Musicians Local 535 was the top black musicians' union in the country from 1915 to 1970, with local and national musicians including Duke Ellington, Cab Calloway, Chick Webb, Earl Hines, and Jimmie Lunceford. Its offices were originally above Charlie's Sandwich Shoppe (whose walls are lined with photographs of jazz musicians who ate there), but moved to 409 Massachusetts Avenue around 1930. Local 535 and Local 9 (the white union) were ordered by the courts to merge into Boston Musicians Association Local 9-535 in 1970, and most of the Black musicians left.

==== Education ====
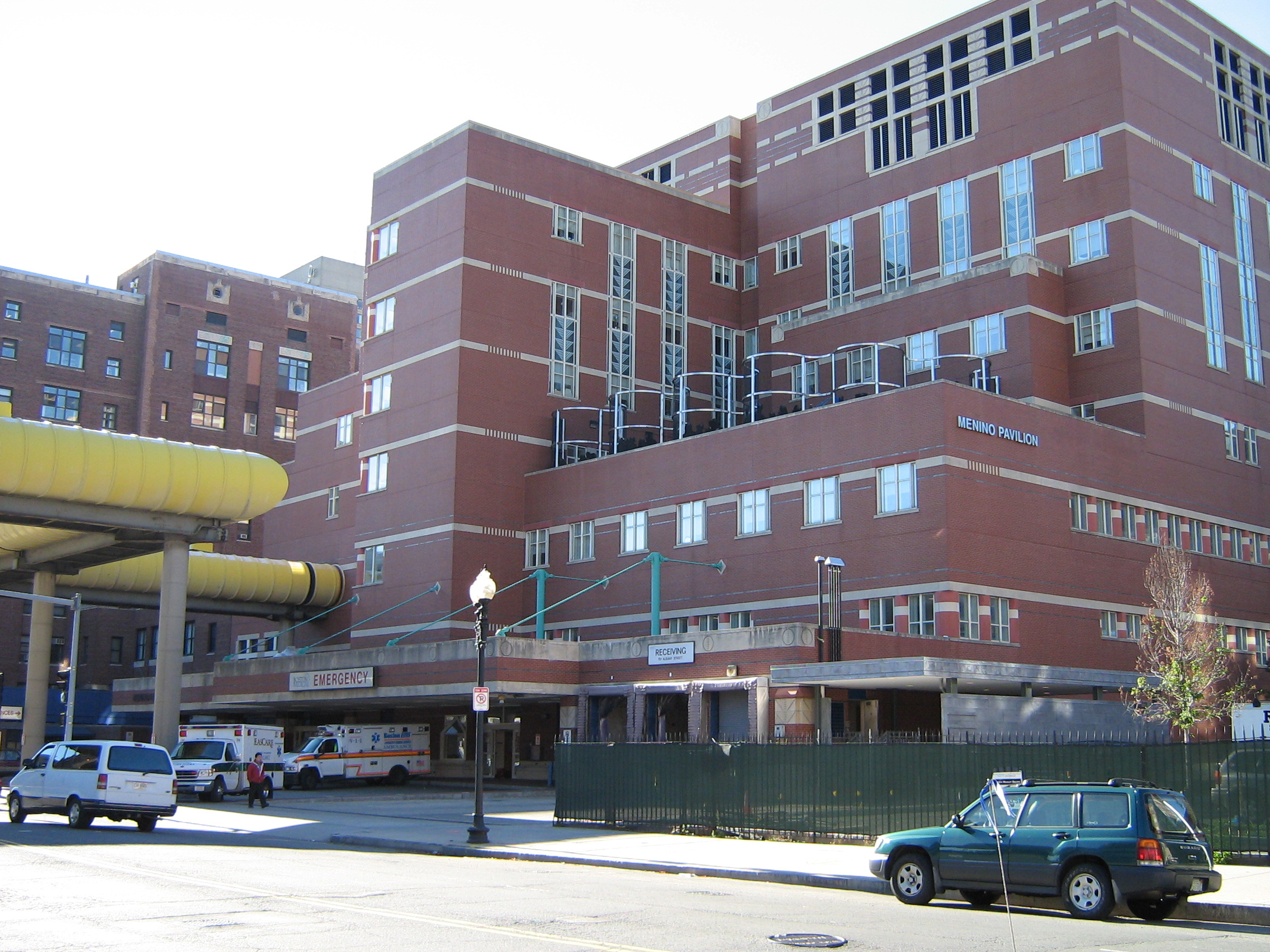
Boston University Medical Campus

The South End has five primary and secondary schools, providing education from kindergarten through grade 12 as part of Boston Public Schools. The McKinley South End Academy is four schools, a special-education school that focuses on behavioral, emotional and learning needs. The Josiah Quincy Upper School teaches grades six to 12, balancing core-subject requirements with world languages, the arts and physical education. Blackstone Elementary School has over 500 students from diverse backgrounds from pre-kindergarten to grade five. Benjamin Franklin Institute of Technology, established in 1908, is a four-year South End school for students desiring a technical degree.

== Community resources ==
The South End is served by three public libraries, and the South End Branch has a diverse collection of popular and scholarly materials for adults and children. It has local-history documents, DVDs, CDs and audiobooks for adults, and recurring programs for children. Programs for adults include monthly book-discussion groups and a weekly English conversation class. The Blackstone Community Center, on West Brookline Street, is one of 35 community centers for youth and families and the only one serving the South End and lower Roxbury. Blackstone's mission is to enhance the quality of life for Boston residents by "supporting children, youth, and families through a wide range of programs and services", and it has a number of programs for children and adults. Two major hospitals in the South End are Boston Medical Center and Boston University School of Medicine. The South End Community Health Center, a board-governed non-profit "comprehensive, health care organization for all residents of the South End and the surrounding communities", is "committed to providing the highest quality, culturally and linguistically sensitive, coordinated health care and social services to every patient, regardless of their ability to pay". Services include adult medicine, behavioral health, dental care and nutrition to name a few.

Other community organizations include South End Baseball, Youth Enrichment Services, the South End Lower Roxbury Open Space Land Trust, Mytown (an organization training youth to lead walking tours on neighborhood and Boston history), the South End Historical Society, Inquilinos Boricuas en Accion, and United South End Settlements. The Animal Rescue League of Boston, founded in 1899 by Anna Harris Smith, is at 10 Chandler Street. The league has an animal shelter, an animal-cruelty investigation and prosecution law-enforcement department, a rescue department, an animal-behavior department and Boston Veterinary Care, an outpatient veterinary facility.

=== Diversity ===
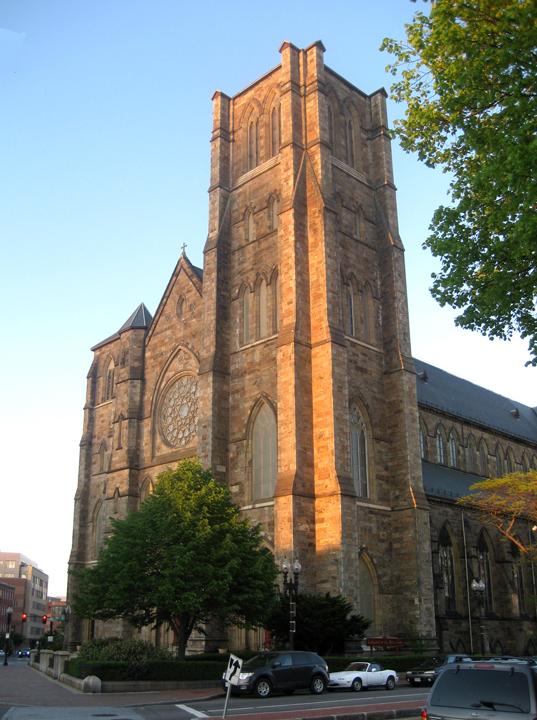
Holy Cross Cathedral

The South End's population has been diverse since the 1880s when Irish, Lebanese, Jewish, African-American, Puerto rican, Italian, and Greek people began to settle in the neighborhood. A number of immigrants from Canada's maritime provinces found economic opportunity in Boston, and homes in the South End, during the 1930s.

In the 1940s, particularly after the end of World War II, the South End's rooming houses became home to a growing number of gays and lesbians; single-sex rooming houses provided a home and social cover for LGBT people. Late in the decade, the Hispanic population began to grow; at first, much of this settlement was centered around the Cathedral of the Holy Cross. The neighborhood remains diverse, with people of nearly every race, religion, and sexual orientation.

Income levels are anecdotally reported as stratified, with concentrations of wealth and poverty, but neither the U.S. census or the city of Boston reports the neighborhood's income. Although gentrification is sometimes cited as a reason for the flight of poorer, non-white residents, the neighborhood has maintained racial and income diversity due to its subsidized, publicly owned, or otherwise low-income housing units and a homeless shelter. Subsidized, below-market-rate housing developments such as Methunion Manor, Cathedral Housing (a public housing project), Villa Victoria, Tent City, Lenox Street Apartments, Camden, Camfield Gardens, 1850 Washington St, and Mandela Homes and represent evolving attitudes to public-housing design and governance.

Although all neighborhoods in Boston experience crime, the city has a comparatively low incidence of street crime. Some parts of the South End are known for street crime, and others are family friendly. The neighborhood has more public playgrounds per square foot than other Boston neighborhoods. The South End is known as an increasingly upper middle class neighborhood, although it is still home to many lower income residents. Some long-time residents are being pushed out by rising rents and property taxes.

The South End has been known as a gay, artistic, and cultural neighborhood, although costs in the neighborhood are rising. Unlike cities such as New York and Los Angeles, there are no city policies to help artists keep their long-term studios. Existing art galleries, however, are flourishing. GardenMoms, one of Boston's most popular online parent groups with over 2,500 members citywide, was founded by several South End mothers in 2002.

== 2010 census ==
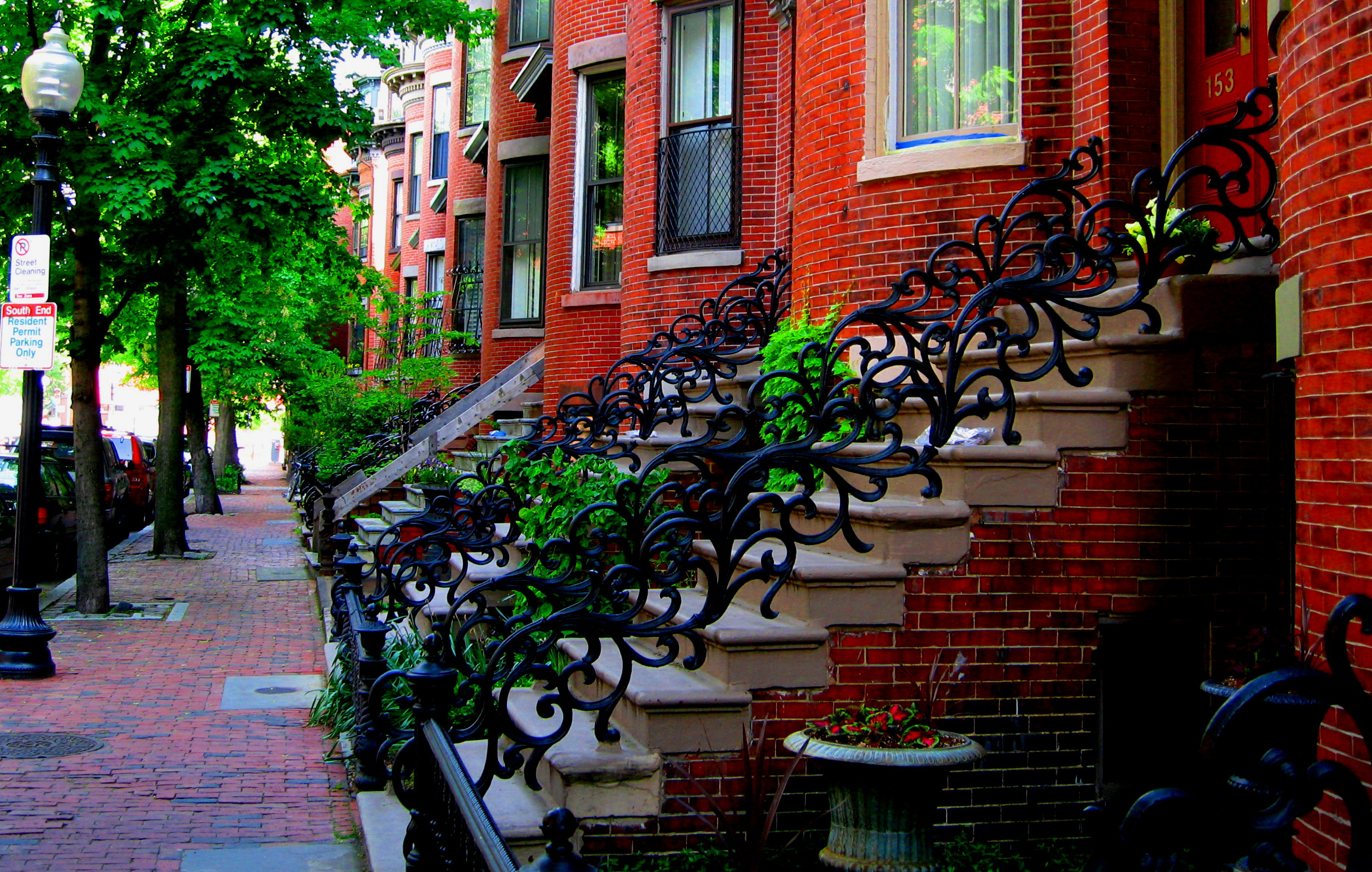
South End townhouses

According to the 2010 census, the South End's population was 24,577 (a 12.2-percent increase from 2000). The neighborhood was 55.2 percent white, 13.3 percent Hispanic or Latino, 12.5 percent Black, 16.2 percent Asian, and 2.7 percent other groups. As for age, 33.8 percent of the population was between 20 and 34 years old and eight percent were under age nine; 5.9 percent of South End residents were 10–19 years old, 31.2 percent were 35-54, 10.5 percent were 55-64, and 10.6 percent were 65 or older. The median age for the South End is 36. About 55.2 percent of the population hold a college degree; 29.2 percent have a bachelor's degree, and 26 percent hold a graduate degree. The primary language spoken in the neighborhood is English (65.6 percent), followed by Spanish (12.9 percent), Chinese (10.4 percent), French (2.7 percent), Portuguese (one percent), and other languages (7.4 percent). The median annual South End income is $57,699, with 10.9 percent of the population earning $50,000 to $74,000. There are 12,831 households in the South End, with 23.3 percent living in a family that includes a wife and a husband; 47.4 percent live alone. In 2010, 45.2 percent of residents did not own a vehicle. Thirty-four percent of residents use public transportation, excluding taxis. The South End has 58.1 percent of its population working in the management, business, science, and arts sectors, with 79.1 percent of the labor force between the ages of 20 and 34. According to the 2010 census, 72.6 percent of the South End has lived in the same place for the past year; 12.8 percent moved to a different location in the same county, 7.5 percent moved from a different county, and 5.9 percent moved from a different state to the South End.

== Public transportation ==
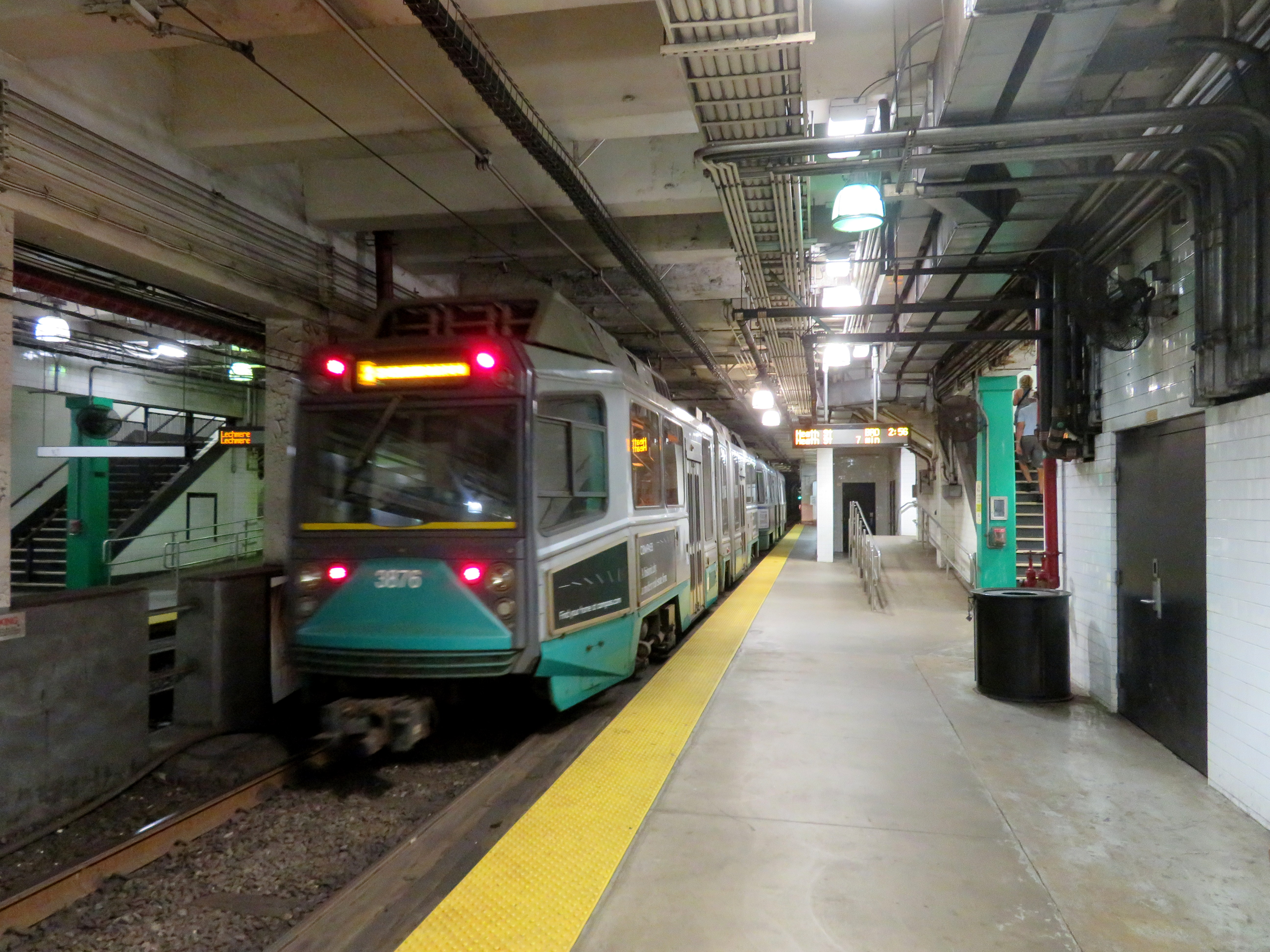
Prudential station on the Green Line

The South End is near MBTA subway stops, including Copley, Symphony, and Prudential stations on the Green Line; and Ruggles, Massachusetts Avenue, and Back Bay stations on the Orange Line. Commuter rail service on the Franklin/Foxboro, Needham, and Providence/Stoughton lines is available at the Ruggles and Back Bay stations. Back Bay is also served by the Framingham/Worcester Line. These commuter rail lines continue to South Station.

The bus rapid transit Silver Line routes SL4 and SL5 between Nubian Square and downtown Boston run on Washington Street through the South End, with several stops between Lenox and Herald Streets. The neighborhood is also served by local MBTA bus routes. Major routes include route 43 on Tremont Street and route 1 on Massachusetts Avenue.

== Gallery ==
=== 1950s ===
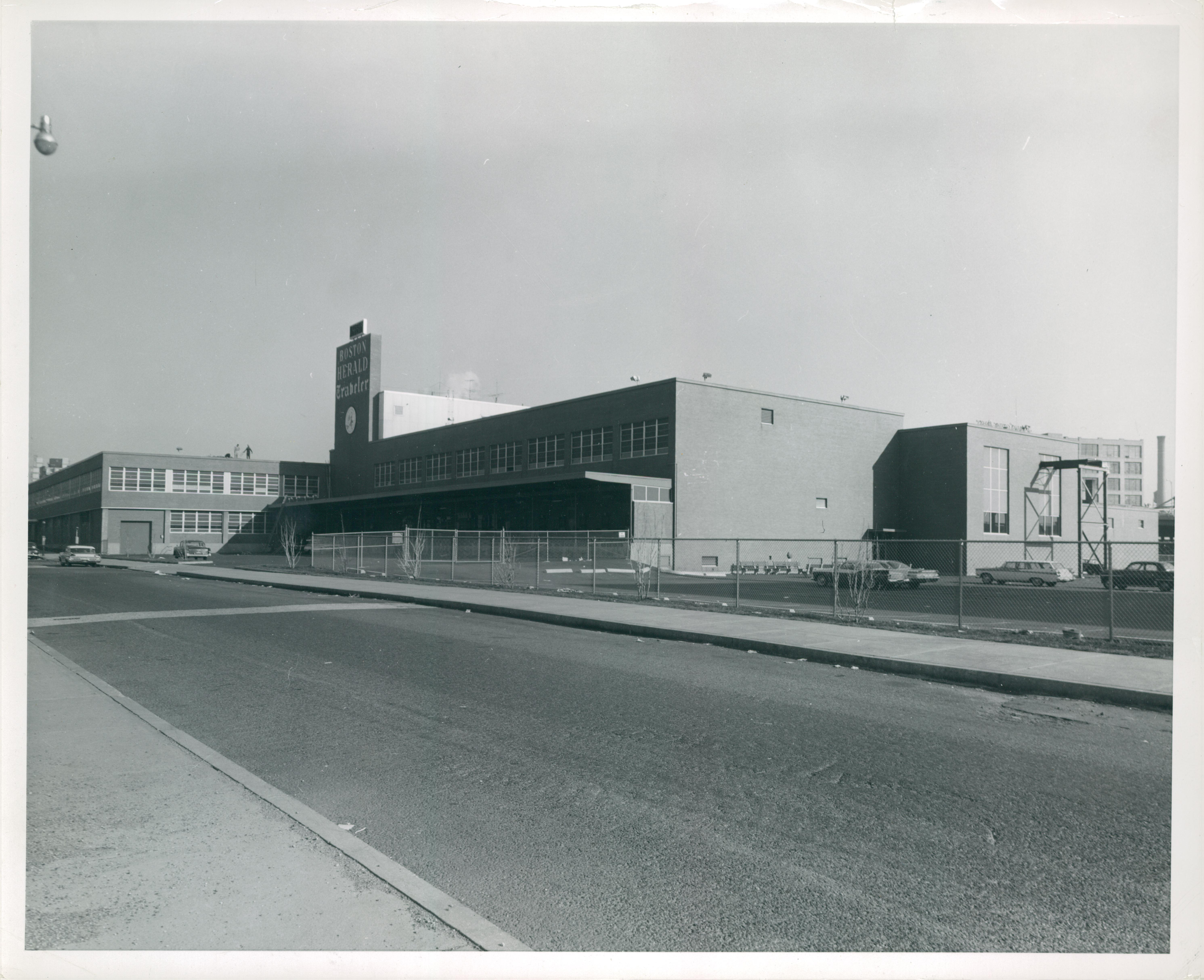
Boston Herald Traveler Building, 1952–1956

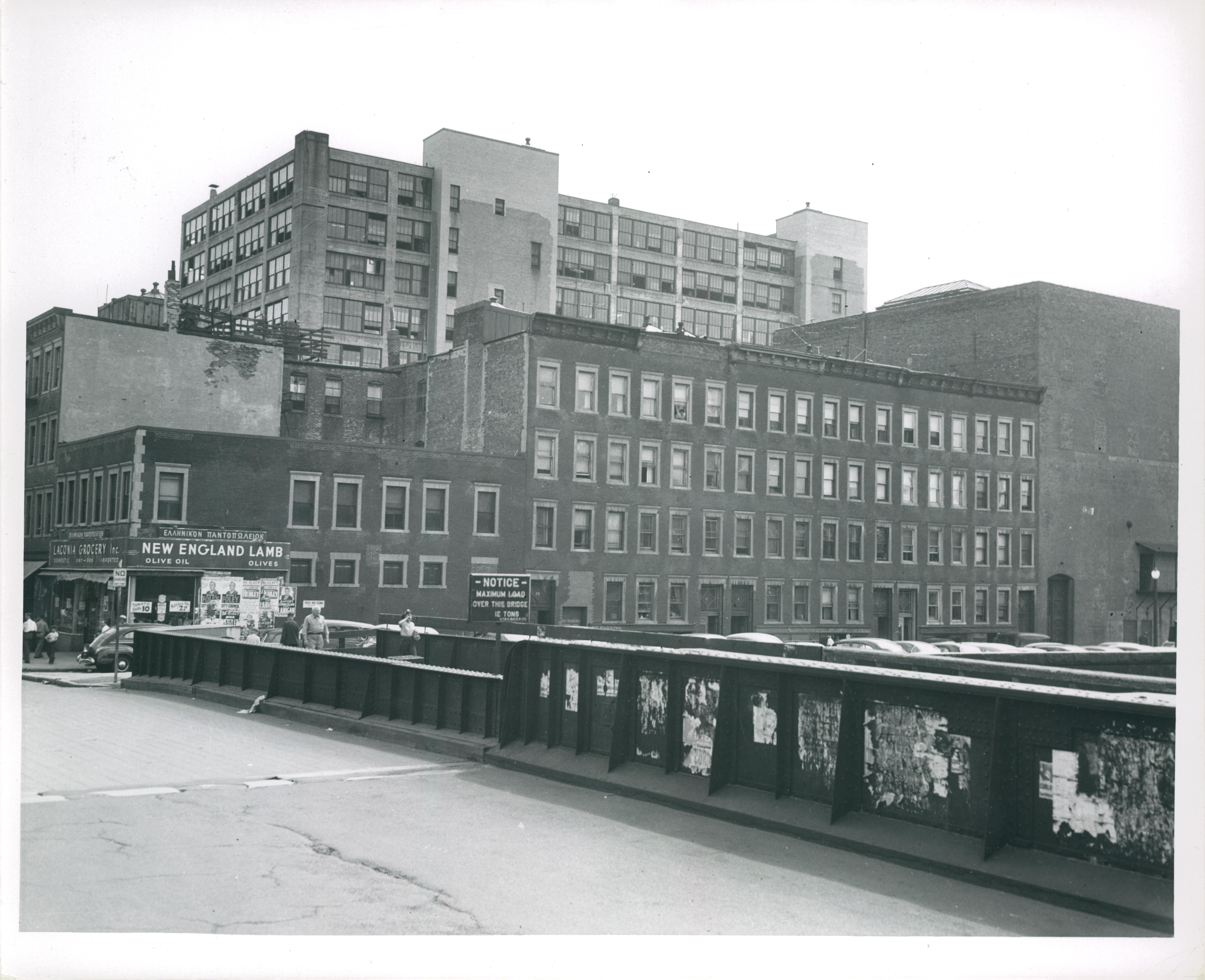
Motte Street with 1000 Washington in the background, June 24, 1952

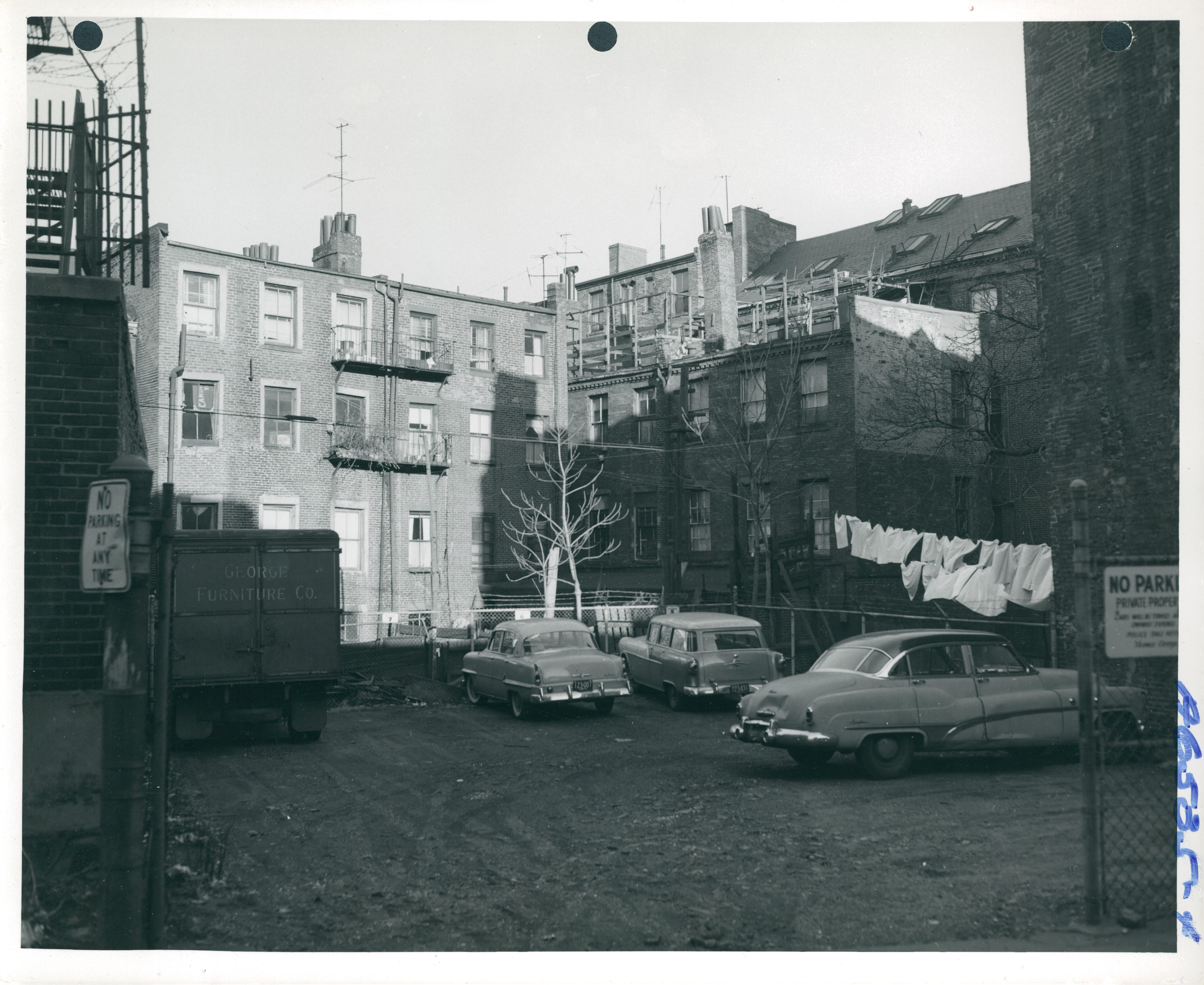
Rear of houses on Harrision Avenue and Johnny Court, 1952–1958

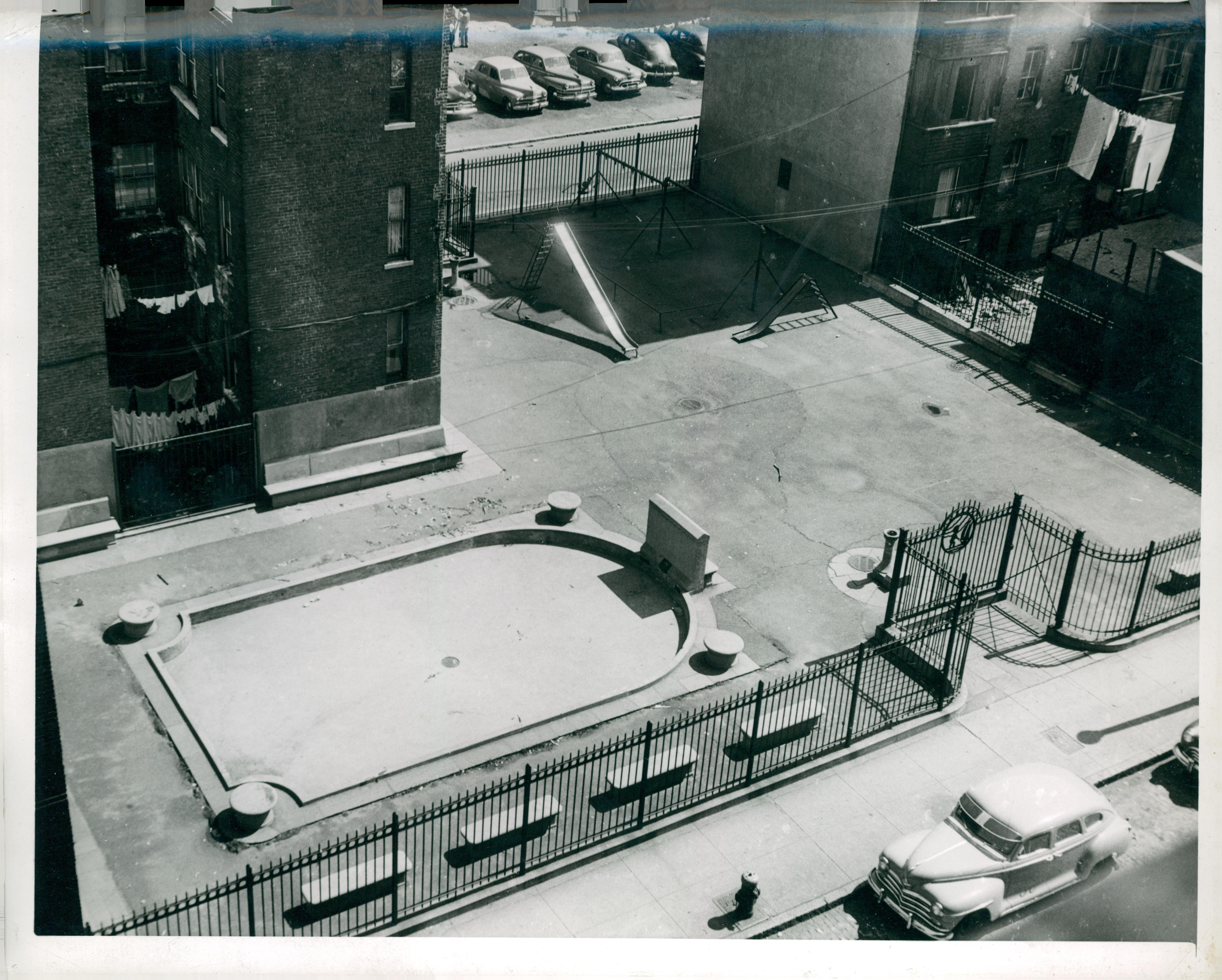
Tot lot on Troy Street, 1952–1958

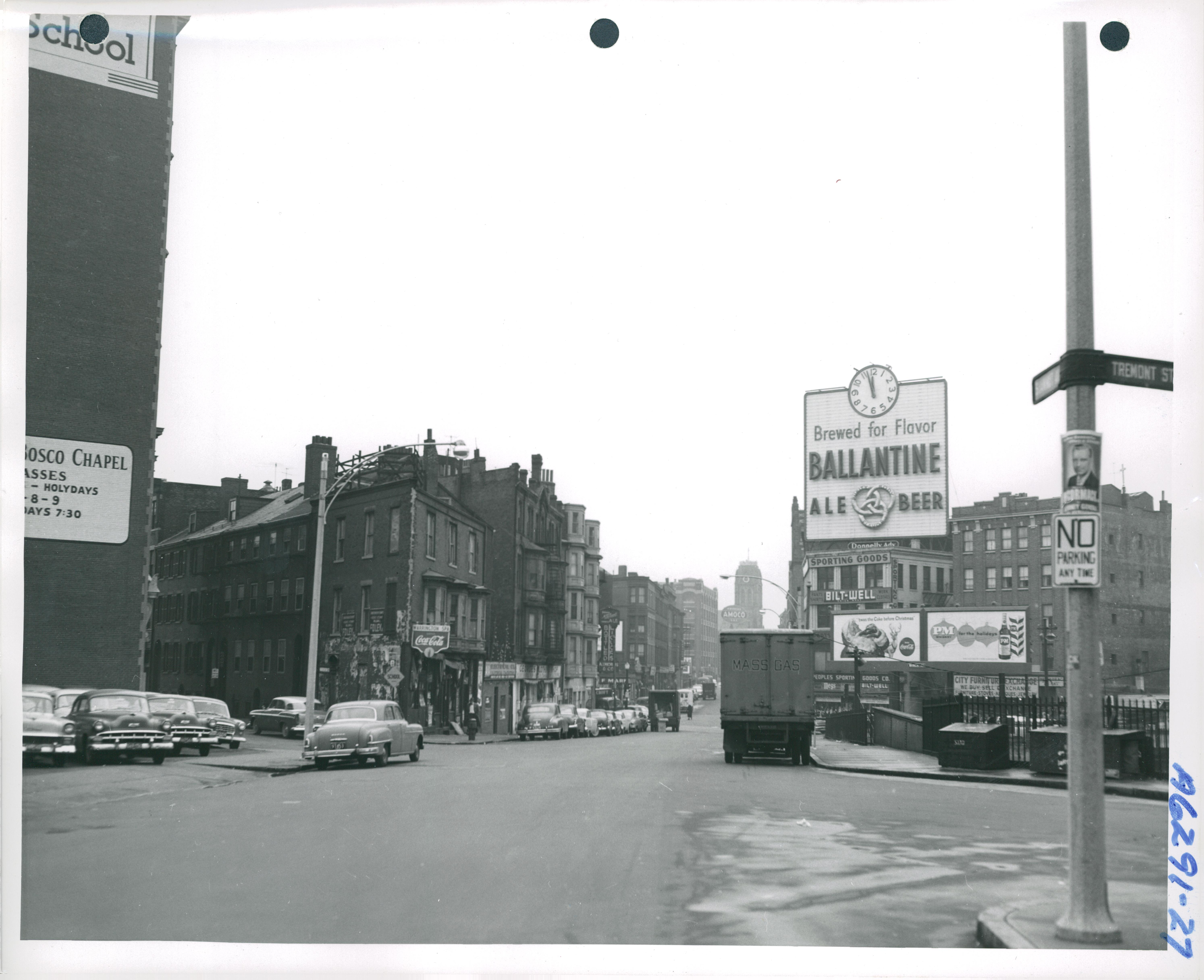
Shawmut Avenue at Tremont Street, December 4, 1956

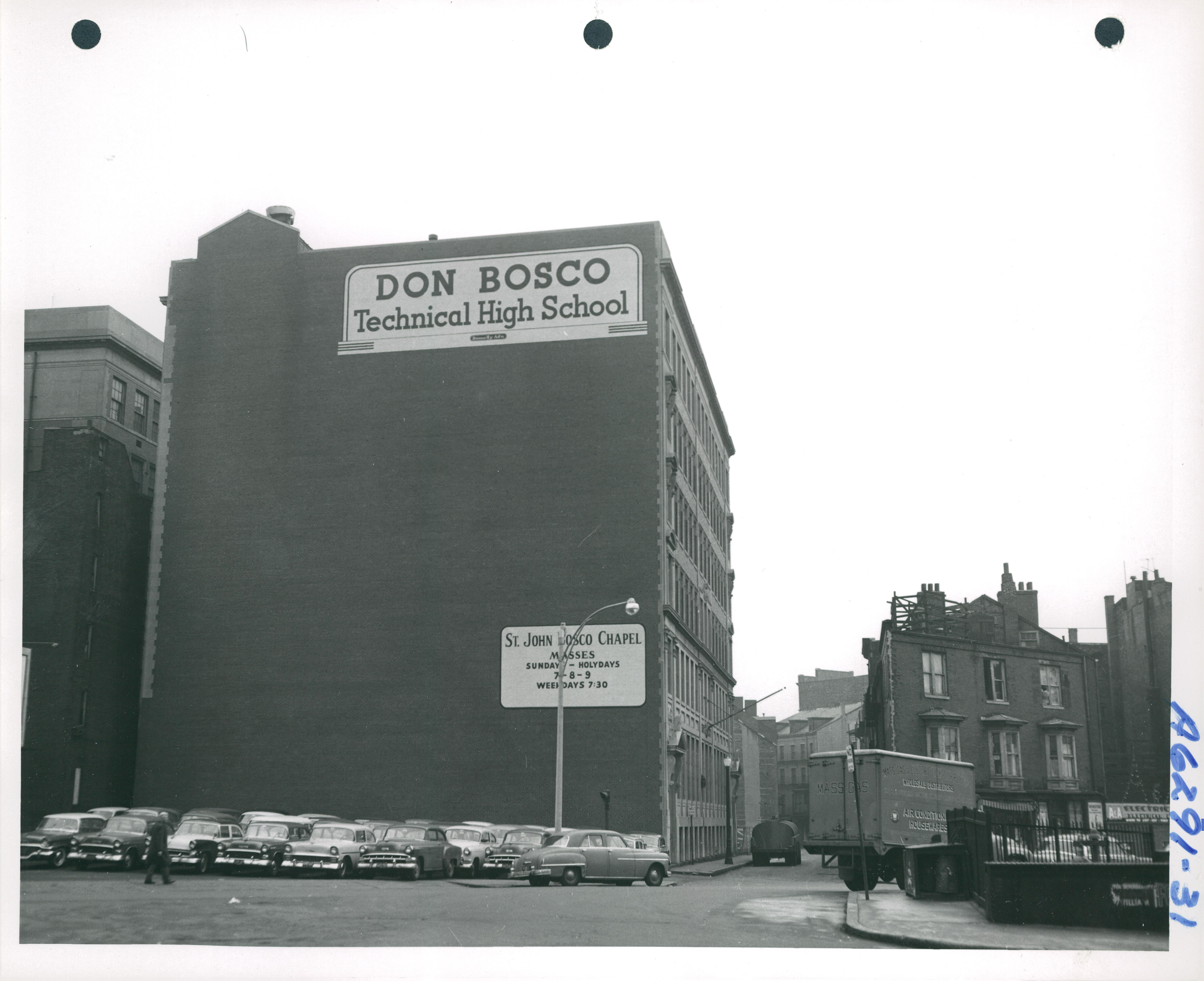
Don Bosco Technical High School, Warrenton Street, December 4, 1956

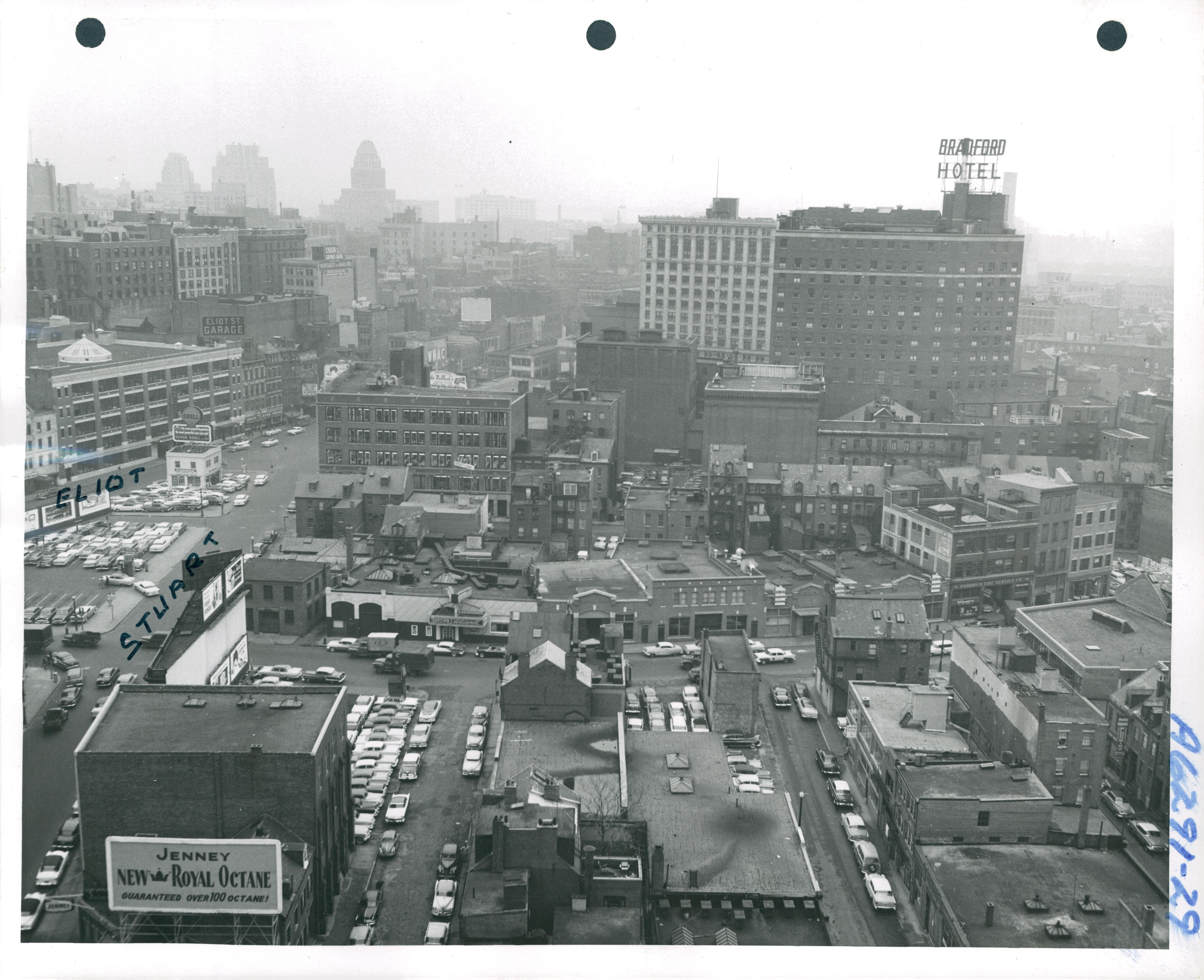
Northeast from roof of 100 Arlington Street, December 4, 1956

=== Contemporary images ===
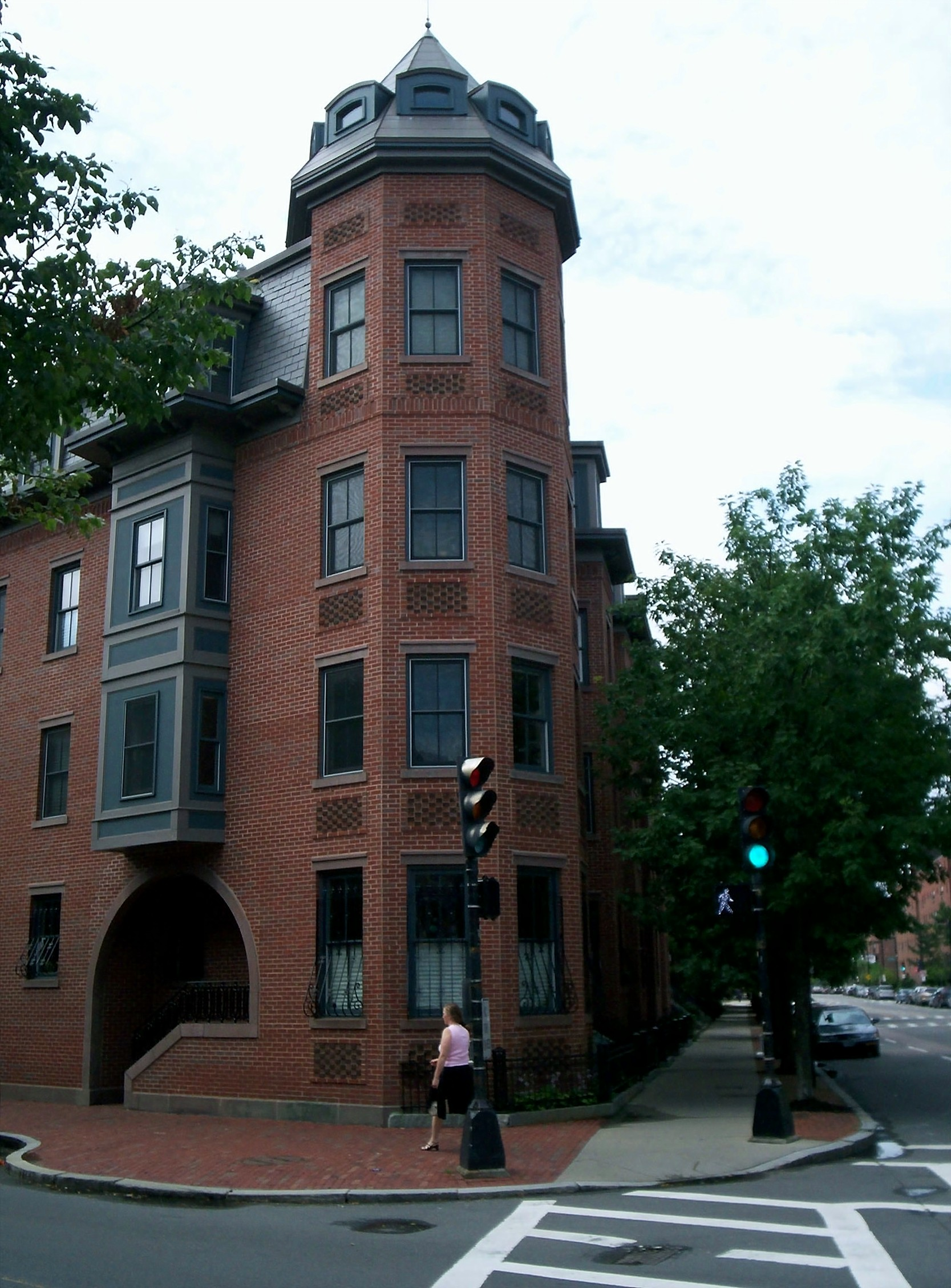
Columbus Avenue and Dartmouth Street

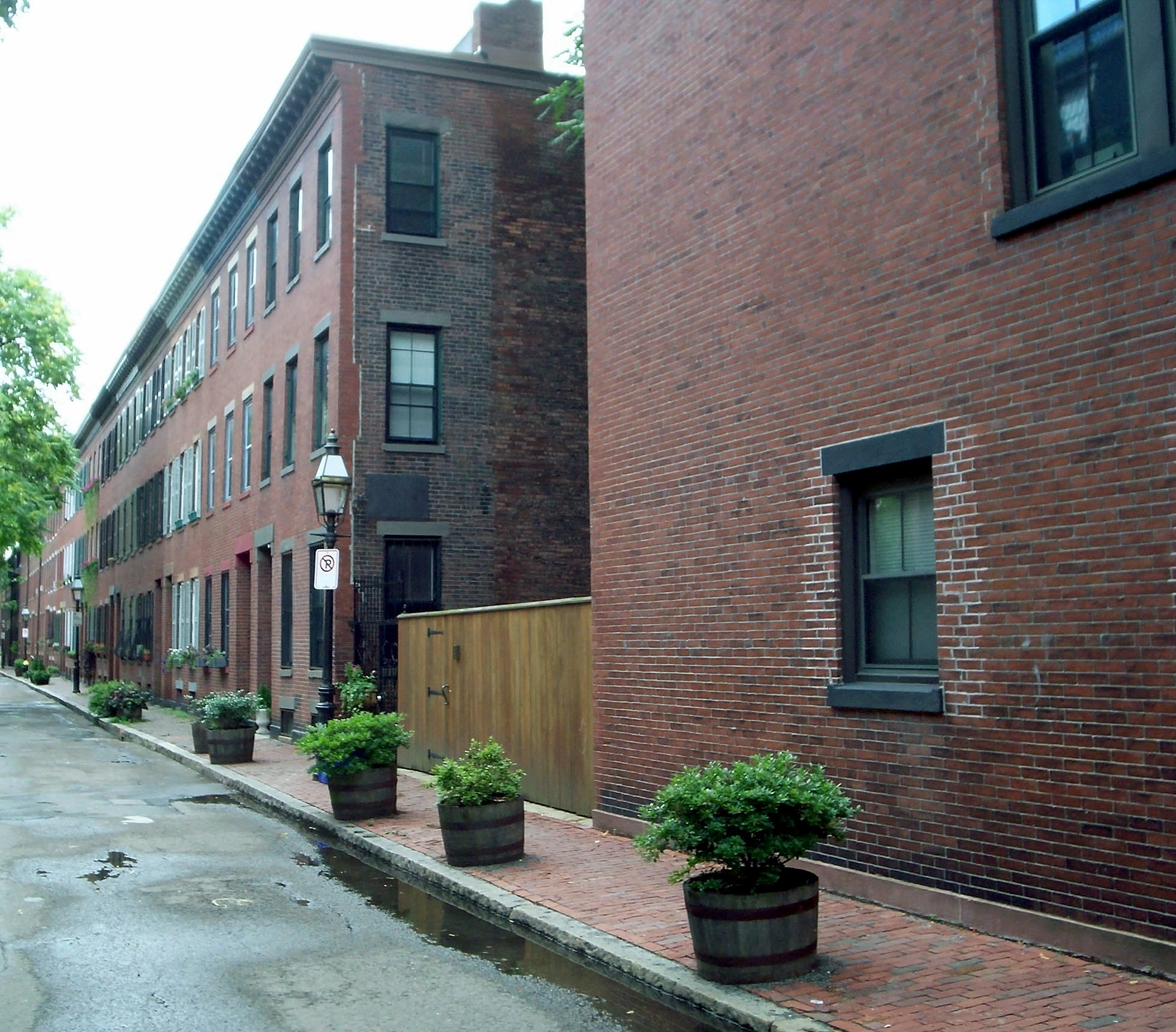
Lawrence Street

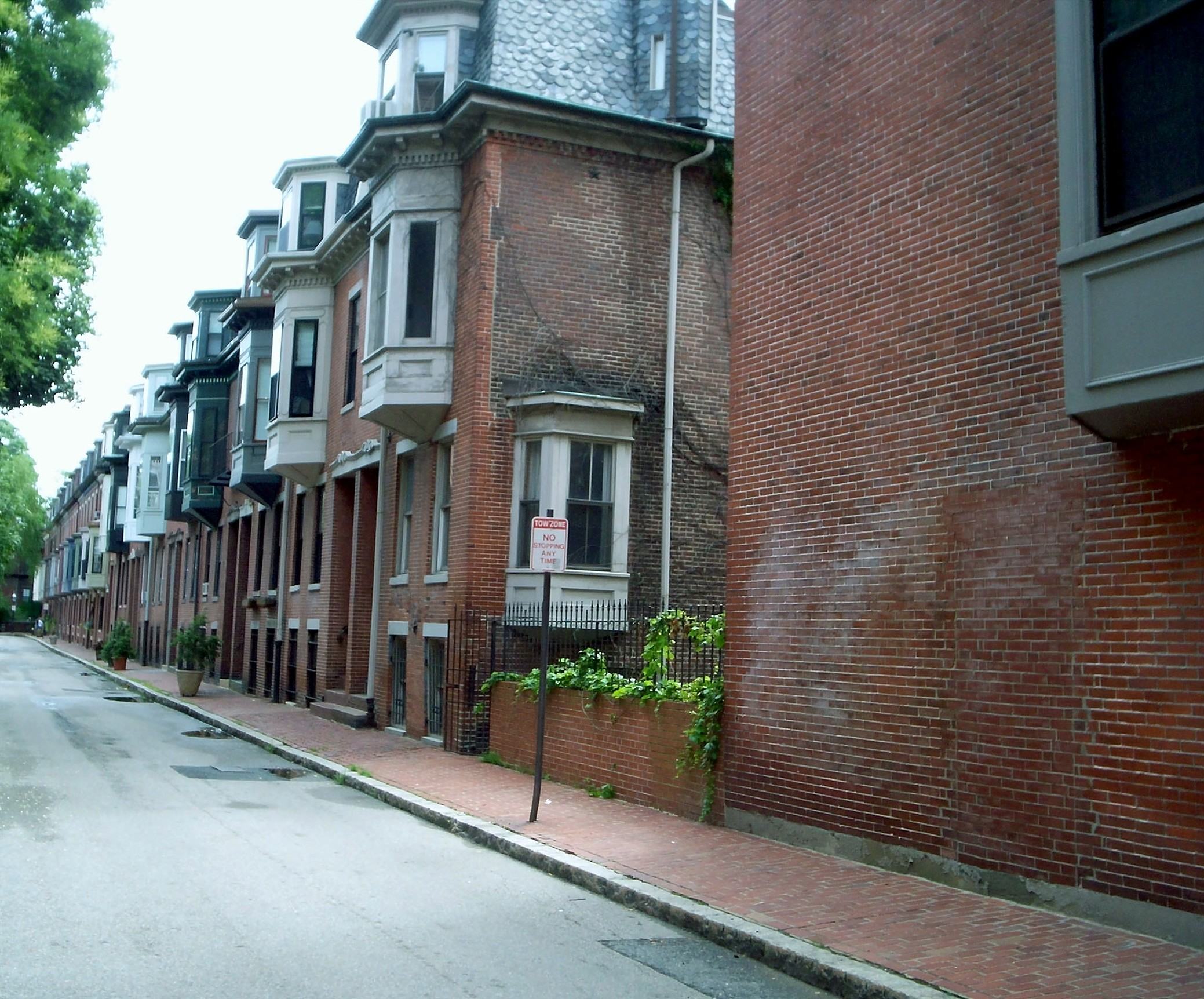
Dartmouth Place

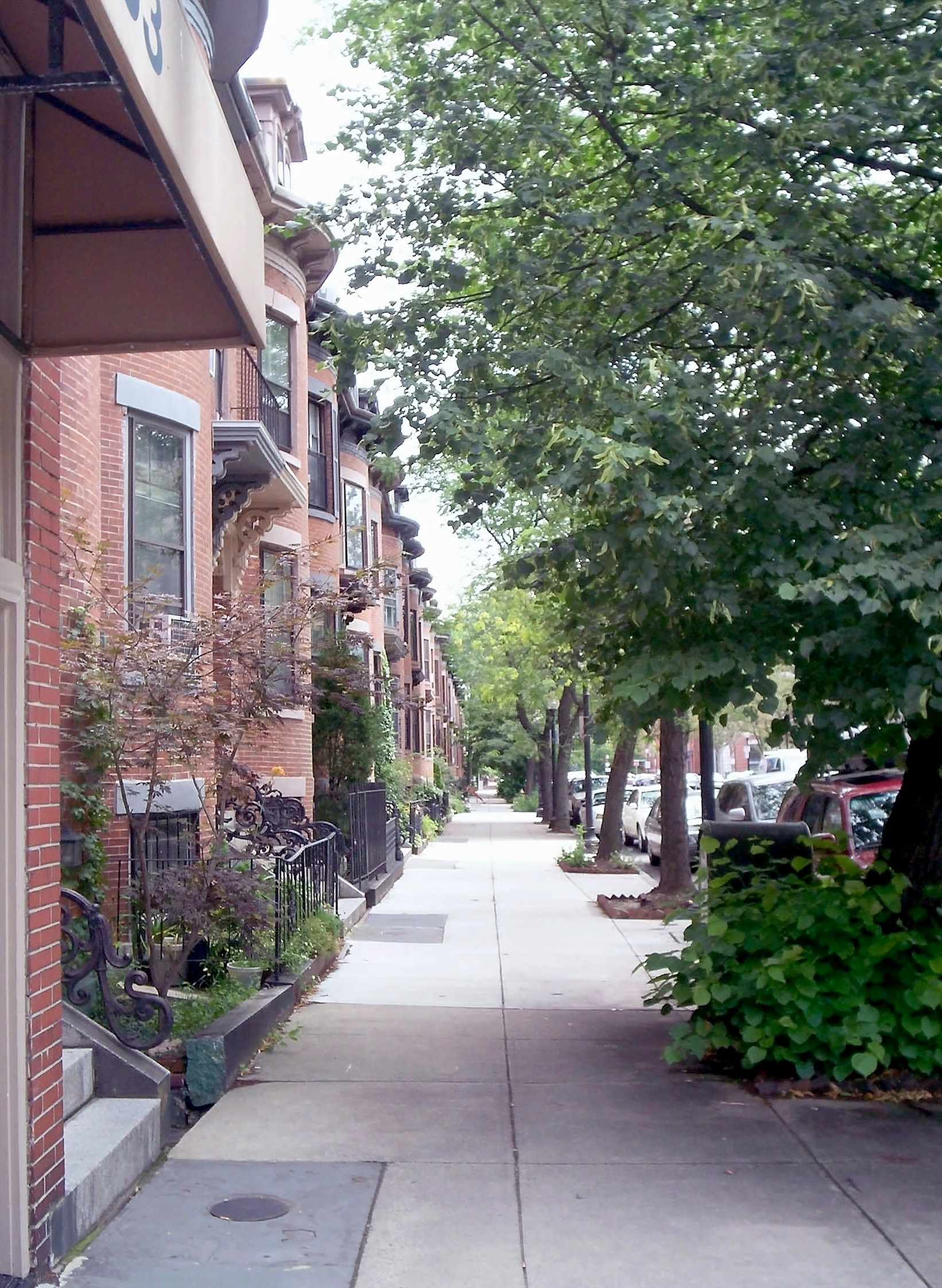
Side street

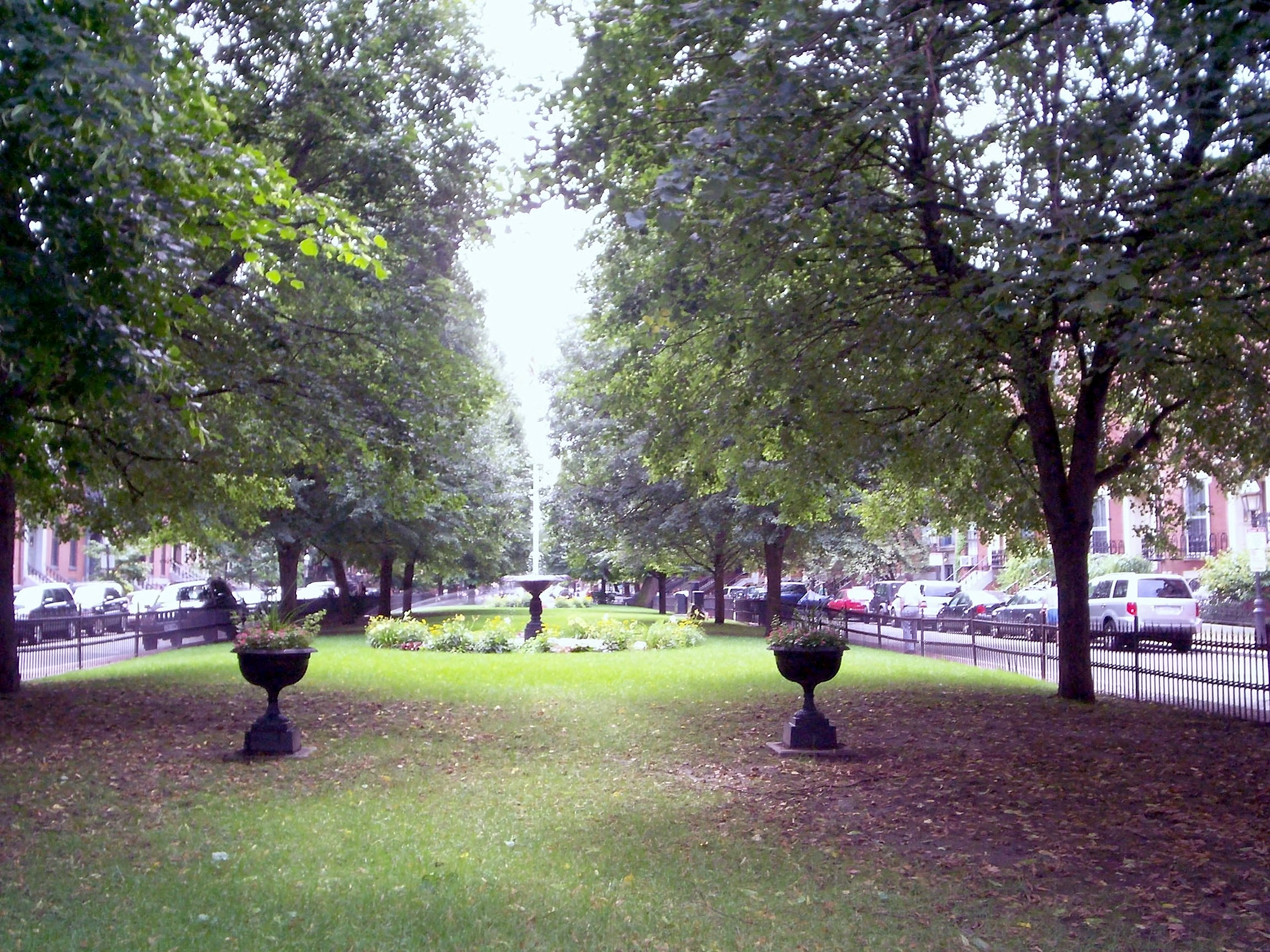
Union Park Street

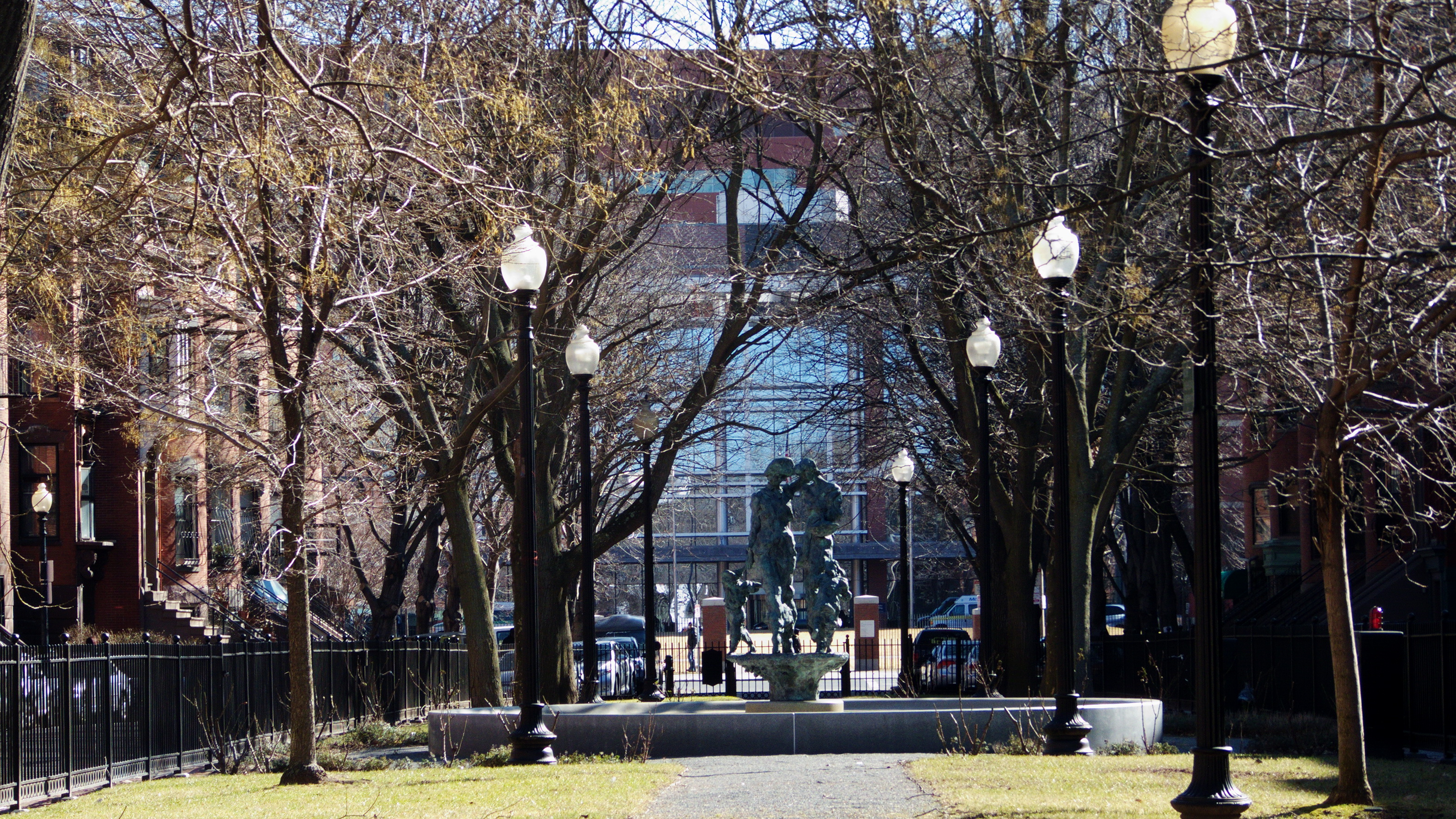
Worcester Square

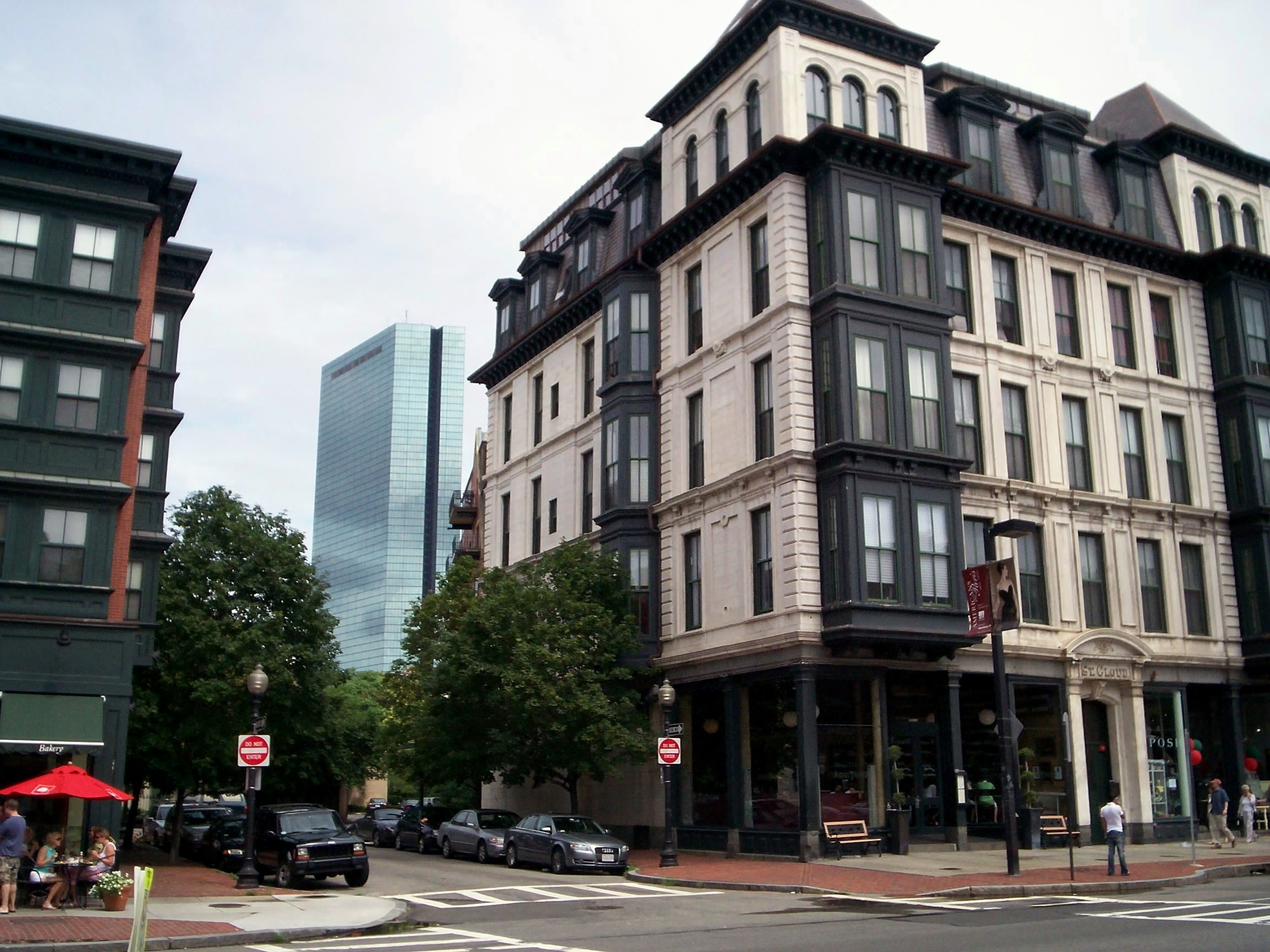
Union Park and Tremont Streets

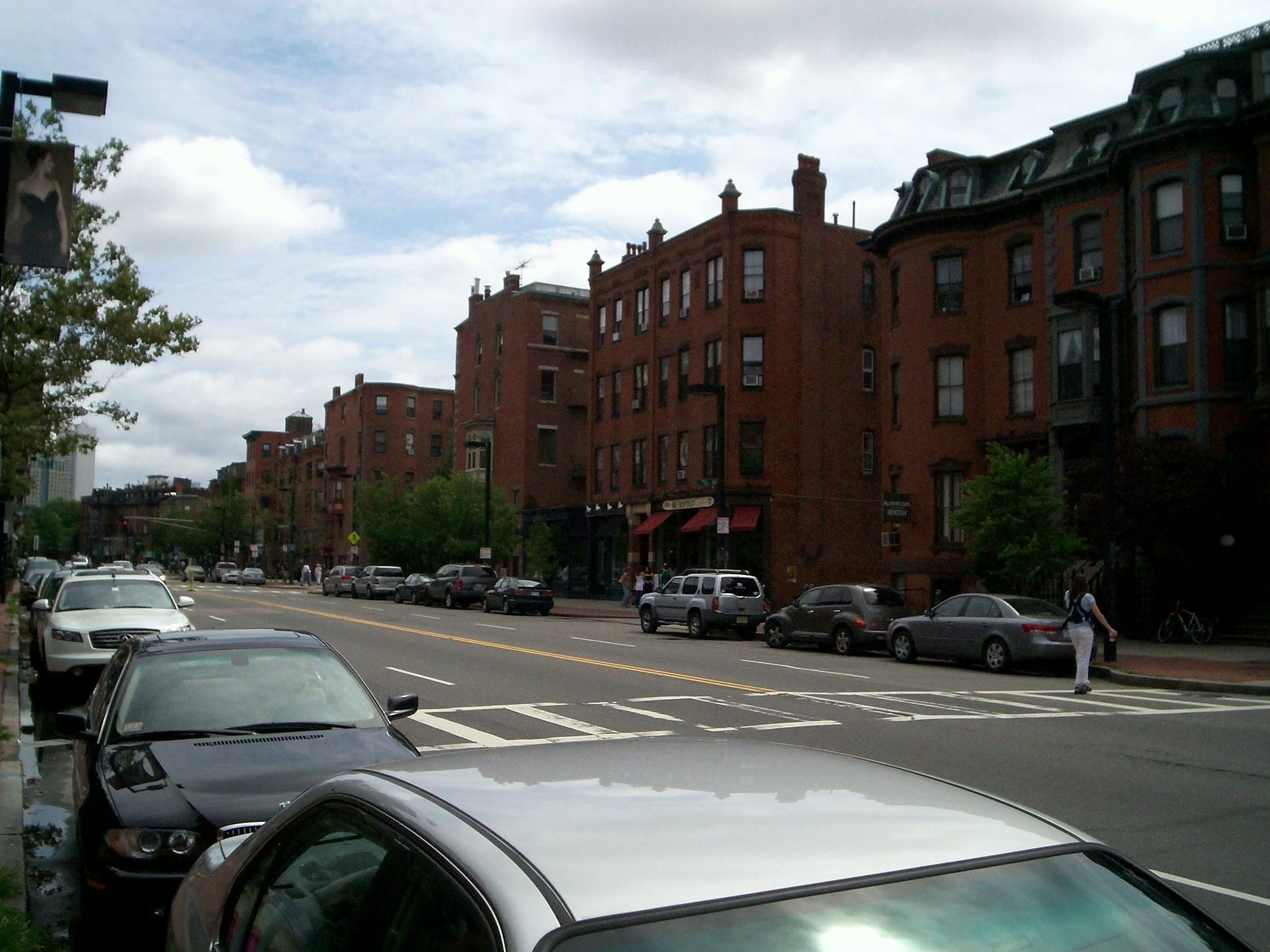
Tremont Street

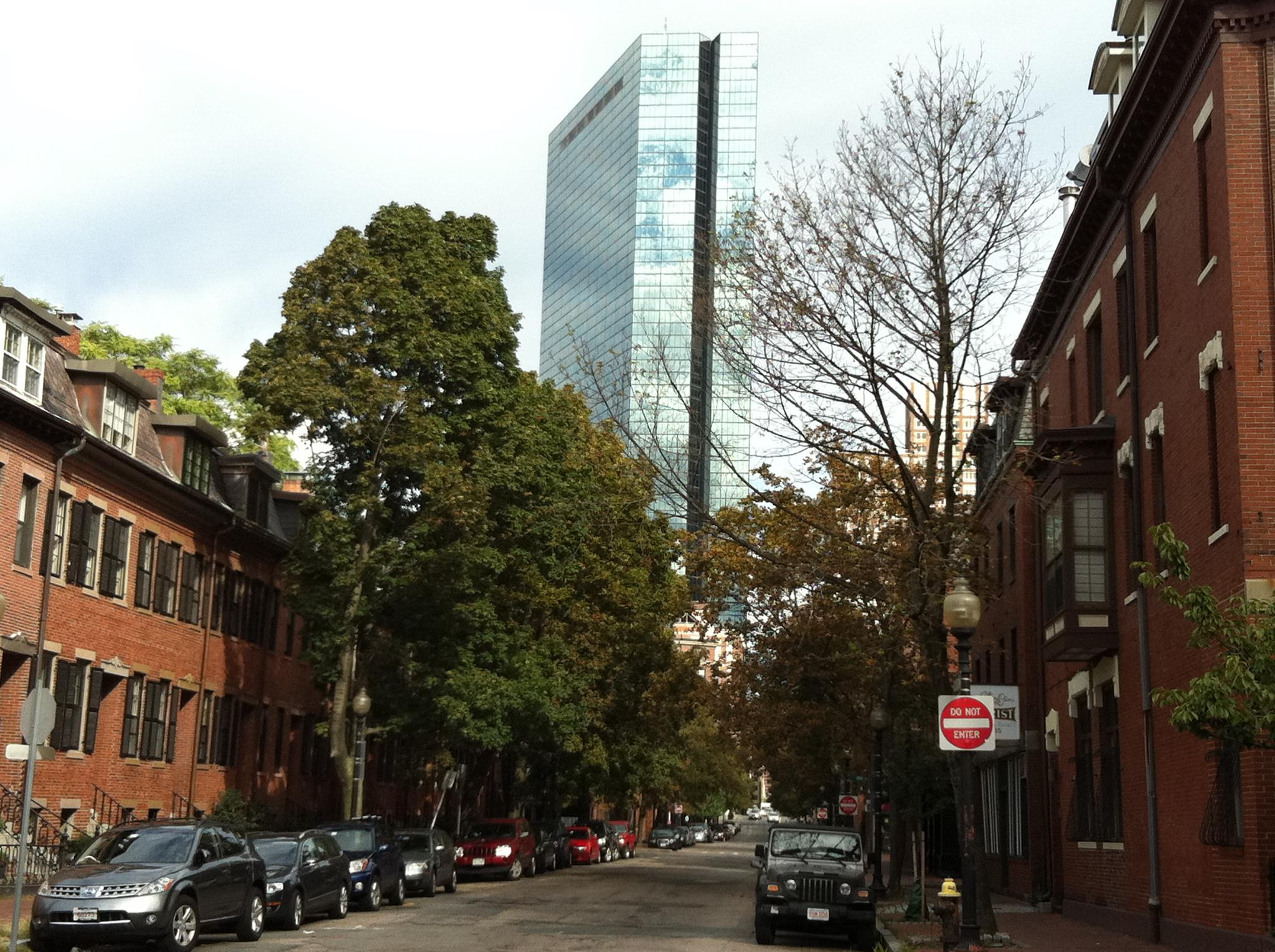
Clarendon Street, with the John Hancock Tower in the background
