= Franklin and Blackstone Squares =

Coordinates: 42.3393°N 71.0731°W

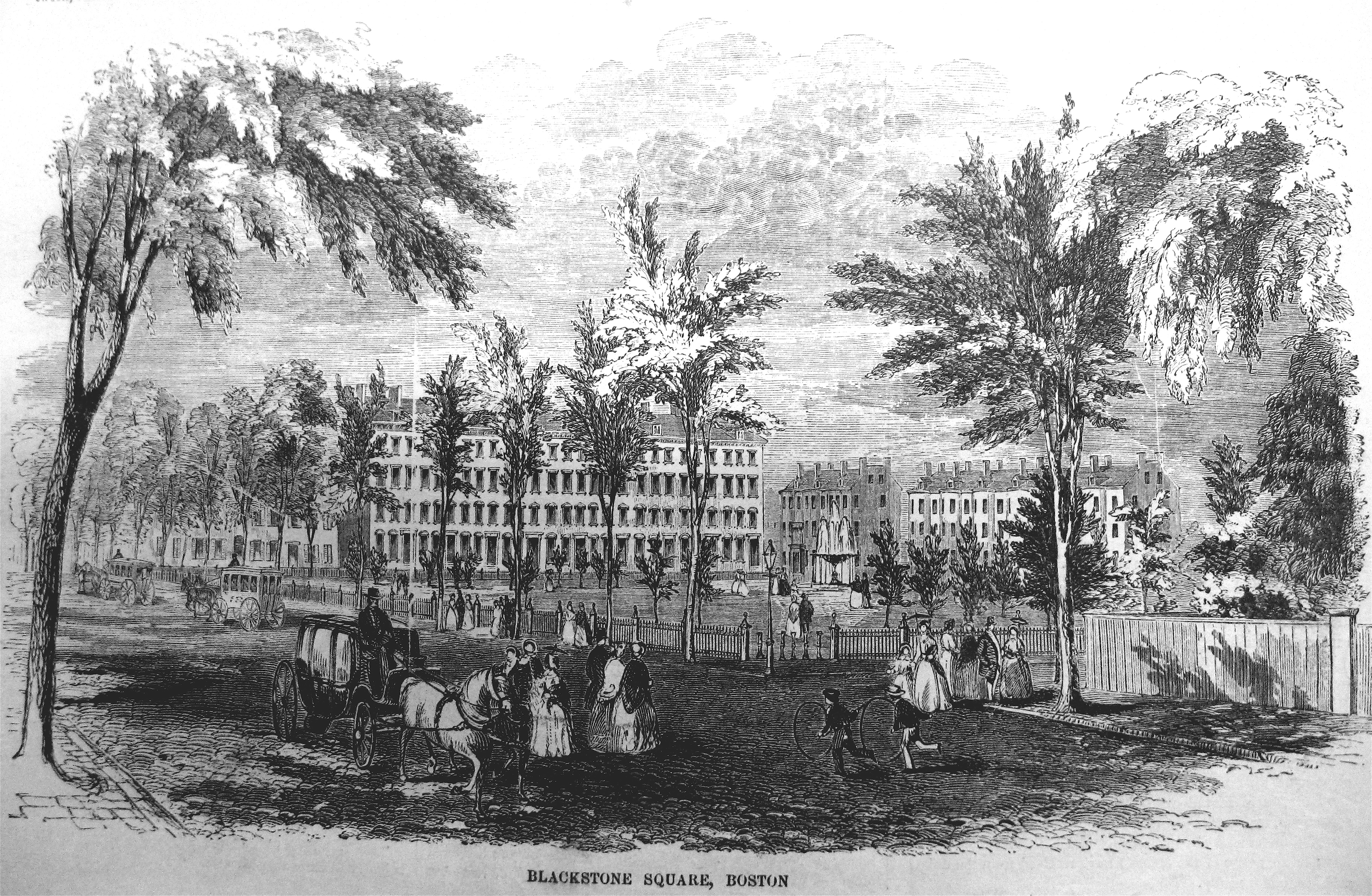
Blackstone Square, Boston, 1850s

Blackstone and Franklin Squares are public parks located in the South End neighborhood of Boston, Massachusetts.

== Description ==
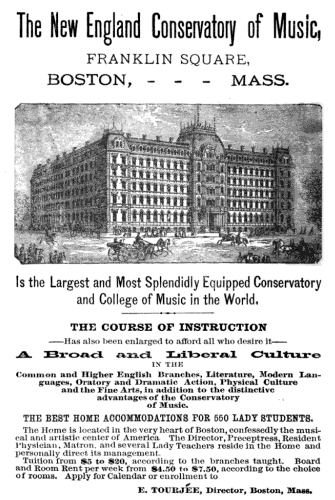
New England Conservatory, Franklin Square, Boston, 1880s

The two squares are separated by Washington Street and bounded on the north by Brookline Street, to the east by St George Street, to the south by East and West Newton Streets, and to the west by Shawmut Avenue. An iron fence surrounds the perimeter of each square, with entrances at each of the corners. There is also an entrance to Blackstone Square at the intersection of Pembroke Street and Shawmut Avenue and a fifth entrance to Franklin Square along Newton Street.

Blackstone Square encompasses 2.44 acres (0.99 ha) and Franklin Square spans 2.48 acres (1.00 ha). Both are maintained under Land and Water Conservation Fund of the National Park Service

The squares operate under Article 97 of the Massachusetts State Constitution, which states:

... The people shall have the right to clean air and water, freedom from excessive and unnecessary noise, and the natural, scenic, historic, and esthetic qualities of their environment; and the protection of the people in their right to the conservation, development and utilization of the agricultural, mineral, forest, water, air and other natural resources is hereby declared to be a public purpose.

In the furtherance of the foregoing powers, the general court shall have the power to provide for the taking, upon payment of just compensation therefor, or for the acquisition by purchase or otherwise, of lands and easements or such other interests therein as may be deemed necessary to accomplish these purposes.

Lands and easements taken or acquired for such purposes shall not be used for other purposes or otherwise disposed of except by laws enacted by a two thirds vote, taken by yeas and nays, of each branch of the general court. The general court shall have the power to enact legislation necessary or expedient to protect such rights.

Blackstone and Franklin Square can be reached by the MBTA Silver Line routes SL4 and SL5, and bus routes #8 and #10.

== History ==
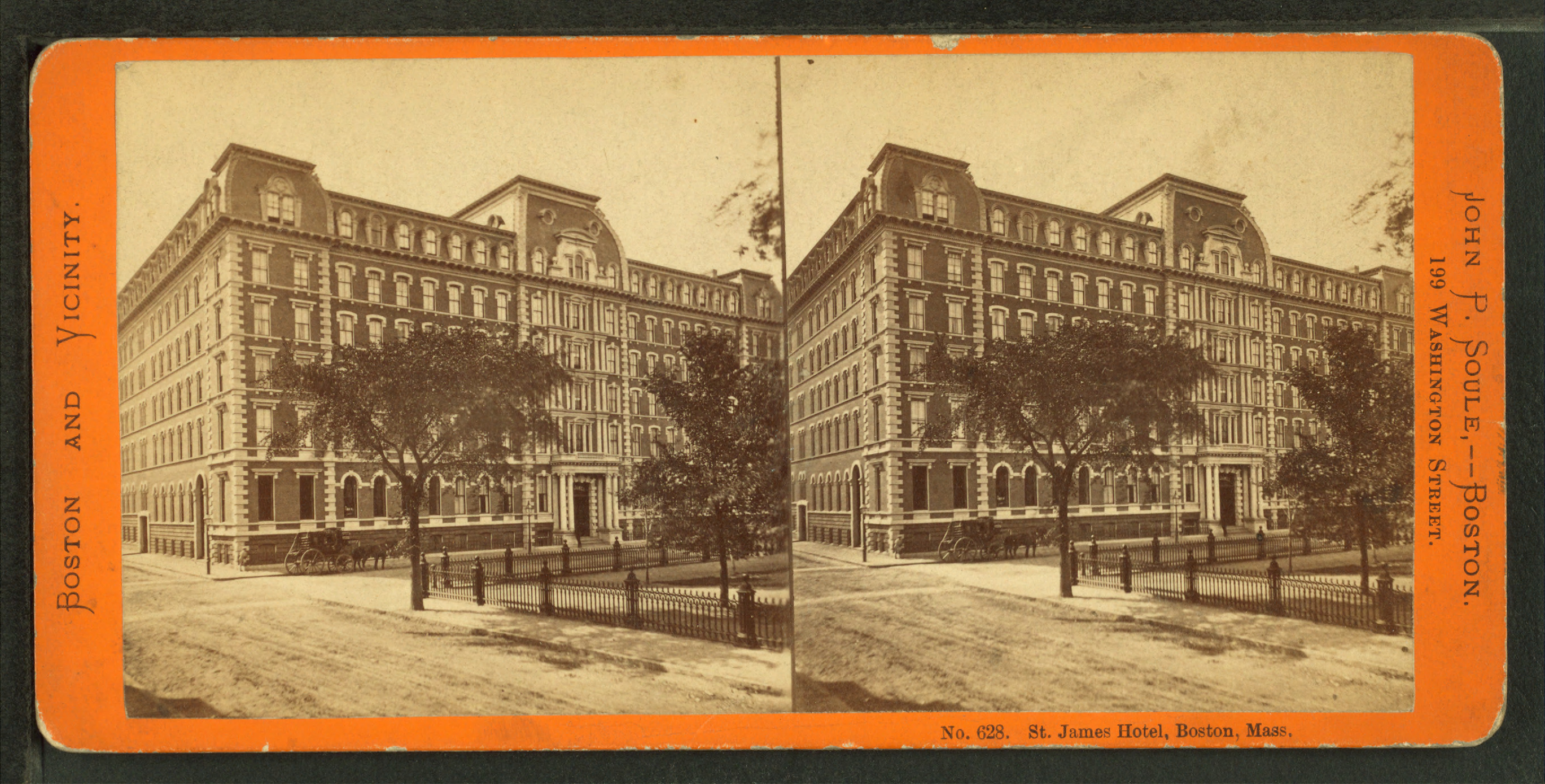
St. James Hotel, Franklin Square, Boston, 19th century; photo by John P. Soule

Charles Bulfinch, who created the plan for the South End, originally intended the two squares to be one, calling it Columbia Square. Franklin Square opened in 1849 and Blackstone Square subsequently opened in 1855.

The St. James Hotel, now the Franklin Square House Apartments, served as the exterior backdrop of the popular 1980's NBC hospital drama series, St. Elsewhere.

In 1979, after years of neglect, local resident Brian Davidson began an effort to clean up the squares. He personally picked up trash and after several years the city of Boston began a revitalization project that included new fences, fountains, benches, and trees.

== Features ==
=== Foliage ===
A variety of trees are planted in and around the parks. Surrounding the exterior perimeter of the park are Sugar Maple (Acer saccharum). Inside the park and lining the walkways are Silver Linden (Tilia tomentosa). There is a large White Oak (Quercus alba) in Franklin Square as well.

=== Fountains ===
There are two identical fountains, one in each square, located centrally at the intersection of the walkways. At the base of each fountain are four stylized fish surrounding an ornate pedestal that holds a large bowl in the shape of a seashell.
