= Killing of Sayed Faisal =

2023 police shooting in Cambridge, Massachusetts

Shooting of Sayed Faisal
- Location: Cambridge, Massachusetts, U.S.
- Date: January 4, 2023; 3 years ago
- Attack type: Police shooting
- Deaths: 1

The killing of Sayed Faisal was a 2023 police shooting in Cambridge, Massachusetts, United States. On January 4, 2023, Sayed Faisal, a 20-year-old Bangladeshi American student at the University of Massachusetts Boston, was shot and killed by Cambridge Police Department officer Liam McMahon. Cambridge police had responded to a report alleging that Faisal had jumped out of an apartment window with a knife.

== Events ==
=== Police version ===
Police allege that after a foot chase, Faisal moved towards officers with a knife. After one officer–Robert Colbert–shot Faisal with a sponge round that didn't stop him, McMahon shot him.

== Backlash ==
The Cambridge Police Department was criticized by counter-protesters for the killing as an alleged act of police brutality. Counter-protesters and Faisal's family also called the explanation given by police into question, calling for more transparency and police reformation.

== Legal case ==
On October 5, 2023, a Massachusetts judge ruled that the Cambridge police officer who shot Faisal would not be prosecuted and that the shooting was justified.

== People involved ==
- Sayed Faisal, 20-year-old student attending the University of Massachusetts Boston.
- Liam McMahon, police officer working within the Cambridge Police Department since 2015.
- Robert Colbert, police officer.
