= Bigelow Street Historic District =

Historic district in Massachusetts, United States

- U.S. National Register of Historic Places
- U.S. Historic district
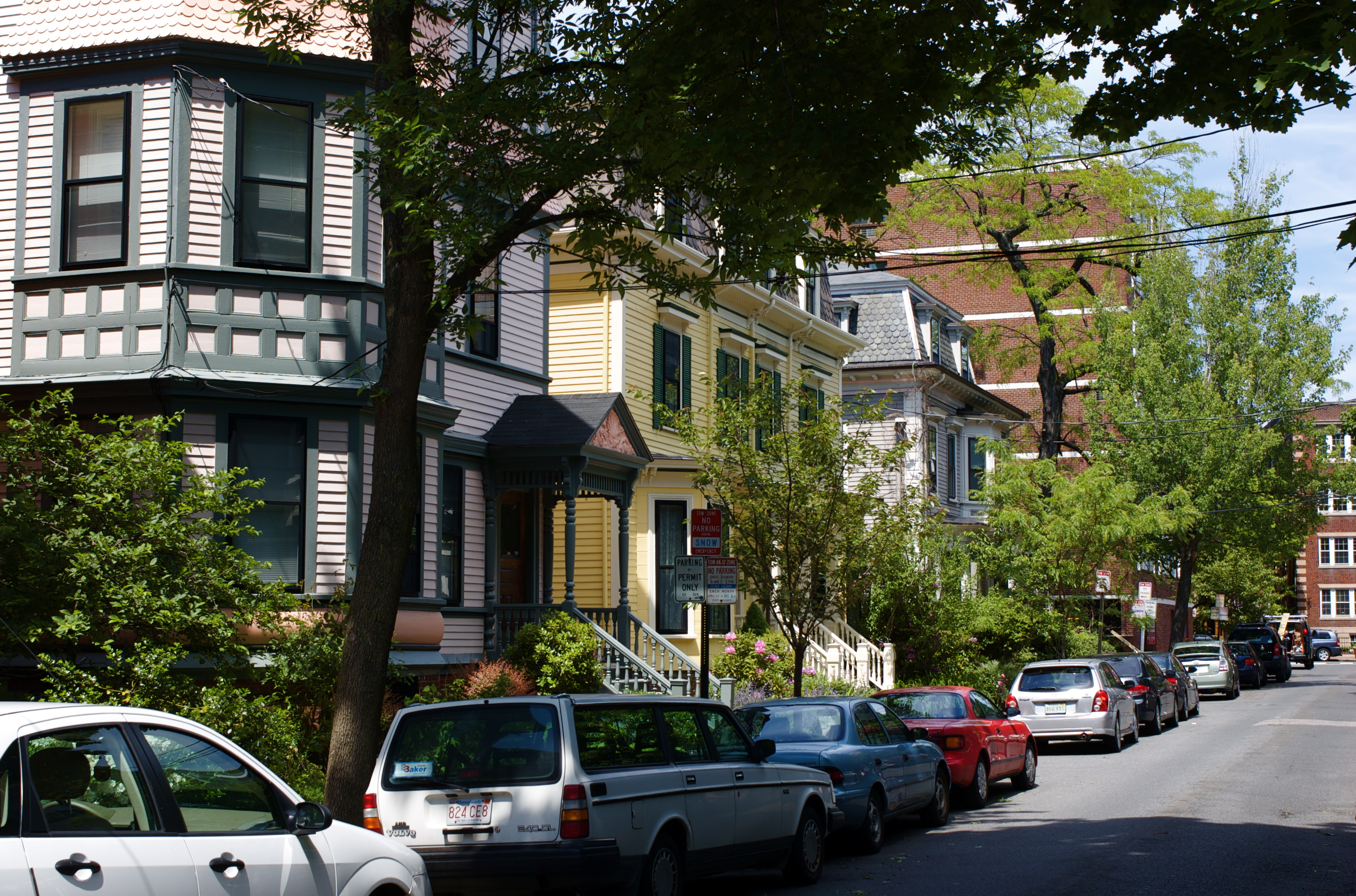

- Location within Massachusetts Location within the United States
- Location: 17–21 1/2 Inman St., 5–46 Bigelow St., Cambridge, Massachusetts
- Coordinates: 42°22′6″N 71°6′20″W
- Area: 3.5 acres (1.4 ha)
- Architectural style: Second Empire, Queen Anne
- MPS: Cambridge MRA
- NRHP reference No.: 82001922
- Added to NRHP: April 13, 1982

The Bigelow Street Historic District encompasses a uniform collection of 19th century houses on most of the length of Bigelow Street in Cambridge, Massachusetts, just northwest of Central Square. Bigelow Street was laid out in 1868, and the street was almost completely built out by 1874, resulting in a fairly uniform streetscape of Second Empire architecture. The district was added to the National Register of Historic Places in 1982.

== Description and history ==
Bigelow Street consists of one long city block, extending north from Massachusetts Avenue to Harvard Street west of Central Square. The street was laid out in 1868 by Albert Vinal, a local real estate developer. Vinal sold off the building lots to various builders, who almost completely built the street out by 1874. The resulting streetscape, which extends to include a portion of the adjacent block of Inman Street, is somewhat uniform in terms of scale and setback, and consists almost entirely of housing in the Second Empire style.

The historic district extends along almost the entire block of Bigelow Street, excluding only buildings facing Harvard Street or Massachusetts Avenue at the ends, as well as two non-contributing houses near the Massachusetts Avenue end. It also includes two buildings on Inman Street, whose backs abut Bigelow Street properties. Most of the buildings are wood-frame single-family structures with mansard roofs; one is a triple decker, three are duplexes, and there are two brick rowhouses, also with mansard roofs. One particularly elaborate house is that at 6 Bigelow Street, which features paired porch columns with ornate capitals; it was built for the treasurer of a local collar manufacturer.

== See also ==
- National Register of Historic Places listings in Cambridge, Massachusetts
