= St. Mary Orthodox Church (Cambridge, Massachusetts) =

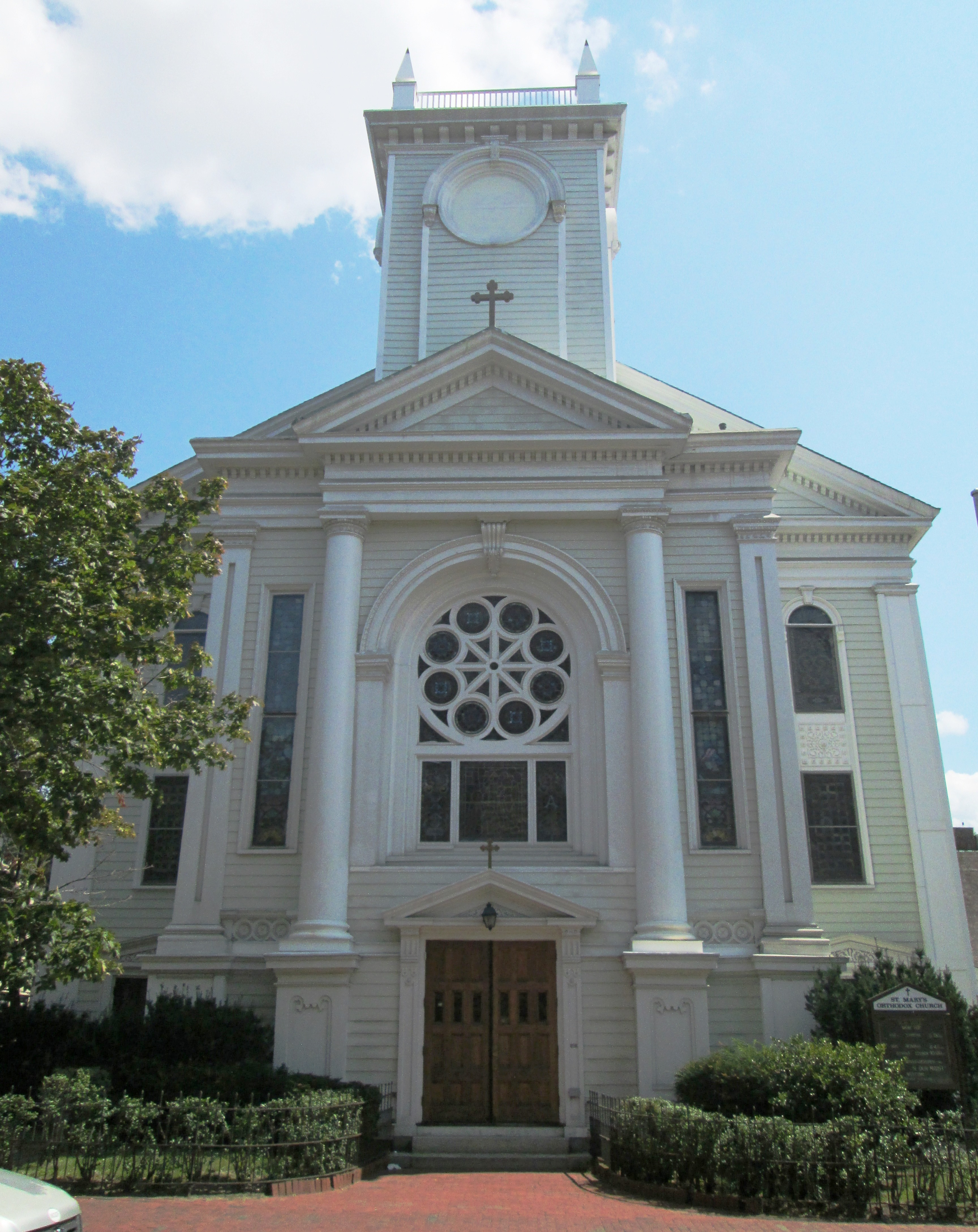
- Saint Mary Antiochian Orthodox Christian Church in Cambridge, Massachusetts.
- Language: English
- Origin: 1928 by Archbishop Victor
- Members: 150 families
- Official website: http://www.stmaryorthodoxchurch.org/

St. Mary Orthodox Christian Church is a parish of the Antiochian Orthodox Christian Archdiocese of North America located in Central Square of Cambridge, Massachusetts.

St. Mary Church adheres to the teachings and practice of the Greek Orthodox Church of Antioch specifically, and Orthodox Christianity in general.

== Clergy ==
V. Rev. Fr Antony Hughes is the current Pastor of St. Mary's. Current and past clergy have included:

- V. Rev. Fr Antony Hughes (1993–present)
- Rev. Dn. Jeffrey Smith (2002–present)
- Rev. Dn. James Wilcox (2021–present)
- Fr. Alexis Kouri (1989–1993)
- Fr. Gregory Phelan (1981–1989)
- Fr. George Shaheen (?)
- Fr. Paul O'Callahan (?)
- Fr. Demetri Khoury (1977)
- Fr. Anthony Sakey (1976–1977)
- Fr. David Buss (1976)
- Fr. Athanasius Emmert (1974–1976)
- Fr. Nicholas Steele (1971–1974)
- Father John vonHolzhausen (1945–1971)
- Very Reverend Alexander Deebeh (?)
- Right Reverend Basilios Abousaffie (?)
- Right Reverend Hannanias Kassab (?)
- Fr. Gabriel Barrow (?)
- Fr. Mahfouz (1928–?)
- Archbishop Victor, founder (1928)
