= City Hall Historic District =

City Hall Historic District may refer to:

- City Hall Historic District (Cambridge, Massachusetts)
- City Hall Historic District (Lowell, Massachusetts)
- City Hall Historic District (Battle Creek, Michigan), listed on the National Register of Historic Places in Calhoun County, Michigan
- City Hall Historic District (Rochester, New York)
