= Maria Reidelbach =

American art historian

- Known for: Social practice art, interdisciplinary art, writing, local food activism
- Style: Interactive, public art
- Movement: Social practice art

Maria Reidelbach is an American local food activist who engages in social practice, interdisciplinary art and writing. Her current work is focused on food and agriculture in the Mid-Hudson Valley. Current projects include Stick to Local Farms, an interactive map featuring local farms, The Yardavore, a column about eating locally foraged and cultivated food, and the Stick to Local Farms Cookbook: Hudson Valley.

== Practice ==
Since 2003, Reidelbach has focused on interactive art and writing that engages the public. Past projects include Goofy Garden Golf, Homegrown Mini-Golf, the world's largest garden gnome and Valley of the Giants, a community plan.

As an artist, she cultivates an "interaction of art and life," bringing people together in public art projects, sometimes involving found objects and donations of materials, along with recycled items collected by dumpster diving through lower Manhattan.

Stick to Local Farms comprises an annual map to over two dozen farms in the Rondout Valley for which Reidelbach has created art stickers; participants tour the farms and collect the stickers, having adventures and earning awards.

== Previous work ==
Reidelbach assisted sculptor Milo Mottola to create the Totally Kid Carousel, an award-winning public artwork and amusement ride at Riverbank State Park (at 145th Street and Riverside Drive), facing the Hudson River. Displaying a menagerie of full-scale carousel figures designed in collaboration with neighborhood children, the carousel received the 1996 Award for Excellence in Design from the Art Commission of the City of New York.

In 1991, Reidelbach wrote the definitive history of Mad, the bestselling Completely Mad: A History of the Comic Book and Magazine (Little, Brown), ranked by Library Journal as "essential for pop culture collections."

In 1985, at New York's Guggenheim Museum, she organized an exhibition on the eccentric visionary painter Alfred Jensen. Garnering favorable reviews, her art exhibitions and gallery shows have often displayed unusual subjects (art revealing the subjectivity of science, editorial cartoons, architect-designed furniture, Victorian underwear).

== Miniature golf ==
Fascinated with mom-and-pop culture, Reidelbach co-authored Miniature Golf (Abbeville Press, 1987), the only book ever bound in artificial turf, and in 2004, she teamed with the artist Ken Brown to create Goofy Garden Golf, a decorative miniature golf course at Pier 2 (west of North Moore Street) in Manhattan's Hudson River Park. Goofy Garden Golf was planned as a tribute to Frieda Carter, who designed the first miniature golf course at Lookout Mountain, Tennessee, in 1928.

Her 2006 project, Homegrown Mini-Golf, was landscaped entirely in edible plant, annotated with information about their biology, history and edibility. As a "roadside lure", she created Chomsky, the world's tallest garden gnome (13 feet and six inches high), as acknowledged by Guinness World Records. The project was designed to celebrate local agriculture, and is sited on Kelder's Farm, a 200 year old fruit and vegetable farm. The popular giant gnome and roadside attraction has become a permanent part of the family's agritourist business.

== Completely Mad ==
Her bestselling Completely Mad: A History of the Comic Book and Magazine (Little, Brown) was a 1991 selection of the Quality Paperback Book Club. For that comprehensive study, she interviewed many cartoonists, and Bill Gaines, publisher of Mad and EC Comics, gave her total access to his magazine's internal correspondence and filing cabinets. Speaking at the memorial service for Gaines in the Time Warner building on June 5, 1992, she described her research:

I knew Bill for only four years, but in that time I came to know him well. When I began to write the history of Mad, I had every intention of maintaining a professional distance, but I hadn't counted on the steamroller that was Bill's personality. When my mother became ill soon after I'd begun to work and I had to return to my hometown to care for her, Bill called regularly to see how she was and to see how I was. And his calls lifted the spirits of everyone in the house. My reserve developed a crack. Then I was invited to join the Mad trip, this one to Germany and Switzerland. A research goldmine for me; all the Madmen would be in one place. They would be a captive audience. During the trip Bill mostly stayed in his room, sitting in his underwear reading mystery novels. It was pretty hard to be professional while chatting with the hulking half-clad man boisterously laughing.

Publishers Weekly reviewed:

Although basically celebratory and uncritical, art historian Reidelbach's detailed history of Mad mentions recent criticisms of sexist and homophobic material in the magazine as well as Mad's (and the comics industry's) contested policies on the ownership of commissioned artwork. Most amusing are descriptions of Gaines – who continues to run the profitable magazine as a 'benevolent dictatorship' – and his idiosyncratic management theories.

== See also ==
- Mad magazine

== Sources ==
- Tribeca Trib: "Miniature Golf Course Makeover Starts with Dumpster Dive"
- Downtown Express "A little green and garbage to spruce up course"
