= Carl Barron Plaza =

Plaza in Cambridge, Massachusetts, US

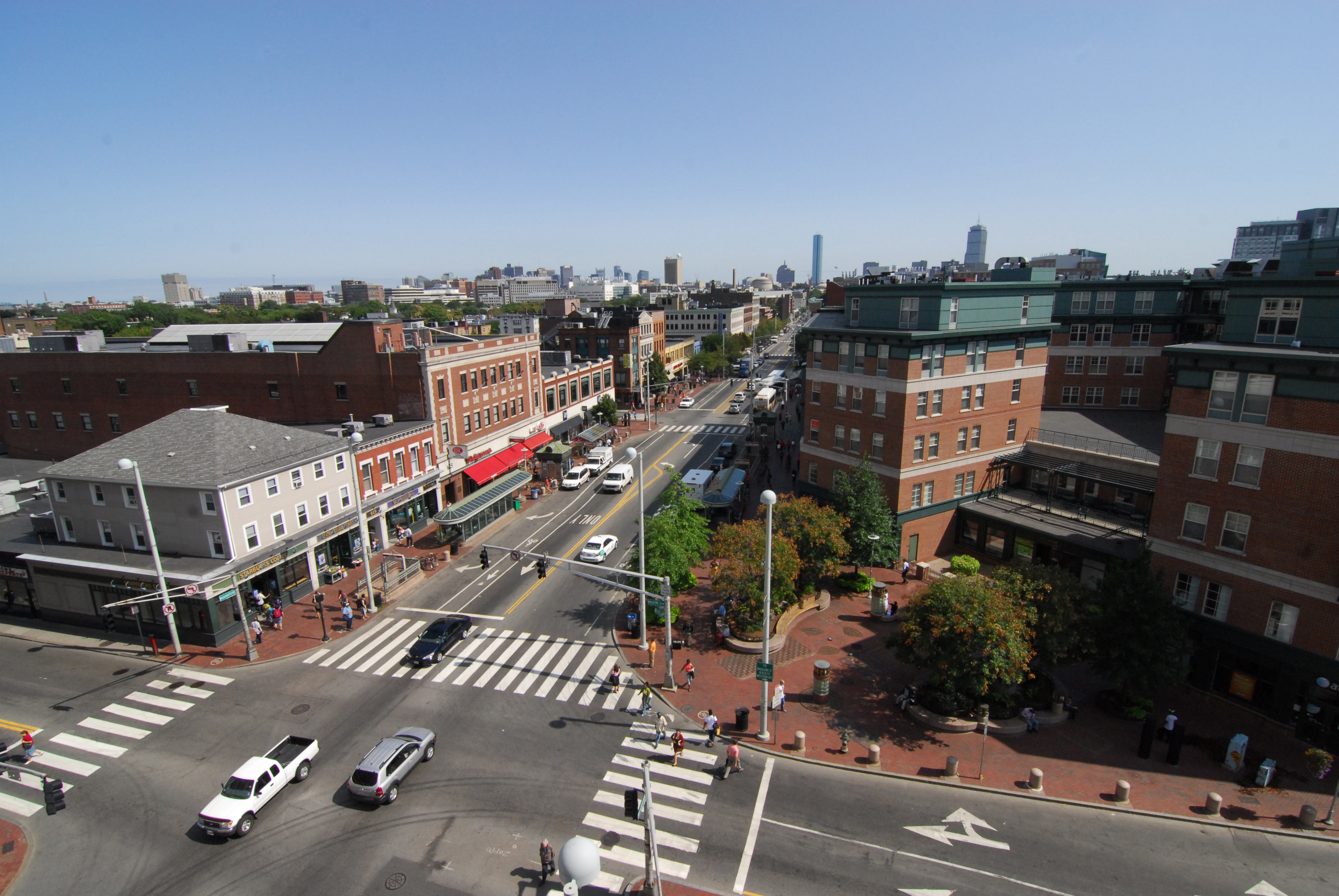
- The plaza at Massachusetts and Western Avenues in Central Square, Cambridge, in 2008

- Location within Boston
- Namesake: Carl Barron
- Type: Plaza
- Location: Cambridge, Massachusetts, U.S.
- Coordinates: 42.36538°N 71.10404°W

Construction
- Inauguration: Late 1980s

Carl Barron Plaza is a plaza in Cambridge, Massachusetts, United States. The space is named after Carl Barron, who has been described as "a Central Square icon" and "a fixture in Cambridge". His office was located near the plaza.

== Description ==
The plaza is located at Massachusetts Avenue and Western Avenue in Central Square, Cambridge. In 2019, Boston magazine's Megan Johnson described the plaza as "a place where transient folks often congregate", and noted the presence of a Cambridge Police Department (CPD) reporting station on site. Ritsuko Taho's 1997 sculpture Multicultural Manifestoes "reveals the inner hopes of Cantabrigians of all ages and backgrounds".

== History ==
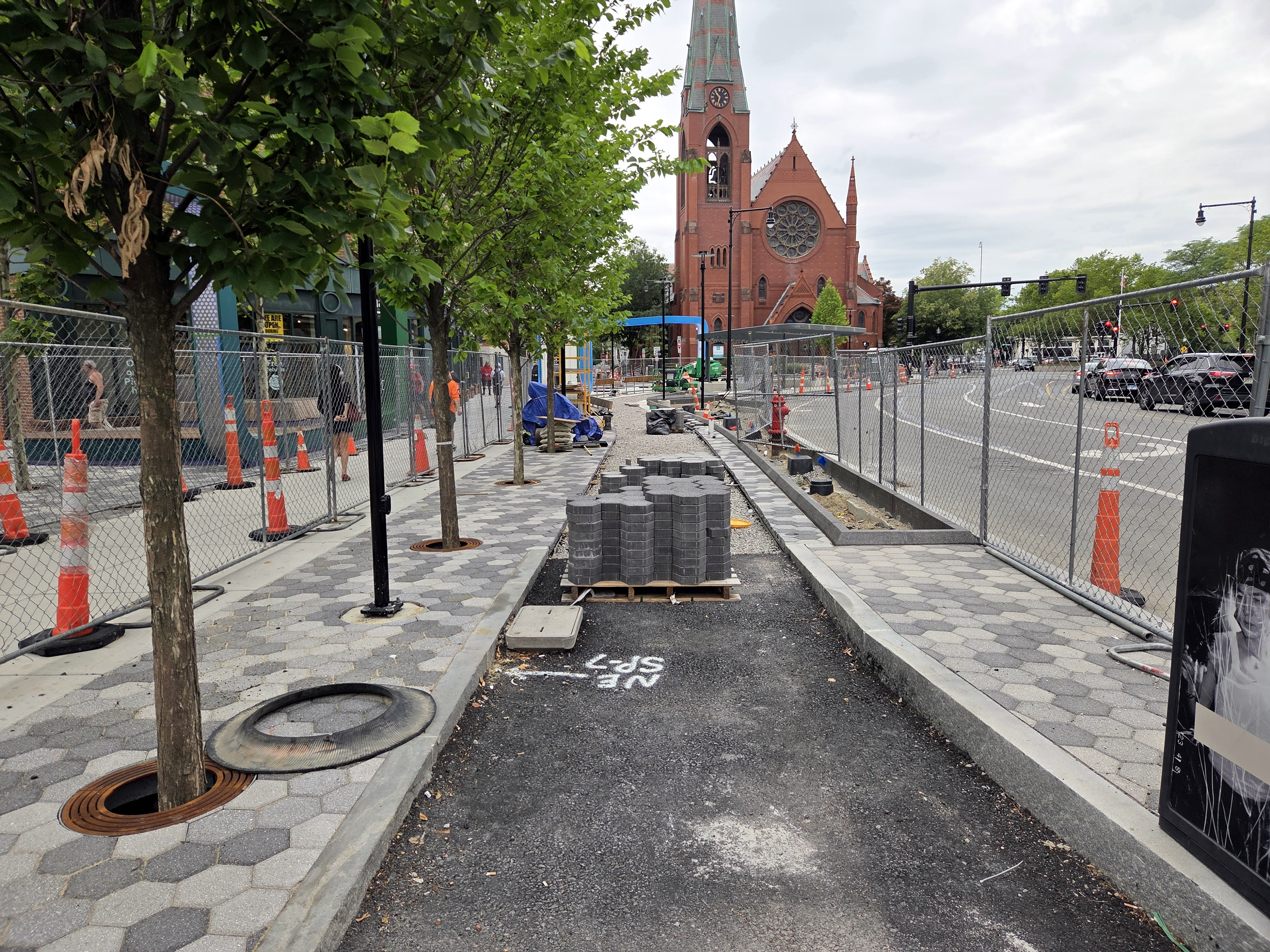
Reconstruction work in 2026

The space was dedicated during the late 1980s. In 2014, Marc Levy of Cambridge Day wrote, "In an official December 2011 red ribbon report on the square, the plaza and the people most frequently found there were identified as making new residents 'uncomfortable'", despite the presence of benches and art welcoming visitors in various languages. City Council supported a pilot program to bring performers and pushcarts to the plaza. The program received input from the Arts Council, Community Development Department, Department of Public Works, Inspectional Services Department, License Commission, and Police Department.

The CPD reporting station opened in December 2018. In 2019, Boston magazine's Megan Johnson said of the station's opening, "It's a move applauded by those looking for more of a police presence, and derided by others who see it as just another way of pushing out the existing population that doesn't fit into the visions of high-end real estate developers." The Central Square Business Association intends to renovate the space in 2020.
