= Clifton Merriman Post Office Building =

Historic post office in Massachusetts, US

- U.S. Post Office-Central Square
- U.S. National Register of Historic Places
- U.S. Historic district – Contributing property
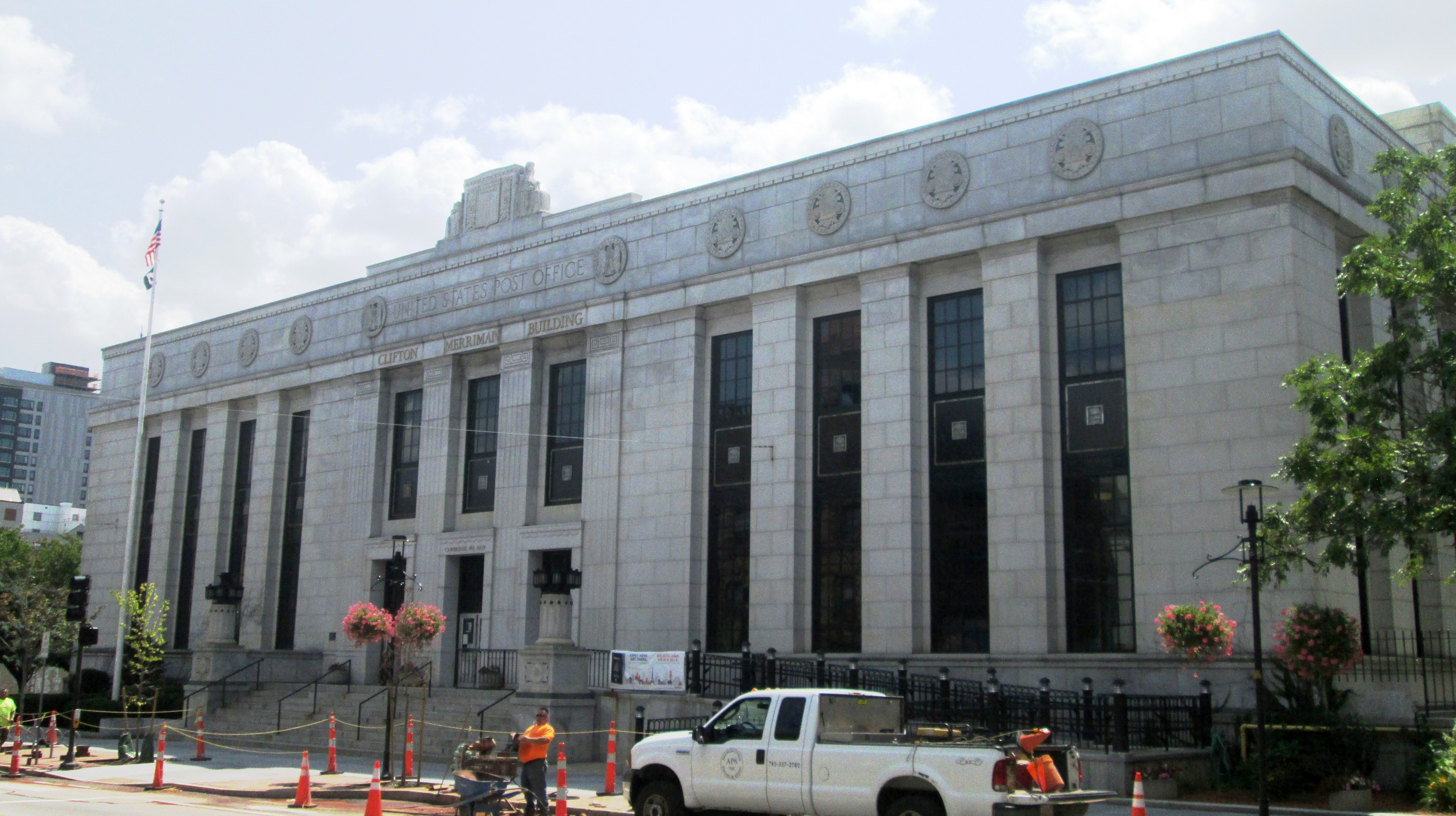
- (2017)

- Location within Massachusetts Location within the United States
- Location: Cambridge, Massachusetts
- Coordinates: 42°21′58.8″N 71°06′21.7″W
- Built: 1933
- Architect: Leland, James D., & Co.; Baven, John, Co., Inc.
- Architectural style: Classical Revival
- Part of: Central Square Historic District (ID90000128)
- NRHP reference No.: 86001343

Significant dates
- Added to NRHP: June 18, 1986
- Designated CP: February 2, 1990

The Clifton Merriman Post Office Building, also known as the U.S. Post Office-Central Square, is an historic post office at 770 Massachusetts Avenue within Central Square in Cambridge, Massachusetts.

The post office was built in 1933 and added to the National Register of Historic Places in 1986 as "U.S. Post Office-Central Square". In 1992, the United States Congress passed a bill renaming it for Clifton Merriman, an African-American World War I veteran who later became assistant superintendent of the main Post Office in Cambridge.

== See also ==
- National Register of Historic Places listings in Cambridge, Massachusetts
- List of United States post offices
