= Riverbank State Park =

State park in Manhattan, New York

Denny Farrell Riverbank State Park
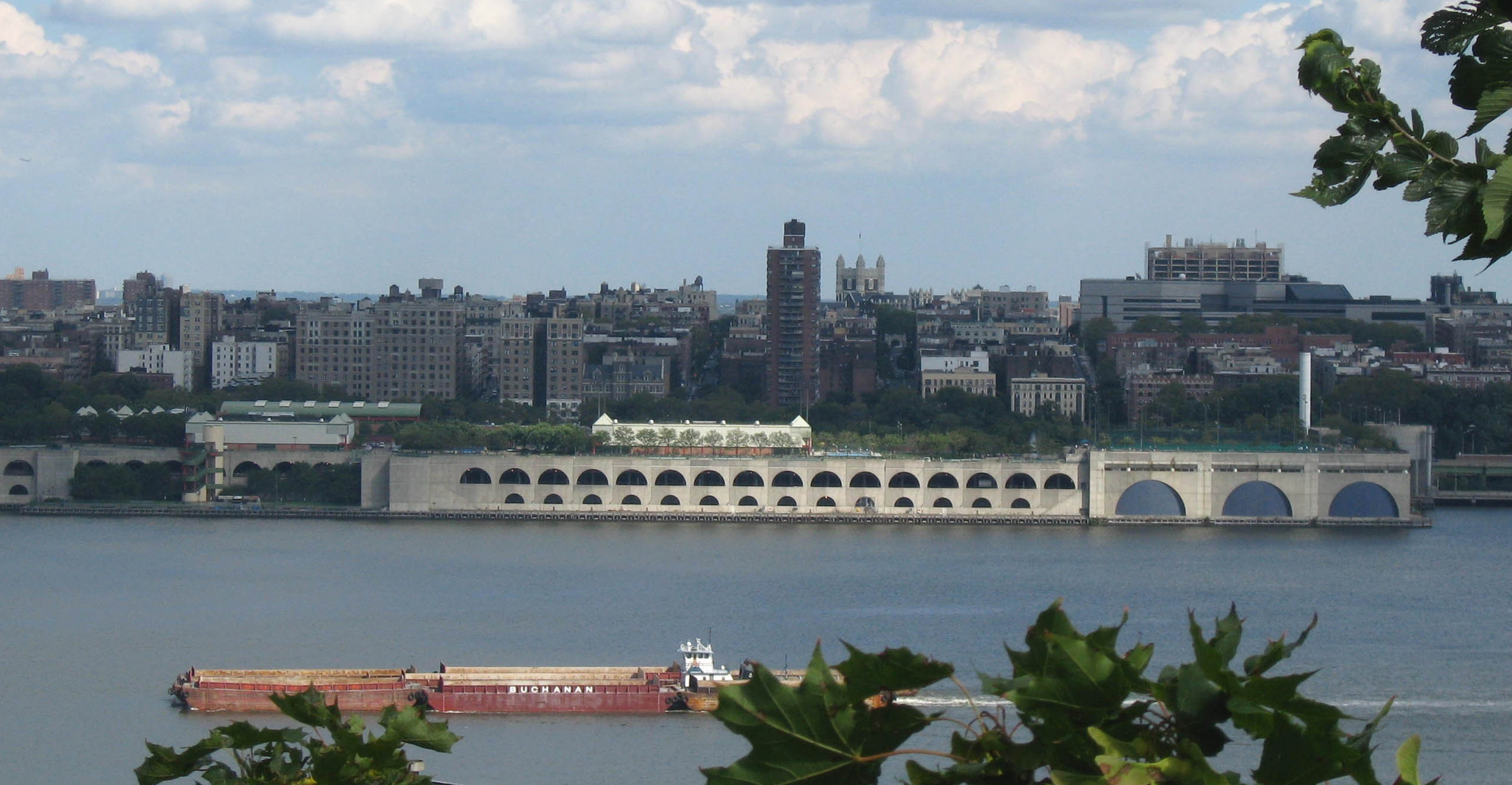
- The waste treatment plant and park as seen from across the river
- Interactive map of Denny Farrell Riverbank State Park
- Type: State park
- Location: Manhattan, New York City, NY
- Coordinates: 40°49′30″N 73°57′25″W
- Area: 28 acres (11 ha)
- Created: 1993
- Operator: New York State Office of Parks, Recreation and Historic Preservation
- Visitors: 3,817,221 (in 2024)
- Status: Open all year

Riverbank State Park is a 28-acre (11 ha) state park built on top of a sewage treatment facility on the Hudson River, in the New York City borough of Manhattan. It was opened in 1993. On September 5, 2017, it was renamed Denny Farrell Riverbank State Park, after longtime New York State Assembly member Denny Farrell who represented the surrounding area.

== Site ==
The park located on the Henry Hudson Parkway from 137th Street to 145th Street in Upper Manhattan, 69 feet (21 m) above the Hudson River. The river continues to flow under the structure. A key design consideration for the park was reducing loads to the structure below, so lightweight construction techniques were used wherever possible.

== History ==
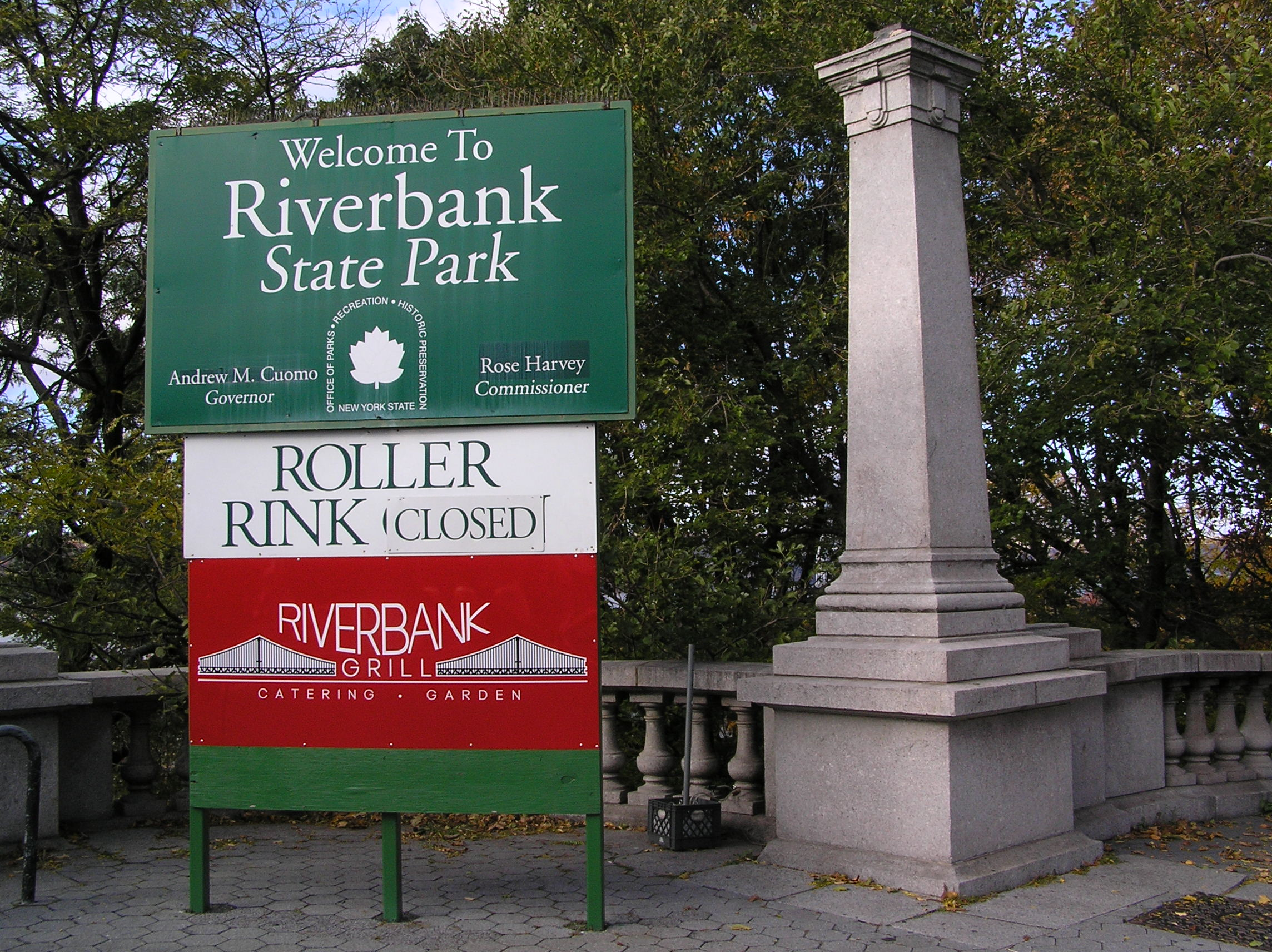
Welcome sign at Riverbank State Park

Riverbank State Park was designed by Dattner Architects and Abel Bainnson Butz Landscape Architects and opened May 27, 1993. The original idea for a park atop the sewage plant was Philip Johnson's, who proposed a series of decorative fountains and a reflecting pool.

Community opposition forced further proposals for a park design that was useful to the surrounding community. Gruzen Architects made a design proposal in 1969, and Bond Ryder/Lawrence Halprin made another proposal in 1973–1975. Some iterations of the design included fully decking over the West Side Highway to create a continuous park. All of these designs were unfeasible, however, due to cost. Dattner Architects was formally selected in 1980 for the project, after a series of community engagements 1978–1980. leading to a design phase 1980–1988. Some aspects of the plan had to be simplified due to a 13% budget cut in 1989. The design was inspired by Japanese rooftop facilities, where a similar concept was used for Ochiai Water Reclamation Center and Ochiai Chuo Park.

=== North River Wastewater Treatment Plant ===
The park was built over the North River Wastewater Treatment Plant, which processes 125 million US gallons (470,000 m^{3}) of wastewater every day during dry weather, and is designed to handle up to 340 million US gallons (1,300,000 m^{3}) a day when the weather is wet. In order to minimize odors emitted by the plant, dedicated odor-control facilities have been installed at the plant, including $55 million in recent upgrades. The plant sits on 2,300 caissons pinned into bedrock up to 230 feet (70 m) beneath the river. Construction of the foundation was completed in 1978, and the wastewater treatment facilities were constructed in two phases between 1986 and 1991.

== Facilities ==
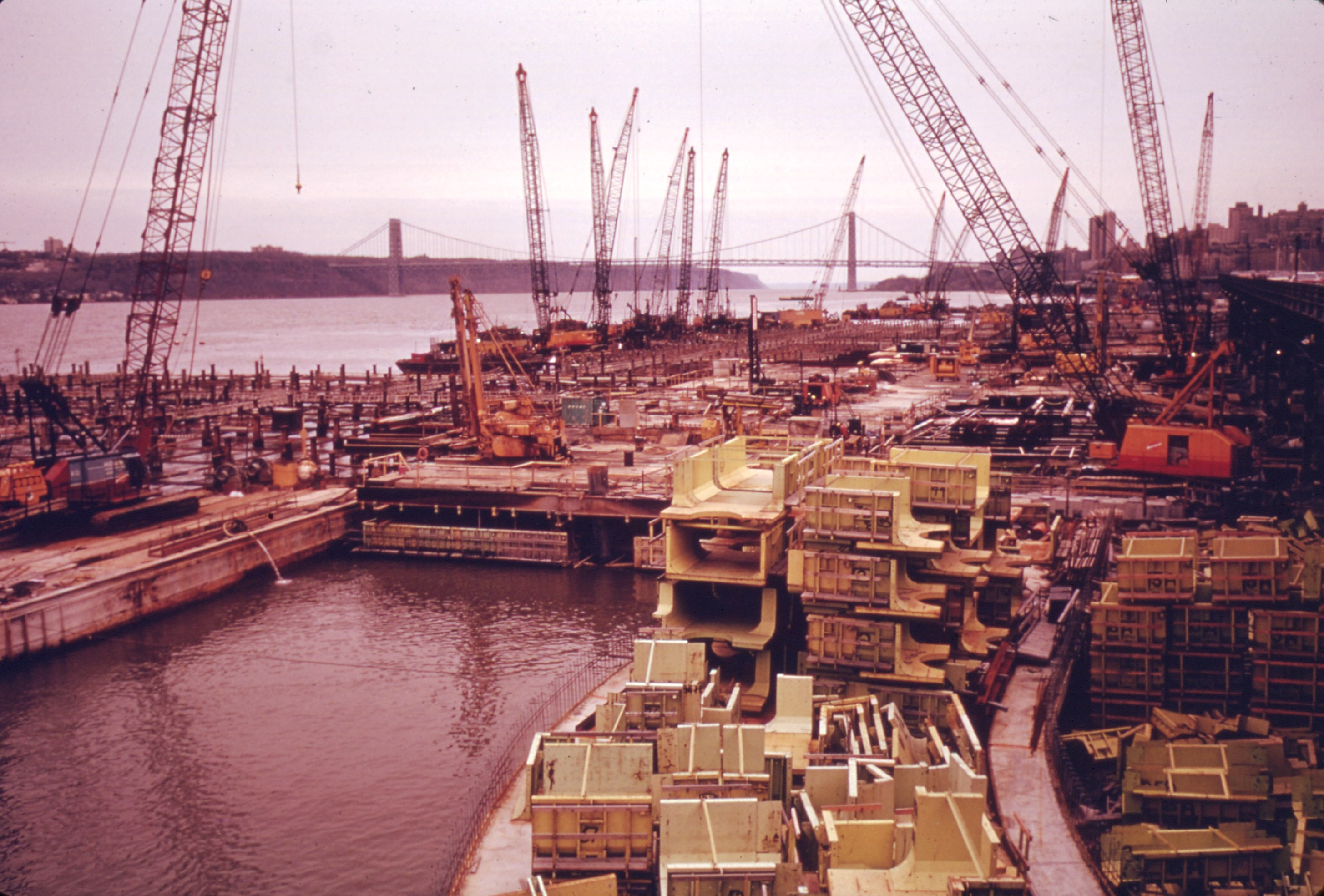
Under construction, 1973

One of only three state parks within Manhattan (the others being Hudson River Park and Franklin D. Roosevelt Four Freedoms Park), it has become one of the most heavily used state parks in New York. The 28-acre (11 ha) site includes synthetic sport surfaces as well as several acres of "green roofs", with varying depths of soil supporting plantings and trees up to 35 feet (11 m) high. This is the largest green roof in New York City.

The park includes an Olympic-size swimming pool (home to the Riverbank Redtails swim team), a covered skating rink for roller skating in the summer and ice-skating in the winter, an 800-seat cultural theater, a 2,500-seat athletic complex with fitness room, a 400m track, a 150-seat restaurant, tennis and basketball courts, playgrounds, a baseball field, community gardens, and a horticultural learning lab. Bicycling is strictly forbidden in the park but the Hudson River Greenway passes at water level.

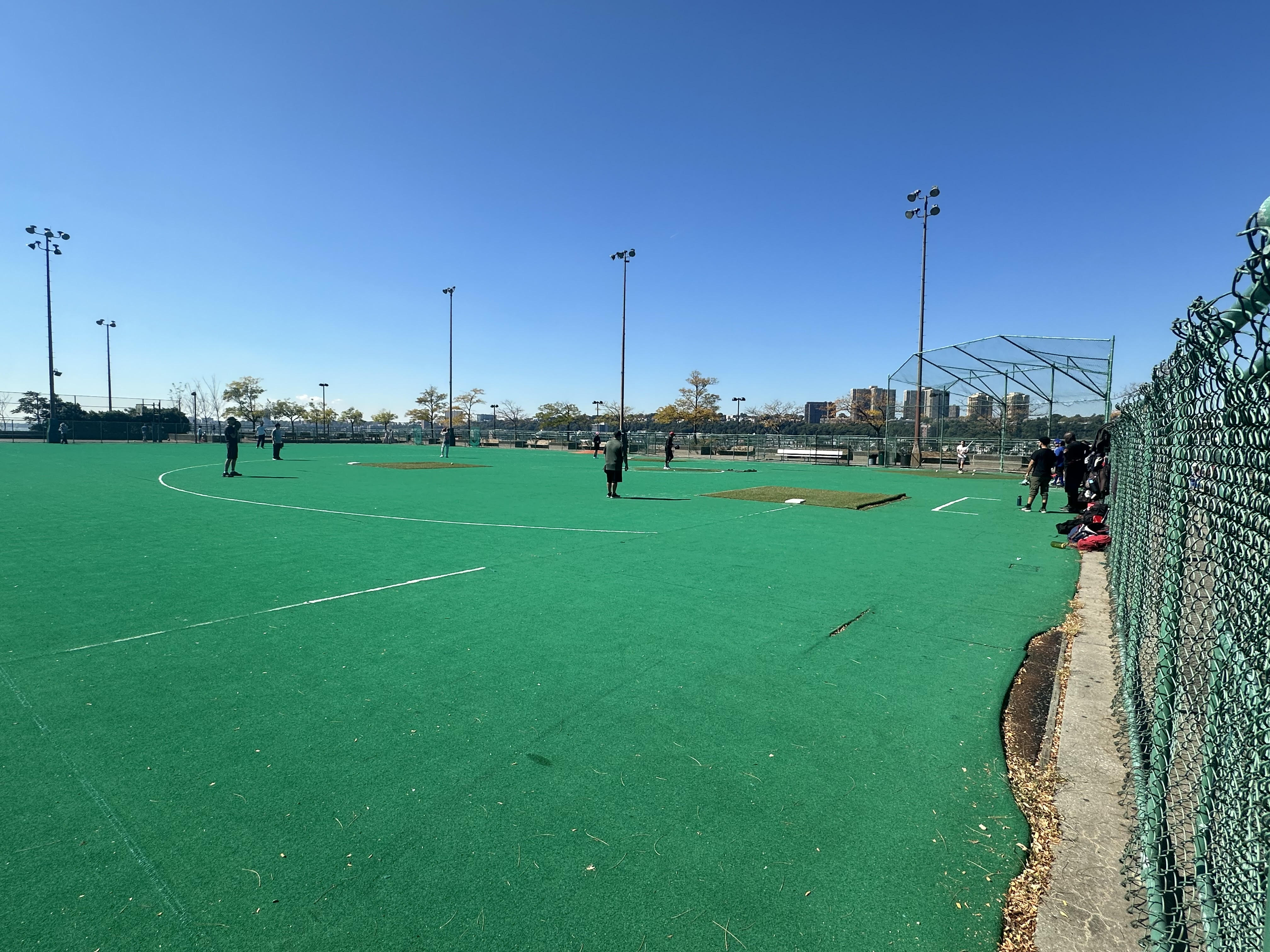
The Baseball Field at the park, in use for a Softball game.

A popular attraction is the Totally Kid Carousel created by Maria Reidelbach, Milo Mottola, and over 35 children, featuring animals designed from neighborhood children's drawings. Children whose drawings were selected received a $50 savings bond as well as free rides for life.

== See also ==
- List of New York state parks
- Paterson, David "Black, Blind, & In Charge: A Story of Visionary Leadership and Overcoming Adversity."Skyhorse Publishing. New York, New York, 2020
