= Henry Louis Gates arrest controversy =

2009 event in Massachusetts, US

Arrest of Henry Louis Gates
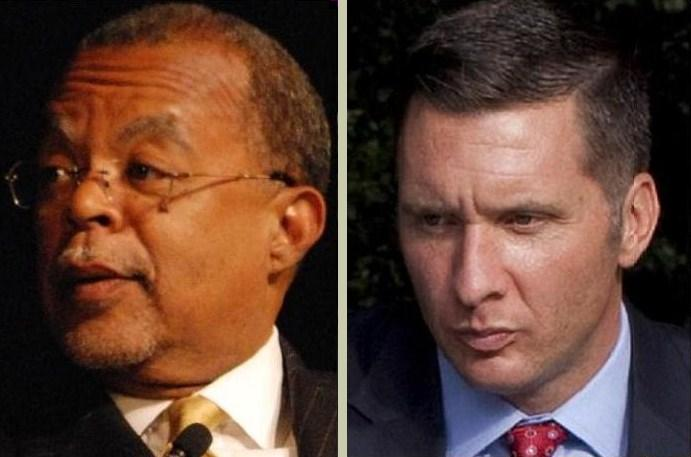
- Professor Henry Louis Gates and Sgt. James Crowley
- Date: July 16, 2009
- Location: Gates residence, Ware Street, Cambridge, Massachusetts, U.S.
- Participants: Resident Henry Louis Gates Jr. Sgt. James Crowley; Sgt. Leon Lashley; Off. Carlos Figueroa; Other unnamed officers Cambridge Police
- Outcome: Disorderly conduct charge dropped

On July 16, 2009, Harvard University professor Henry Louis "Skip" Gates Jr. was arrested at his home in Cambridge, Massachusetts, by local police officer Sgt. James Crowley, who was responding to a 911 caller's report of men breaking and entering the residence. The arrest initiated a series of events that unfolded under the spotlight of the international news media.

The arrest occurred just after Gates returned home to Cambridge after a trip to China to research the ancestry of Yo-Yo Ma for Faces of America. Gates found the front door to his home jammed shut and, with the help of his driver, tried to force it open. A local witness reported their activity to the police as a potential burglary in progress. Accounts regarding the ensuing confrontation differ, but Gates was arrested by the responding officer, Cambridge Police Sgt. James Crowley, and charged with disorderly conduct. On July 21, five days following the arrest, the charges against Gates were dropped. The arrest generated a national debate about whether or not it represented an example of racial profiling by police.

On July 22, President Barack Obama said about the incident, "I should say at the outset that Skip Gates is a friend, so I may be a little biased here. I don’t know all the facts," said Obama. "What’s been reported though, is that the guy forgot his keys, jimmied his way to get into the house, there was a report called into the police station that there might be a burglary taking place. So far so good, all right. I mean, if I was trying to jigger into — well I guess this is my house now, so it probably wouldn’t happen. But let’s say my own house in Chicago. Here I’d get shot." Speaking further, "I don't know, not having been there and not seeing all the facts, what role race played in that. But I think it's fair to say, number one, any of us would be pretty angry; number two, that the Cambridge police acted stupidly in arresting somebody when there was already proof that they were in their own home, and, number three, what I think we know separate and apart from this incident is that there's a long history in this country of African Americans and Latinos being stopped by law enforcement disproportionately." Law enforcement organizations and members objected to Obama's comments and criticized his handling of the issue. In the aftermath, Obama stated that he regretted his comments and hoped that the situation could become a "teachable moment".

On July 24, Obama invited both parties to the White House to discuss the issue over a beer, and on July 30, Obama and Vice President Joe Biden joined Crowley and Gates in a private, cordial meeting in a courtyard near the White House Rose Garden; this became known colloquially as the "Beer Summit".

== Arrest ==
On July 16, 2009, Gates had just returned from a trip to China. As the front door of his home would not open, Gates entered through the back door. Once inside, he still could not open the front door. Gates later stated that the lock was damaged and speculated that someone had attempted to "jimmy" it. Gates went back outside and, with help from his driver, forced the door open. Since the house is university-owned, he then reported the problem to Harvard's maintenance department.

After Gates's driver left, the Cambridge police arrived, alerted by the 911 call of a neighbor. There are multiple published accounts of the subsequent events which led to the arrest of Gates, including the police report, interviews with Sgt. Crowley and other officers on the scene; and published interviews with Gates and Lucia Whalen.

=== Police report and 911 dispatcher recordings ===
Gates, arrested on the porch of his Cambridge home, with Sgt. Crowley (right) and Sgt. Lashley (foreground).

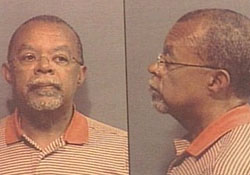
Gates's booking photo taken the day of the arrest.

According to the police report, Sergeant Crowley arrived at the scene, went up to the front door, and asked Gates to step outside. Crowley explained he was investigating the report of a break-in in progress; as he did so, Gates opened the front door and said, "Why, because I'm a black man in America?"

Crowley's report states that he believed Gates was lawfully in the residence, but that he was surprised and confused by Gates's behavior, which included a threat that Crowley did not know who he was "messing with." Crowley then asked Gates for a photo ID so as to verify he was the resident of the house. Gates initially refused, but then supplied his Harvard University identification card. Crowley wrote that Gates repeatedly shouted requests for his police identification. Crowley then told Gates that he was leaving his residence and that if Gates wanted to continue discussing the matter, he would speak to him outside. Gates replied, "Yeah, I'll speak with your mama outside." On the 911 dispatcher audio recordings, a man's loud voice is heard in the background at several points during Sgt. Crowley's transmissions.

Gates stepped onto his front porch and continued to yell at Crowley, accusing him of racial bias and saying he had not heard the last of him. Faced with this behavior from Gates, who was still standing on his own front porch, Crowley warned Gates that he was becoming disorderly. When Gates ignored this warning and persisted in his behavior, and likewise ignored a second warning from Crowley, Crowley informed him that he was under arrest.

=== Gates's accounts ===
Gates's account of the events first appeared in The Root on July 20. According to the statement, Gates saw Crowley at the door as he was speaking to the Harvard Real Estate Office to have his front door fixed. When he opened the front door, Crowley immediately asked him to step outside. Gates did not comply and asked Crowley why he was there. When told that Crowley was a police officer investigating a reported breaking and entering, Gates replied that it was his house, and he was a Harvard faculty member. Crowley asked Gates whether he could prove it; Gates told him he could, and turned to go to the kitchen to fetch his wallet. Crowley followed him into the house. Gates then handed Crowley his Harvard University ID and a current driver's license, both including his photograph, the license also giving his address.

Gates then asked Crowley for his name and badge number, but Crowley did not respond. Following repeated requests for Crowley's name and badge number, the officer left the kitchen; Gates followed him to the front door. As he stepped out the front door and asked the other officers for Crowley's name and badge number, Crowley said, "Thank you for accommodating my earlier request," and arrested Gates on his front porch.

In an interview published in The Root on July 21, Gates said that when Crowley first asked him to step outside onto the porch, "the way he said it, I knew he wasn't canvassing for the police benevolent association. All the hairs stood up on the back of my neck, and I realized that I was in danger. And I said to him no, out of instinct. I said, 'No, I will not.' He demanded that I step out on the porch, and I don't think he would have done that if I was a white person." Gates called the references to loud and tumultuous behavior in the police report a "joke"; he had been physically incapable of yelling at the time, due to a severe bronchial infection. As he was walked to the car in handcuffs, he asked, "Is this how you treat a black man in America?" In an interview with columnist Maureen Dowd, Gates denied he had made a reference to the mother of the arresting officer.

=== Lucia Whalen ===
Lucia Whalen was the witness and original 911 caller reporting the incident. Sgt. Crowley stated in the police report that when he arrived at the scene, he spoke to Whalen, who told him she had "observed what appeared to be two black males with backpacks" trying to force entry. Whalen subsequently denied making any such comment to Crowley. Whalen was hurt by widespread comments labeling her a racist, based on the "two black males with backpacks" quote in the police report.

A recording of her 911 call was released on July 27; in it, Whalen could be heard saying, "I don't know if they live there and they just had a hard time with their key." When asked for a more detailed description by the dispatcher, her reply on the tape was, "One looked kind of Hispanic, but I'm not really sure. And the other one entered and I didn't see what he looked like at all."

=== Charges and resolution ===
Gates was held for four hours and charged with disorderly conduct. The charges were dropped five days later, on July 21, 2009, by the Middlesex County district attorney's office, upon the recommendation of the city of Cambridge and the Cambridge Police Department. A joint press release by the authorities and Professor Gates said all parties had agreed that this was "a just resolution to an unfortunate set of circumstances" and that the incident "should not be viewed as one that demeans the character and reputation of Professor Gates or the character of the Cambridge Police Department."

Sgt. Crowley said he would not apologize for his actions. He was backed up by the Cambridge Police Superior Officers Association, which released a statement saying his actions had been consistent with police training, policies and applicable legal standards.

== Response ==
The incident was first reported in The Harvard Crimson, the campus newspaper, the Monday morning after the arrest. Following a write-up by the Associated Press that afternoon, the story spread quickly. Public interest in the arrest grew when newspapers published the photograph showing a handcuffed Gates being escorted away from the front door.

A number of individuals commented on the incident in the days that followed. The Governor of Massachusetts, Deval Patrick, stated that he felt "troubled" about the situation. The Mayor of Cambridge, E. Denise Simmons, suggested that the incident was a "teachable moment" and that she hoped there would be meaningful dialogue between Mr. Gates, the police force, and the general public.

Some members of the Harvard community raised questions about racial profiling. The Reverend Al Sharpton discussed the incident and referred to it as one of "police abuse or racial profiling", calling it "outrageous" and "unbelievable." Gates argued that the police picked on him because of his race, and said that he would use the incident to raise awareness of alleged police mistreatment of blacks, suggesting that he may plan a documentary about it.

Sgt. Crowley's supporters noted he was chosen by a black police commissioner to serve as an instructor for a Lowell Police Academy course entitled "Racial Profiling", which Crowley has taught since 2004. While working as a campus police officer at Brandeis University in 1993, Crowley had tried to revive African American Boston Celtics star Reggie Lewis with mouth-to-mouth resuscitation after the latter suffered a fatal heart attack. Crowley received public support from many police officers, including African Americans, who portrayed him as a good and fair officer.

Sgt. Leon Lashley, a black officer who was present at Gates's arrest, said he supported Sgt. Crowley's actions "100 percent." Lashley added that he thought it would have gone differently, with no arrest, if he had been the first officer to arrive on the scene and the initial encounter with Gates had been "black man to black man." Another officer in the Cambridge police department said "racism is not part of it, and that is what is frustrating."

Jon Shane, who spent 17 years as a police officer in Newark, New Jersey, and is a professor of criminal justice at John Jay College of Criminal Justice who specializes in police policy and practice, told Time magazine that, had he been the responding officer, he would not have arrested Gates after identifying him. He described Gates's behavior as "contempt of cop" which officers are supposed to handle as speech protected by the First Amendment of the U.S. Constitution (cf. Cohen v. California, which affirmed a right to "offensive" speech). Tom Nolan, a criminal justice professor at Boston University who spent 27 years in uniform at the Boston Police Department, was quoted in the same article supporting an officer's use of discretion in disorderly conduct cases. Eugene O'Donnell, a professor of law and police studies at John Jay College, told the Time reporter that disorderly conduct is "probably the most abused statute in America."

David E. Frank, a senior news reporter for Massachusetts Lawyers Weekly and former prosecutor in Massachusetts, commented that, from a legal standpoint, "the decision not to prosecute certainly seems to be the correct one." In his analysis, even if the prosecution could prove all of the disputed factual allegations in Crowley's report, Massachusetts case law does not consider offensive and abusive language to be disorderly conduct per se, and they would be unlikely to prevail in court. Attorney Harvey A. Silverglate suggested that the charges were dropped because Gates would almost certainly have prevailed in court with a First Amendment defense, an outcome that would have severely curtailed future arrests for disorderly conduct in "contempt of cop" situations.

In an interview with CNN, Colin Powell, former Secretary of State and Joint Chiefs of Staff Chairman offered opinions on both sides of the incident. With regard to Gates, Powell said "I think he should have reflected on whether or not this was the time to make that big a deal". Powell recalled that he was taught as a child "not to argue with a police officer trying to do their job" and that Gates should have instead cooperated to avoid making the situation difficult, suggesting that Gates could afterwards file a complaint or lawsuit if he disagreed with the officer. With regard to Sgt. Crowley, Powell stated that: "Once they felt they had to bring Dr. Gates out of the house and to handcuff him, I would've thought at that point, some adult supervision would have stepped in and said 'OK look, it is his house. Let's not take this any further, take the handcuffs off, good night Dr. Gates."

A review conducted by the Cambridge Review Committee, which was formed by Cambridge City Manager Robert W. Healy at the recommendation of Cambridge Police Commissioner Robert Haas, concluded that the incident was avoidable, noting that "Sergeant Crowley and Professor Gates each missed opportunities to 'rachet down' the situation and end it peacefully."

Both Gates and Crowley have been active participants with the Simon Wiesenthal Center in Los Angeles. Abraham Cooper, the associate dean of the center, has invited both of them back to the center in order to "create the next real 'teaching moment' for our nation."

=== Justin Barrett e-mail ===
On July 28, it was revealed in the media that Justin Barrett, a 36-year-old Boston Police Department officer who had been on the job for two years, and is also a member of the Massachusetts National Guard, sent a mass e-mail to fellow National Guardsmen and to The Boston Globe in which he referred to Gates as a "jungle monkey." Although the email was signed only JB, when he was asked about it, Barrett admitted to his BPD superiors that he was the author. According to an article in the Boston Globe, Barrett wrote the email containing the racial slur "in reaction to media coverage of Gates's arrest July 16," in particular to a July 22 Globe column by Yvonne Abraham, who expressed support for Gates. In the e-mail, Barrett wrote, "If I was the officer he [Gates] verbally assaulted like a banana-eating jungle monkey, I would have sprayed him in the face with OC (oleorosin capsicum, or pepper spray) deserving of his belligerent non-compliance." During the course of the message, Barrett used the phrase "jungle monkey" four times, three times in reference to Gates and once in reference to Abraham's column, which he characterized as "jungle monkey gibberish."

Upon learning of the incident, Boston Police Commissioner Ed Davis immediately stripped Barrett of his badge and gun, put him on administrative leave, and scheduled a termination hearing. The Massachusetts National Guard also suspended Barrett. In reaction to the news of Barrett's conduct, Boston Mayor Thomas Menino compared the officer to a "cancer" and said he is "gone, g-o-n-e" from the Boston police force.

Barrett, in a television interview, said that he used "a poor choice of words" in the email. He added, "I did not mean to offend anyone." Barrett also stated, "I have so many friends of every type of culture and race you can name. I am not a racist." In August 2009, Barrett filed an unsuccessful suit against the Boston Police Department and the City of Boston, charging that the suspension from his duties was a violation of his civil rights. Barrett was discharged from duty on February 5, 2010. On April 26, 2010, the Department of Unemployment Assistance (DUA) denied Barrett unemployment benefits. The DUA board's decision would be affirmed or reversed four times, the last being on July 15, 2013, when the Massachusetts Appeals Court ruled that his "egregious misconduct" was "obviously intentional."

== Presidential involvement ==
=== Press conference and briefing ===
During a July 22 news conference concerning health care reform, columnist Lynn Sweet, Washington, D.C. bureau chief for the Chicago Sun-Times, asked President Barack Obama "Recently, Professor Henry Louis Gates Jr. was arrested at his home in Cambridge. What does that incident say to you? And what does it say about race relations in America?" Obama replied, "Now, I've – I don't know, not having been there and not seeing all the facts, what role race played in that. But I think it's fair to say, number one, any of us would be pretty angry; number two, that the Cambridge police acted stupidly in arresting somebody when there was already proof that they were in their own home. And number three, what I think we know separate and apart from this incident is that there is a long history in this country of African-Americans and Latinos being stopped by law enforcement disproportionately. That's just a fact." The President also acknowledged that Gates is a personal friend.

Obama's remarks sparked a reaction from law-enforcement professionals. James Preston, president of the Fraternal Order of Police Florida State Lodge, stated: "To make such an off-handed comment about a subject without benefit of the facts, in such a public forum, hurts police/community relations and is a setback to all of the years of progress." Preston further warned that "by reducing all contact between law enforcement and the public to the color of their skin or ethnicity is, in fact, counter-productive to improving relationships." In addition, the Cambridge police commissioner, describing the impact of the accusations, commented that "this department is deeply pained. It takes its professional pride seriously". On July 24, 2009, a multiracial group of police officers demanded an apology from President Obama and Governor Deval Patrick for making comments which the police described as insulting. Republican congressman Thaddeus McCotter said he would introduce a resolution in the House of Representatives calling on the president to apologize to Crowley. An opinion poll released by Pew Research found that 41 percent disapproved of Obama's "handling of the situation," while only 29 percent approved, and support from white voters dropped from 53 percent to 46 percent. Years later, in his memoir A Promised Land, Obama wrote that according to the White House's polling, the incident caused a larger drop in white support for his presidency than any other single event.

Congressman Steve King drew unfavorable attention to himself when he remarked, during a radio interview, that "The president has demonstrated that he has a default mechanism in him that breaks down the side of race that favors the black person, in the case of Professor Gates and Officer (James) Crowley."

President Obama appeared unannounced at a White House press briefing on July 24, and said, "I want to make clear that in my choice of words I think I unfortunately gave an impression that I was maligning the Cambridge Police Department or Sergeant Crowley specifically – and I could have calibrated those words differently." Also, that "I continue to believe, based on what I have heard, that there was an overreaction in pulling Professor Gates out of his home to the station. I also continue to believe, based on what I heard, that Professor Gates probably overreacted as well."

=== "Beer Summit" ===
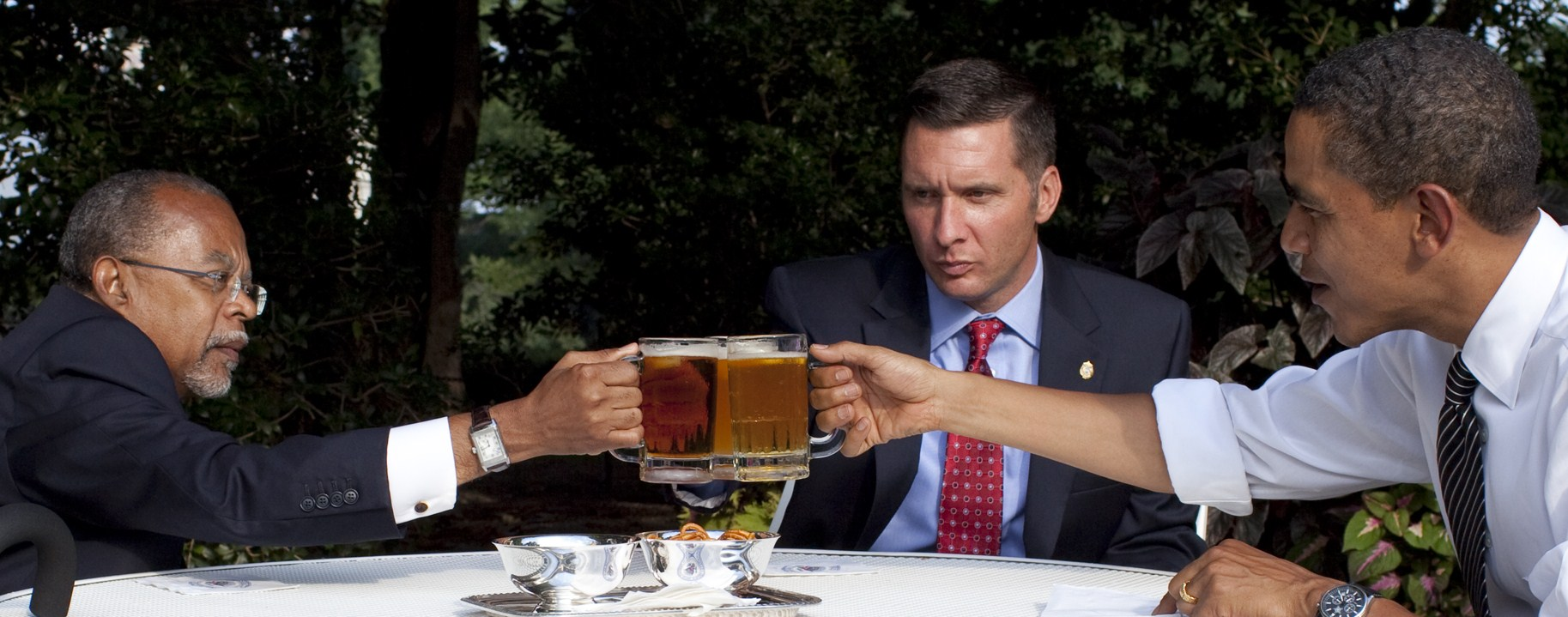
"Beer Summit" at the White House, July 30, 2009; from left to right: Gates, Crowley and Obama (prior to Vice President Joe Biden's arrival)

President Obama called both men on July 24, and invited them to the White House to discuss the situation over beers. Both men accepted the offer. Upon accepting, Gates stated in an email to The Boston Globe that "My entire academic career has been based on improving race relations, not exacerbating them. I am hopeful that my experience will lead to greater sensitivity to issues of racial profiling in the criminal justice system."

One of Gates's lawyers, Harvard Law Professor Charles Ogletree, a former professor of Obama's, stated that "I think the president has taken the right approach by trying to make sure we move forward [...] He's always had the ability to negotiate difficult conversations, and his steps today are an important step in the right direction. I think the president has given his assessment, which makes a lot of sense, and, however you feel about it, it has reduced the temperature and allowed everyone to move forward in a constructive way." Ogletree has since written a book about the case. Steve Killion, president of the Cambridge patrol officers association, also stated "I'm absolutely pleased with [Obama's call]. I think it was a good thing for the president to do. .... We all want to see this behind us."

On July 30, Obama, Vice President Joe Biden, Gates, and Crowley met at the White House. Initially the Gates and Crowley families were given separate tours of the White House. The families then continued their tours together while the principals had a friendly conversation over beer.^{[A]} Crowley and Gates told Obama that they had already planned to meet again soon for lunch. Obama said he believed "what brings us together is stronger than what pulls us apart" and that after the meeting he was "hopeful that all of us are able to draw this positive lesson from this episode."

Both Crowley and Gates issued post-meeting statements. Crowley commented that he and Gates discussed the topic "like two gentlemen, instead of fighting it out either in the physical sense or in the mental sense, in the court of public opinion." Gates commented that he hoped "that this experience will prove an occasion for education, not recrimination. I know that Sergeant Crowley shares this goal." In an interview with The New York Times, Gates further commented on the meeting, "I don't think anybody but Barack Obama would have thought about bringing us together [...] the president was great – he was very wise, very sage, very Solomonic." When asked for his impression of Crowley, Gates joked: "We hit it off right from the very beginning [...] when he's not arresting you, Sergeant Crowley is a really likable guy."

== Relations with Crowley since the incident ==
During an appearance on The Oprah Winfrey Show, Gates stated that relations between him and Crowley are amicable. He also revealed that he asked Crowley for a sample of his DNA, and that he and Crowley are distant cousins and share a common Irish ancestor. On the show, Gates stated that Crowley recently gave him the handcuffs used in the arrest. When asked what he would do with the handcuffs, Gates stated that he plans to donate them to the Smithsonian's National Museum of African American History and Culture, where they now reside.

Gates later revealed during a National Press Club luncheon that he had met with Crowley for a beer prior to the Beer Summit at the suggestion of President Bill Clinton. Gates said that he was moved when Crowley told him "Professor, all I wanted was to go home to my wife at the end of the day." Gates further recounted that Crowley had feared that another black man had been upstairs who could at any moment have come down and killed him. Gates said this brought tears to his eyes as he "understands fear" and that ever since he and Crowley have been friends.

== Notes ==
a. Obama had a Bud Light, Crowley had a Blue Moon, Gates had a Sam Adams Light and Biden, who does not drink alcohol, had a Buckler. Some local brewers had lobbied for a Boston-based beer to be served; Obama is generally said to prefer Budweiser.
