= City Hall (Cambridge, Massachusetts) =

City hall building in Massachusetts, United States

Coordinates: 42.36712°N 71.10563°W

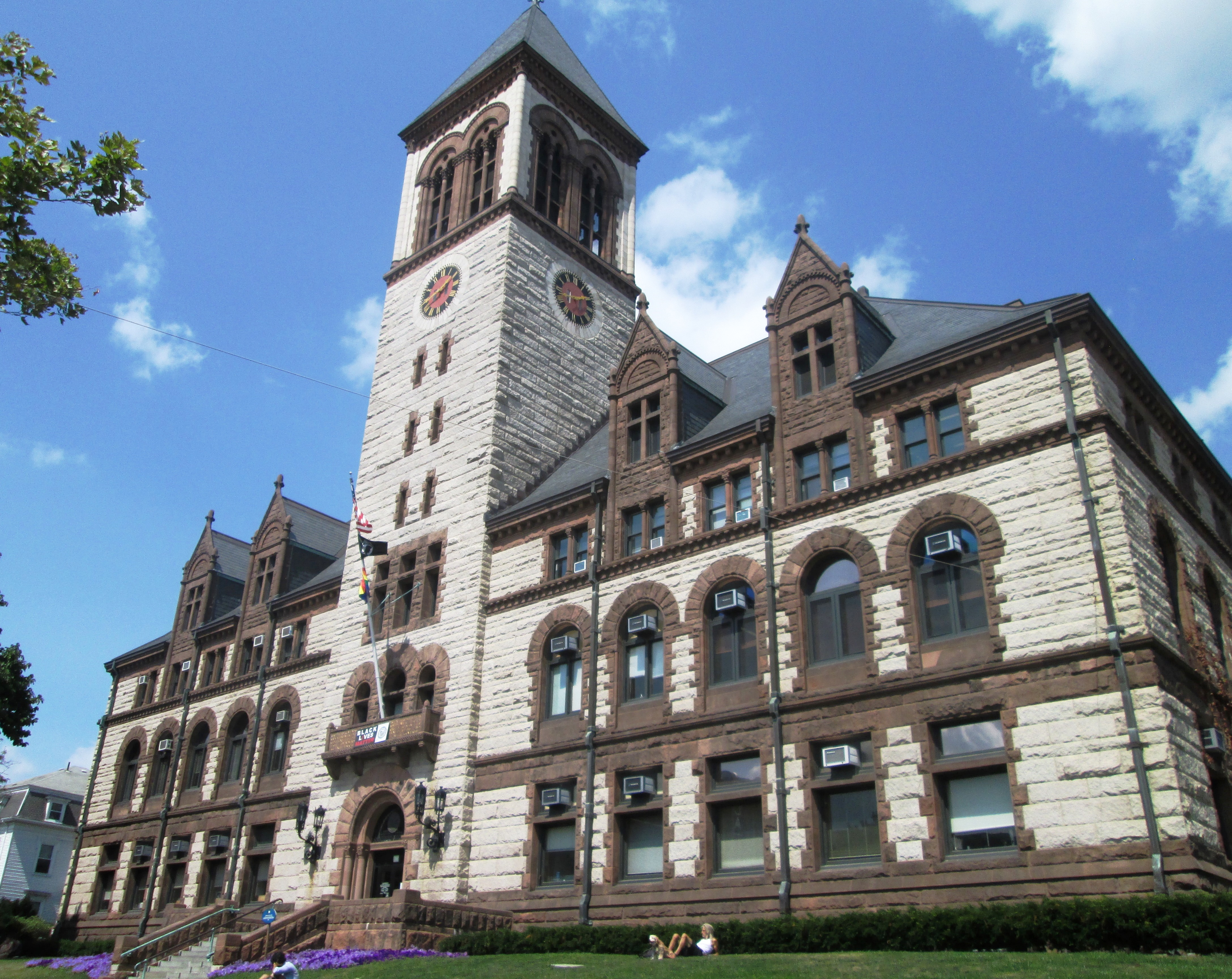
The building in 2017.

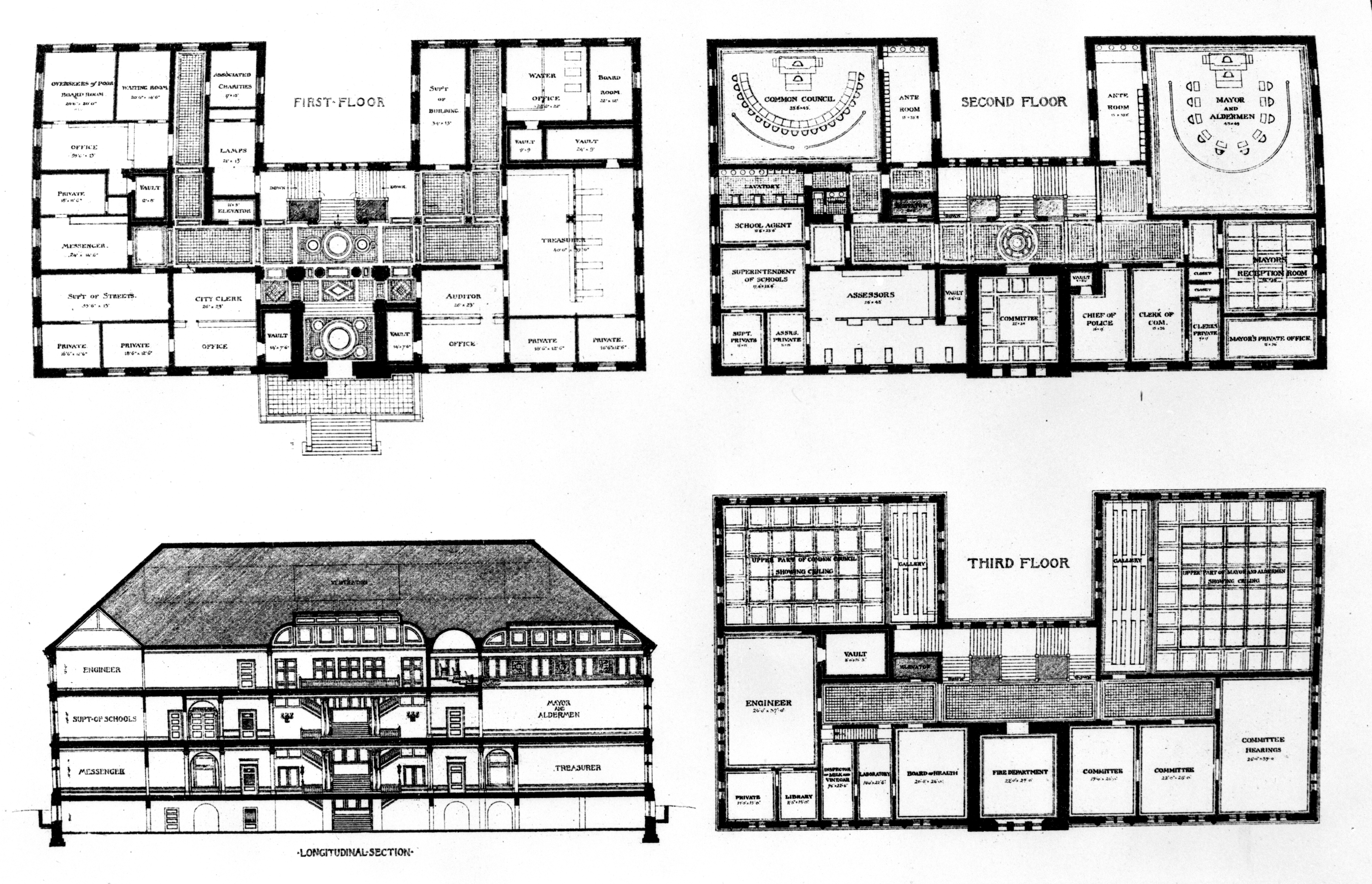
Section and floor plans.

The Cambridge, Massachusetts City Hall is the city hall for Cambridge, Massachusetts, located at 795 Massachusetts Avenue, and built in the Richardsonian Romanesque style. The building additionally serves as a centerpiece of the surrounding City Hall Historic District and adjacent Central Square Historic District.

== History ==
The hall was built between 1888 and 1889, and was largely funded through a donation from Frederick Hastings Rindge. The architects were Longfellow, Alden & Harlow (Alexander Wadsworth Longfellow Jr., 1854–1934; Frank E. Alden, 1859–1908; and Alfred B. Harlow, 1857–1927). The building is three stories tall, with a bell tower that rises to 158 feet. Load-bearing stone walls are of Milford granite trimmed with Longmeadow brownstone.

Cambridge City Hall houses offices for the city council, the city manager and several municipal departments. In addition to the main building, the city of Cambridge also houses several other departments a couple of city blocks away in the City Hall Annex, located at Broadway and Inman Street.

On May 17, 2004, shortly after midnight, the first legal applications in the United States for marriage licenses for same-sex couples were issued at Cambridge City Hall. At 9:15 a.m. that day, the Cambridge City C=clerk began solemnizing same-sex marriages.
