= Ken Brown (filmmaker) =

American artist and filmmaker

Ken Brown's Parable of the Pie

Ken Brown (born March 12, 1944, Dayton, Ohio) is an American filmmaker, photographer, cartoonist, and designer. He grew up in Amherst, Massachusetts, relocated to Cambridge, Massachusetts, and currently lives in New York City. He has directed dozens of animations, experimental films, and video documentaries since the late 1960s.

== Films ==
In 1967-69 Brown used Super 8mm to create psychedelic imagery for the light shows at the Boston Tea Party club. His animated films have been seen on AMC, MTV, VH1, and Sesame Street. A 40-year retrospective of his work was shown January 2007 at the Anthology Film Archives, which outlined Brown's extensive work in the following notes:

It is high time for a survey of the absolutely unique image world of filmmaker, photographer, cartoonist and designer Ken Brown. A man who dons many hats, Brown is perhaps best known for his peculiar and distinctive postcards and other graphic products (wrapping paper, rubber stamps, T-shirts, etc.). His first love and most abiding passion, however, is film. In the late 1960s, Brown was the filmmaker for the ultra-psychedelic Boston Tea Party light show, producing Super-8mm works loaded with staggering superimpositions and startling visual dimensions. His subsequent short films have continued to mine his deep fascination with American pop culture, the quotidian world of home movies and the idiosyncratic world of outsiders and visionary artists. Besides the copious experimental films, animations and video documentaries he has made over the years, Brown has produced and directed dozens of short commissions for MTV, VH-1, Sesame Street, AMC and other clients. These two programs will give an overview of his prodigious output.

== Art and ephemera ==
His artwork has been exhibited in New York, Chicago, Dallas, Seattle, Zurich, and Tokyo. He often works in collage, and many of his images lean toward surrealism. Much of his output has been marketed on postcards, T-shirts, rubber stamps, wrapping paper, mouse pads, and kitchen towels. Fine art prints have been made from his extensive collection of vintage postcards and paper ephemera.

In recent years, Brown has focused on street photography, often documenting wall murals, graffiti, and other publicly visible urban art.

== Goofy Garden Golf ==
In 2004, he teamed with urban installation artist Maria Reidelbach to create Goofy Garden Golf, a decorative miniature golf course at Pier 25 in Manhattan's Hudson River Park. The Goofy Garden featured the world's largest garden gnome, planned as a tribute to Frieda Carter, who designed the first miniature golf course at Lookout Mountain, Tennessee, in 1928.

== Personal life ==
Brown has lived in an apartment on Harrison Street in Brooklyn since 1985 with his wife, the animator Lisa Crafts, where they raised their daughter Jemma. His apartment is filled with ephemera and small figurines from the 1940s, 1950s, and 1960s.

== Selected filmography ==
- Psychedelic Cinema (1967–69, 5 min, Super-8mm light-show excerpt)
- Life Soup (1972–74, 9 min, Super-8mm, optically printed to 16mm)
- Stampede (1974, 4 min, 16mm rubber-stamp animation)
- Pigeon Man (1979, 4 min, 16mm)
- Cloudz (1982, 4 min, 16mm)
- Photobooth Bop (1988, 3 min, 16mm animation)
- Goofy Golf (1983, 4 min, 3/4” video)
- Wigwam Village (1983, 4 min, 3/4” video)
- Holyland (1983, 4 min, 3/4” video)
- Fun Zone (1988, 3.5 min, Super-8mm to video)

== Books ==
- My Parachute is Beige, 2008
- The Unbearable Cuteness of Being, 2005
- Brown, Ken (1985). Notes From The Nervous Breakdown Lane. ISBN 0-06-096014-0.

== Watch ==
- Ken Brown's Visionary France trailer
