= City Hall Historic District (Cambridge, Massachusetts) =

Historic district in Massachusetts, United States

- U.S. National Register of Historic Places
- U.S. Historic district
- U.S. Historic district – Contributing property
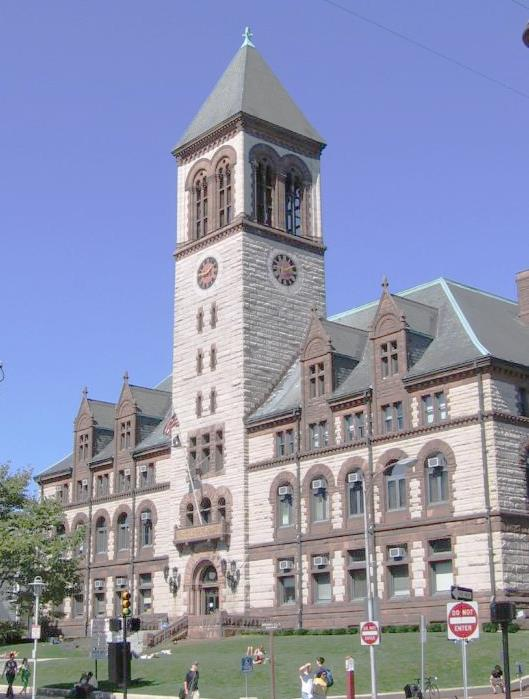
- Cambridge City Hall

- Location within Massachusetts Location within the United States
- Location: Cambridge, Massachusetts
- Coordinates: 42°22′0″N 71°6′20″W
- Built: 1888
- Architectural style: Renaissance, Romanesque
- Part of: Central Square Historic District (ID90000128)
- MPS: Cambridge MRA
- NRHP reference No.: 82001932

Significant dates
- Added to NRHP: April 13, 1982
- Designated CP: March 2, 1990

The City Hall Historic District is a historic district encompassing buildings important in the early growth of the Central Square area of Cambridge, Massachusetts. The focal point of the district is the monumental Richardsonian Romanesque Cambridge City Hall building on the north side of Massachusetts Avenue, two block west of the heart of the square. It also includes four buildings in the block just east of city hall, which is bounded by Bigelow and Temple Streets, Inman and Richard Allen Drives. City Hall was built in 1888 to a design by Longfellow, Alden & Harlow. Other buildings in the district include the Syrian Orthodox Catholic Church, built in 1822 and moved to 8 Inman Street from Lafayette Square in 1888, the 1888 Cambridge Mutual Fire Insurance Building at 763 Mass. Avenue, the 1912 Cambridge Electric Light Company Building at 719 Mass. Avenue, and the 1910 Cambridge YWCA at 7 Temple Street.

The district was listed on the National Register of Historic Places in 1982. In 1990, all of the district was also included in the larger Central Square Historic District.

== See also ==
- National Register of Historic Places listings in Cambridge, Massachusetts
