= Central Square, Cambridge =

- Central Square Historic District
- U.S. National Register of Historic Places
- U.S. Historic district
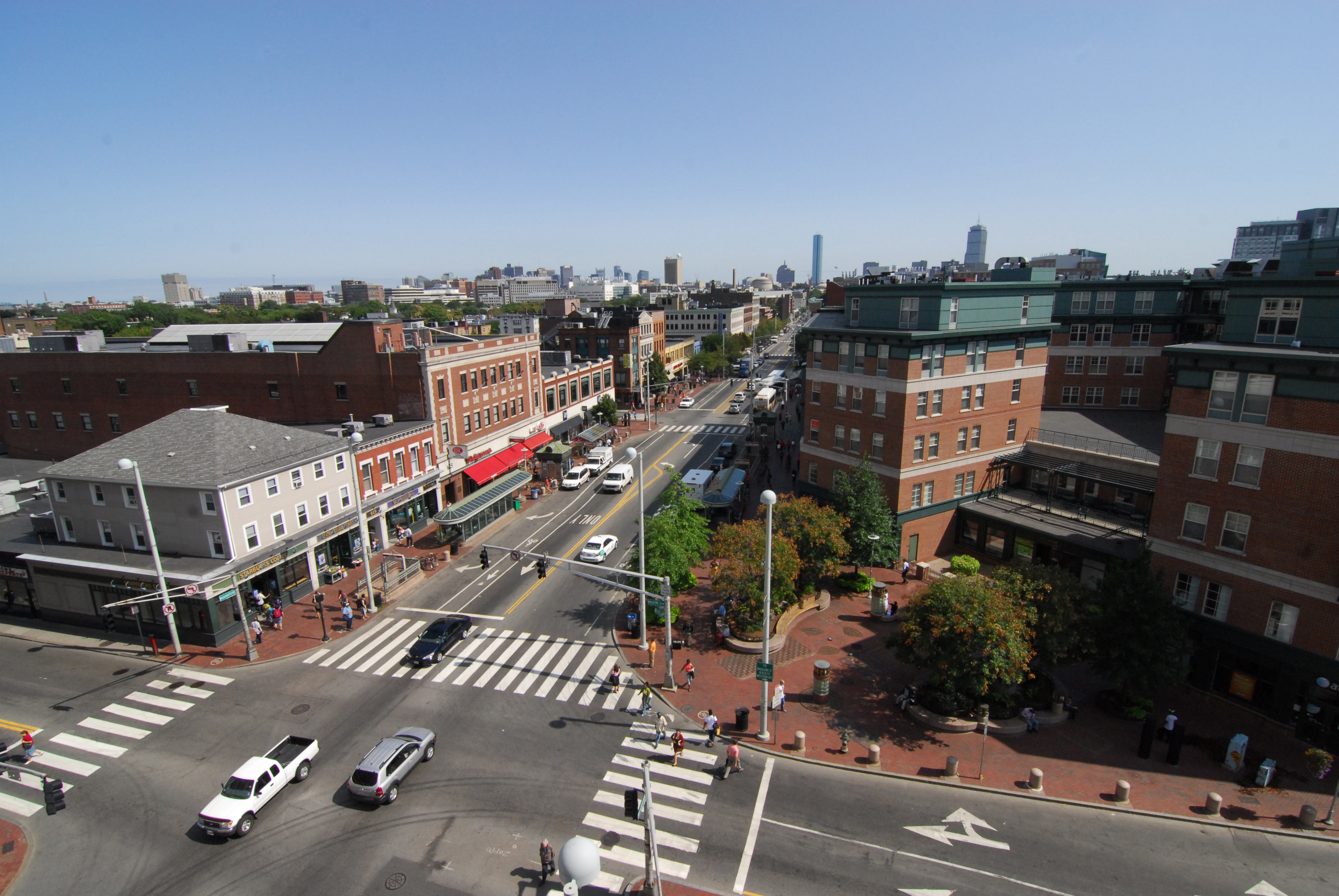
- Central Square, looking down Massachusetts Avenue toward Kendall Square and Harvard Bridge to Boston

- Location within Greater Boston area Location within Massachusetts Location within the United States
- Location: Cambridge, Massachusetts, U.S.
- Coordinates: 42°21′54″N 71°6′13″W
- Built: 1793
- Architect: Hartwell and Richardson, et al.
- Architectural style: Late 19th and 20th century Revivalism, Late Victorian, Federal
- MPS: Cambridge MRA
- NRHP reference No.: 90000128
- Added to NRHP: March 2, 1990

Central Square is an area in Cambridge, Massachusetts centered on the junction of Massachusetts Avenue, Prospect Street and Western Avenue. Lafayette Square, formed by the junction of Massachusetts Avenue, Columbia Street, Sidney Street and Main Street, is also considered a part of the Central Square area. Harvard Square is to the northwest along Massachusetts Avenue, Inman Square is to the north along Prospect Street and Kendall Square is to the east along Main Street. The section of Central Square along Massachusetts Avenue between Clinton Street and Main Street is designated the Central Square Historic District, and was added to the National Register of Historic Places in 1990.

== Culture ==
Central Square was designated an official Cultural District in the state of Massachusetts by the Mass Cultural Council in October 2012. Central Square is known for its wide variety of ethnic restaurants, churches, bars, and live music and theatre venues. Richard B. Modica Way, aka "Graffiti Alley", has been described as a "hallmark of Central Square." It is gentrifying rapidly, and a number of upscale restaurants have opened in the Square. Many startups, including pharmaceutical, videogame and Internet companies, have moved research and office operations into the Square to take advantage of the proximity to MIT, Boston medical resources and relatively low costs. Some critics have claimed that the recent changes have diminished the Square's edge, as some of the older Square businesses such as Manray have closed. There is also a diverse array of houses of worship in the area, with Christ the King Presbyterian Church, First Baptist Church, Sts. Constantine & Helen Greek Orthodox Church, St. Paul's African Methodist Episcopal Church and other large historic congregations meeting near the Square.

== History ==
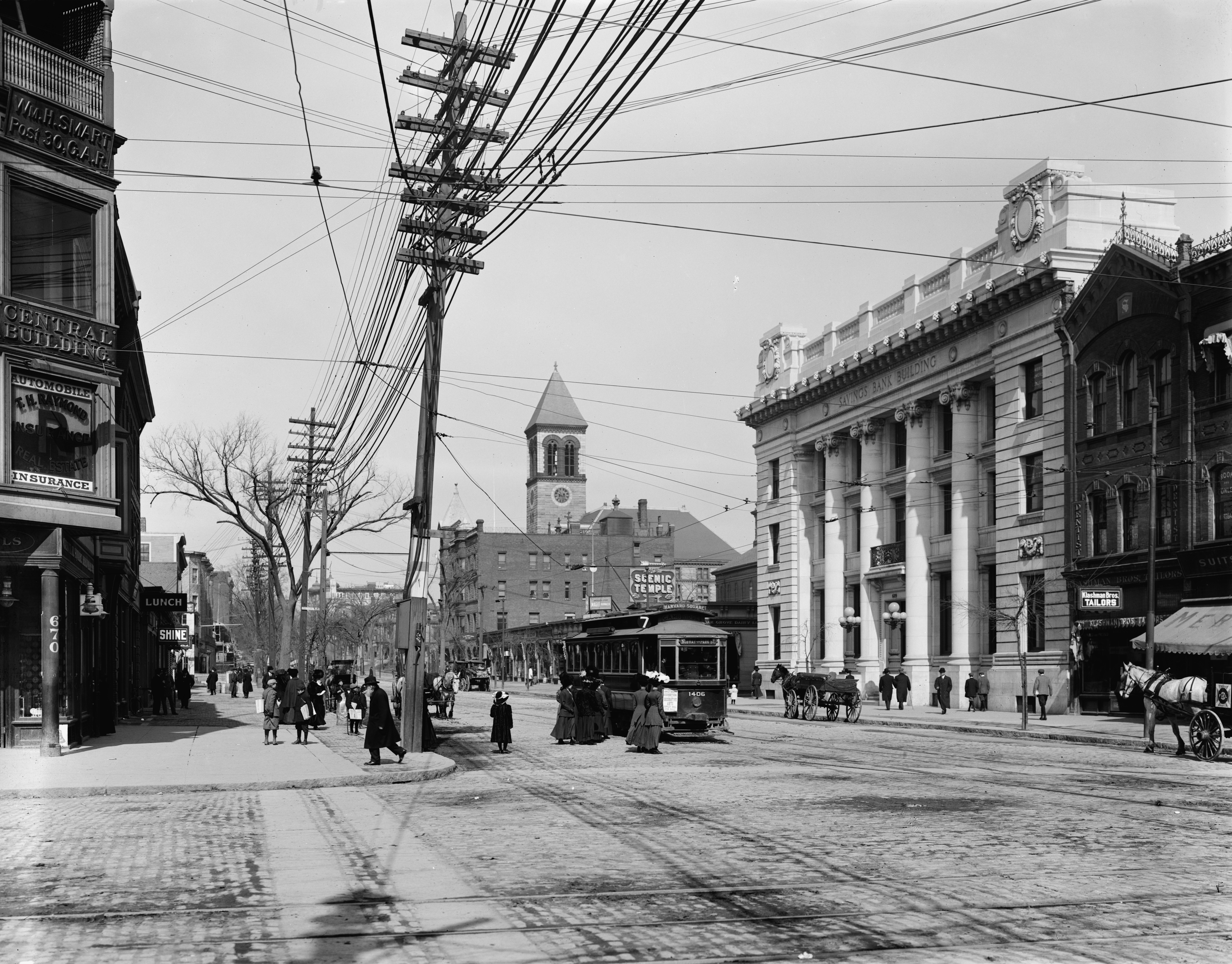
Central Square, Cambridge, Mass., c. 1911.

Central Square's history has been marked by several waves of immigration. The original population of the Square included people of English and Canadian ancestry. Between 1850 and 1890, the Square attracted many Irish immigrants, and in the late Nineteenth Century also became home to many others from throughout Europe. Later waves of immigration included people from the West Indies, South America and Africa.

Central Square is also the original home of actor Ben Affleck and, from 1927 to 2003, the Necco factory. The old Necco factory building in Cambridge is now used for labs by Novartis.

== Geography and transportation ==
Several Cambridge neighborhoods meet at Central Square. To the east, Area 4 lies on the north side of Massachusetts Avenue (aka "Mass Ave.") and Cambridgeport on the south side between Massachusetts Avenue and the Charles River. Both of these neighborhoods were once known as The Port or Old Port region of Cambridge. The area to the west and northwest of Central Square is known as Mid-Cambridge.

Central Square is accessible from Central station on the MBTA Red Line, as well as Buses 1, 64, 70, 83, and 91.

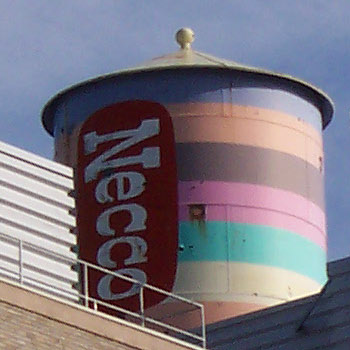
The New England Confectionery Co. water tower, built 1927, was painted in 1996 to resemble a roll of Necco Wafers, but repainted to a new design in 2004 by Novartis.

The intersection of Massachusetts Avenue and Brookline in front of The Middle East in Central Square is named in honor of the late indie rock musician Mark Sandman, who often played there.

Central Square serves as the commercial center for the surrounding neighborhoods of Cambridgeport, Riverside, Mid Cambridge, Area 4 and MIT.

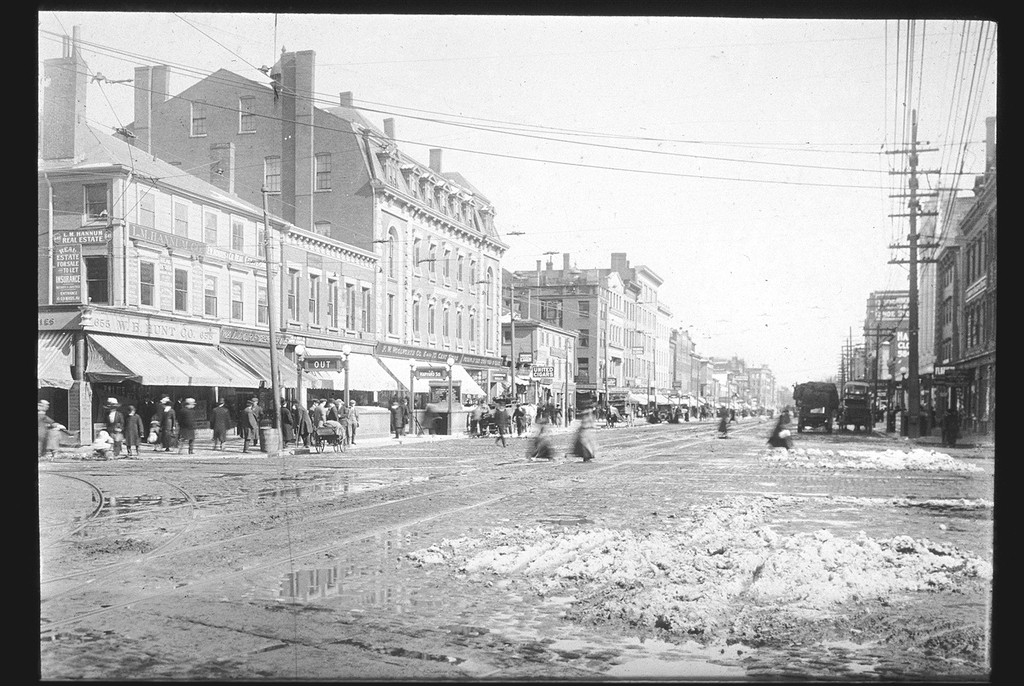
Central Square circa 1900

== Local government services ==
Central Square is the seat of government in Cambridge. Cambridge City Hall, and the main branch of the Cambridge Post Office are located in this area. The Cambridge Police Department headquarters was formerly at 5 Western Avenue in the Central Square area; however, between November 2008 and March 2009 it completed a relocation to a new facility at 125 Sixth Street, near Kendall Square.

== Notable residents ==
- Ben Affleck, actor
- Casey Affleck, actor
- Ken Brown, filmmaker
- Lisa Crafts, animator
- Patrick Ewing, athlete
- Vernon Grant, cartoonist
- John Forbes Nash, mathematician
- Margaret Hamilton, scientist and engineer

== Notable businesses ==
- Central Square Theater
- The Middle East (nightclub)
- Toscanini's
- T.T. the Bear's Place

== Fiction about Central Square ==
- Central Square (1998), by George Packer. Graywolf Press ISBN 1-55597-277-2

== See also ==
- Carl Barron Plaza
- National Register of Historic Places listings in Cambridge, Massachusetts
