= 145th Street (Manhattan) =

West-east street in Manhattan, New York

Coordinates: 40.823634°N 73.943825°W

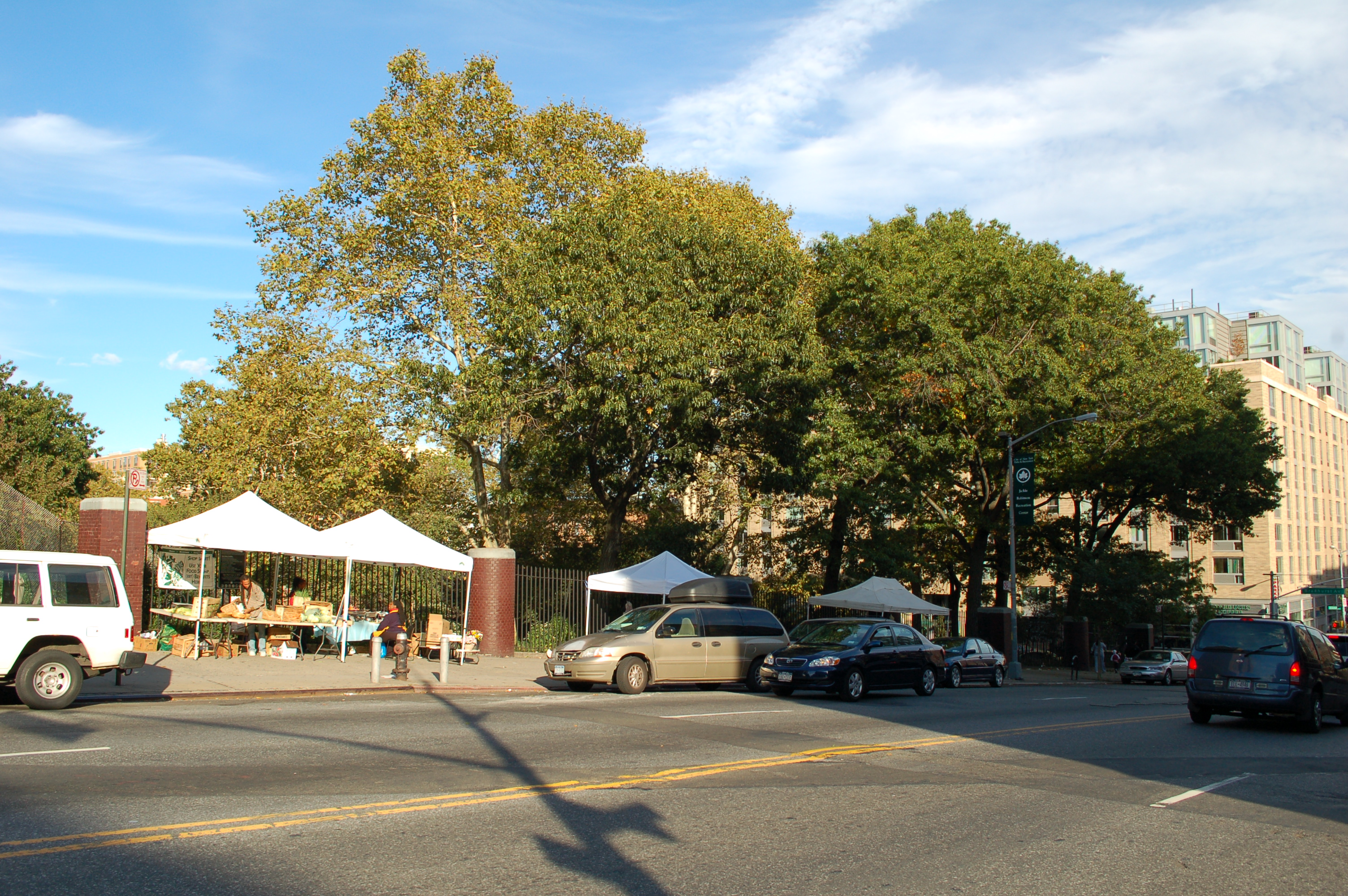
Jackie Robinson Park

145th Street is a major crosstown street in the Harlem neighborhood, in the New York City borough of Manhattan. It is one of the 15 crosstown streets mapped out in the Commissioner's Plan of 1811 that established the numbered street grid in Manhattan. It forms the southern border of the Sugar Hill neighborhood within Harlem.

== Description ==
145th Street starts on the West Side at the Henry Hudson Parkway, crossing Riverside Drive, Broadway, Amsterdam Avenue, Convent Avenue and Saint Nicholas Avenue. The street passes Edgecombe Avenue and Bradhurst Avenue, where 145 Street forms the southern border of Jackie Robinson Park. The street continues, crossing Frederick Douglass Boulevard, Adam Clayton Powell Boulevard and Lenox Avenue, before crossing over Harlem River Drive and then continuing east as the 145th Street Bridge into The Bronx.

== Transportation ==
The Bx19 traverses 145th Street from end-to-end, starting with a loop in Riverbank State Park and heading back to the Bronx over the 145th Street Bridge to the New York Botanical Garden. The M11 also serves West 145th Street west of Riverside Drive, including the park.

Subway stations are, west to east:

- 145th Street serving the 1 route at Broadway
- 145th Street serving the A, B, C, and D routes at Saint Nicholas Avenue
- 145th Street serving the 3 route at Lenox Avenue
