= Cambridge Police Department (Massachusetts) =

Coordinates: 42.3675°N 71.0858°W

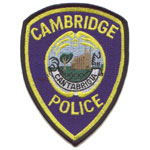
- Patch of Cambridge Police Department
- Abbreviation: CPD

Agency overview
- Formed: 1859; 167 years ago
- Preceding agency: Constabulary
- Employees: 319
- Annual budget: $51,145,765 (2017)

Jurisdictional structure
- Operations jurisdiction: Massachusetts, USA
- Area: Land Area 6.43 sq mi (16.7 km^{2})
- Population: Residents 107,000, Daytime Population 150,000+
- Legal jurisdiction: City of Cambridge, Massachusetts
- Governing body: Cambridge City Council
- General nature: Local civilian police

Operational structure
- Headquarters: Cambridge, Massachusetts
- Police Officers: 278
- Civilian employees: 41
- Commissioner responsible: Christine Elow

Website
- Cambridge Police

The Cambridge Police Department is the municipal police department for the city of Cambridge, Massachusetts, in the United States. Formally organized in 1859. with the appointment of John C. Willey as the first chief of police, the Cambridge Police Department was then staffed by only 16 officers. The Cambridge Police Department moved its headquarters location on December 8, 2008. The police department is now located in the Robert W. Healy Public Safety Facility at 125 Sixth Street in the neighborhood of East Cambridge, leaving their Central Square location after 135 years.

Prior to the move, the Cambridge Police were based in a facility at 5 Western Avenue, which was considered an outdated facility that had been used from 1933 to 2008.

== Cooperation ==
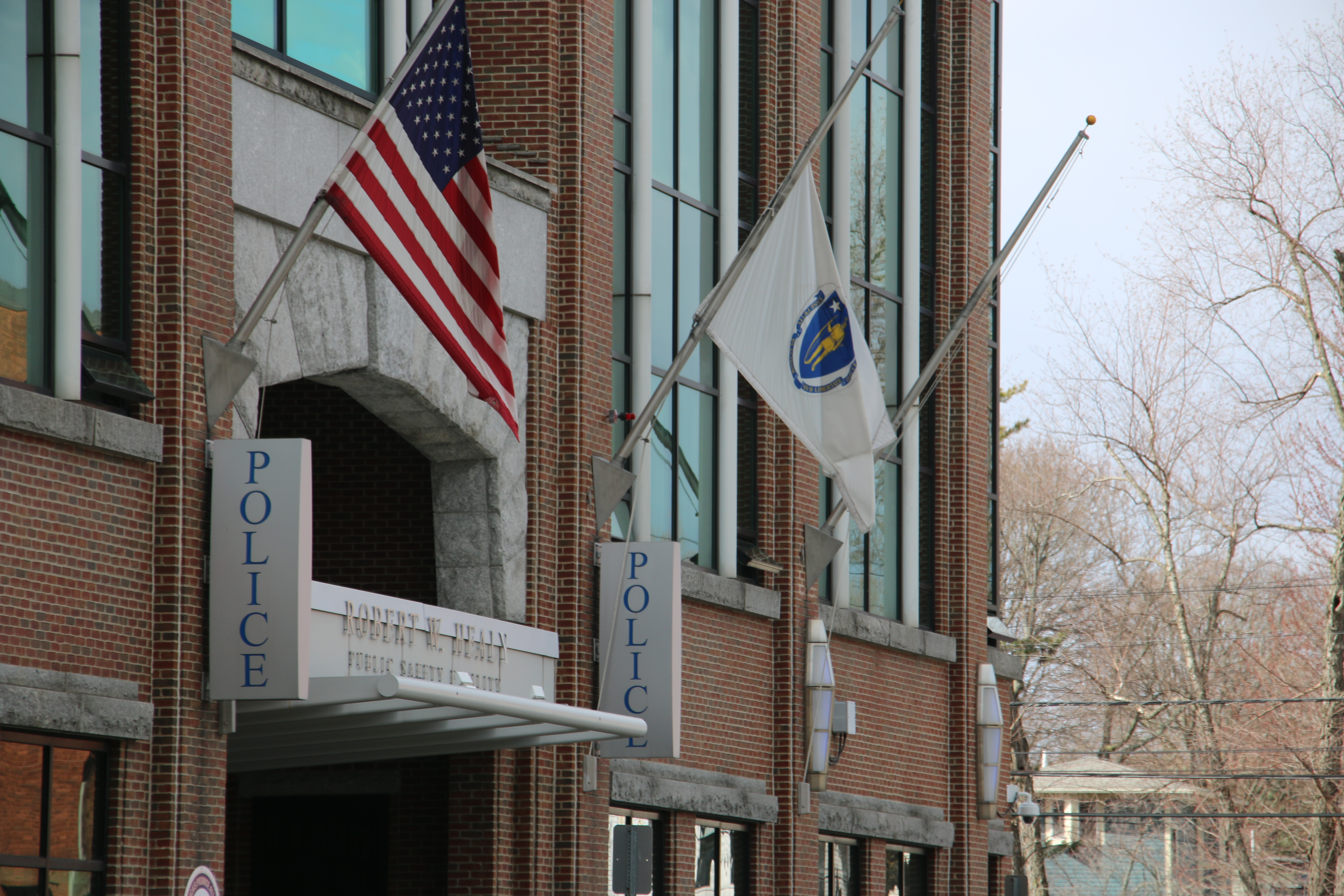
The department's headquarters in 2024

The Cambridge Police is the main law enforcement agency for the city of Cambridge where it holds ultimate jurisdiction over the city. Joint law enforcement may be carried out with the assistance of other law enforcement agencies including two divisions of the Massachusetts State Police known as the Fourth (Boston) and Fifth (Brighton) barracks of Troop H which provide cooperation with the Cambridge Police Department. Additionally, the Massachusetts Bay Transportation Authority Police may cover its own transit properties or facilities in Cambridge along with the Harvard University and MIT police providing coverage for their local campuses and other facilities.

== Officers killed in the line of duty ==
Since the establishment of the CPD, five officers have died in the line of duty.

- Officer William Loughrey

Patrol Officer Loughrey was stabbed to death on June 26, 1860, while attempting to arrest a suspect near what is known today as the Longfellow Bridge. He observed the man, covered in blood, running down the street. Believing the man was being pursued by other officers, Officer Loughrey attempted to subdue him. The suspect stabbed Officer Loughrey several times, causing him to bleed to death. Officer Loughrey was with the Cambridge Police Department for 14 years.

- Officer Thomas J. Riley

Patrolman Riley was shot and killed on November 20, 1920, while trying to disperse a group of drunk men. As he turned to leave one of the men produced a revolver and shot Patrolman Riley in the head. Patrolman Riley had been with the agency for eight years.

A 25-year-old suspect was arrested and convicted of murder.

- Officer John J. Guthrie

Patrolman John Guthrie succumbed to injuries sustained five days earlier on December 26, 1926, when he was struck by a car while directing traffic. The impact threw Patrolman Guthrie into the path of oncoming streetcar. He was transported to a local hospital where he remained until succumbing to his injuries.

Patrolman Guthrie had served with the Cambridge Police Department for 17 years.

- Officer Albert G. Eckardt

Patrolman Albert Eckart was killed on November 3, 1951, after being thrown from the back of an ambulance at the intersection of Prospect Street and Harvard Street. He was escorting a patient to the hospital during a snow storm when the accident occurred. Patrolman Eckart served in law enforcement for nine years. He was in the U.S. Army as a military policeman during WWII before returning to the Cambridge police force.

- Officer Lawrence W. Gorman

Patrolman Lawrence Gorman was shot and killed on September 3, 1960, while attempting to arrest two burglary suspects in Kendall Square. He observed the two men breaking into a restaurant and tried to arrest them when they opened fire, mortally wounding him. He was able to return fire and wound one of the suspects in the leg, who was taken into custody.

On May 14, 1961, the captured suspect, aided by his accomplice, escaped from the Middlesex County Jail along with another inmate. With a smuggled handgun he shot and killed Jail Master David S. Robinson. Three days later he shot and killed himself when police stormed a Boston apartment where he was hiding. His accomplice and the other escapee were captured a short time later. On September 24, 1961, his accomplice was convicted of Patrolman Gorman's murder and sentenced to death. His sentence was later commuted to life. Patrolman Gorman was a United States Navy veteran who served in World War II and was with the Cambridge Police Department for eight years.

- MIT Police Officer Sean Collier

Patrol Officer Sean Collier was shot and killed on April 18, 2013, during a large-scale manhunt for suspects in the Boston Marathon bombing. At approximately 10:30 pm one of the subjects approached Officer Collier as he sat in his patrol car and opened fire on him without warning, striking him several times. The subjects then attempted to steal his service weapon but were thwarted by his level-three holster.

The suspects then carjacked a vehicle and led police on a pursuit while throwing explosive devices at pursuing units. The pursuit ended in Watertown, where one suspect was killed, and a Massachusetts Bay Transportation Authority police officer was shot and seriously wounded in a gun battle. The second suspect was captured in Watertown the following evening after another shootout.

Officer Collier had served with the Massachusetts Institute of Technology Police Department since January 2012 and had previously worked as a civilian employee of the Somerville Police Department. On August 22, 2013, he was posthumously sworn in as a Somerville police officer.

== Rank structure ==
Title	Insignia
Commissioner	
Superintendent	
Deputy Superintendent	
Lieutenant	
Sergeant	
Patrol Officer/Detective	

Former ranks

- Captain – The rank of captain was eliminated in 2007 with the retirement of Captain Richard Bongiorno.
- Inspector - Now Detectives
- Reserve Officer - Officers were previously appointed in a reserve capacity for a time before receiving "full time" appointments.

=== Neighboring police departments ===
- Arlington
- Belmont
- Boston
- Somerville
- Watertown

=== Specifics ===
- Emergency: 9-1-1
- Non-emergency: +1.617.349.3300
- Address: 125 Sixth Street, Cambridge, Massachusetts USA 02142
  - Former Address: 5 Western Avenue, 02139
- Marked Patrol Vehicles: 37
- Unmarked Patrol Vehicles: 35, plus 8 narcotics vehicles
- Motorcycles: 14
- Bicycles: 22
- Special Vehicles: 8 tactical vehicles, 3 tactical ATVs, 6 trailers
- 2016 Calls for Service: 98,261

== Fleet details ==
- Chevrolet Blazer EV - Marked Patrol Units
- Ford Police Interceptor Utility Hybrid – Marked Patrol Units, Traffic Units, and Community Outreach Units.
- Ford F-150 Lightning – Crash Investigation Unit.
- Ford Mach E - Community Outreach Unit.
- Ford Transit Van - Prisoner Transport Unit.
- BMW Motorcycles – Traffic Units.

== Fleet gallery ==
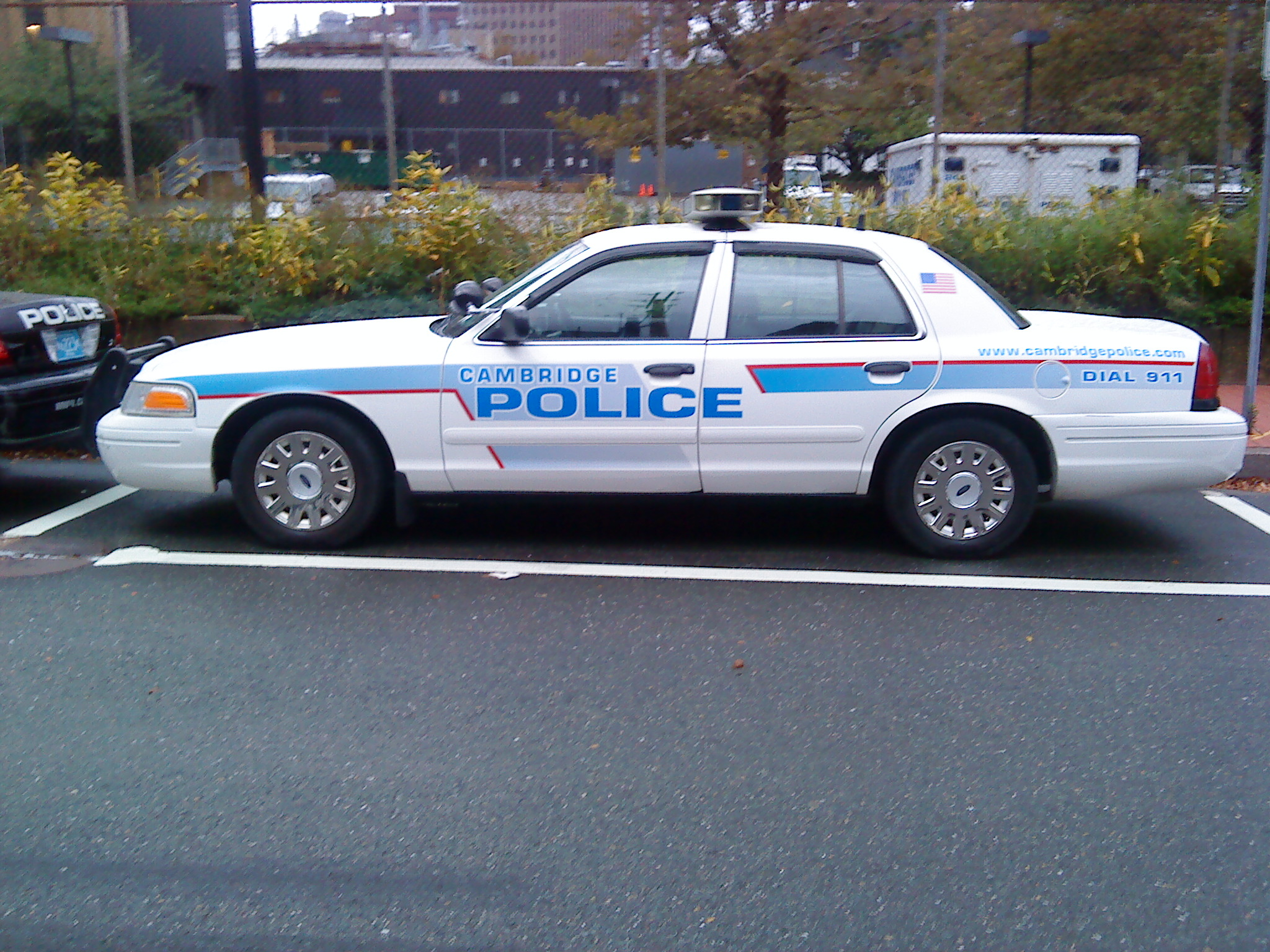
City of Cambridge police cruiser, older design (side-view).

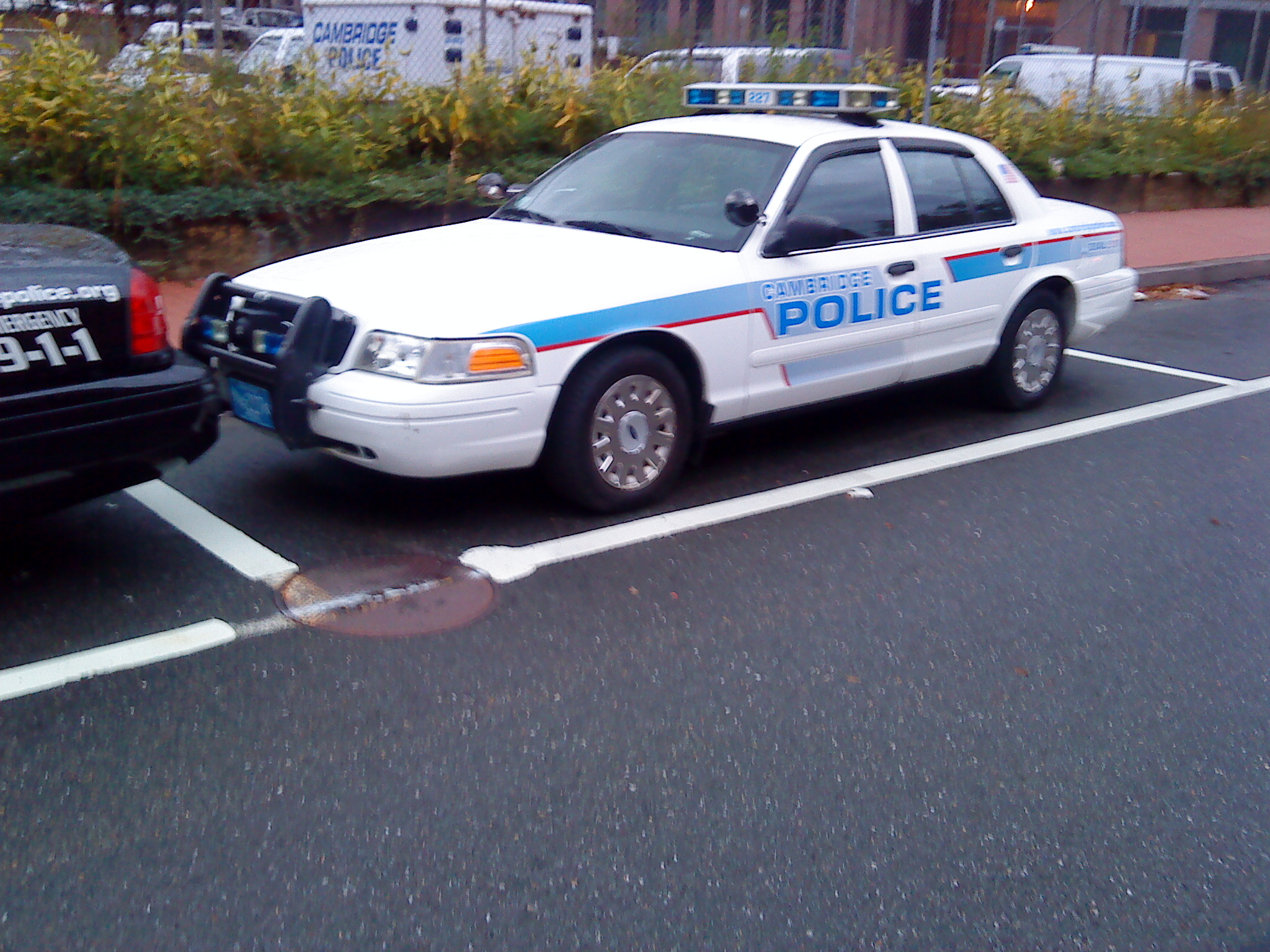
City of Cambridge police cruiser, older design (front driver's side view).

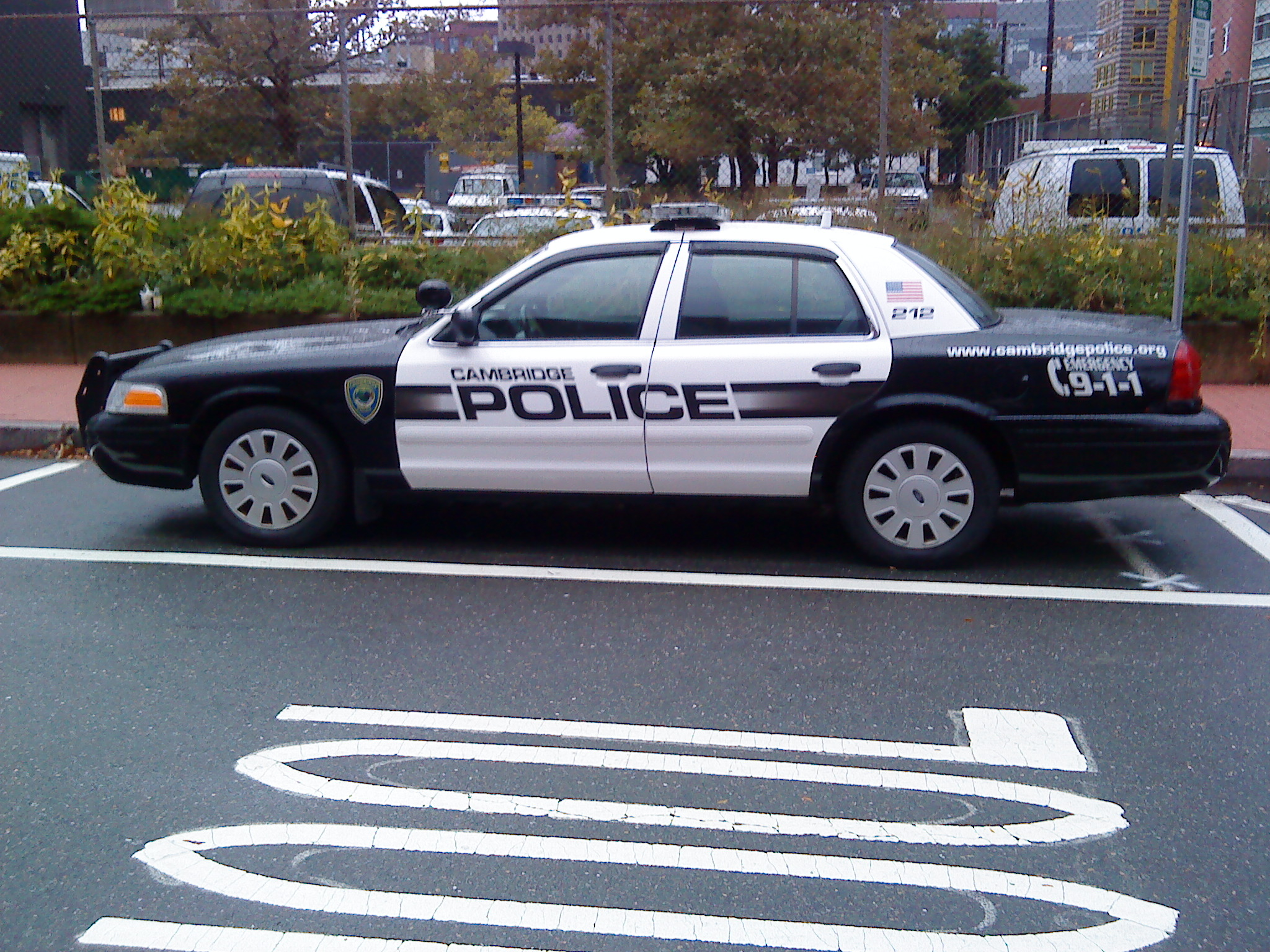
City of Cambridge police cruiser, current design (side-view).

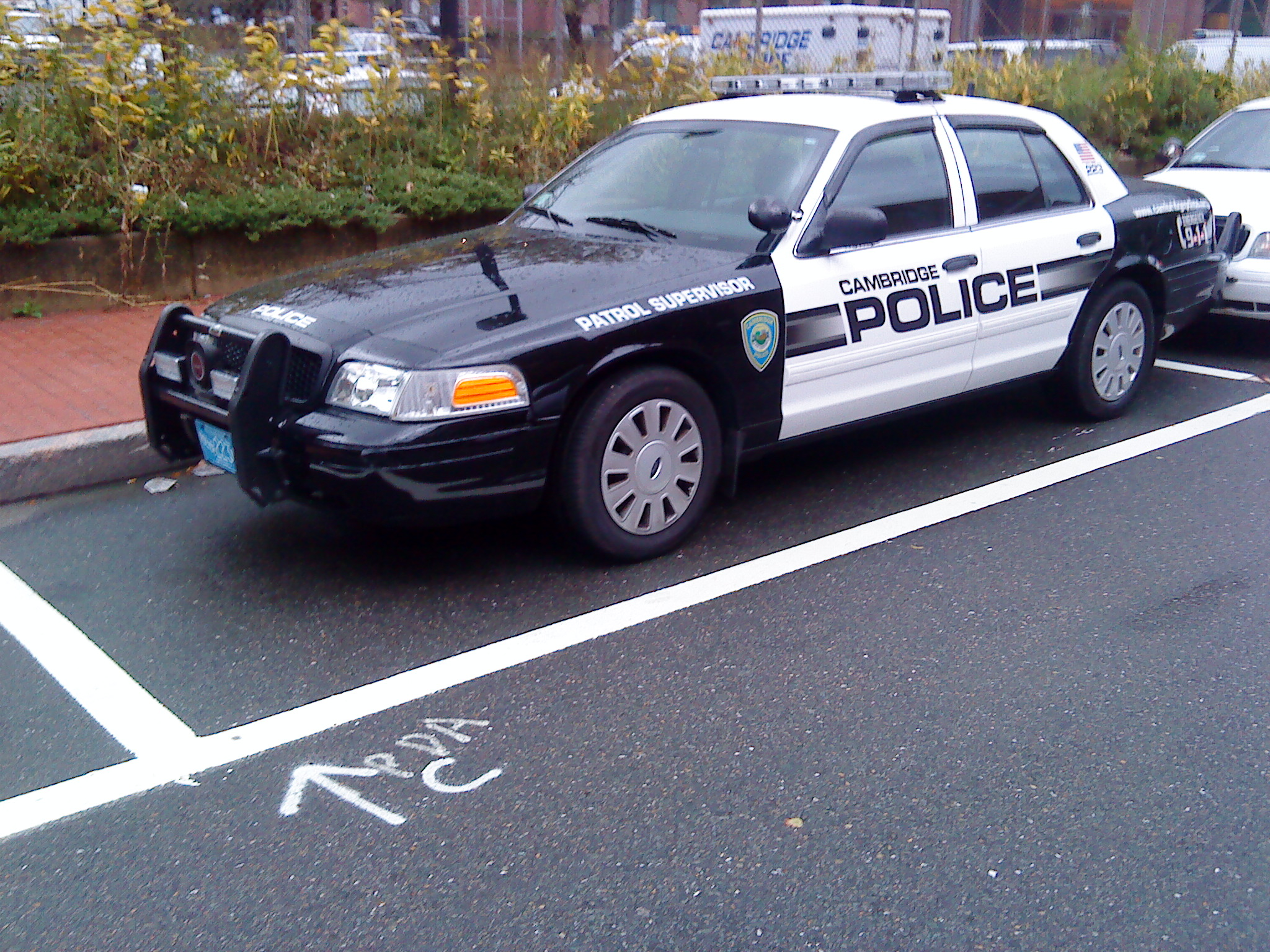
City of Cambridge police cruiser, current design (front driver's side view).

== See also ==
- List of law enforcement agencies in Massachusetts
- Henry Louis Gates arrest controversy
- 2007 Boston bomb scare
