= Lisa Crafts =

American film director

Lisa Crafts is an American animator and moving image artist whose interdisciplinary work has addressed issues of environmental uncertainty, sexuality, creativity and chaos.

== Practice ==
Her current body of work focuses on a series of short moving image pieces about the Anthropocene, revealing the horror, beauty, humor and loss of the epoch.

Crafts' work blends animation, video, photography, drawing, painting and sculpture. It has been exhibited in galleries, museums, theaters and film festivals including the Museum of Modern Art, Film Forum, Slamdance, Tribeca Film Festival and La Luz de Jesus. She is a 2012 Guggenheim Fellow and has received grants from the Jerome Foundation, New York State Council on the Arts, New York Foundation for the Arts and The MacDowell Colony. One of Crafts' best known works is Desire Pie, a feminist erotic animation which screened widely; was "banned in Boston"; was lost, found, and restored; and ended up in the permanent collection of the Museum of Modern Art, New York.

Crafts teaches in the film-video department of Pratt Institute in Brooklyn, NY.

Crafts has collaborated with documentary filmmakers to create animation of dreams, memories and hallucinations. Notable work includes Michel Negroponte's Methodonia and I'm Dangerous With Love, Cindy Kleine’s Phyllis and Harold and André Gregory: Before and After Dinner. She has also created animations in collaboration with Ken Brown for Sesame Street, American Movie Classics, MTV and VH1. One of her Sesame Street animations, done solo, features the voice of the then-unknown anime voice actor Steve Blum.

== Selected Animation and Moving Image Works ==
- Season of Wonder, 2015
- Still Life with Golden Apple, 2014
- Spitopia, 2014
- Oil Spill With Bird, 2013
- 3 Natures Mortes, 2010
- Overgrowth, 2009
- The Flooded Playground, 2005.
- Shout!, 1985
- The Octopus's Exultation, 1984
- Glass Gardens, 1982
- Pituitary, 1979
- Desire Pie, 1976
