= 2016 Hoboken train crash =

2016 railroad disaster in New Jersey, US

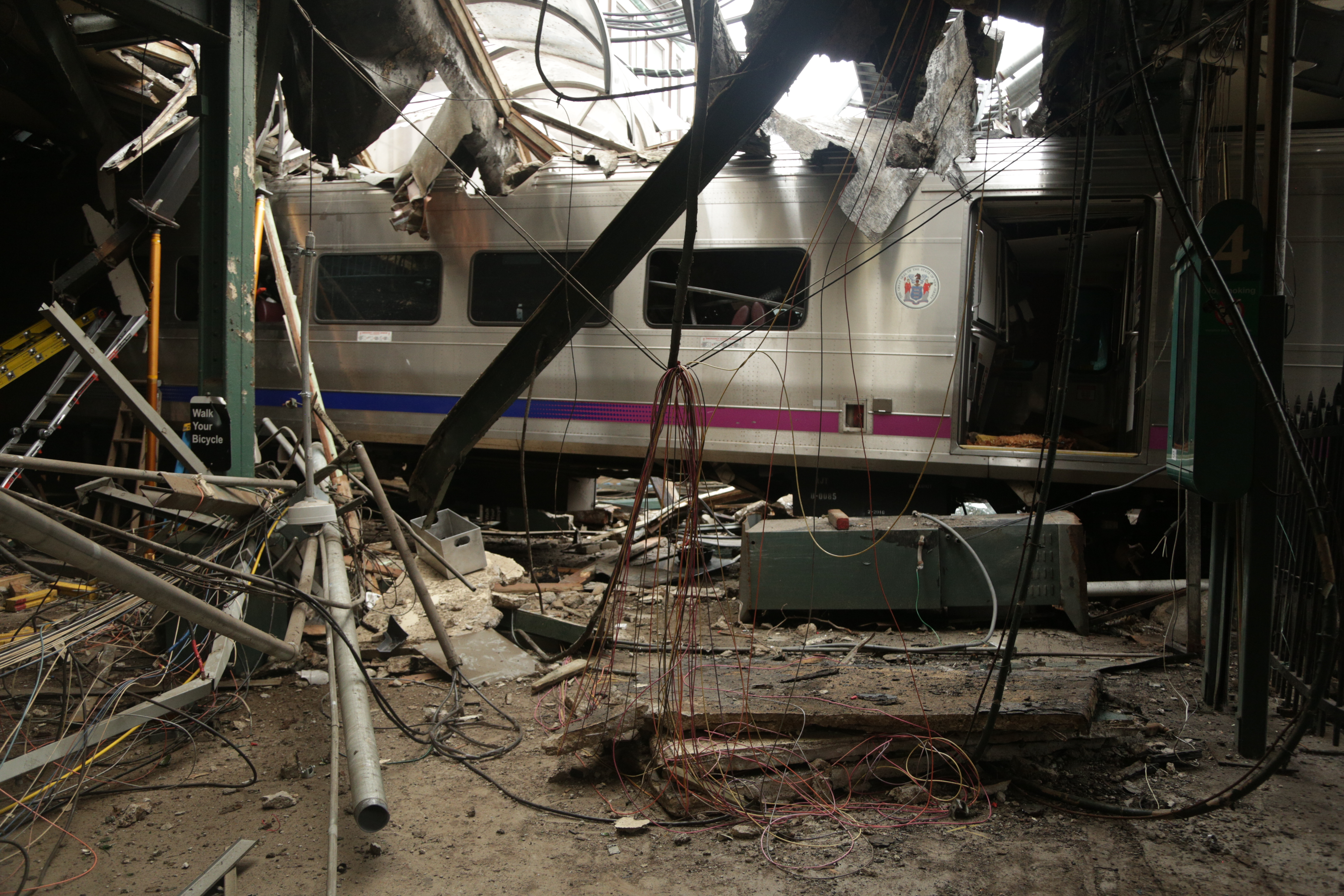
- The cab car surrounded by the destroyed canopy

- Location within Hudson County, New Jersey Location within New Jersey Location within the United States

Details
- Date: September 29, 2016; 10 years ago about 8:38 a.m. EDT (UTC-4)
- Location: Hoboken, New Jersey
- Coordinates: 40°44′5.64″N 74°1′40.08″W
- Country: United States
- Line: Pascack Valley Line
- Operator: NJ Transit
- Cause: Train operator's fatigue due to undiagnosed sleep apnea

Statistics
- Trains: 1 (NJ Transit commuter train)
- Deaths: 1
- Injured: 114

On September 29, 2016, an NJ Transit commuter train crashed at Hoboken Terminal in Hoboken, New Jersey. The accident occurred during the morning rush hour, at one of the busiest transportation hubs in the New York metropolitan area. One person died, and 114 others were injured. The train operator, who was in the cab car, was among the injured.

== Background ==
NJ Transit is the third-busiest commuter railroad in the United States. Before the 2016 crash, the last fatal incident on the railroad was the 1996 Secaucus train collision.

NJ Transit had been under audit by the Federal Railroad Administration since June 2016, before the crash. The probe was prompted by an increase in safety violations and led to federal citations of the agency.

== Crash ==
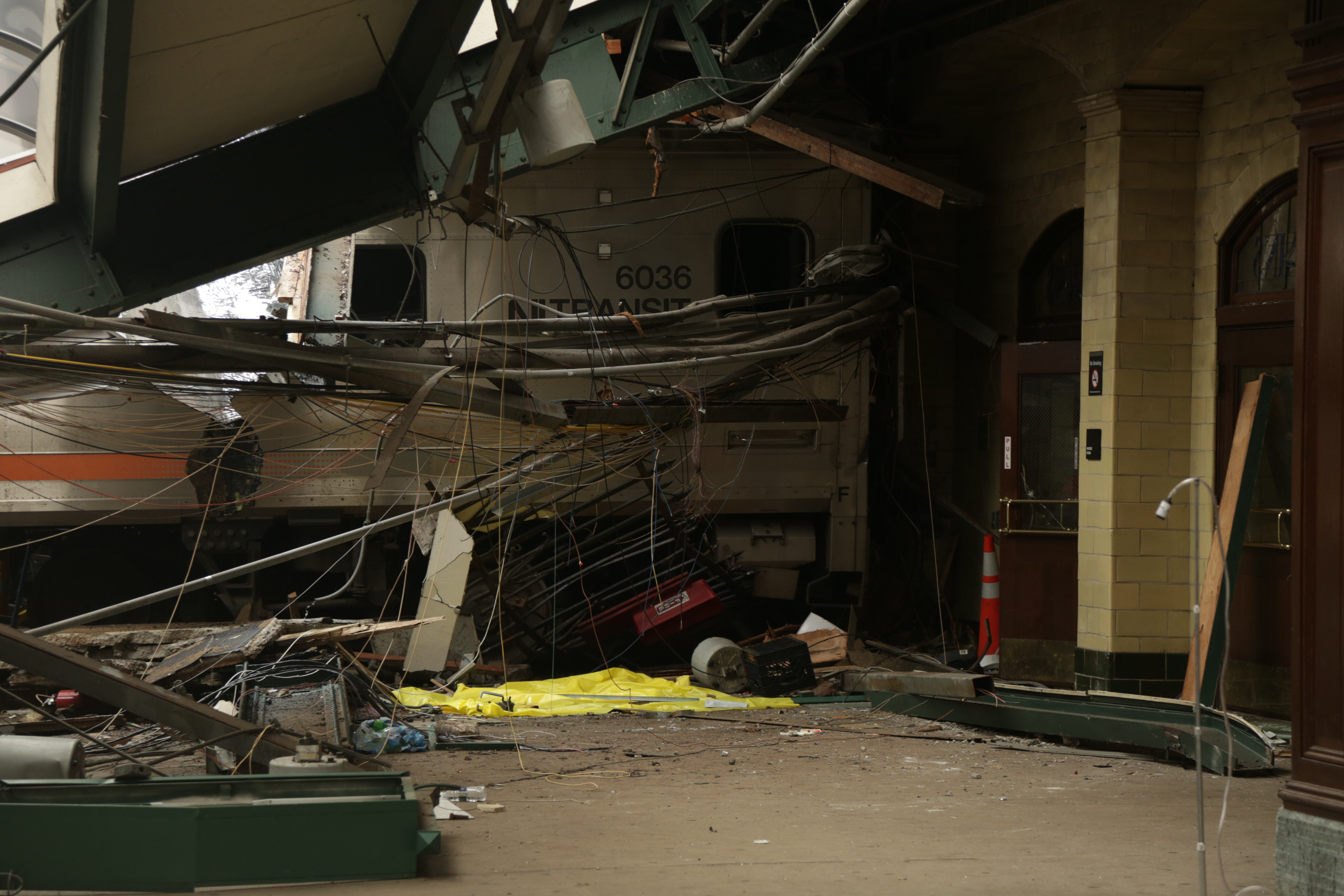
Cab car #6036 resting against the terminal wall after the crash

Pascack Valley Line train #1614 left the Spring Valley station in Spring Valley, New York, at 7:23 a.m. EDT, bound for Hoboken. Entering the Hoboken terminal around 8:45 a.m., the train went over the bumper block and through the rail concourse, coming to rest at the wall right before the station's waiting area. The cab car sustained major structural damage.

One witness reported that the train "never slowed down" as it entered the station, which is located at the end of the line.

The train involved in the crash reportedly did not have an automatic brake system using positive train control (PTC), which is used to slow the train in case the engineer does not apply the brake in time. It is unclear whether PTC would have prevented the crash.

Train #1614 consisted of four NJ Transit Comet V passenger cars (cab car #6036 and 3 coaches) and one NJT GP40PH-2B locomotive (#4214). Train #1614 was a local service, making all stops on the Pascack Valley Line. Comet V Cab Car #6036 was leading the train at the time of the accident, with locomotive #4214 pushing from the rear.

=== Casualties ===
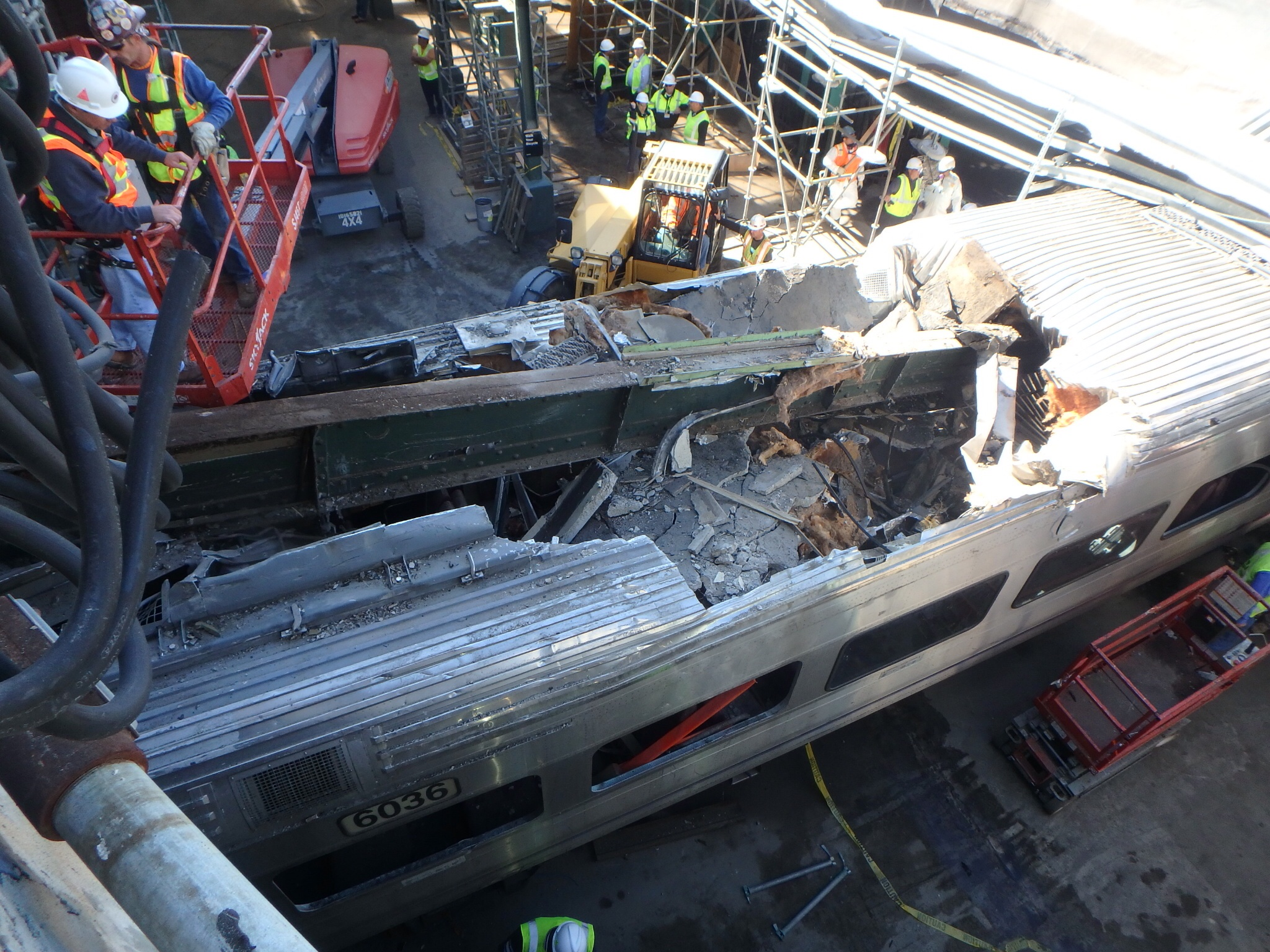
Damaged cab car

The accident caused one death and injured at least 114 other people. The Jersey City Medical Center treated 66 people for injuries from the crash; 53 of these were released from the hospital by the afternoon following the crash. The Hoboken University Medical Center treated 23 patients and the Christ Hospital treated one patient; of these all but two were released by the evening following the crash.

The lone fatality, a woman standing on the platform, was killed by falling debris. The victim was identified as attorney Fabiola Bittar de Kroon, 34, a married mother of one and native of Brazil who had recently moved to Hoboken. The majority of those injured were passengers on the crashed train.

=== Impact ===
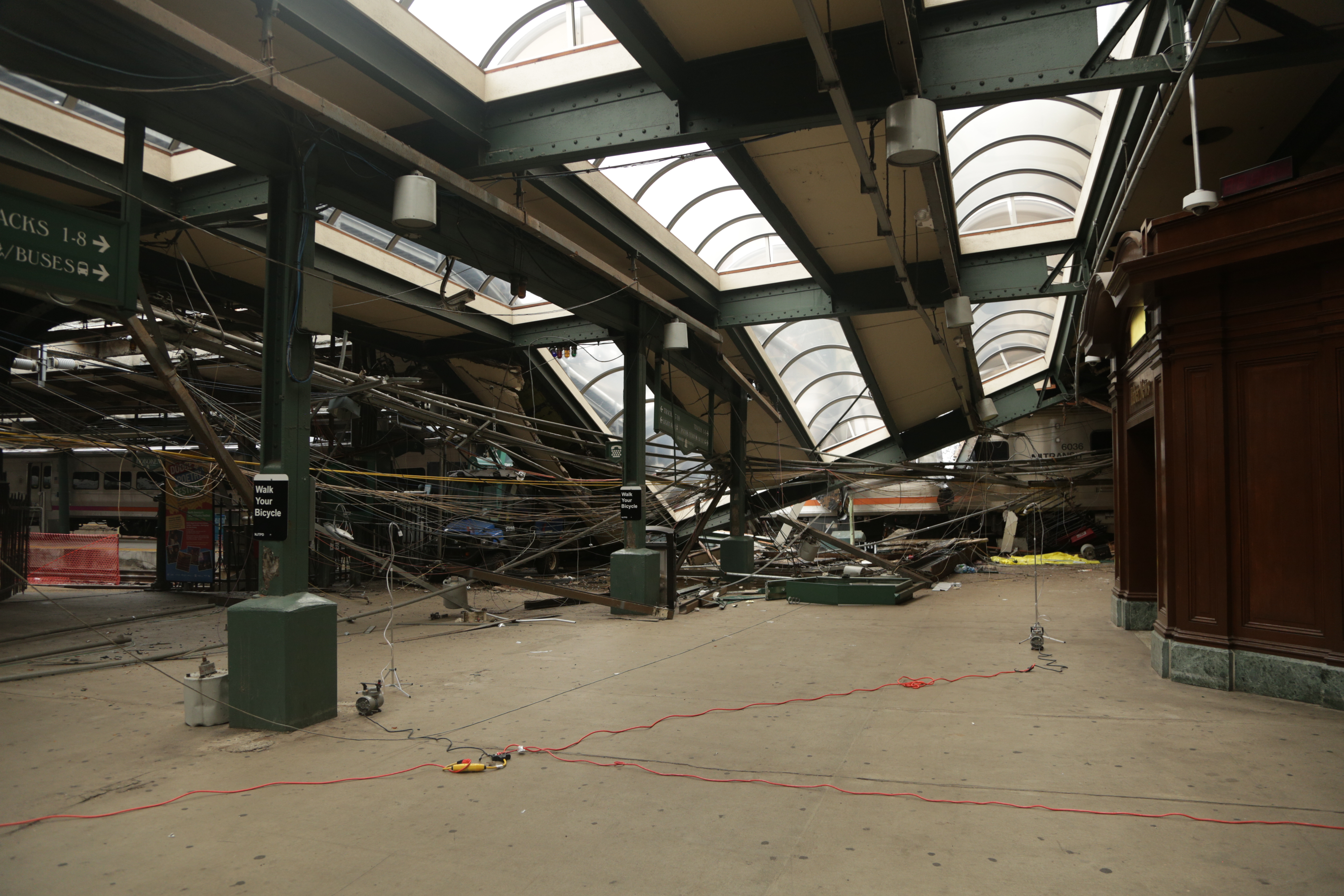
Collapsed portions of the station roof after the crash

Initial eyewitness reports indicated that portions of the station roof collapsed, as did part of the roof of the train shed, and that water was spraying from the site of the accident. Major structural damage to the station was reported.

Following the accident, rail service to and from the Hoboken station (including PATH service) was suspended, and local buses and ferries, as well as Metro-North Railroad, were cross-honoring NJ Transit train tickets. PATH service was suspended due to fears that the roof of the PATH station, where the derailed NJ Transit train came to rest, might collapse. PATH service into and out of the station was restored by the end of the day, as was Hudson-Bergen Light Rail service in and out of the station. Delays to rail service in the area persisted into the following week.

== Investigation ==
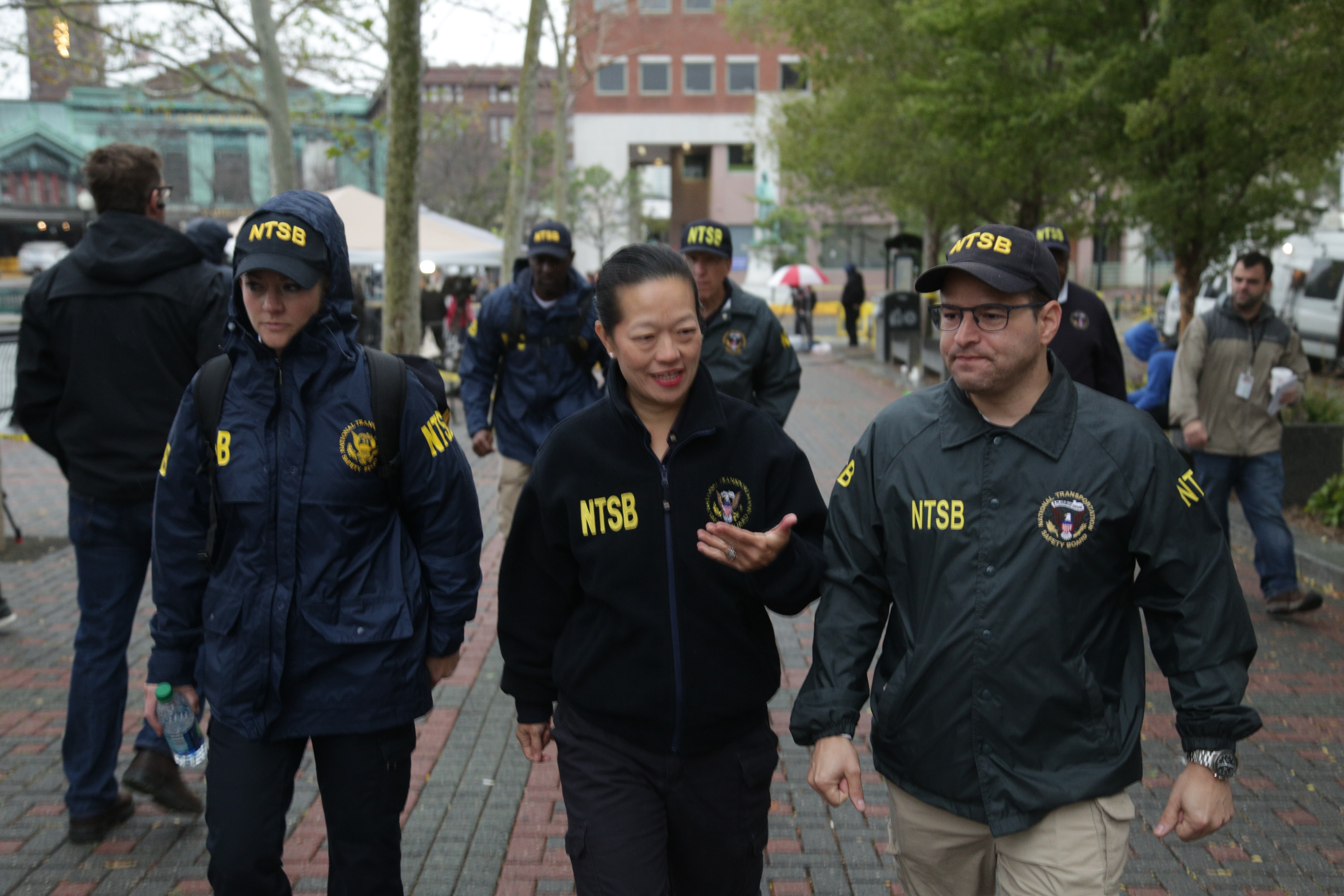
NTSB Vice Chairman Bella Dinh-Zarr and other NTSB employees outside Hoboken terminal.

The National Transportation Safety Board (NTSB) was responsible for investigating the accident. An NTSB "go team" was sent to the scene, and the Federal Railroad Administration also dispatched investigators. Although injured, the train engineer cooperated with the investigation, and both the engineer and the train conductor were interviewed by investigators. The engineer lacked any memory of the accident itself. According to the federal investigators, the engineer "felt well rested and was unaware of any mechanical problems in the moments before the accident."

Among other things, the NTSB investigation attempted to determine whether or not positive train control could have prevented the accident.

The day following the crash, investigators retrieved one of the two train event recorders (black boxes) from the wreckage, but it was unusable. The second black box was successfully recovered in the first week of October 2016.

On October 4, 2016, FEMA claimed responsibility for what appeared to have been a hijacking of Utica, New York TV station WKTV foreshadowing the disaster, which was under independent investigation by Snopes. FEMA told Snopes that they were conducting cross-nation tests for the EAS test and development message aggregators, using lines from various Dr. Seuss books as placeholder messages, when WKTV's EAS device mistakenly relayed to the public the messages it received in its testing environment. The chosen verse from Green Eggs and Ham and its proximity to Hoboken was purely coincidental, and FEMA had no culpability in the train crash.

On October 6, 2016, the train was removed from the station area for further investigation.

In November 2016, attorney Jack Arsenault said his client, the train engineer Thomas Gallagher, suffered from severe sleep apnea which was undiagnosed until after the crash. NJ Transit has a sleep apnea screening program but, despite that, a physical exam in July 2016 had cleared Gallagher for duty. Gallagher, aged 48 and with 18 years experience as a train engineer, said he had no memory of the crash and was lying on the cab floor when he woke up after the impact. An official briefed on the investigation told The Associated Press under condition of anonymity that the investigation had considered whether sleep apnea was a possible cause of the crash.

=== Cause ===
On February 6, 2018 the NTSB released their probable cause of the accident. The NTSB determined that the engineer's failure to stop was caused by fatigue due to undiagnosed sleep apnea. Contributing to the accident was NJ Transit's failure to follow their internal sleep apnea screening guidance to find at-risk workers and refer them for testing and treatment. NJ Transit failed to identify end of track collisions as a hazard despite numerous previous accidents. Additionally, the FRA was cited for their failure to require railroad to screen safety-critical workers for sleep disorders.

The FRA exempted NJ Transit from installing positive train control (PTC) at Hoboken Terminal. The NTSB stated that PTC could not be relied on to prevent end of terminal accidents. They stated the need for other technology to intervene prior to the collision. Hoboken Terminal has the original steel-and-concrete bumpers from when it was opened in 1907. The bumping post design was identified for only protecting low-speed unpowered accidents and therefore were insufficient in providing protection without technology to prevent end of track collisions. It is believed newer bumpers with hydraulic shock absorbers and sled-like friction shoes would have reduced the impact.

== Aftermath ==
Following the train crash, New Jersey Transit issued new regulations requiring that engineers must be accompanied by at least one other crew member as they pull a train into Hoboken Station. In addition NJ Transit also mandated a reduction in the approaching speed limit into the train station from 10 miles per hour to 5 miles per hour. The Hoboken Terminal remained closed until October 10, when Tracks 10 through 17 were reopened with a modified service schedule. Full service was not restored until October 17; Tracks 5 and 6, where the train crashed, remained closed while repairs were carried out. The pedestrian concourse reopened on May 14, 2017. Track 6 reopened for service in June 2017 and track 5 reopened for service sometime around September 2018. The planning for permanent repairs to the concourse roof and supports were ongoing during this time. In a February 2019 statement, NJ Transit stated that permanent repairs and renovations will begin in March and last for approximately one year. In April 2019, NJ Transit stated that all repairs would be completed by the end of 2019, which they succeeded in doing.

== Similar incidents ==
A similar accident occurred at the same station in December 1985, injuring 54 people. The 1985 crash was said to have been caused by a lubricant that had been applied to the tracks to test train wheels. Another similar incident occurred at Hoboken in May 2011, involving a PATH train which failed to stop at the end of a platform. The train crashed into a bumper block, injuring 32 people.

On January 4, 2017, a Long Island Railroad commuter train crashed at Atlantic Terminal, injuring 103 people. The accident was also attributed to sleep apnea. The December 2013 Spuyten Duyvil derailment was attributed to sleep apnea, which was found to be a factor in the 2016 Hoboken crash.

== See also ==
- List of American railroad accidents
- List of rail accidents (2010–2019)

Other accidents where engineers had sleep problems:

- 2008 Massachusetts train collision, trolley crash also blamed (posthumously) on the engineer's undiagnosed sleep apnea
- Bourne End rail crash, British accident where a sleep-challenged engineer may have lost attention going into a curve.
- Redondo Junction train wreck, deadliest rail accident in Los Angeles history; engineer said he "blacked out" beforehand
