= Newton rail accident =

The Newton rail accident may refer to:

- Newton (South Lanarkshire) rail accident in 1991
- Newton (Massachusetts) rail accident in 2008
