= December 2013 Spuyten Duyvil derailment =

Passenger commuter train accident that killed four

Spuyten Duyvil derailment (December 2013)
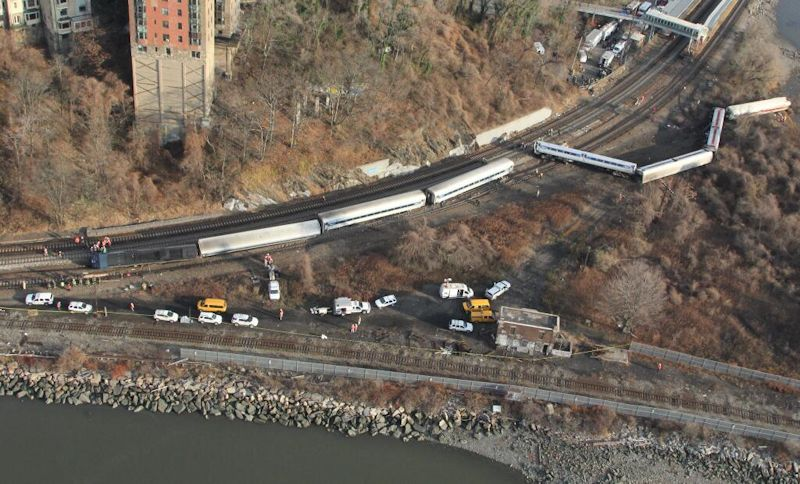
- Aerial view of the derailment

Details
- Date: December 1, 2013; 7:19 a.m. EST (12:19 UTC)
- Location: Near Spuyten Duyvil station
- Coordinates: 40°52′47″N 73°55′22″W
- Country: United States
- Line: Hudson Line
- Operator: MTA, Metro-North Railroad
- Incident type: Derailment
- Cause: Driver error, overspeeding

Statistics
- Trains: 1
- Passengers: 115
- Deaths: 4
- Injured: At least 61
- Damage: $9 million

On the morning of December 1, 2013, a Metro-North Railroad Hudson Line passenger train derailed near the Spuyten Duyvil station in the New York City borough of the Bronx. Four of the 115 passengers were killed and another 61 injured; the accident caused $9 million worth of damage. It was the deadliest train accident within New York City since a 1991 subway derailment in Manhattan, and the first accident in Metro-North's history to result in passenger fatalities. The additional $60 million in legal claims paid out as of 2020 have also made it the costliest accident in Metro-North's history.

Early investigations found that the train had gone into the curve where it derailed at almost three times the posted speed limit. The engineer, William Rockefeller, later admitted that before reaching the curve he had gone into a "daze", a sort of highway hypnosis.

The leader of the National Transportation Safety Board (NTSB) team investigating said it was likely that the accident would have been prevented had positive train control (PTC) been installed per a prior federal mandate requiring its installation by 2015. Due to a number of other recent accidents involving Metro-North trains and tracks, the Federal Railroad Administration (FRA) demanded improved safety measures, which Metro-North began implementing within a week of the accident.

In late 2014, almost a year after the accident, the NTSB released its final report on the accident. After reiterating its earlier conclusion that PTC would have prevented the accident entirely, it found the most direct cause was Rockefeller's inattention as the train entered the curve. There were other contributing factors. A medical examination following the accident diagnosed sleep apnea, which had hampered his ability to fully adjust his sleep patterns to the morning shift which he had begun working two weeks earlier. The report faulted both Metro-North for not screening its employees in sensitive positions for sleep disorders, and the FRA for not requiring railroads to do such screening.

== Background ==
The train involved in the accident was the second southbound Hudson Line train of the day, leaving Poughkeepsie, the line's northern terminus, at its scheduled departure time of 5:54 a.m. EST. It was powered by a GE P32AC-DM locomotive, capable of running on either diesel fuel or electricity from a third rail. Since Metro-North uses push-pull trains, it was situated at the northern, or rear, end of the train to minimize noise on the underground platforms at Grand Central Terminal in Manhattan, its final destination, where it was scheduled to arrive at 7:43. It carried about 115 passengers.

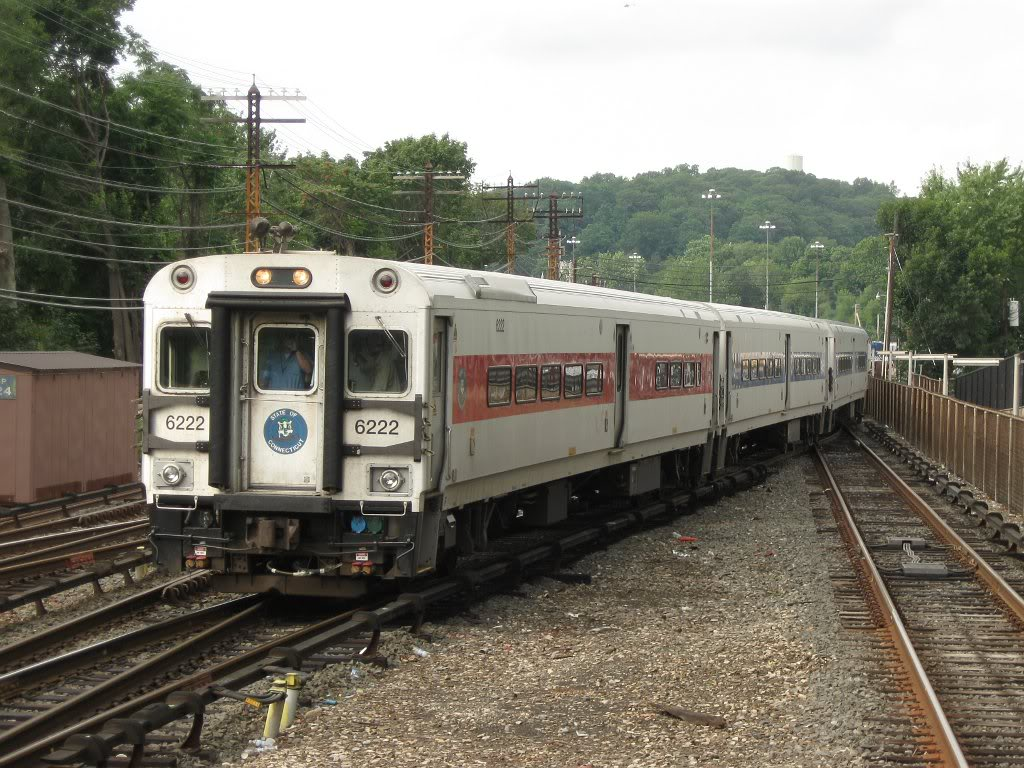
The lead train car involved in the derailment, pictured in 2009 leading a Harlem Line train into North White Plains

Engineer William Rockefeller, a 15-year Metro-North veteran who had started as a clerk in the stationmaster's office at Grand Central and then spent 10 years as an engineer, was operating the train from the cab car, at the front of a consist of seven Bombardier-made Shoreliner passenger coaches, in a mix of Metro-North and Connecticut Department of Transportation livery, (Note: The two agencies share equipment for operation on the non-electrified Danbury and Waterbury branches of the New Haven Line.) two of which were closed off and used only for deadheading by employees. He had recently begun working the morning shift after working afternoons, a change he later told investigators he had made reluctantly, requiring that he leave his home in Germantown, approximately 27 miles (43 km) north of Poughkeepsie, at 3:30 a.m. for work. To make sure he had adequate rest before his shift, he had gone to bed at 8:30 p.m. the night before following a nine-hour shift the preceding day. He had arrived at work on time after a 43-minute drive, after which he bought a cup of coffee and a hard roll, filled out paperwork and attended a standard safety briefing, followed by tests of the train's safety equipment. Another veteran employee, Michael Hermann, who in his limited time working with Rockefeller had praised the engineer's "very smooth" train handling to other Metro-North employees, was the conductor; his one assistant leaving Poughkeepsie was Maria Herbert, with whom he regularly worked.

Once underway in predawn darkness that gradually lightened to civil twilight, the train proceeded south along the two-track main line, also used by Amtrak for its Empire Service trains. From Poughkeepsie it continued through the mid- and lower Hudson Valley, often right next to the river. Under electromotor diesel power, it made all six of its scheduled stops in the upper, non-electrified portion of the Hudson Line in Dutchess, Putnam and Westchester counties without incident. After Croton-Harmon, the northern end of the line's electrification, where it picked up another assistant conductor, Chris Kelly, it was held up briefly. The next stop was Ossining, where it became an express, continuing under diesel power. (Note: Despite the presence of electrification, Metro-North's dual-mode trains use it only when they enter the Park Avenue Tunnel, since New York City bans the use of diesel locomotives in tunnels. Similar bans apply to the Long Island Rail Road, where diesel trains must also be dual-mode.) Between Ossining and the last stop, Tarrytown, just after dawn, Hermann and Herbert swept toward the center of the train, where they met briefly. After Tarrytown, with the train running only a minute behind schedule, they began returning to opposite ends of the train, taking seat checks from any passengers who might have boarded there. They were positioning themselves for where Metro-North's rules required them to be, so Herbert could join Rockefeller in the cab and call out signals after the last stop, Harlem–125th Street. Hermann, in the rear deadhead car with what he estimated to be six other employees, including Kelly, whom he had instructed to do so as the train's light passenger load did not require a third conductor, began doing his paperwork for the trip and preparing for his next.

The train continued south over the next 14 miles (23 km) on a straight set of four tracks next to the river, all with third rails, past the four stations along the line in the city of Yonkers, a permanent speed restriction of 50 miles per hour (80 km/h) through downtown was augmented by a temporary 60 mph (97 km/h) limit around Ludlow due to construction. South of that station the train entered the Bronx. About 1.5 miles (2.4 km) south of the Riverdale station, Rockefeller should have begun to slow the train down in anticipation of the curve immediately before Spuyten Duyvil station, below the Henry Hudson Bridge where the Harlem River Ship Canal flows into the Hudson across from the northern tip of Manhattan Island. Instead, he later said:

I [don]'t know how to explain it ... it was sort of like I was dazed, you know, looking straight ahead, almost like mesmerized. And I don't know if anybody's ever experienced like driving a long period of time in a car and staring at the taillights in front of them, and you get almost like that hypnotic feeling staring straight ahead ... I was just staring straight ahead ... [it was] that hypnotized feeling, dazed, that's what I was [feeling].

It was interrupted when, he felt, "something wasn't right with [the train]." Linda Smith, of Newburgh, who had boarded the train at Beacon with her sister Donna to see a choral performance at Lincoln Center, recalled that although she, too, was not fully awake, something seemed wrong. "It was bumpy and just seemed really at that point I was aware of going very fast." In the cab, Rockefeller initiated an emergency application of the brakes in an attempt to slow the train down, but it was already taking the curve.

== Accident ==
Map of derailment site, with cars shown in red

At 7:19 a.m. the train derailed 100 yards (91 m) north of the Spuyten Duyvil station, 11.4 miles (18.3 km) north of Grand Central, just after it had passed the junction with the West Side Line's crossing over the Spuyten Duyvil Bridge, where Amtrak's trains split off to go to Penn Station. In her passenger car, Linda Smith recalled the train turning sideways as the bumps she had felt gave way to bounces and seat cushions flew through the air. "It was like a movie going on around me." Debris entered the cars through the broken windows. Joel Zaritsky, a dentist from LaGrangeville headed to a convention, said it was like "severe turbulence on an airplane."

In the rear deadhead car, Hermann first heard "a little bit of like a metallic rattling," which was by itself not an unusual sound, but it just sounded a little bit odd." He recalled to investigators a day later that "the next thing I know my car had kicked and I was thrown from the fourth seat or across the coach up to the ceiling ... I dropped down. I went back up again and I slammed into the ceiling and then I slammed down into the floor." In the front, Herbert was sitting in the passenger seat behind the cab when "I looked up just to do what I was doing and a split second [later] I'm tumbling on the floor ... I think I hit the ceiling several times. I didn't even have time to react or to think what I was doing."

When the train came to rest, Hermann, despite a head injury and some bruises, took charge and reported the derailment to the dispatcher. He then worked with Kelly to coordinate the passengers and the emergency responders. In the front Rockefeller, who was mostly uninjured, freed Herbert, who was conscious but had also suffered a head injury, from the seat cushions that had piled up on her. Seeing that Hermann and Kelley had taken charge of the situation, he remained with her until he was taken to a hospital to be examined.

All seven cars and the locomotive left the tracks. Those in the rear remained next to the tracks; in the front, the cab came to rest just short of the Harlem River. Rockefeller, largely unhurt, got out and began aiding passengers. Linda Smith was one of the 61 injured in the accident, after she became trapped under seat cushions and unable to move. Her sister, whom she was travelling with, was thrown from the train and was one of the four killed in the accident.

=== Fatalities ===
Of the four killed, (Note: The four people killed were: Kisook Ahn, 35, of Queens; James M. Ferrari, 59, of Montrose; James G. Lovell, 58, of Cold Spring; Donna L. Smith, 54, of Newburgh) only one was found inside the train after the derailment; the other three were thrown from the train as it derailed. All had been sitting in the front three cars.

== Effects ==
=== Response ===
The New York City Fire Department sent over 125 firefighters to the scene to assist in the rescue. EMS workers were delayed getting to some victims while they waited for the third rails to be de-energized. All service on the Hudson Line was suspended as a consequence of the accident. The nearby West Side Line was reopened to Amtrak trains by 3 p.m. Survivors were taken to a family resource center set up at nearby John F. Kennedy High School; after all passengers were accounted for, it was closed in the afternoon.

=== Service and repairs ===
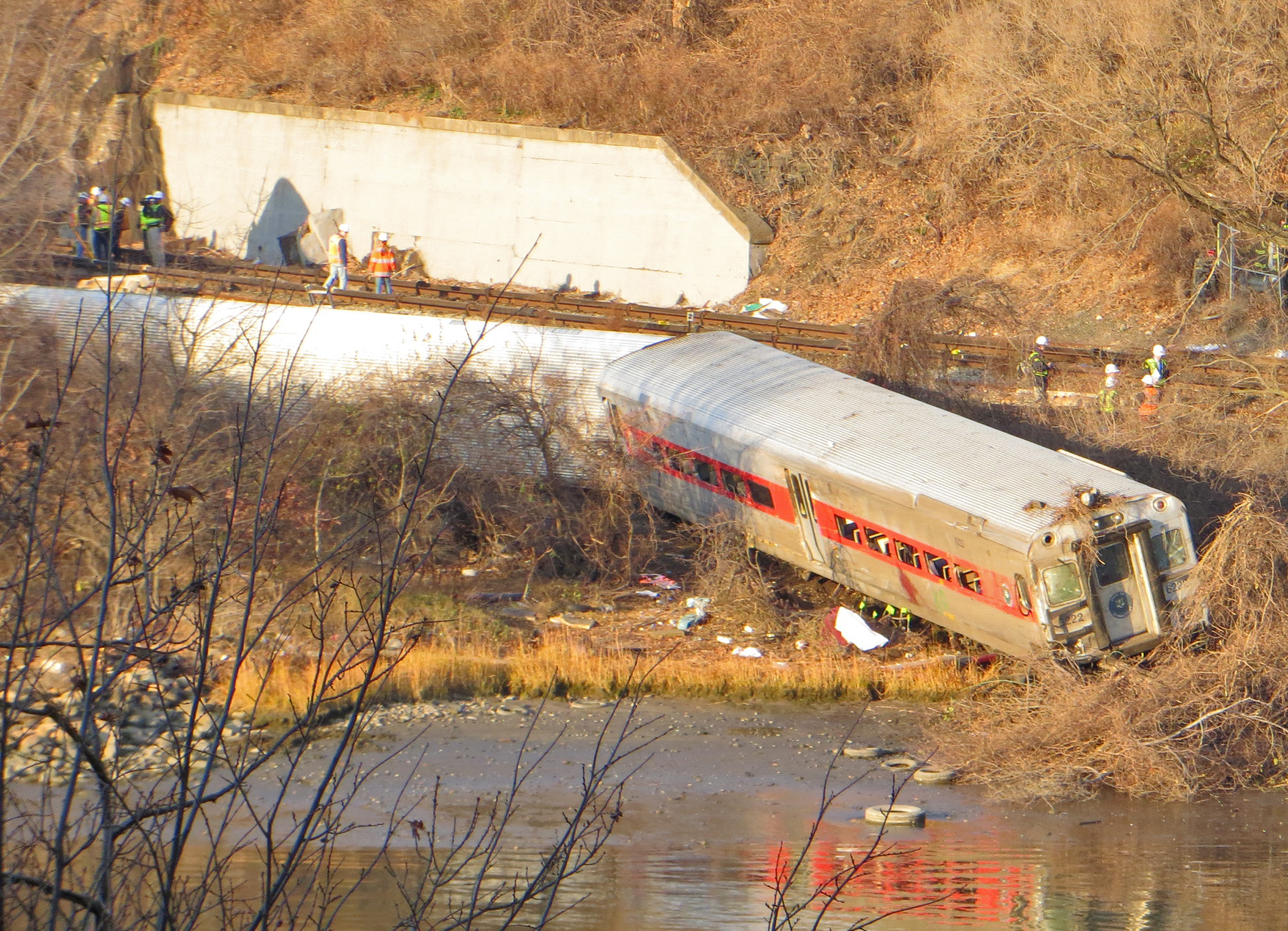
Wreck scene late that afternoon

For the day of the accident, Metro-North suspended all service on the Hudson Line south of Croton-Harmon. The next day, the first regular business day back from the Thanksgiving holiday, it restored limited service as far south as Yonkers, three stations north of where the derailment occurred, with shuttle buses providing service to the Van Cortlandt Park—242nd Street subway station, the northern terminus of the 1 train into Manhattan. Shuttle bus service was initiated between the Tarrytown station on the Hudson Line and White Plains on the Harlem Line. Westchester County offered free parking for the duration of the disruption in the lot it operates at the Valhalla station north of White Plains. Metro-North was not the only passenger railroad to experience service disruption. Amtrak, whose Empire Service trains follow the West Side Line tracks from the accident site to Penn Station, suspended all service between New York City and Albany that day, stranding college students and others relying on the train to return to school after the holiday. By the afternoon it had been restored, albeit with delays due to reduced speeds and activity in the accident area.

The disruption affected 26,000 people who commute to the city via the Hudson Line. Some commuters temporarily switched to buses, or drove themselves. Across the Hudson, Rockland County offered extra express bus service across the Tappan Zee Bridge to Tarrytown. Drivers noted a slight increase in traffic on the Saw Mill River Parkway as well.

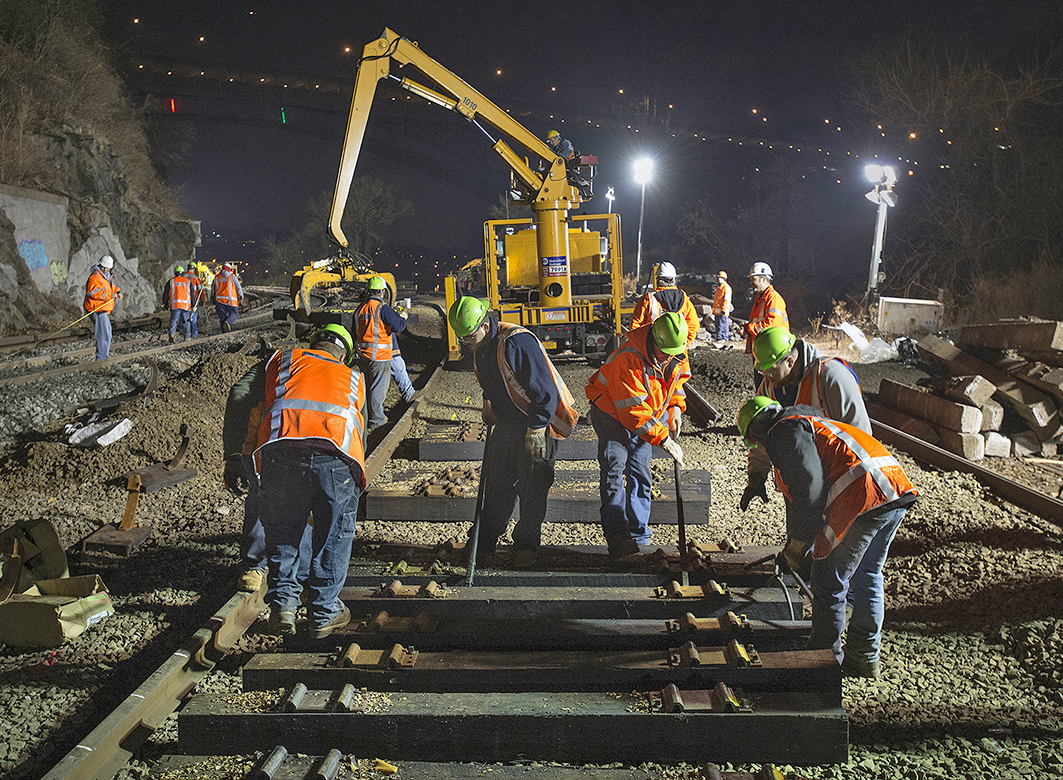
MTA crews working through the night to lay new track

The derailment caused $9 million in damage. MTA crews worked around the clock to remove the derailed cars and repair damage caused to the tracks when they left them. They spent the day after the crash replacing ballast and laying new concrete ties. By the evening of December 2 all the cars had been righted and restored to the track. They were taken to the Croton-Harmon and Highbridge yards, where the NTSB impounded them for further investigations. Crews siphoned 900 US gallons (3,400 L; 750 imp gal) of diesel fuel from the locomotive before removing it, then cleaned spilled fuel from the site with other special equipment.

Limited service on one of the three tracks of the Hudson Line through the accident site was restored on Wednesday morning, December 4. Separate trains were combined to make the service possible. Commuters waiting at Poughkeepsie on the first train to run the same route at the same time told a reporter that they were surprised that Metro-North was able to get the line cleared and the trains running again so quickly. Some even expressed sympathy for Rockefeller. While they said they had no fears of the accident recurring, and indeed some said it was safer than driving, one woman was surprised that there had been no fail-safe systems that could have prevented the derailment. "I really thought they had that in place. This is the United States."

== Aftermath ==
The derailment was the first accident involving passenger fatalities in Metro-North's 30-year history, and its first accident in New York involving any fatalities since a 1988 collision in Mount Vernon that killed one crew member. It was the deadliest train accident within New York City since a 1991 subway derailment in Manhattan. Two days later, Federal Railroad Administration (FRA) director Joseph Szabo sent MTA head Thomas Prendergast a letter highly critical of the transit agency. Earlier that year, he observed, there had been a derailment on the New Haven Line serving Connecticut and Westchester County suburbs along Long Island Sound, a CSX freight derailment on the Hudson Line on the very next curve to the south of where the Spuyten Duyvil wreck had occurred, on the other side of the Spuyten Duyvil station, and an accident on the New Haven Line that killed a track worker. These had led to five deaths and 129 injuries. "The specific causes of each of these accidents may vary," Szabo wrote, "but regardless of the reasons, four serious accidents in less than seven months is simply unacceptable."

Szabo asked the MTA for "a serious, good faith commitment to the safe operation of the system." He said it needed to tell employees what, specifically, it would do to improve safety. He requested an answer in two days. "Immediate corrective action is imperative." Metro-North announced the day afterwards that it would institute a telephone line where employees could confidentially report "close calls." Prendergast later replied to Szabo that the railroad had held mandatory safety discussions for 4,000 employees at 20 locations since the accident.

The accident spurred further discussion of positive train control (PTC), which might have prevented it. After a 2008 wreck in Los Angeles, the FRA mandated all American railroads implement PTC by 2015. Many resisted, complaining about the cost of the technology. Among those railroads were both MTA commuter railroads, Metro-North and the Long Island Rail Road, which have sought to have that deadline extended until 2018. In the wake of the Spuyten Duyvil derailment, U.S. Rep. Sean Patrick Maloney, a resident of Cold Spring whose neighbor James Lovell was one of those killed, introduced legislation to make low-interest loans and guarantees available so that commuter railroads like Metro-North could implement PTC. Eventually other congressmembers from the lower Hudson Valley joined as cosponsors. The deadline was later extended to the end of 2020. On December 23, 2020, the MTA completed its implementation, with all trains operating in positive train control.

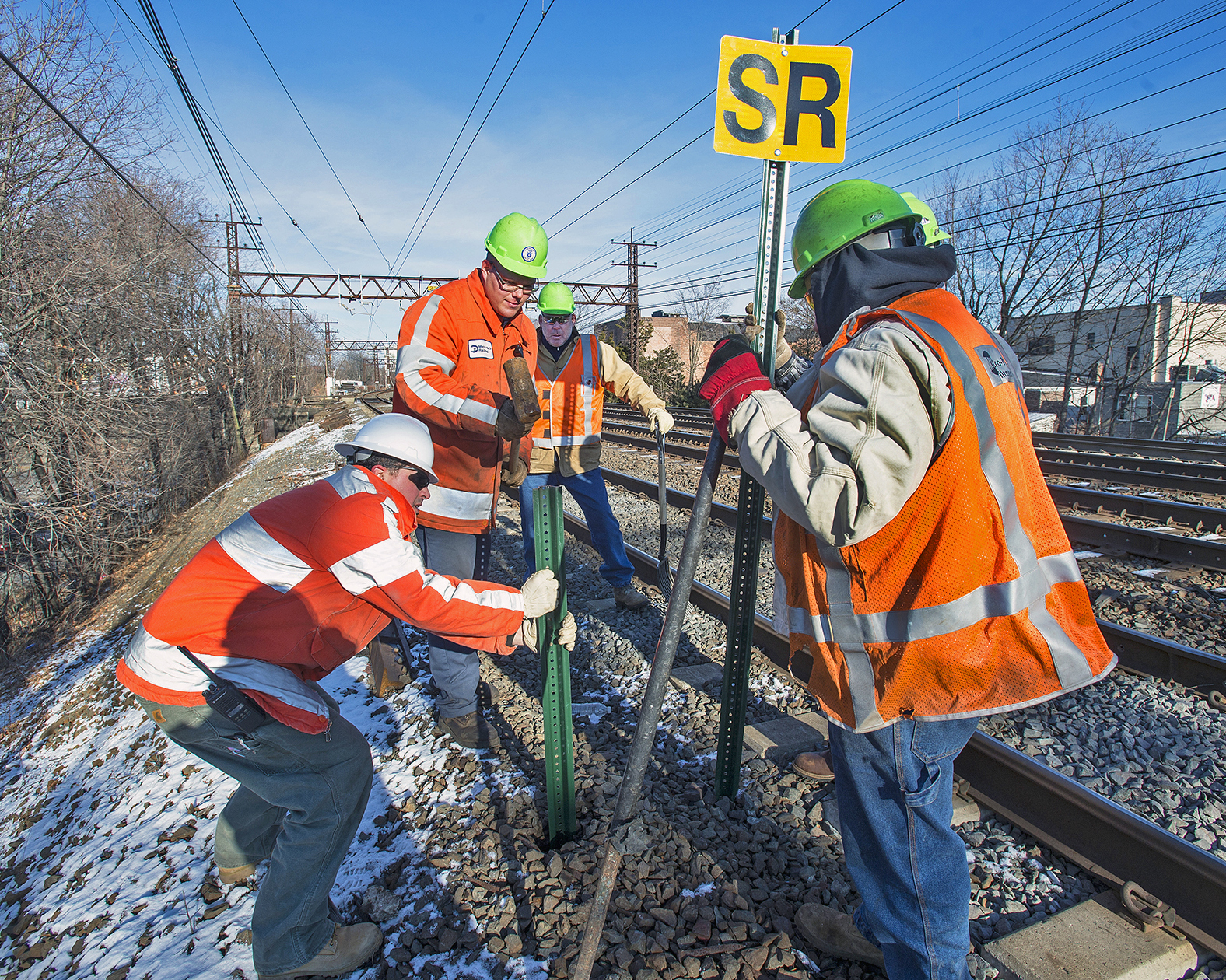
Metro-North crews install speed-restriction sign on a stretch of the New Haven Line two weeks after the Spuyten Duyvil accident

MTA officials denied that money was the problem, noting that they had budgeted $600 million of the total $900 million estimated cost of PTC installation. Instead they pointed to doubts about the technology's efficacy for large commuter rail networks. On a radio talk show following the crash, New York Governor Andrew Cuomo conceded that PTC is "controversial ... [some people say] it's not what it's cracked up to be." The MTA itself said it was "untested and unproven for commuter railroads [of our] size and complexity."

Several days later The New York Times reported that the train had a device known as an alerter. It sounds an alarm when the train exceeds speed limits for 25 seconds and shuts it down after an additional 15 seconds if no action is taken by the engineer. It might have been able to prevent the accident; however it was in the locomotive, at the rear of the train, not the cab where Rockefeller was located.

While Metro-North used it only to prevent collisions, rail safety experts said it could easily be configured to force trains to slow down at curves such as Spuyten Duyvil, since it relied on signals sent through the rails themselves. It was also preferable to the traditional dead man's switch the cab was equipped with, which requires constant action and attention from the engineer. The MTA said it was considering doing so at 30 sites on the Metro-North and LIRR networks. On December 6, the FRA issued an emergency order requiring Metro-North to have two qualified crew members in the cab at any point where the speed limit drops by more than 20 miles per hour (32 km/h) until it installs that technology in cabs and at those sites. The next day Metro-North announced it was upgrading the signals at the Spuyten Duyvil curve and several others in the system; it would also lower the speed limit going into the curve so that it would be a less-than-20-mph drop and thus the extra engineer would not be necessary. U.S. Senators Richard Blumenthal of Connecticut and Charles Schumer of New York called on Metro-North to install cameras to monitor both the track and the engineers.

On December 12, the FRA went further. It ordered "Operation Deep Dive," a full safety review of Metro-North, in which every aspect of its corporate culture would be evaluated by a panel of rail safety experts. This was the first time the agency had taken this extreme step since 2006, following a series of accidents involving CSX freights.

In mid-March 2014, the agency released its report to Congress on the results of Deep Dive. Metro-North, it said, had a "deficient safety culture." The FRA identified "three overarching safety concerns:

- An overemphasis on on-time performance;
- An ineffective Safety Department and poor safety culture; and
- An ineffective training program."

It directed Metro-North to submit a plan for addressing these issues to it within 60 days. That many of the railroad's employees had cooperated thoroughly with investigators was encouraging.

=== Investigation ===
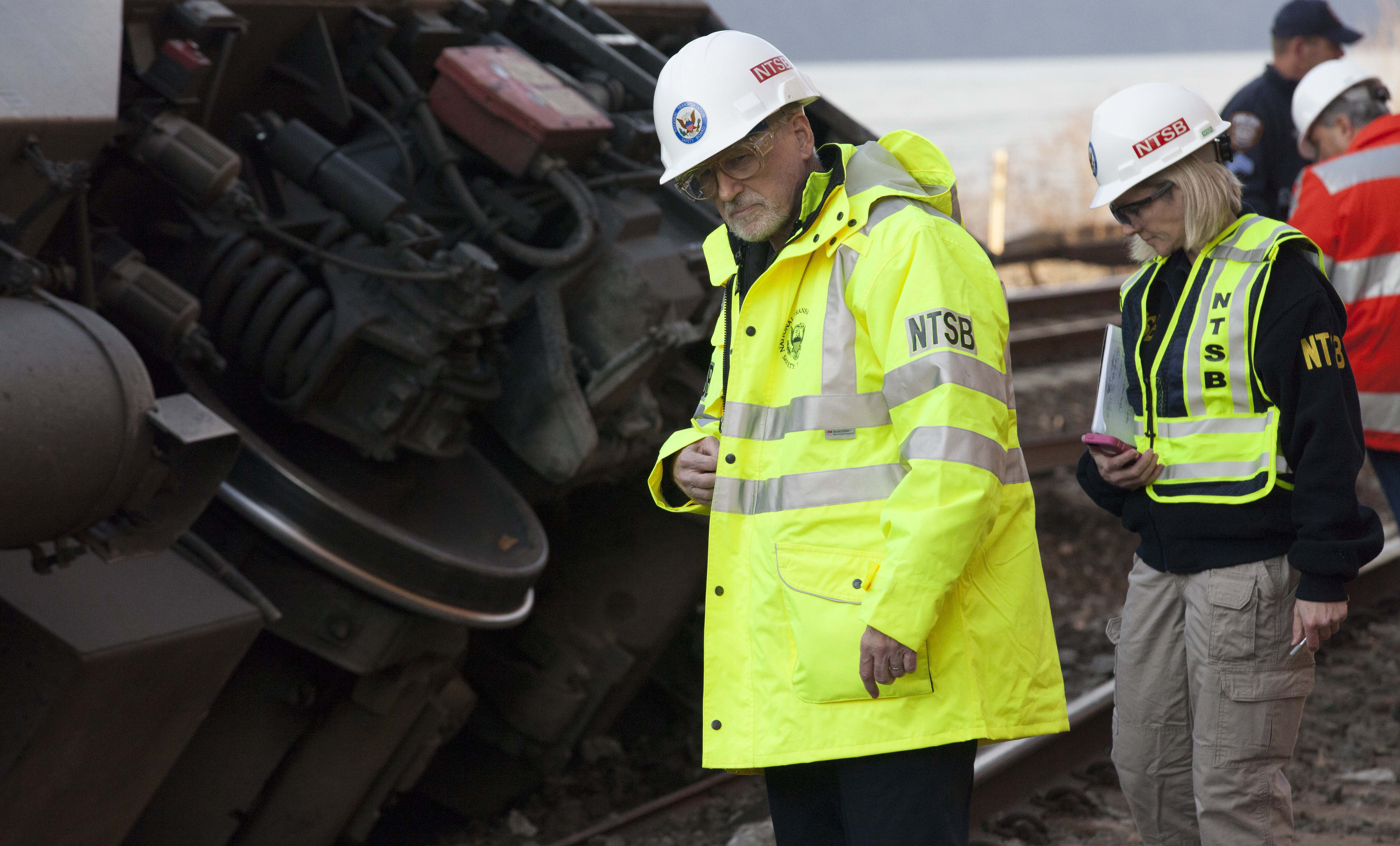
NTSB investigators inspect the site of the derailment

A team from the National Transportation Safety Board (NTSB) was dispatched to the scene of the accident to investigate. It found that the train's brakes had been deployed seconds prior to the crash and that the tracks had no problems. From the train event recorders, the NTSB determined that the train was traveling at 82 miles per hour (132 km/h); the speed limit for the section of track involved is 30 miles per hour (48 km/h). The brakes had indeed been deployed, but had reached their maximum level five seconds after the train entered the curve.

After being lifted from where they had come to rest and restored to the track, the cars involved were impounded by the NTSB and taken to Metro-North's yards at Croton-Harmon and Highbridge. Rockefeller surrendered his cell phone and submitted samples for drug and alcohol tests. When it was reported that his attention had lapsed prior to the accident, investigators announced that they would be assembling a timeline of his 72 hours preceding the accident to see whether they could find any explanation.

=== Cause ===
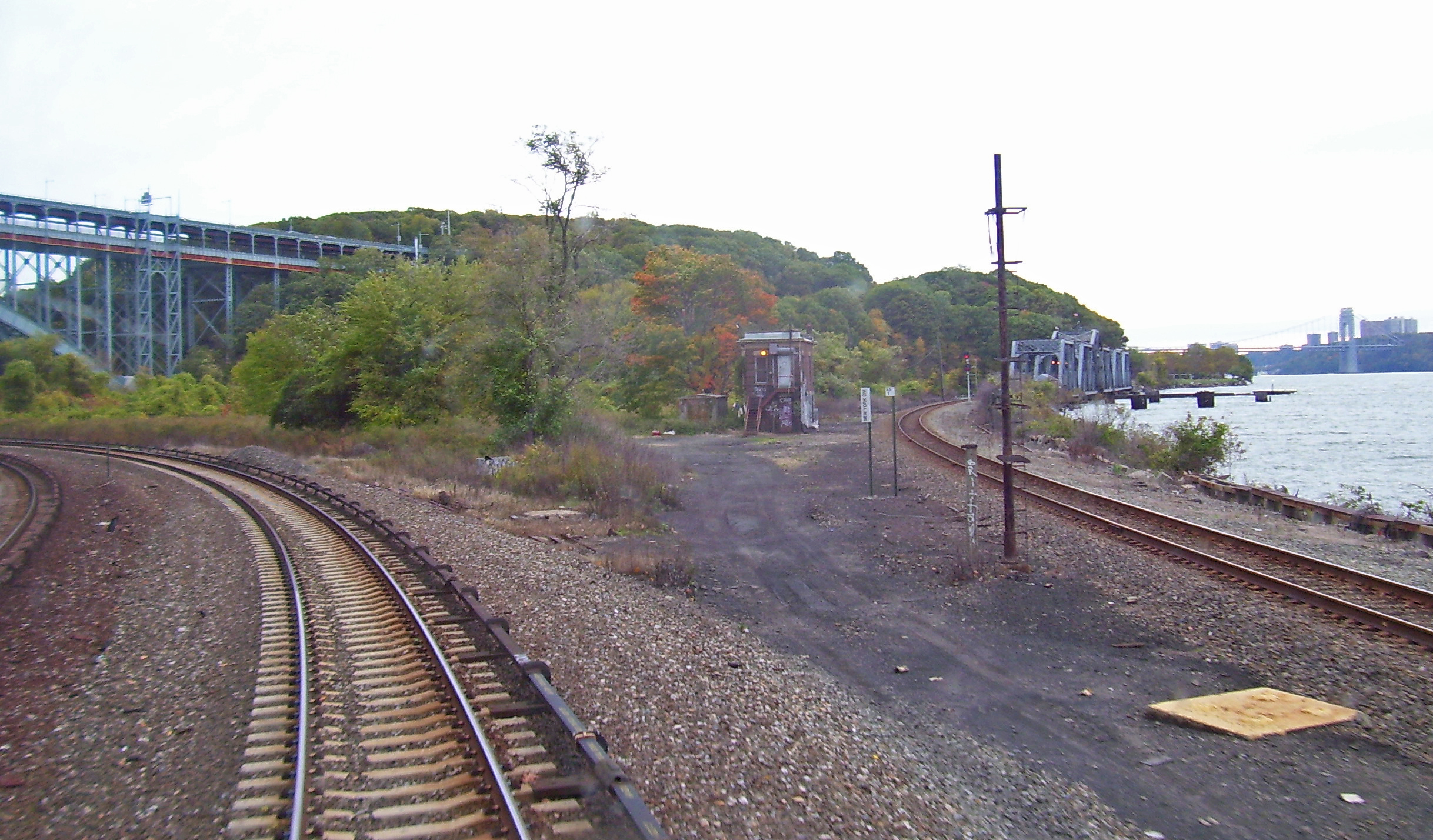
A 2007 photo of the junction of the West Side Line (right) and the Hudson Line, where the derailment took place

Early reports suggested that Rockefeller had claimed the brakes failed, although experts pointed out that that was unlikely since the brakes were equipped with a fail safe device that activates them should it detect a pressure drop. The NTSB soon determined that there was no problem with the tracks or the signals. Rockefeller's blood tests came back negative for both alcohol and drugs; his cellphone similarly was out of use at the time of the accident. But, he admitted when investigators were able to interview him, he had drifted into a "daze" until just before the accident when he tried to stop at the last minute.

Two days after the accident, Anthony Bottalico, head of the Association of Commuter Railroad Employees (ACRE), the Metro-North union, said that engineer William Rockefeller had "nodded off" before the accident. He likened it to white-line fever experienced by truckers. Rockefeller had recently started working the early shift instead of in the afternoons; however on the day of the accident he had apparently had adequate sleep and arrived at work on time from his home in Germantown, where he was seen to be alert and vivacious. Rockefeller's attorney confirmed the remarks. Shortly after Bottalico's comments, the NTSB barred ACRE from further participation in the investigation for disclosing too much information. A day later Rockefeller was suspended without pay.

In early April, federal investigators revealed that after the accident, Rockefeller had been diagnosed with severe obstructive sleep apnea, a complication of his obesity, which may have contributed to his loss of attention. His blood had also been found to have a small amount of chlorpheniramine, an anti-histamine commonly found in over-the-counter cold medications. Possible sedative effects require that those medications be contraindicated for use while driving or operating heavy machinery and include a warning to that effect on their packaging. While Rockefeller had initially denied taking any such medications to investigators, his lawyer said that would not justify a criminal charge, a step the district attorney's office said it was still considering at that point.

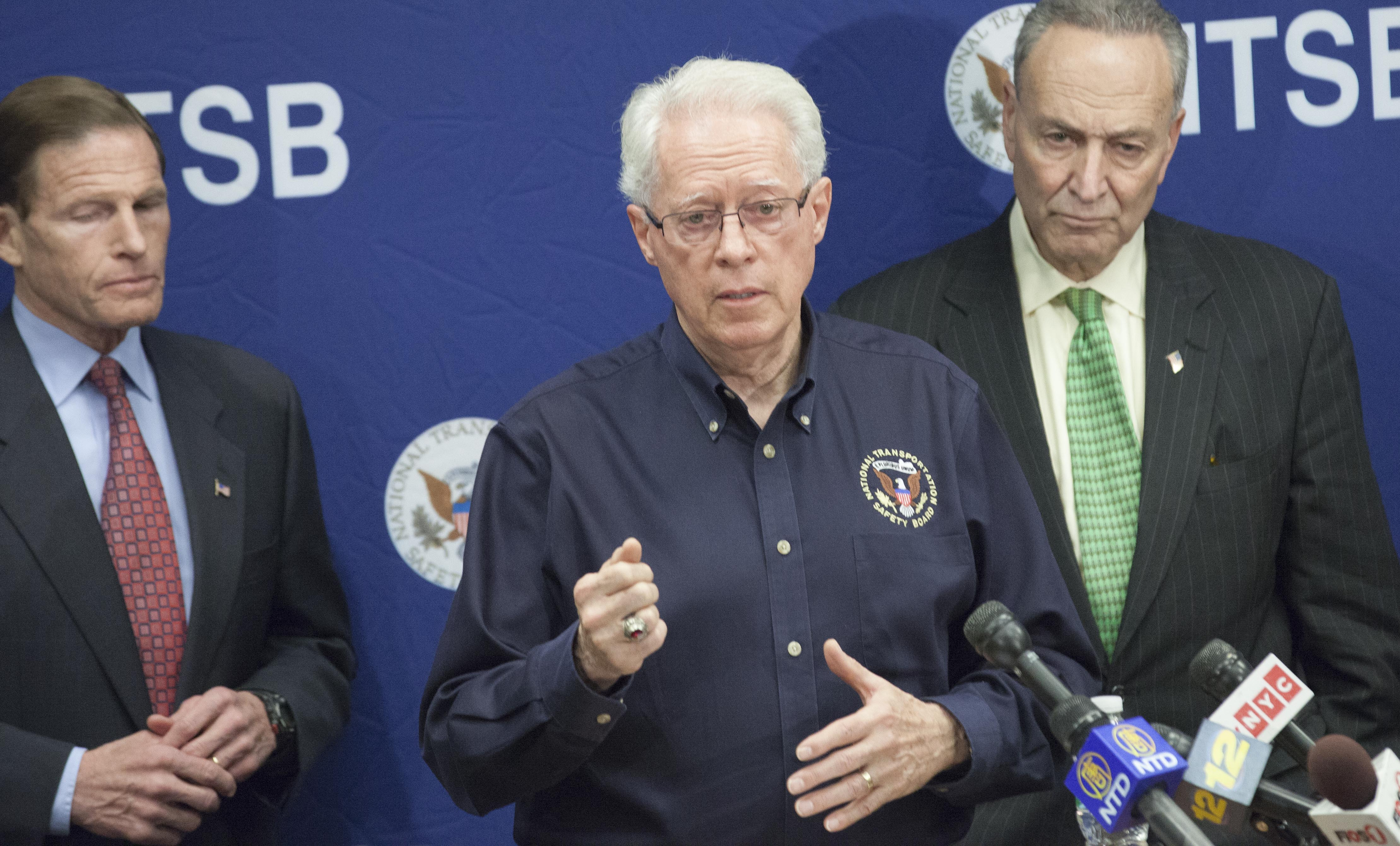
NTSB Board Member Earl Weener briefs the press on the derailment

The NTSB's final report, issued almost 11 months after the accident, reiterated many of its earlier conclusions that positive train control (PTC) would have prevented the accident by automatically applying the brakes in the curve, and that Rockefeller's sleep disorder was the likely reason for his loss of attention. It went on to fault Metro-North for not routinely screening for sleep disorders employees in positions defined by federal regulations as safety-sensitive, and the FRA for not requiring railroads to do so. Lastly, it said that the failure of the glazings, or the windows on the cars, contributed to the loss of life and severity of injury.

By 2020 Metro-North had installed PTC on the Hudson Line, as well as the Harlem Line in eastern Westchester, Putnam and Dutchess counties, accounting for 68 percent of its trackage. The railroad blamed the delays on difficulties experienced by the private contractors installing it.

=== Legal actions ===
==== Civil ====
Within a week of the accident, attorneys for several passengers had filed notices of claims, the first step toward filing a lawsuit, against Metro-North. Lawyers for a police officer riding the train to work said his injuries could prevent him from returning to duty and demanded $10 million. In 2018 he settled for $450,000; his attorney said he had also been suffering post-traumatic stress disorder from the accident. Denise Williams, a dentist headed to a convention in the city who required back surgery for a fractured spine after she was trapped under a heavy passenger car for several hours, also gave notice through her attorney, who questioned among other things why the railroad had not replaced hundred-year-old track near the derailment site.

Lawyers said it might be difficult for them to recover those amounts from Metro-North and the MTA if the cause of the accident turned out to be Rockefeller's lapse at the controls, since there would be far less liability on their part. New York law further limits potential damages in cases like these. Victims' lawyers said their goal was not so much the money but making sure the railroad installed PTC.

In early April, after the release of the FRA report, Eddie Russel, a New Windsor man who had been on the train, filed suit. He named the MTA, Metro-North, the city and Rockefeller as defendants, seeking $10 million in punitive damages. "One has to question whether the culture at Metro-North which led to the deaths of four people, should be investigated for criminal actions," said Russell's lawyer, who also faulted the MTA for not setting up a claims process in the wake of the accident, forcing those seeking compensation to litigate at increased costs both to themselves and the agencies.

In 2018 it was reported that Metro-North had paid out $60 million in claims related to the accident, making it the costliest in the railroad's history. Since that amount exceeded the limit per accident in the MTA's liability insurance, AIG was contracted to cover its future legal costs, as not all the claims and litigation have been resolved yet.

==== Rockefeller lawsuit ====
After Metro-North had initially denied Rockefeller a disability pension based on the PTSD he suffered from the accident, he appealed, and in late 2016, Metro North announced that he would receive $3,200 a month for the remainder of his life, in addition to a federal railroad retirement pension Rockefeller was awarded earlier that year. "The Pension Disability Medical Review Board reviewed the appeal and determined that Mr. Rockefeller is disabled from performing his function as an engineer and he is eligible now to receive his pension," the MTA said.

At the same time he received the pension, Rockefeller sued the MTA for $10 million in federal court, alleging the railroad had failed to install a system to alert engineers when the speed limit is exceeded. He argued that after another engineer had been suspended for two weeks in 2005 after speeding through the same curve in a manner that knocked passengers' belongings off the overheard luggage rack, the railroad had to know the curve was dangerous; one of its engineers suggested installing the automatic braking. Metro-North's executives declined, the engineer had said, fearing it would add almost a minute to travel time. Executives also believed it was better to rely at least in part on the engineer remaining alert, citing a 2009 accident on the Washington Metro that was attributed to putting too much trust in technology found to be dysfunctional at the time. At the time it became clear Rockefeller would receive his disability pension, his lawyer declined to comment on the pension award but said the lawsuit would continue.

The MTA countersued Rockefeller for the same amount, citing the cost of the damage resulting from the accident. In April 2019 the judge hearing the case dismissed the MTA's motion for summary judgement, ruling that Rockefeller had presented enough evidence that a juror could reasonably conclude his former employer was at fault. The railroad had in response introduced evidence from the train's event recorder that suggested Rockefeller had been driving the train erratically earlier on that run, at one point slowing to less than 50 mph (80 km/h) on a section where the speed limit was around 70 mph (110 km/h), and had told Herbert when the train left Poughkeepsie that "it's your job to keep me awake", an account Herbert had denied when prosecutors from the Bronx D.A.'s office asked her about it during their investigation. (Note: Herbert said that was ridiculous as she could not have prevented Rockefeller from suffering a medical emergency and held him blameless in the crash. Her lawsuit against the MTA over her injuries from the accident, in which she had made the same argument as Rockefeller, was settled for $835,000 in 2015.) Four months later, Rockefeller withdrew the suit.

==== Criminal investigation ====
The office of Bronx District Attorney Robert Johnson reviewed the evidence gathered to see whether criminal charges, which could be as serious as negligent homicide, were warranted against Rockefeller. While criminal charges have been filed against the operators of vehicles in other recent deadly transportation accidents in and around New York City, and convictions have often resulted, defense lawyers said in this case it would be difficult to find a credible offense, since Rockefeller was exhibiting no clear sign of negligence such as alcoholism or cell phone use, and operating a vehicle while drowsy is not necessarily a crime. In 2012, prosecutors argued that Ophadell Williams, the driver of a bus on which 15 passengers died on their way to a casino in Connecticut, had knowingly endangered lives by repeatedly driving without adequate sleep. A jury acquitted him of all charges except operating a vehicle without a license.

In May 2015, almost a year and a half after the accident, the Bronx D.A.'s office announced it would not be filing charges. "There was no criminality in the act, therefore no criminal charges," said a spokeswoman for Johnson, adding that he had made that decision several months beforehand. Rockefeller's lawyer, Jeffrey Chartier, said that since his client hadn't known of his medical condition, he could not be considered to be negligent. It was "the only logical conclusion", similar to what the NTSB had already found.

Chartier said Rockefeller was still suffering from post-traumatic stress disorder (PTSD) as a result of the accident. Linda Smith, whose sister Donna died in the accident, accepted Johnson's decision, saying it spared her the stress of having to relive the accident at trial, stress a similar recent Amtrak accident was causing her at the time. She felt it was punishment enough for Rockefeller to have to live with his role in the accident. "In a way, he's in jail forever, because he's got to live with this."

== See also ==
- List of American railroad accidents
- List of rail accidents (2010–2019)
- 1882 Spuyten Duyvil train wreck, collision that killed eight a mile down the line

=== Similar accidents ===
- 2015 Philadelphia train derailment, later accident involving an Amtrak Northeast Regional train that sped in a 50 mph curve more than twice that speed limit
- 2016 Hoboken train crash, later accident involving New York City-area commuter rail where engineer was diagnosed with sleep apnea, possibly explaining why he lost awareness going into a station
- 2017 Washington train derailment, also involving a train that went into a 30 mph curve at more than twice that limit
- Bourne End rail crash, similar accident in Britain where a sleep-challenged engineer may have momentarily lost attention and taken the train into a curve too fast
- Grantham rail crash, another British accident with a similar momentary lapse of the engineer's attention suggested as an explanation for why he disregarded signals and derailed the train by taking it into a misaligned switch
- Redondo Junction train wreck, worst rail accident in Los Angeles history, where engineer claimed to have "blacked out" before going into a curve too fast
- Newton, Massachusetts, train collision, in 2008, where the engineer's sleep apnea was also blamed posthumously for her inattention at a crucial moment
- O'Hare station train crash in 2014; may also have been caused by an overworked, sleep-deprived train operator
- 2016 Croydon tram derailment a similar accident caused by a driver undergoing microsleep while in command of a tram.

=== Other Metro-North accidents ===
- Fairfield train crash, May 2013, first major wreck in Metro-North's history
- Valhalla train crash, February 2015, killed six, deadliest accident in Metro-North's history
