= Bayonne Medical Center =

Coordinates: 40.6684°N 74.113°W

- Hudson Regional Health
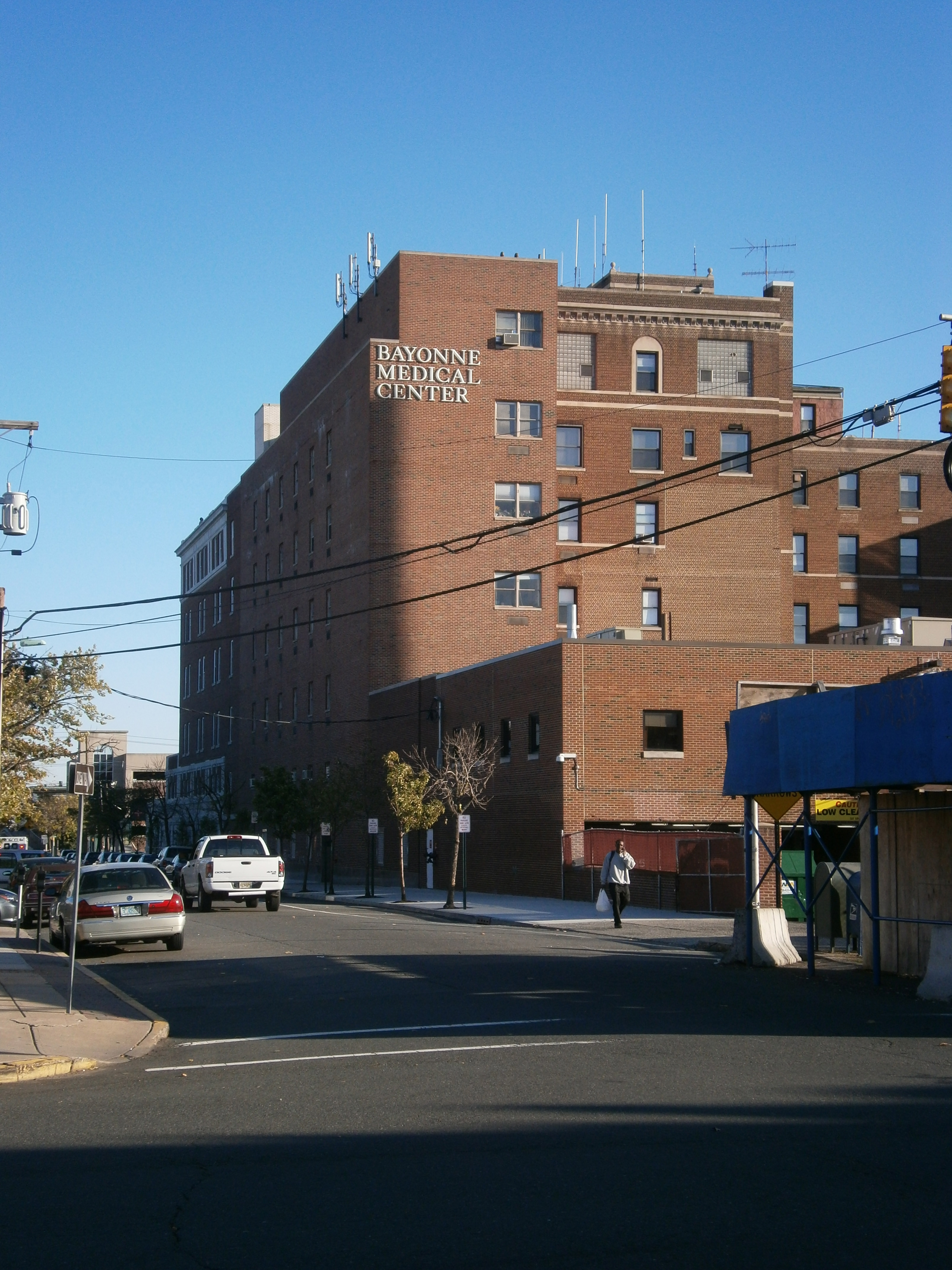

Geography
- Location: 29th Street & Avenue E, Bayonne, Hudson County, New Jersey, United States

Services
- Emergency department: Community perinatal center

History
- Founded: 1888

Links
- Website: http://www.bayonnemedicalcenter.org
- Lists: Hospitals in New Jersey

CarePoint Health Bayonne Medical Center is a hospital in Bayonne, New Jersey. It has 278 beds and was founded in 1888. One of six hospitals in Hudson County, the Bayonne Medical Center is affiliated with Hoboken University Medical Center and Christ Hospital, which are also operated by the for-profit organization Hudson Hospital Opco.

The hospital became the subject of media coverage in 2013 when, in the midst of nationwide controversy over inconsistent hospital charges, The New York Times reported that the hospital "charged the highest amounts in the country for nearly one-quarter of the most common hospital treatments", which the Times associated with its 2008 restructuring after being acquired out of bankruptcy the previous year. In the same year, the hospital was ordered to award a "whistleblower" $2.1 million for being fired.

According to a study conducted by National Nurses United and released in January 2014, the hospital was the 9th most expensive in the state, charging 763% above costs.

Bayonne Medical Center entered the national spotlight again in 2014, when an investigative news team at NBC 4 New York reported that the hospital charged a New Jersey teacher nearly US$9,000 to bandage his middle finger. In 2015 a follow-up investigation covered the story of a Bayonne resident who was charged over $17,000 for stitches on a two-inch cut.

The sale of hospital and the property on which it is located has been a matter of controversy. The city has considered eminent domain to settle the matter. In March 2023 it was transferred to the non-profit CarePoint Health system.

In November 2024, CarePoint Health filed for Chapter 11 bankruptcy protection, blaming high rising costs and lack of state funding from New Jersey. The company listed assets between $500,001 to $1 million, and liabilities of no more than $50,000. CarePoint plans to keep its hospitals operating as it invests $67 million in financing.

Since 2025, after the bankruptcy of CarePoint, the hospital has been part of Hudson Regional Health.
