= Waban station =

Light rail station in Newton, Massachusetts, US

Waban
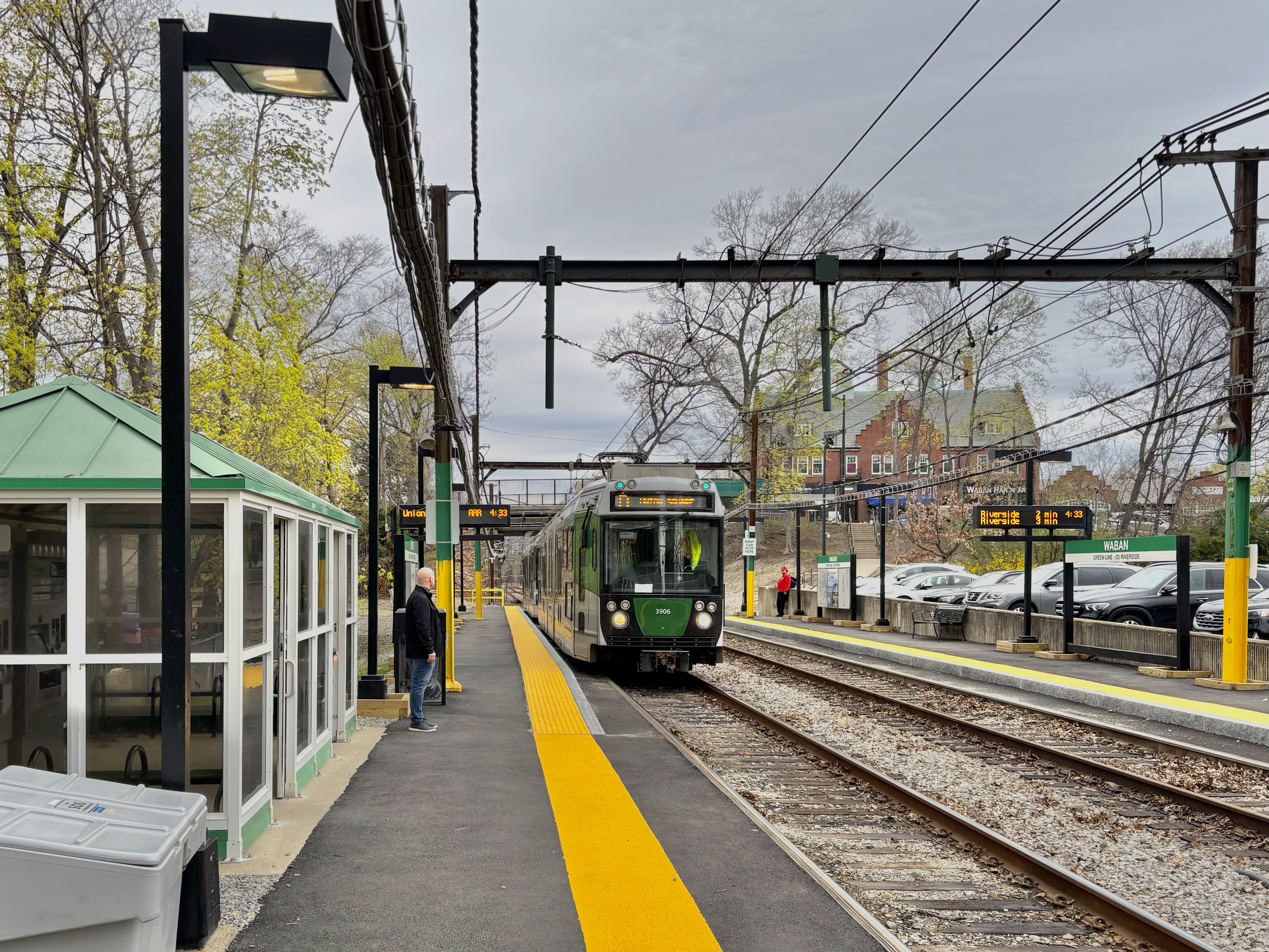
- An inbound train at Waban station in April 2025

General information
- Location: Beacon Street and Waban Square; Newton, Massachusetts
- Coordinates: 42.32569°N 71.23041°W
- Line: Highland branch
- Platforms: 2 side platforms
- Tracks: 2

Construction
- Parking: 74 spaces; paid
- Cycle facilities: 12 spaces
- Accessible: Yes

History
- Opened: July 4, 1959
- Rebuilt: October 2024; further work planned

Passengers
- 2011: 545 daily boardings

Services
Preceding station	MBTA	Following station
Woodland toward Riverside	Green Line D branch	Eliot toward Union Square
Former services
Preceding station	New York Central Railroad	Following station
Woodland toward Riverside	Highland branch	Eliot toward Boston
Location

Waban station is a surface-level light rail station on the Massachusetts Bay Transportation Authority's Green Line D branch, located just south of Beacon Street at Waban Square in the Waban section of Newton, Massachusetts. The station is located below grade; access to both platforms is via Wyman Street on the outbound side of the tracks or a stairway from Beacon Street. Waban station was made accessible in October 2024; additional reconstruction is planned. It is the least-used station on the D branch, averaging 545 daily boardings by a 2011 count.

== History ==
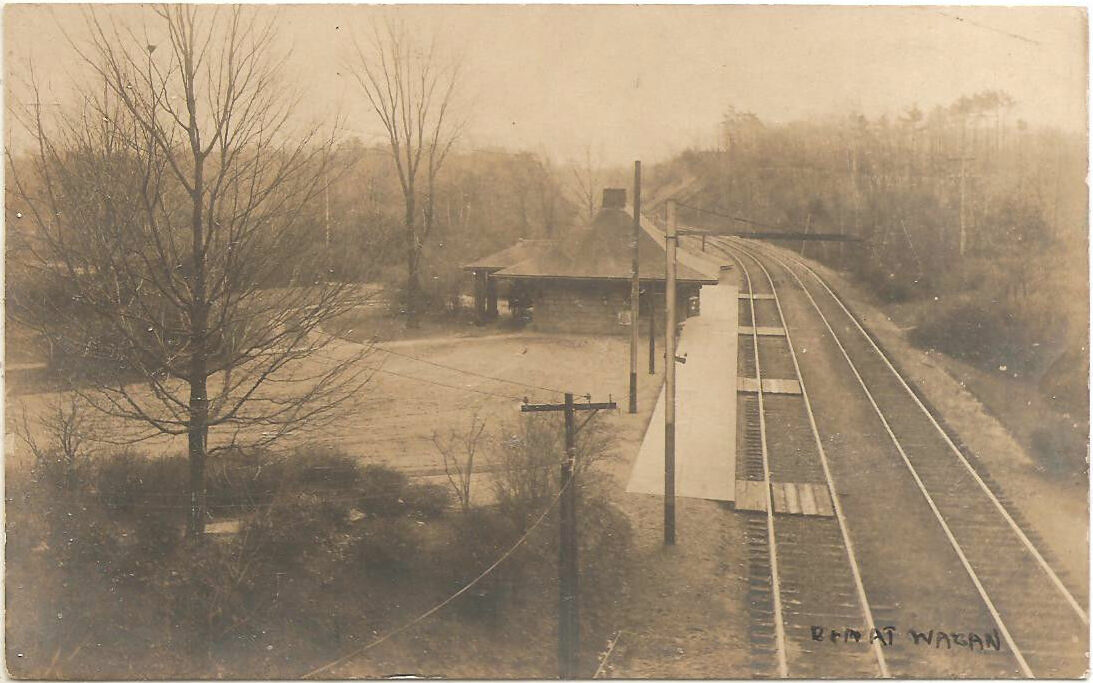
Waban station on a 1907 postcard

Waban formerly boasted an H.H. Richardson-designed train station, like those still standing in Newton Highlands and Newton Centre. The original station was completed in August 1886 as part of the Boston and Albany Railroad's Highland branch and was one of the last stations designed by Richardson before his death in April 1886.

In June 1957, the Massachusetts Legislature approved the purchase of the branch by the M.T.A. from the nearly-bankrupt New York Central Railroad for conversion to a trolley line. Service ended on May 31, 1958. The line was quickly converted for trolley service, and the line including Beaconsfield station reopened on July 4, 1959. The station was demolished. The M.T.A. was folded into the Massachusetts Bay Transportation Authority (MBTA) in August 1964.

The station has two MBTA ticket machines for reloading stored-value CharlieCards and buying CharlieTickets, as well one fare validation machine. All three are enclosed in a heated passenger shed near the center of the inbound platform. On May 28, 2008, two westbound Green Line trains collided between Waban and Woodland, killing one person.

=== Accessibility ===
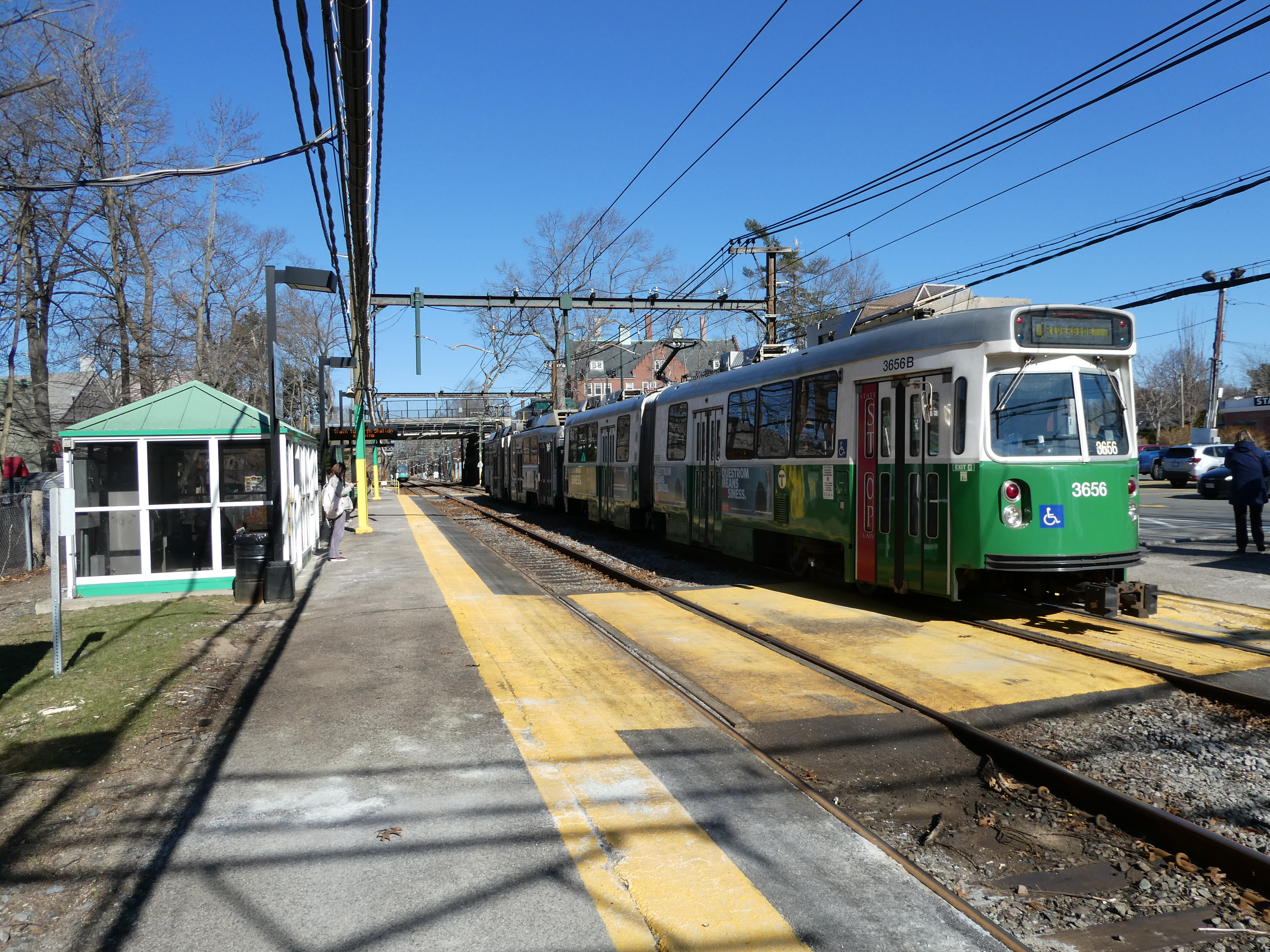
The station in 2022 prior to accessibility renovations

In 2019, the MBTA indicated that the four remaining non-accessible stops on the D branch were "Tier I" accessibility priorities. A preliminary design contract for accessibility modifications at the four stations was issued in February 2021. Design reached 75% in June 2022 and was completed late that year. Plans shown in March 2024 called for the platforms to be rebuilt in their existing configuration.

By November 2023, construction was expected to be advertised in early 2024 and begin midyear. However, in June 2024, the MBTA indicated that the renovations at the four stations would be done in two phases. The first phase added sections of accessible platform similar to those previously installed at Newton Highlands; some entrances were made accessible. Construction at the four stations took place primarily over the weekends of October 5–6 and 19–20, 2024, leaving them "generally accessible". By late 2024, full reconstructions were expected to take place in 2026–2027 to serve new Type 10 vehicles. As of December 2025, final design work is "pending determination of final scope".
