= Hudson Regional Health =

Hudson Regional Health (HRH) is a hospital system serving primarily Hudson County, New Jersey. It was created May 22, 2025, as the successor to CarePoint Health which went into chapter 11 bankruptcy in November 2024. At its creation, HRH incorporated four hospitals and more than 70 affiliated medical practices with about 1,500 physicians and 5,000 staff members. Its headquarters is located in Secaucus, New Jersey.

== Hospitals ==
- Hudson Regional Hospital
- Hoboken University Medical Center
- Bayonne Medical Center
- Heights University Hospital (closed 2026)
