= 2008 Massachusetts train collision =

2008 train collision in Newton, Massachusetts

Coordinates: 42.3288°N 71.2353°W

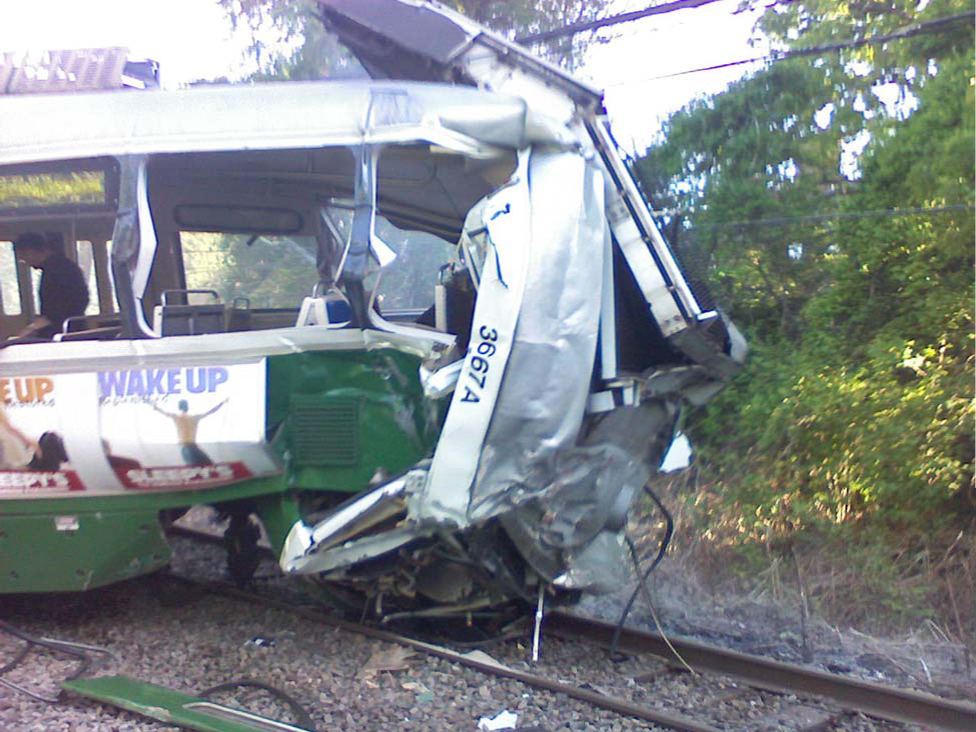
- Wreckage of Green Line car #3667 after the accident

Details
- Date: May 28, 2008 (18 years ago); 5:51 pm
- Location: Newton, Massachusetts, U.S.
- Line: Green Line D branch
- Operator: Massachusetts Bay Transportation Authority
- Incident type: Rear-end collision
- Cause: Micro-sleep episode caused by sleep apnea

Statistics
- Trains: 2
- Deaths: 1
- Injured: 14

On May 28, 2008, shortly before 6 p.m., two westbound MBTA trains collided on the Green Line D branch between Woodland and Waban stations, behind 56 Dorset Road in Newton, Massachusetts. While investigators examined reports of possible use of a cell phone by one of the train operators, the National Transportation Safety Board (NTSB) found that the operator of the rear train, Terrese Edmonds, had not been using her cell phone at the time of the crash, but rather went into an episode of micro-sleep, causing her to lose awareness of her surroundings and miss potential hazards up ahead. The collision killed Edmonds, and numerous others were injured. Fourteen passengers were taken to area hospitals; one was airlifted.

== Background ==
The Green Line is a light rail system run by the Massachusetts Bay Transportation Authority (MBTA) in the Boston, Massachusetts, metropolitan area. It is the oldest subway line in the United States. The Green Line splits into multiple branches; the D branch is a grade-separated, dual track line operating from a terminal station at Riverside to Kenmore station, where the D branch merges with the other Green Line branches and operates on shared tracks into downtown Boston. The D branch uses block signaling between Waban and Woodland stations; operating rules require that Green Line trains encountering a single red signal to hold for one minute, then proceed at no more than 10 miles per hour (16 km/h) past the red signal while being prepared to stop short of any train or other obstruction.

== Accident ==
The 2008 Massachusetts train collision occurred on the westbound track between Waban and Woodland stations. Trains 3667 and 3681 were both Green Line trains operating in the westbound direction on the D branch at the time of the accident. (Note: Each train consisted of two coupled Kinki Sharyo type 7 light rail cars. The NTSB's final report refers to each train by the number of its lead car (3667 and 3681 respectively), and the same convention is used for this article.) At approximately 5:50PM, Train 3681 departed Waban station, and passed signal H-64. Signal H-64 changed to display a single red aspect, to indicate that Train 3681 was directly ahead of it. Train 3681 then encountered a single red signal at H-66, and came to a stop. Per operating rules, Train 3681 held at signal H-66 for one minute, then began to operate past H-66 at a restricted speed, reaching a speed of 3.4 miles per hour (5.5 km/h) at the time of the accident.

Train 3667 departed Waban station westbound behind Train 3681. Although the red signal at H-64 required Train 3667 to stop and hold for one minute, an MBTA employee on the rear of Train 3667 told the NTSB that the train never slowed down after departing Waban, and instead accelerated to the maximum authorized speed of 40 miles per hour (64 km/h). Traveling at a speed of 38 miles per hour (61 km/h), Train 3667 crashed into the rear of Train 3681. The front of the lead car of Train 3667 suffered extensive damage, crushing the operating cab. The operator of Train 3667, Terrese Edmonds, suffered blunt force trauma during the collision and was killed; eight passengers were injured.

== Investigation ==
Initially, operator error was blamed for the crash. As the investigation began, the crash was suspected to be caused by distraction of Edmonds, who allegedly was using a cell phone while operating the train. However, the National Transportation Safety Board (NTSB) ruled out distraction after it obtained Edmonds' cell phone records and determined that her cell phone was not in use at the time of the crash. Investigators also found that the brakes had not been applied, and the tracks were not faulty.

The NTSB determined that an episode of micro-sleep caused by sleep apnea was likely the reason for the operator losing awareness of her environment.

== Aftermath ==
In 2009, the NTSB released its final report on the crash. The NTSB noted, "The following were neither causal nor contributory to the accident: weather conditions, equipment performance, track condition, crewmember use of alcohol or illegal drugs, crewmember use of cell phones, crew training and qualifications, or the performance of the crew of the struck train."

About a year later, a different crash on the Green Line was blamed on an operator texting while driving.

== See also ==
- List of American railroad accidents
- List of rail accidents (2000–2009)

=== Other similar accidents ===
- 2016 Hoboken train crash, where the engineer also has been diagnosed with sleep apnea afterwards
- 2016 Croydon tram derailment, another light rail crash caused by sleep apnea in the driver
- Bourne End rail crash, similar accident in postwar Britain where a sleep-challenged engineer may have momentarily lost attention and taken the train into a curve too fast
- December 2013 Spuyten Duyvil derailment, sleep apnea diagnosed in engineer afterwards blamed for his inattention at time of accident
- June 2009 Washington Metro train collision, similar accident in Washington, D.C. in which a stationary train was rear-ended by a train moving at just under full speed and the first car of the moving train telescoped over the last car of the stationary train.
