= Hudson Regional Hospital =

Hospital in New Jersey, United States

Coordinates: 40.7918°N 74.0733°W

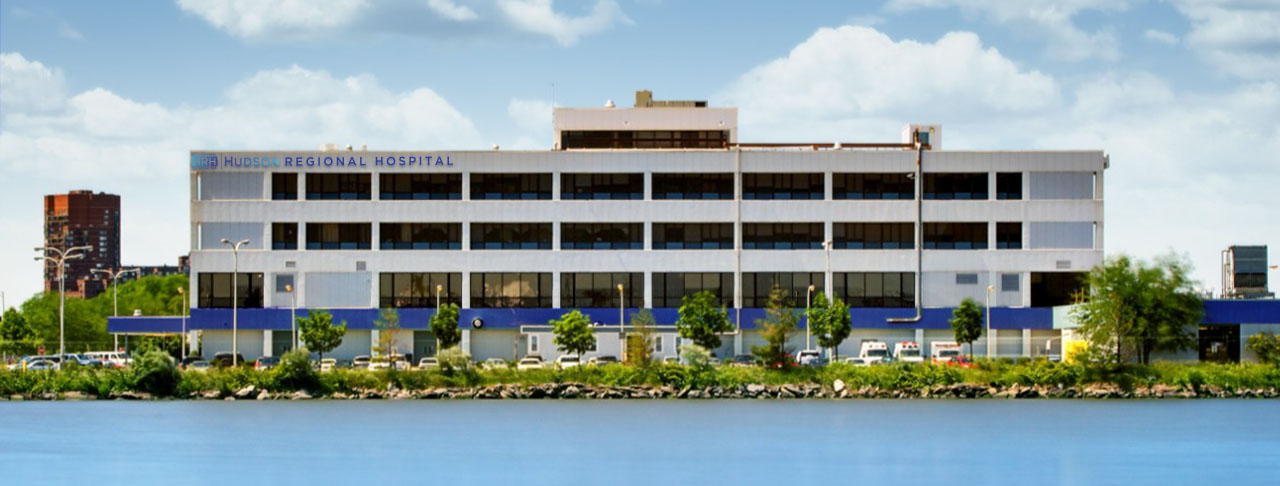
Hudson Regional Hospital

Hudson Regional Hospital (HRH) is a private, for-profit acute care hospital, located on the Hackensack River, in Secaucus, New Jersey, on Meadowlands Parkway near Route 3. HRH has a helipad for transporting injured persons from the scene of an accident to the hospital and/or for transferring patients in critical need of specialized services from HRH to another hospital having that capability.

== History ==
Established in 1976 by Dr. Paul Cavalli as a non-profit community hospital. It was originally Riverside Hospital, Meadowlands Hospital Medical Center. in 1986. It was purchased in December 2010 while near bankruptcy by MHA, LLC, owned by Richard Lipsky (a former anesthesiologist), Tamara Dunaev, Pavel Pogodin, and Anastasia Burlyuk.

Meadowlands Hospital Medical Center was purchased by Yan Moshe on January 1, 2018 and renamed Hudson Regional Hospital. On December 19, 2017 the state approved the sale of the hospital to Yan Moshe for $12.2 million. Moshe is real-estate developer who owns a surgical center in Hackensack. The new owner must continue to operate it as a general hospital.

Since 2025, HRH has been part of Hudson Regional Health.

== Accreditation ==
Hudson Regional Hospital is accredited by the international standard DNV-GL, the first and only accreditation program to integrate National Integrated Accreditation for Healthcare Organizations (NIAHO), the CMS Conditions of Participation with the ISO 9001 Quality Management Program (QMS).

== Technology ==
The policy of HRH is to publish technology only when it is implemented and in operation. Technology that is in the facility, but not in operation will never be published.

=== da Vinci Xi Robotic Surgical System ===
The da Vinci Surgical System is a robotic surgical system made by the American company Intuitive Surgical. Approved by the Food and Drug Administration (FDA) in 2000, it is designed to facilitate complex surgery using a minimally invasive approach, and is controlled by a surgeon from a console. The system is commonly used for prostatectomies, and increasingly for cardiac valve repair and gynecologic surgical procedures. According to the manufacturer, the da Vinci System is called "da Vinci" in part because Leonardo da Vinci's "study of human anatomy eventually led to the design of the first known robot in history."

Da Vinci Surgical Systems operate in hospitals worldwide, with an estimated 200,000 surgeries conducted in 2012, most commonly for hysterectomies and prostate removals. The "Si" version of the system costs on average slightly under US$2 million, in addition to several hundred thousand dollars of annual maintenance fees.

=== Mazor Robotics Renaissance Surgical Guidance System ===
HRH has added the Mazor Robotics Renaissance Surgical Guidance System to its spine surgery program and is the exclusive provider of Mazor Robotics in Hudson County. The Renaissance System, is cleared by the United States Food and Drug Administration (FDA) and CE-marked for both spine and brain surgery. The Mazor Renaissance System costs slightly under US$1 million in addition to annual maintenance fees.

=== Interventional Radiology ===
Interventional Radiology (IR), sometimes known as Vascular and Interventional Radiology (VIR), is a medical specialty which provides minimally invasive image-guided diagnosis and treatment of disease. Although the range of procedures performed by interventional radiologists is broad, the unifying concept behind these procedures is the application of image guidance and minimally invasive techniques in order to minimize risk to the patient. Procedures can often be performed on an outpatient basis. In most other cases, they require only a single overnight stay at the hospital—increasing convenience for patients and allowing them to return to their lives as soon as possible. Open surgery can require a patient to stay in the hospital for days or even weeks, which can cause stress and significant expense. HRH radiology specialists will provide treatments for urological and vascular problems, varicose veins and orthopedic issues, GYN/fibroid problems, certain kinds of cancer, and numerous targeted therapies.
