= Woodland station =

Light rail station in Newton, Massachusetts, US

Woodland
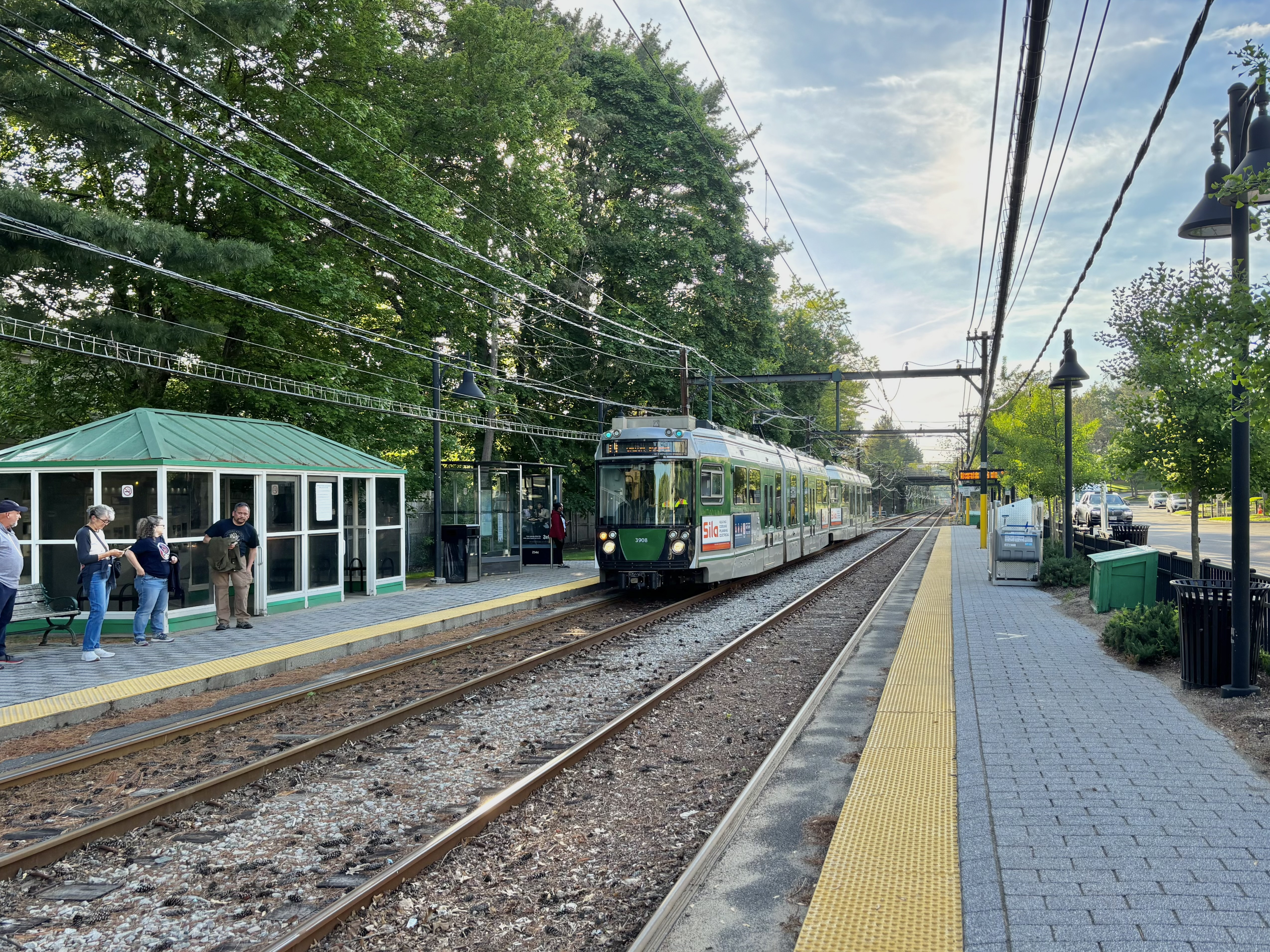
- An inbound train at Woodland station in May 2025

General information
- Location: 1940 Washington Street; Newton, Massachusetts
- Coordinates: 42.33288°N 71.24334°W
- Line: Highland branch
- Platforms: 2 side platforms
- Tracks: 2
- Connections: MWRTA: 201

Construction
- Parking: 548 spaces ($6.00 fee)
- Cycle facilities: 16 spaces
- Accessible: Yes

History
- Opened: September 1886; July 4, 1959
- Closed: May 31, 1958
- Rebuilt: March 2006

Passengers
- 2011: 957 daily boardings

Services
Preceding station	MBTA	Following station
Riverside Terminus	Green Line D branch	Waban toward Union Square
Former services
Preceding station	New York Central Railroad	Following station
Riverside Terminus	Highland branch	Waban toward Boston
- Woodland Railroad Station
- U.S. Historic district – Contributing property
- Built: 1886
- Architect: H.H. Richardson
- Architectural style: Richardsonian Romanesque
- Part of: Newton Railroad Stations Historic District (ID76002137)
- Designated CP: March 25, 1976
Location

Woodland station is a light rail stop on the MBTA Green Line D branch, located off Washington Street (MA-16) between the Newton Lower Falls and Auburndale villages of Newton, Massachusetts, United States. It serves as access to the Newton-Wellesley Hospital, as well as a park and ride station for nearby Route 128.

Woodland station was originally opened in 1886 by the Boston and Albany Railroad. The line closed in 1958 for conversion to light rail, and a new Woodland station slightly to the east in 1959. In 2006, the station was rebuilt for accessibility and a parking garage built as part of an adjacent transit-oriented development.

== History ==
=== Commuter station ===
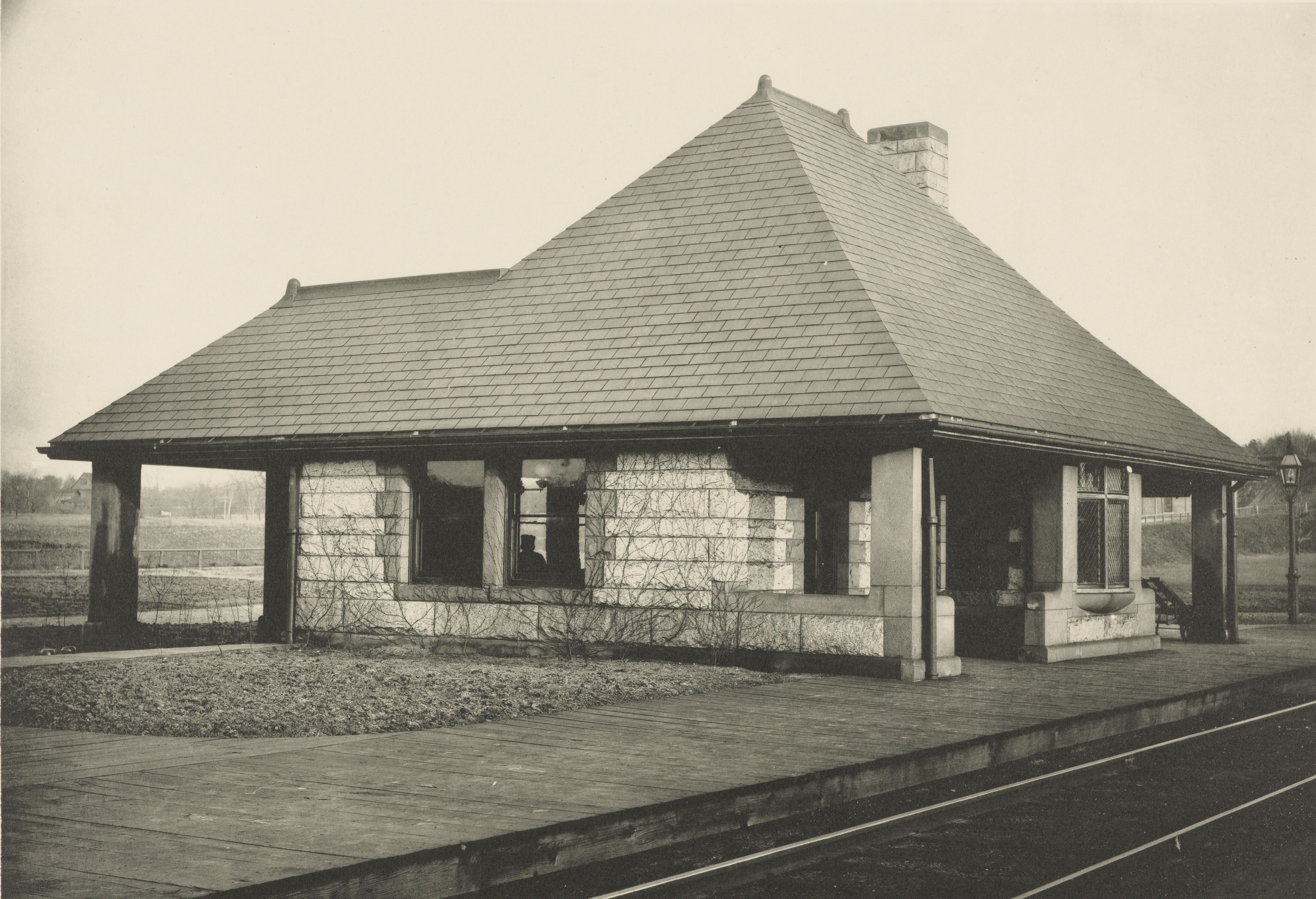
The Richardson-designed station shortly after construction

The Boston and Worcester Railroad opened a 1.4-mile (2.3 km) branch from Brookline Junction to Brookline on April 10, 1848. The Charles River Branch Railroad extended the Brookline branch to Newton Upper Falls in November 1852 and to Needham in June 1853. The Boston and Albany Railroad bought back the line, then part of the New York and New England Railroad, in February 1883. It was double-tracked and extended to the B&A main at Riverside; "Newton Circuit" service via the Highland branch and the main line began on May 16, 1886.

The B&A commissioned buildings from H.H. Richardson for three new stops at Boylston Street, Beacon Street, and Washington Street (later called Woodland) in October 1884. The three stations were built in largely unoccupied areas of Newton, and the attractive architecture was intended to bring in new residents who would become paying customers of the railroad. By this time, Richardson was in failing health; his successors Shepley, Rutan and Coolidge may have done most of the design work. Construction by the Norcross Brothers firm began in June 1886 – two months after Richardson's death –and finished that September. Similar to the other stations on the line, it was built in the heavy stone Richardsonian Romanesque style with a dominant roofline. The corners facing the tracks were cut back to serve as porches.

=== Conversion to streetcar service ===
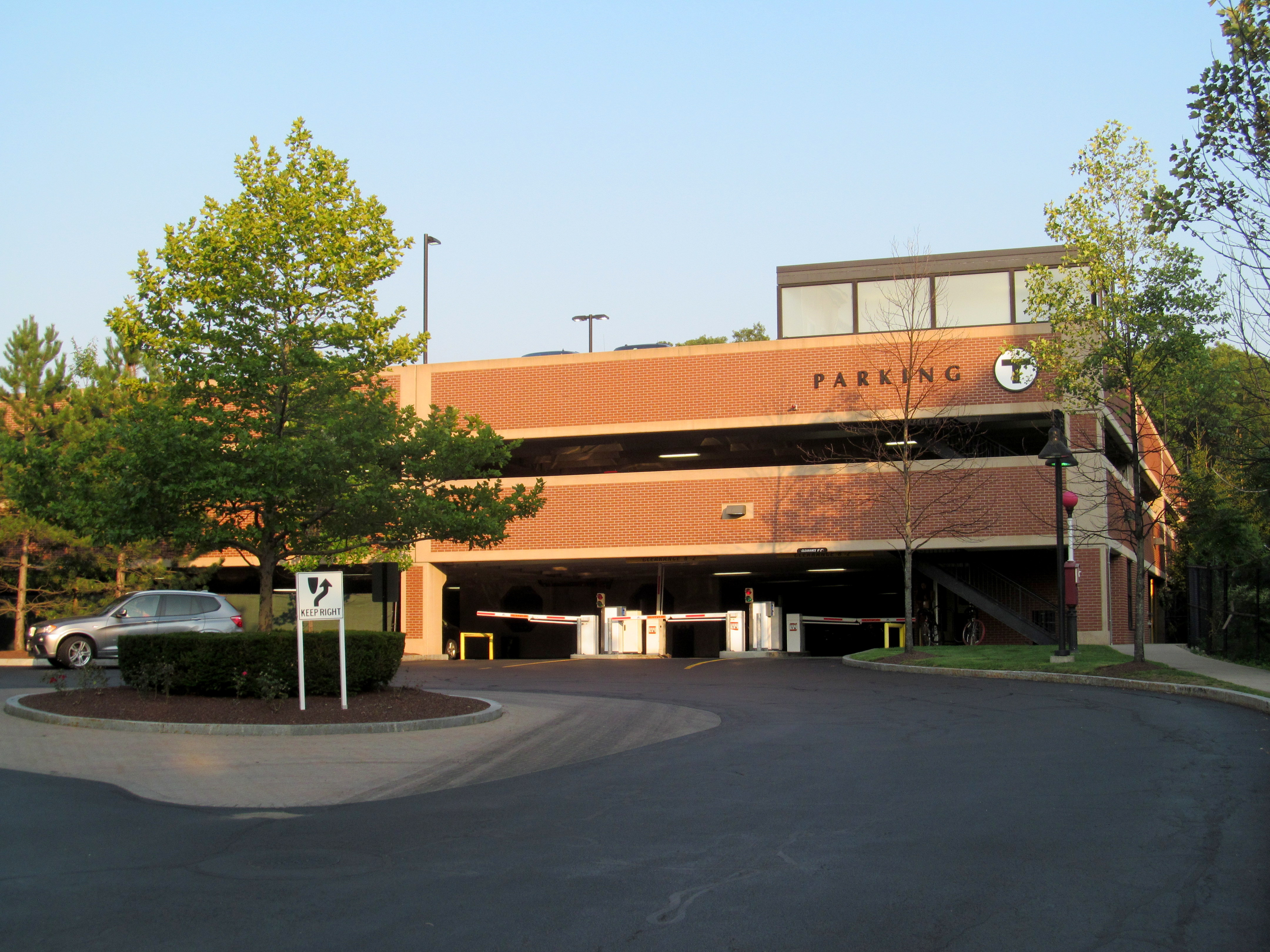
A 548-space parking garage opened in 2006

In June 1957, the Massachusetts Legislature approved the purchase of the branch by the M.T.A. from the nearly-bankrupt New York Central Railroad for conversion to a streetcar line. Service ended on May 31, 1958. The line was quickly converted for trolley service, with bare platforms and small shelters at each station. The new Woodland station was built somewhat to the east of the original station, as the latter was surrounded by a golf course with no room for a parking lot. Because of this, the station building was not torn down like most on the line were. The branch reopened with trolley service on July 4, 1959. The M.T.A. was folded into the Massachusetts Bay Transportation Authority (MBTA) in August 1964.

Woodland is one of only four of Richardson's B&A stations, and the only one of his Newton Circuit stations, to survive past the 1960s. It was added to the Newton Railroad Stations Historic District in 1976, but has fallen into disrepair. It sits on the grounds of the Woodland Golf Club, which uses it as a storage space.

In October 1997, Woodland was identified as a possible site for a parking garage to replace its 450-space surface lot. After numerous delays, the MBTA signed a ground lease agreement with a private developer in 2004. Under the terms of the agreement, the developer paid for the construction of a 548-space parking garage, accessible platforms, and entrance road to the station in exchange for rights to construct a transit-oriented development with rental apartments on the former parking lot. The new platforms and garage opened in March 2006; the Arborpoint at Woodland Station development broke ground in April 2006 and opened in October 2007.
