= Eliot station =

Light rail station in Newton, Massachusetts, US

Eliot
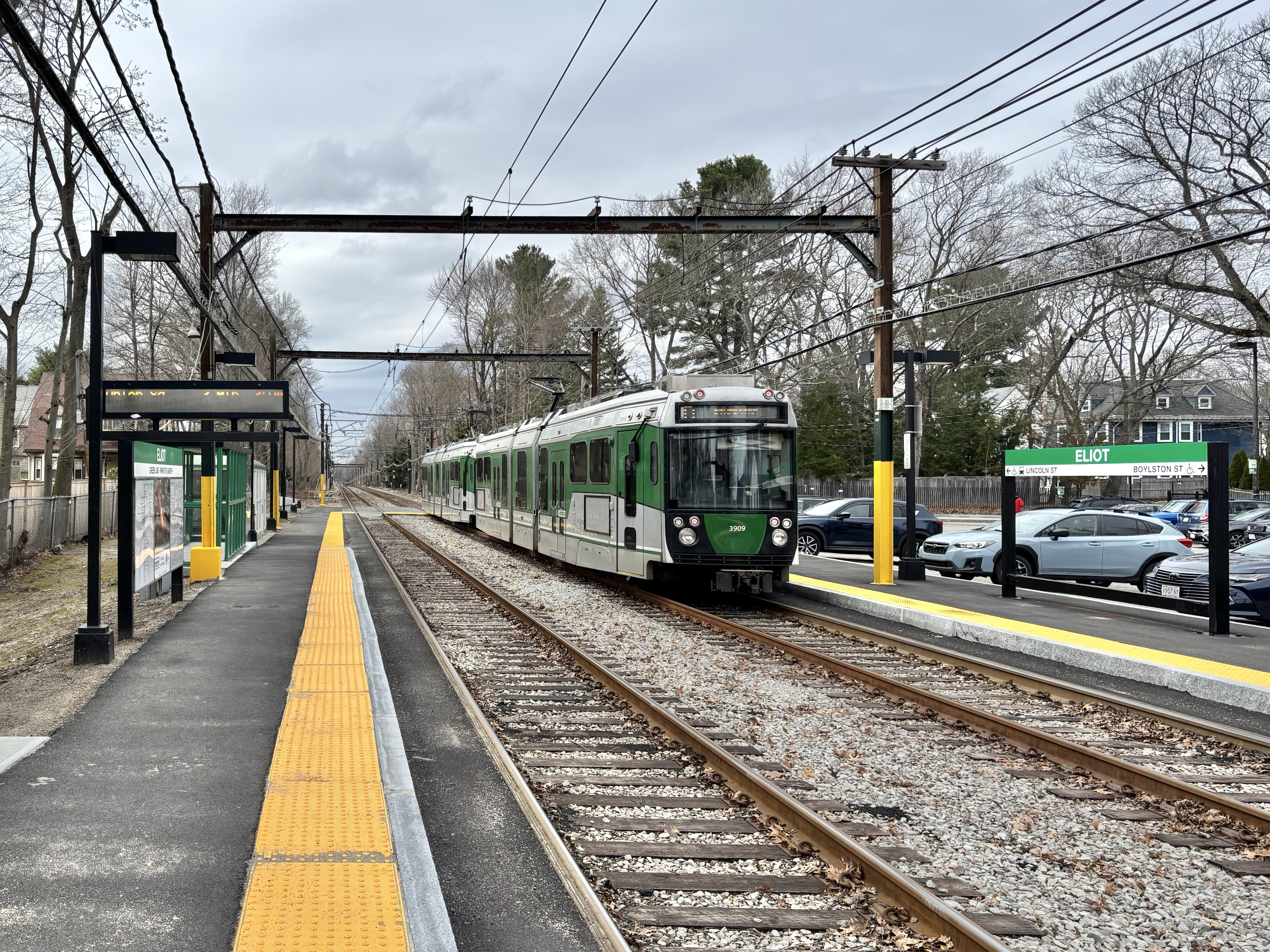
- An outbound train departing Eliot station in April 2025

General information
- Location: 248 Lincoln Street; Newton, Massachusetts
- Coordinates: 42°19′08″N 71°12′59″W
- Line: Highland branch
- Platforms: 2 side platforms
- Tracks: 2

Construction
- Parking: 55 spaces; paid
- Cycle facilities: 8 spaces
- Accessible: Yes

History
- Opened: July 4, 1959
- Rebuilt: October 2024; further work planned

Passengers
- 2011: 814 (weekday average boardings)

Services
Preceding station	MBTA	Following station
Waban toward Riverside	Green Line D branch	Newton Highlands toward Union Square
Former services
Preceding station	New York Central Railroad	Following station
Waban toward Riverside	Highland branch	Newton Highlands toward Boston
Location

Eliot station is a light rail station on the MBTA Green Line D branch located just north of Route 9 (Boylston Street) between the Newton Highlands and Newton Upper Falls villages of Newton, Massachusetts. The station has a parking lot at the end of Lincoln Street, a pedestrian entrance from Meredith Avenue, and pedestrian entrances from both sides of Route 9. A footbridge, built in 1977, crosses Route 9 adjacent to the railroad bridge. Eliot station was made accessible in October 2024; additional reconstruction is planned.

== History ==
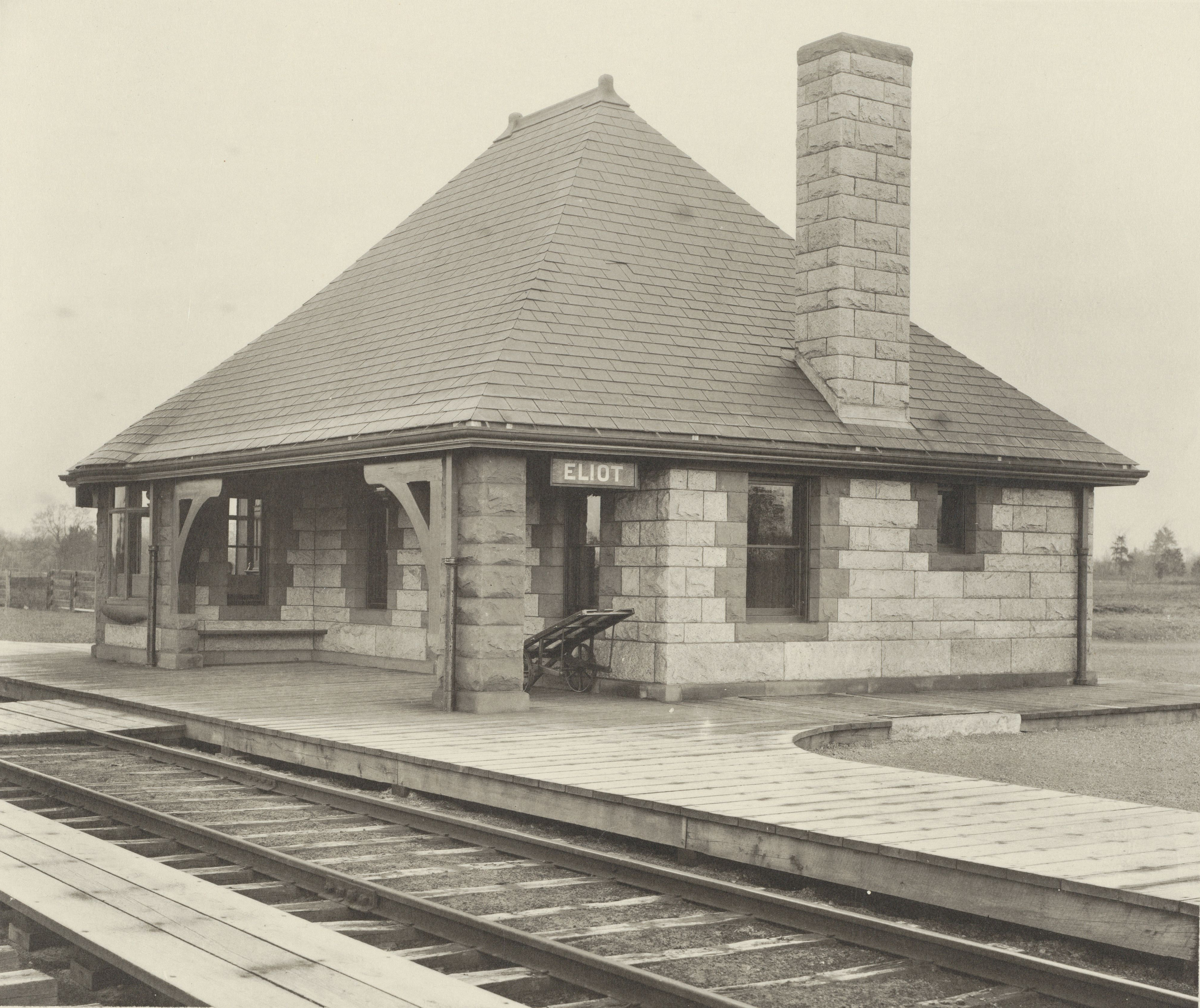
Eliot station around 1890

Eliot formerly boasted an H.H. Richardson-designed train station, like those still standing at Newton Highlands and Newton Centre. The original station was completed in late 1888 as part of the Boston and Albany Railroad's Highland branch and was one of the last stations designed by Richardson before his death in April 1886.

In June 1957, the Massachusetts Legislature approved the purchase of the branch by the M.T.A. from the nearly-bankrupt New York Central Railroad for conversion to a trolley line. Service ended on May 31, 1958. The line was quickly converted for trolley service, and the line including Beaconsfield station reopened on July 4, 1959. The station building was demolished. The M.T.A. was folded into the Massachusetts Bay Transportation Authority (MBTA) in August 1964.

=== Accessibility ===
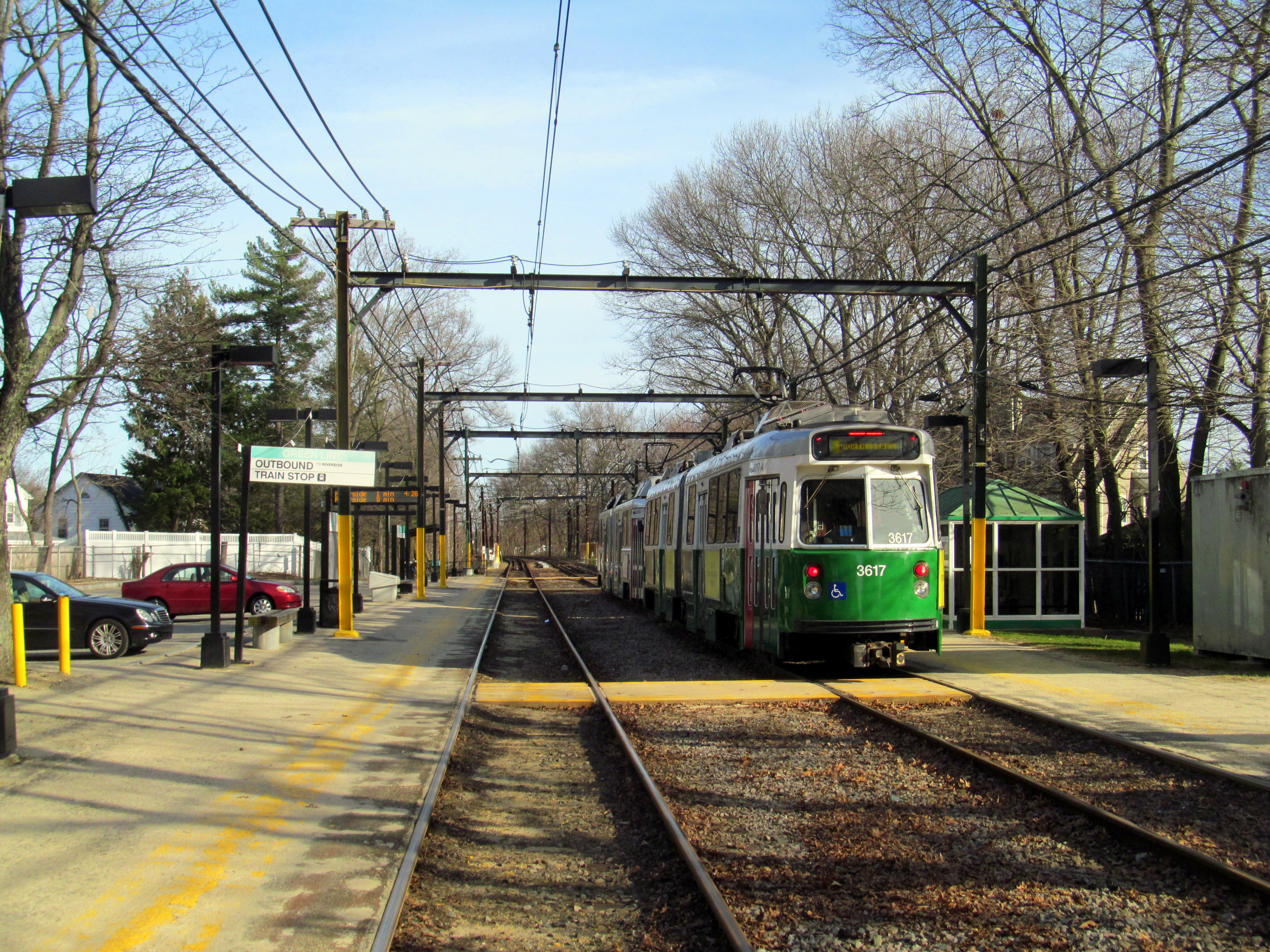
The station in 2016 prior to accessibility renovations

In 2019, the MBTA indicated that the four remaining non-accessible stops on the D branch were "Tier I" accessibility priorities. A preliminary design contract for accessibility modifications at the four stations was issued in February 2021. Design reached 75% in June 2022 and was completed late that year. Plans shown in March 2024 called for the platforms to be rebuilt in their existing configuration.

By November 2023, construction was expected to be advertised in early 2024 and begin midyear. However, in June 2024, the MBTA indicated that the renovations at the four stations would be done in two phases. The first phase added sections of accessible platform similar to those previously installed at Newton Highlands; some entrances were made accessible. Construction at the four stations took place primarily over the weekends of October 5–6 and 19–20, 2024, leaving them "generally accessible". By late 2024, full reconstructions were expected to take place in 2026–2027 to serve new Type 10 vehicles. As of December 2025, final design work is "pending determination of final scope".
