= Hoboken University Medical Center =

- CarePoint Health

Geography
- Location: 308 Willow Avenue, Hoboken, New Jersey, U.S.
- Coordinates: 40.741367°N 74.034054°W

Organisation
- Type: Community & Teaching
- Affiliated university: Hudson Regional Health

Services
- Beds: 333

History
- Opened: 1863

Links
- Website: www.hobokenumc.com
- Lists: Hospitals in U.S.

Hoboken University Medical Center is a community hospital located in Hoboken, New Jersey with 190 beds. It was founded in 1863 as St. Mary Hospital and operated under that name until 2007. The hospital was owned by Hudson Hospital Opco, known as CarePoint Health, an organization that also owned Bayonne Medical Center and Christ Hospital. Since 2025, after the bankruptcy of CarePoint, the hospital has been part of Hudson Regional Health.

The hospital is an academic affiliate of New York Medical College and was previously an academic affiliate of New Jersey Medical School.

== History ==
Hoboken University Medical Center was the second hospital to be established in the state of New Jersey. In 2013 it celebrated its 150th anniversary, becoming the state's oldest operating hospital. St. Mary Hospital was established on January 8, 1863, as a community hospital founded by the Poor Sisters of St. Francis. During the American Civil War the hospital treated returning wounded soldiers. The Sisters originally purchased five lots at Fourth and Willow Streets with money raised through donations. The Stevens family, through the efforts of Martha Bayard Stevens, donated additional land and endowed a St. Martha's Ward to the new hospital.

=== Early 1900s ===
One of St. Mary's more notable patients was New York City Mayor William Jay Gaynor, who was shot on August 9, 1910, as he boarded the SS Kaiser Wilhelm der Grosse at the Hoboken piers. The assailant was James J. Gallagher, who had been fired from his job in the New York City Docks Department and who blamed the mayor for his troubles. Gaynor was rushed to St. Mary Hospital where he stayed for over three weeks in critical condition before he was released. He lived for another three years, continuing to serve as Mayor, until his sudden death as a result of the attack.

=== WWI and the Great Depression ===
When America entered World War I in 1917, the Federal Government took over the operation of St. Mary Hospital. Since Hoboken was the main port of the New York Port of Embarkation through which nearly two million soldiers passed, the hospital became known as "Embarkation Hospital Number One." After the war, the Army returned the hospital to the Franciscan Sisters. In 1927, St. Mary opened one of the first tuberculosis (TB) clinics in the State. During the Great Depression, the Sisters opened a soup kitchen that fed 200 to 300 people twice a day. This facility remained open for many years.

== Clinical Services ==
Care facilities at the hospital include Emergency Services, Oncology, Orthopedic, Hemodialysis, Obstetrics, Nuclear Medicine, Rehab/Physical therapy, ICU, Psychiatry, Skilled Nursing, and Inpatient Surgery/Robotic surgery. The hospital received awards in excellence for Labor and Delivery in 2021 for superior clinical care of women during and after childbirth.

Hoboken University Medical Center is one of 332 national US hospitals with the lowest CAUTI rates (catheter associated urinary tract infections) from data collected in 2019.

In 2022, CarePoint Health announced an agreement with Columbia University Vagelos College of Physicians and Surgeons to provide access to premiere colorectal surgeons.

Accredited Services include the CarePoint Health Sleep Center, Primary Stroke Center, and School of Radiation.

March 2022 an emergency physician employed by Carepoint Health at HUMC was arrested and charged with numerous drug offenses as per the Hudson County Prosecutor's Office Narcotics Task Force, the Drug Enforcement Administration and the Hoboken Police Department.

== Awards and recognition ==
Hoboken University Medical Center has earned the Joint Commission's Gold Seal of Approval for Hospital Accreditation.

== Graduate Medical Education ==
The hospital is a teaching site and trains 44 interns/residents per year in total. Its Family Medicine residency program has been accredited since 1982 by the Accreditation Council for Graduate Medical Education (ACGME) and provides full-scope training with an emphasis on obstetrics and primary preventive care. The hospital also provides training for rotating medical students.

== Acquisition by Bon Secours ==
After nearly 140 years of operation, St. Mary Hospital was sold to the Bon Secours Health System, Inc. in 2000 by the Franciscan Sisters of the Poor, who had split off from the German congregation. That following year, Bon Secours formed a partnership with Canterbury Health, a company that owned the Episcopalian-affiliated Christ Hospital in Jersey City at the time. The union ended on December 31, 2004, however, after Canterbury claimed that Bon Secours had not disclosed the true financial health of St. Francis Hospital in Jersey City (which had also been founded by the Franciscan Sisters of the Poor in 1864 and had been sold to the Bon Secours System at the same time) as well as that of St. Mary.

== Acquisition by CarePoint Health ==
The Bon Secours Health Care System was unable to stem the financial losses in operating the facility. They worked out an agreement with the City of Hoboken to purchase the hospital and assume all its debts. This occurred in 2007, at which time the hospital was renamed to the one it currently has. The hospital was sold again in 2011 after it appeared that the City of Hoboken would become liable for $52 million in bonds which it had floated to keep the hospital open. CarePoint Health has announced that it would transition the hospital into a non-profit in 2021. CarePoint Health is led by CEO and neonatal cardiac surgeon Dr. Achintya Moulick, MD, MBA. The transfer to CarePoint Health received regulatory approval in March 2023.

In November 2024, CarePoint Health filed for Chapter 11 bankruptcy protection, blaming high rising costs and lack of state funding from New Jersey. The company listed assets between $500,001 to $1 million, and liabilities of no more than $50,000. CarePoint plans to keep its hospitals operating as it invests $67 million in financing.

== Acquisition by Hudson Regional Health ==
HRH took over four hospitals in Hudson County, along with their affiliates, in May 2025.
