= Heights University Hospital =

- Hudson Regional Health
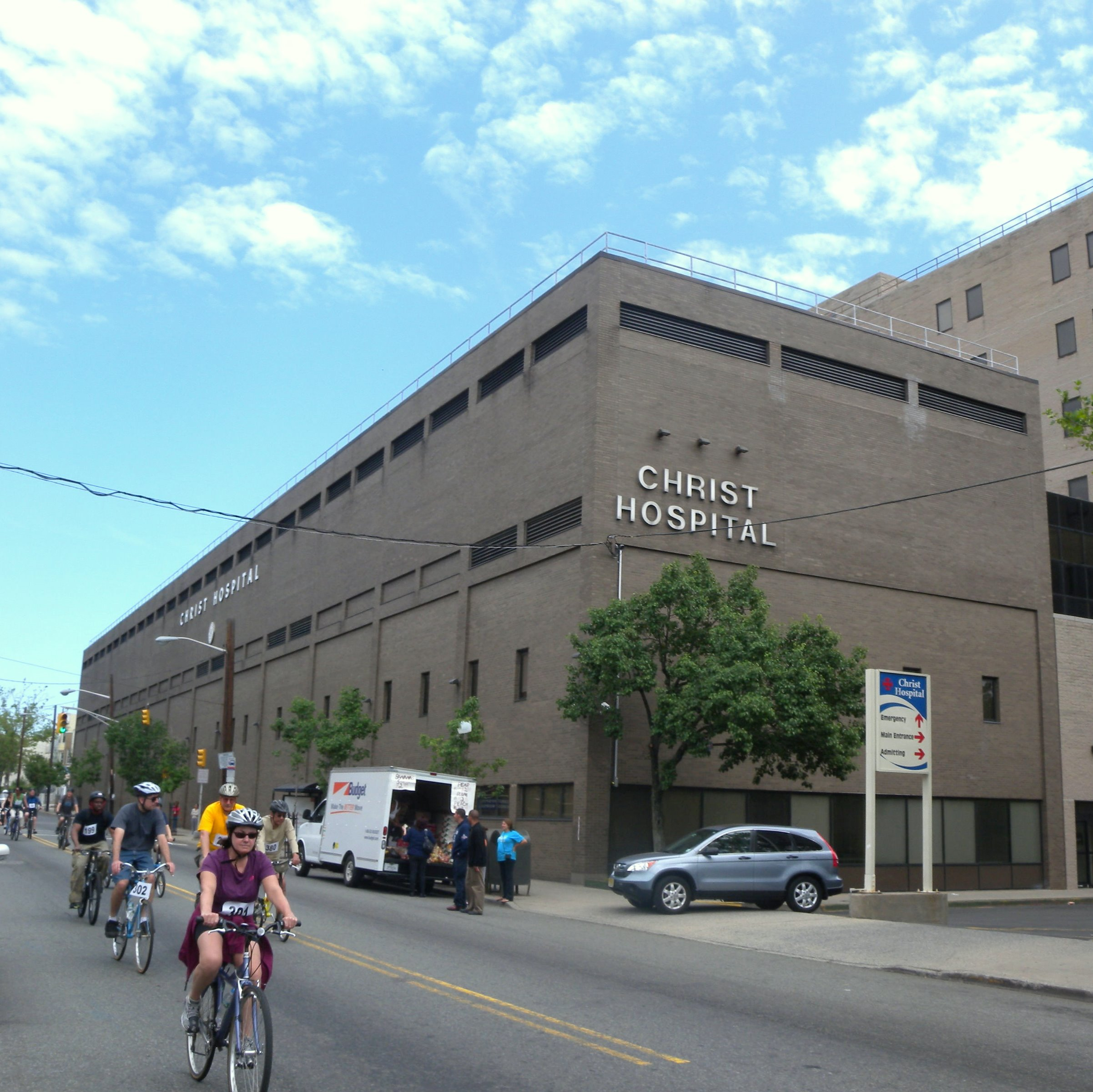

Geography
- Location: 176 Palisade Avenue; Jersey City, New Jersey, U.S.
- Coordinates: 40.73330°N 74.05115°W

Organisation
- Care system: Private
- Type: General regional

Services
- Beds: 376

History
- Founded: 1872
- Closed: 2026

Links
- Website: www.carepointhealth.org

Heights University Hospital, formerly Christ Hospital, was a hospital in Jersey City, New Jersey. It was affiliated with Hoboken University Medical Center and the Bayonne Medical Center. It was one of the six hospitals in Hudson County, New Jersey operated by the for-profit organization Hudson Hospital Opco, known as Care Point Health. In May 2025, following the bankruptcy of CarePoint, the hospital became part of Hudson Regional Health. When HRH was not able to get sufficient funds for further operation, the hospital was closed down in March 2026, after 154 years.

== History ==
Christ Hospital was founded in 1872 in Jersey City, New Jersey and was originally associated with the Episcopal Diocese of Newark.

The Christ Hospital School of Nursing was established in 1890 and since 1999 has run a cooperative program with Hudson County Community College. In 2014 it merged with the Bayonne Medical Center nursing school.

In 2011 it was announced that the hospital would be sold to Prime Healthcare Services. The proposed sale was the focus of significant community concern, generated competing offers, and Prime Healthcare's original offer was withdrawn on February 1, 2012. The hospital filed for bankruptcy proceedings in 2012, and was eventually awarded to what was deemed the highest bidder for $43.5 million.

According to a study conducted by National Nurses United and released in January 2014, the hospital was the 9th most expensive in the state, charging 763% above costs.

In November 2024, CarePoint Health filed for Chapter 11 bankruptcy protection, blaming high rising costs and lack of state funding from New Jersey. The company listed assets between $500,001 to $1 million, and liabilities of no more than $50,000. CarePoint plans to keep its hospitals operating as it invests $67 million in financing.

In 2025, the hospital was renamed Heights University Hospital.

In October 2025, Hudson Regional Health, CarePoint's successor, announced that the hospital would have to be closed unless sufficient state funding could be secured. When this did not come to pass, the operator decided to close the facility by February 28, 2026, except for the emergency room, which closed by March 14, 2026.

== Deaths ==
- Adolph Lankering (1851–1937), mayor of Hoboken, New Jersey
