= Fenway (disambiguation) =

Fenway Park is the home of the Boston Red Sox.

Fenway may also refer to:

- Fenway–Kenmore, a neighborhood in Boston, Massachusetts, containing:
  - Fenway (parkway), in the Emerald Necklace
  - Fenway station, light rail station on the Green Line
- Fenway Health, a network of health insurance providers in Massachusetts
- Fenway Park, a suburb of Chippenham, United Kingdom
- Fenway Recordings, a record label
- Fenway South, spring training facility of the Boston Red Sox
