= Fenway station =

Light rail station in Boston, Massachusetts, US

Fenway
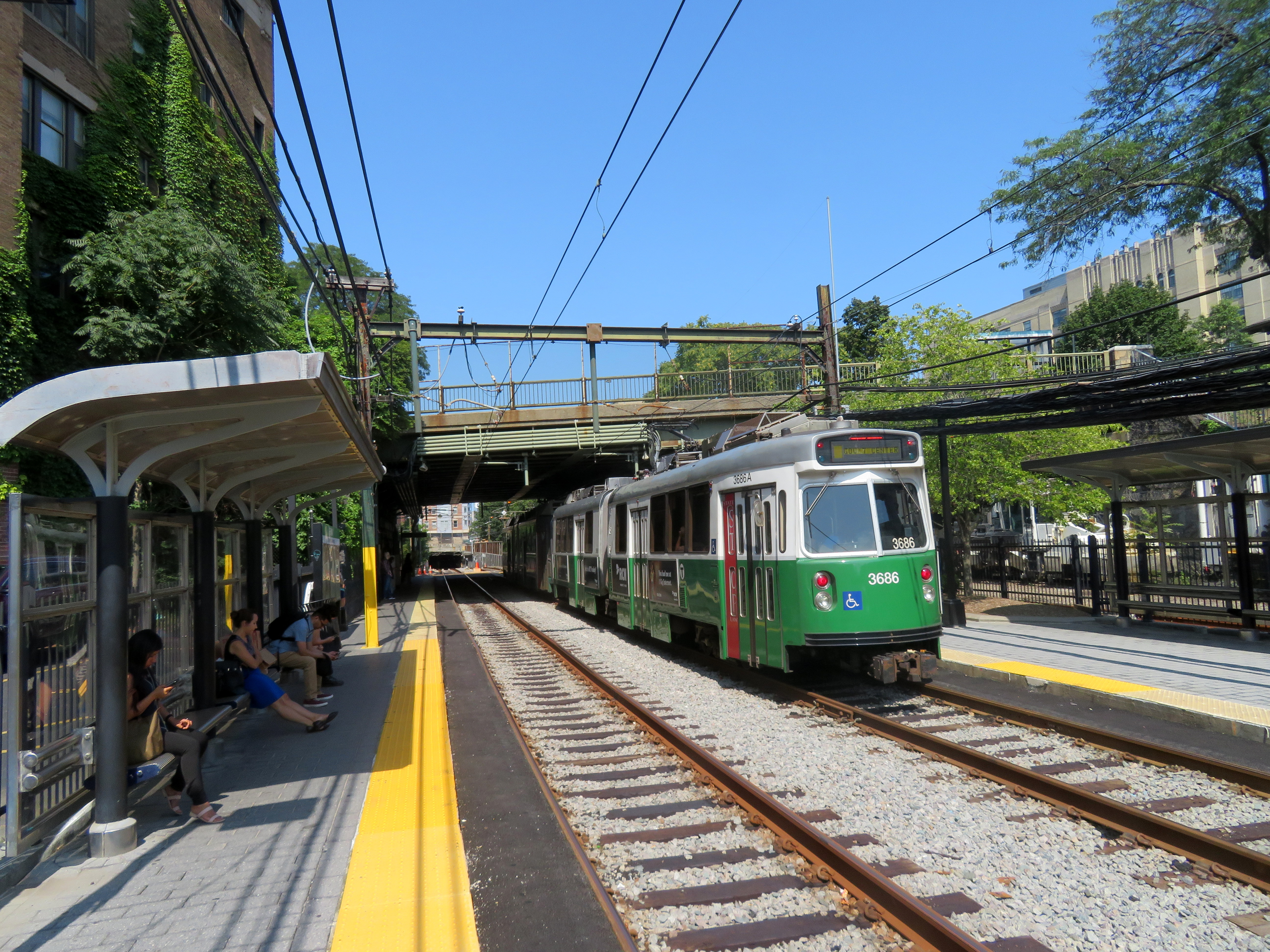
- An inbound train at Fenway station in 2019

General information
- Location: Park Drive near The Riverway; Boston, Massachusetts
- Coordinates: 42.34516°N 71.10466°W
- Line: Highland branch
- Platforms: 2 side platforms
- Tracks: 2
- Connections: MBTA bus: 47, 85

Construction
- Cycle facilities: 18 spaces
- Accessible: yes

History
- Opened: July 4, 1959
- Rebuilt: 1999
- Former names: Fenway Park

Passengers
- 2011: 3,488 daily boardings

Services
Preceding station	MBTA	Following station
Longwood toward Riverside	Green Line D branch	Kenmore toward Union Square
Location

Fenway station is a light rail stop on the MBTA Green Line D branch, located under Park Drive near the Riverway in the Fenway–Kenmore neighborhood of Boston, Massachusetts. It opened as Fenway Park along with the rest of the D branch on July 4, 1959, when streetcars replaced Highland branch commuter rail service. The station is fully accessible from Park Drive via the Landmark Center parking lot, as well as from Miner Street. Now named after the Fenway neighborhood rather than Fenway Park, it is slightly further from the stadium than Kenmore, though still heavily used during events. Fenway is the busiest surface stop on the D branch, averaging 3,488 weekday boardings by a 2011 count.

== Station layout ==
The station is located under the Park Drive overpass, with platforms stretching under the bridge and slightly to the west. A set of stairs connects the inbound platform to the bridge. Accessible sidewalks connect the inbound platform to Park Drive via the Landmark Center parking lot and to Miner Street next to the tracks. The outbound platform has no entrances of its own and is accessed via pedestrian crossings from the inbound platform. MBTA bus routes 47 and 85 run on Park Drive, with stops on the bridge above the station.

== History ==
=== Railroad history ===
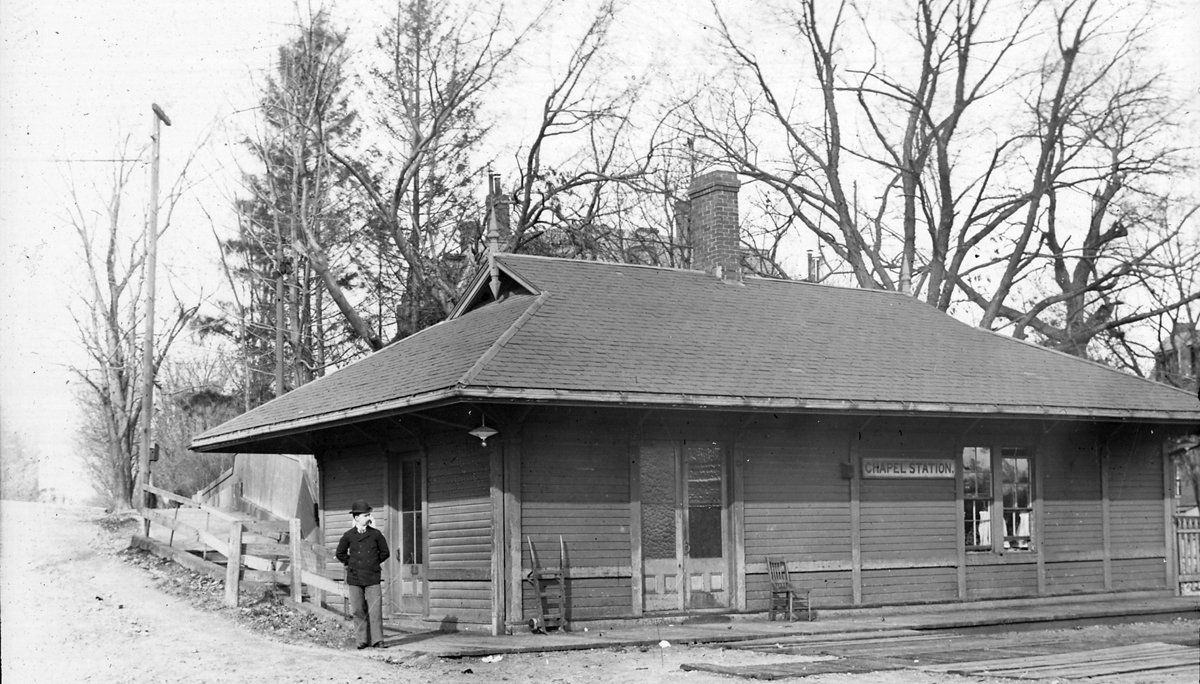
Chapel station was located 1,200 feet (370 m) to the southwest from the 1860s until 1893

The Boston and Worcester Railroad opened a 1.4-mile (2.3 km) branch from Brookline Junction to Brookline on April 10, 1848. The Charles River Branch Railroad extended the Brookline branch to Newton Upper Falls in November 1852 and to Needham in June 1853, keeping the original B&W station for its service.

The Boston and Albany Railroad bought back the line, then part of the New York and New England Railroad, in February 1883. It was double-tracked and extended to the B&A main at Riverside; "Newton Circuit" service via the Highland branch and the main line began on May 16, 1886. No station was located at what is now Park Drive; the nearest stations were Chapel and later Longwood to the west.

=== Light rail station ===
In June 1957, the Massachusetts Legislature approved the purchase of the branch by the M.T.A. from the nearly-bankrupt New York Central Railroad for conversion to a trolley line. Service ended on May 31, 1958. The line was quickly converted for trolley service and reopened on July 4, 1959. All pre-1958 station locations were kept (though many station buildings were demolished for parking lots) and a new Fenway Park station was added at Park Drive.

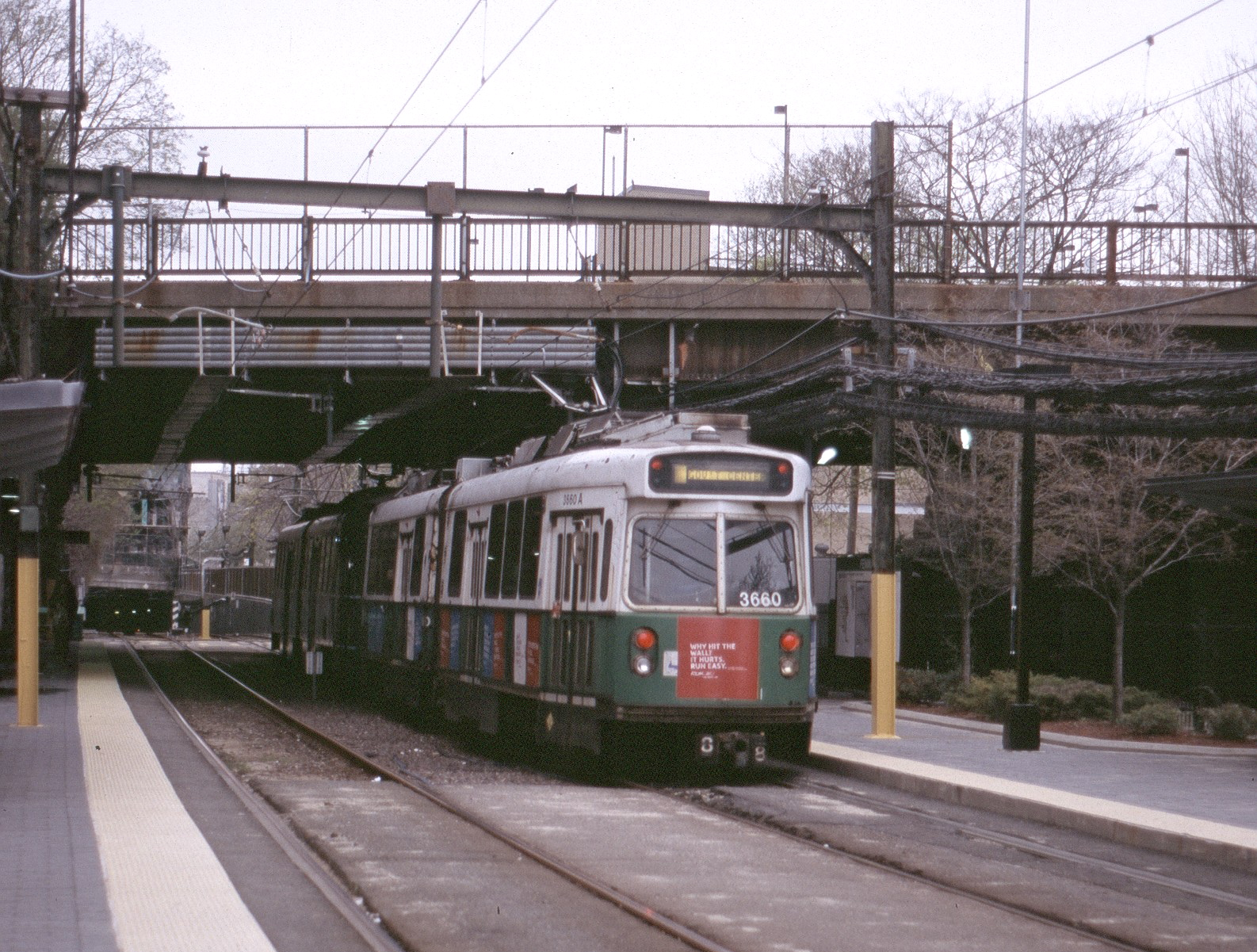
An inbound train at Fenway station in 2007

The name of the station was criticized from the start, as it is significantly further from Fenway Park than Kenmore station. In the mid-1970s, the MBTA began calling the station Fenway after the road of the same name; however, the old name was used on some maps into the 1980s. Until the 2006 season, it remained well-trafficked by fans from Red Sox games because the MBTA did not collect fares at outbound Green Line surface stops, making the trip to Riverside free for those boarding at Fenway but not at Kenmore. At the beginning of 2007, the MBTA started collecting fares on outbound trips and the station's popularity declined. Kenmore remains the primary Green Line station for Fenway Park, though Fenway is also used.

In the late 1990s and early 2000s, the MBTA modified key surface stops with raised platforms for accessibility as part of the Light Rail Accessibility Program. The renovation of Fenway was completed in 1999. Around 2006, the MBTA added a wooden mini-high platform on the inbound side, allowing level boarding on older Type 7 LRVs. These platforms were installed at eight Green Line stations in 2006–07 as part of the settlement of Joanne Daniels-Finegold, et al. v. MBTA.

Fenway was a proposed stop on the Urban Ring – a circumferential bus rapid transit (BRT) line designed to connect the existing radial MBTA rail lines to reduce overcrowding in the downtown stations. Under plans released in 2008, the line would have been in a tunnel under and slightly offset from the D branch, with an underground station between Miner Street and Park Drive. The project was cancelled in 2010

In 2016, the MBTA considered adding one or two elevators to improve accessibility at the station, but it was not pursued. There were no crosswalks to access the southbound bus stop at the station; the nearest crosswalks were at Riverway. A $170,000 state grant awarded in December 2020 funded the 2021 installation of an accessible crosswalk with flashing signals at the station.
