= Longwood station (MBTA) =

Light rail station in Brookline, Massachusetts, US

Longwood
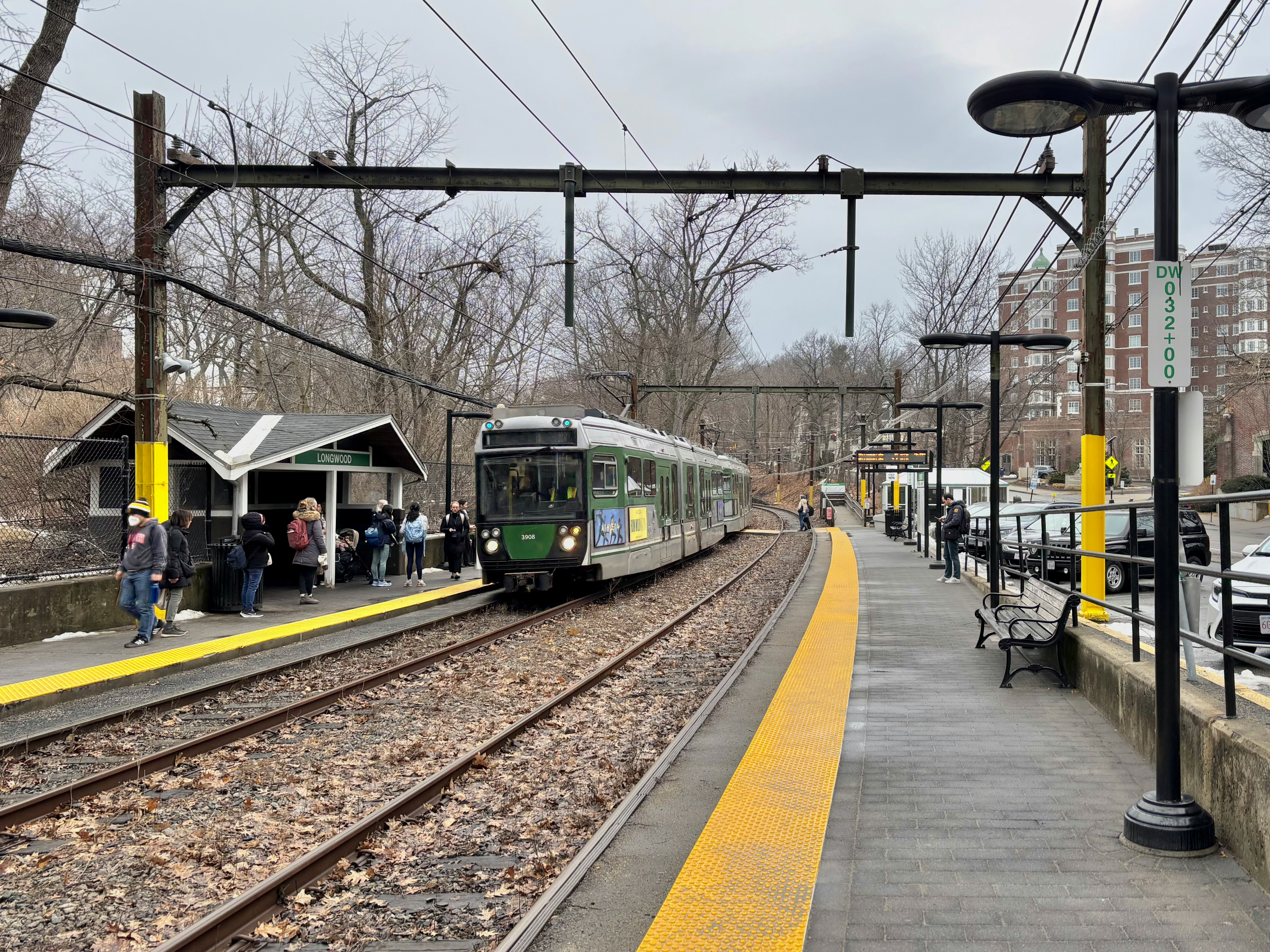
- An inbound train entering Longwood station in February 2025

General information
- Location: Chapel Street north of Longwood Avenue; Brookline, Massachusetts
- Coordinates: 42°20′30″N 71°06′36″W
- Line: Highland branch
- Platforms: 2 side platforms
- Tracks: 2

Construction
- Parking: 11 spaces
- Cycle facilities: 15 spaces
- Accessible: Yes

History
- Opened: July 4, 1959
- Rebuilt: 2007–2009

Passengers
- 2011: 2,719 daily boardings

Services
Preceding station	MBTA	Following station
Brookline Village toward Riverside	Green Line D branch	Fenway toward Union Square
Former services
Preceding station	New York Central Railroad	Following station
Brookline toward Riverside	Highland branch	Trinity Place / Huntington Avenue toward Boston
Location

Longwood station is a light rail station on the MBTA Green Line D branch, located on Chapel Street in Brookline, Massachusetts, on the border with Boston, just north of Longwood Avenue. It serves the Longwood Medical Area, the Colleges of the Fenway, and residential areas of Brookline. The station opened with the rest of the line on July 4, 1959. After renovation work completed in 2009, Longwood station is accessible from both Chapel Street and Riverway Park.

== History ==
=== Original stations ===
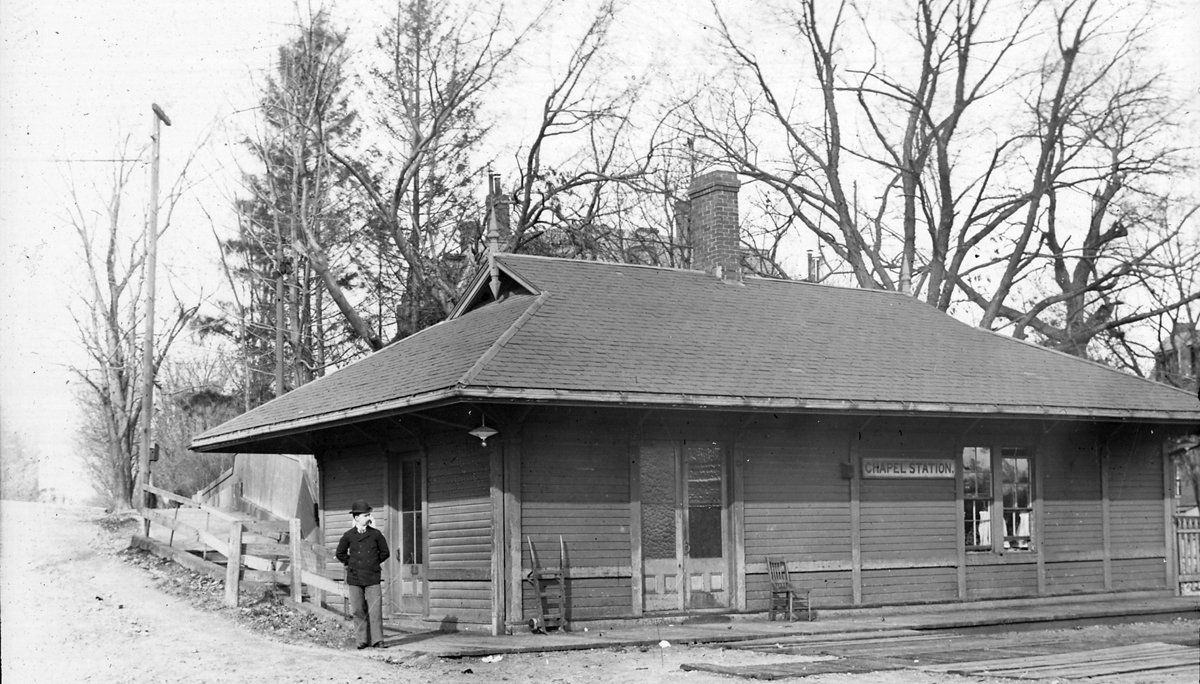
Chapel station at an unknown date

The Boston and Worcester Railroad opened a 1.4-mile (2.3 km) branch from Brookline Junction to Brookline on April 10, 1848. There was one intermediate station on the branch – Longwood just south of Longwood Avenue. The Charles River Branch Railroad extended the Brookline branch to Newton Upper Falls in November 1852 and to Needham in June 1853, keeping the original B&W station for its service.

The Sears Chapel was built in 1861 and the Church of Our Savior in 1868; sometime that decade Chapel station was opened as a flag stop located at Carlton Street. The Boston and Albany Railroad bought back the line, then part of the New York and New England Railroad, in February 1883. It was double-tracked and extended to the B&A main at Riverside; "Newton Circuit" service via the Highland branch and the main line began on May 16, 1886.

=== Station consolidation ===
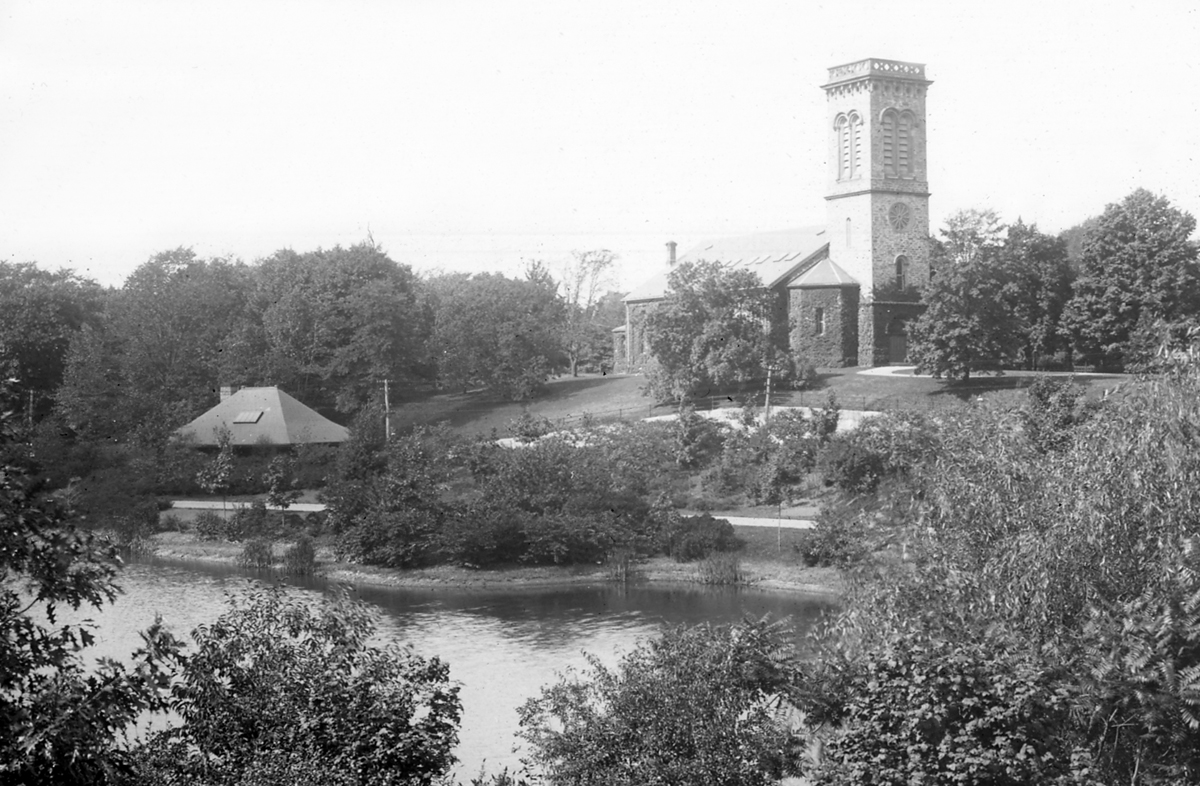
Sears Chapel and the 1893-built Longwood station shortly after its construction

As part of a general improvement program, the railroad replaced many of its original wooden stations with new stone buildings designed by H.H. Richardson and Shepley, Rutan and Coolidge and landscaped by Frederick Law Olmsted. All stations on the Highland branch save for Longwood, Chapel, and Brookline were thus rebuilt between 1883 and 1894.

In April 1892, the B&A petitioned the Massachusetts Board of Railroad Commissioners to allow them to combine the two old stations into a single new station between their location. The railroad cited the closeness of the two stations, their poor locations, and traffic losses due to the electrified trolley line opened on nearby Beacon Street in 1889. The board referenced the railroad's arguments, the assent of the Brookline selectmen, and an overwhelming majority of residents and passengers in favor of the consolidation when giving their assent.

In early 1893, the B&A commissioned Shepley, Rutan and Coolidge to build new stations at Longwood and Riverside. The new Longwood station was a "very simple rectangular design" with a dominant stone roof that provided shelter on all four sides. Located on Chapel Street near Hawes Street between the former station locations, it was constructed from July 1893 to May 1894.

A footbridge at Carlton Street was added by the town in mid-1894 to provide access to the Riverway Park. One of the only steel bridges in an Olmsted-designed park, it was designed and built by Alexis French, Brookline's first town engineer. The bridge was closed around 1975 due to severe corrosion. Plans to repair and reopen the footbridge proved locally controversial for several decades. The bridge deck was removed in July 2021 for restoration and returned in October 2022. The footbridge reopened in August 2023.

=== Conversion to light rail service ===
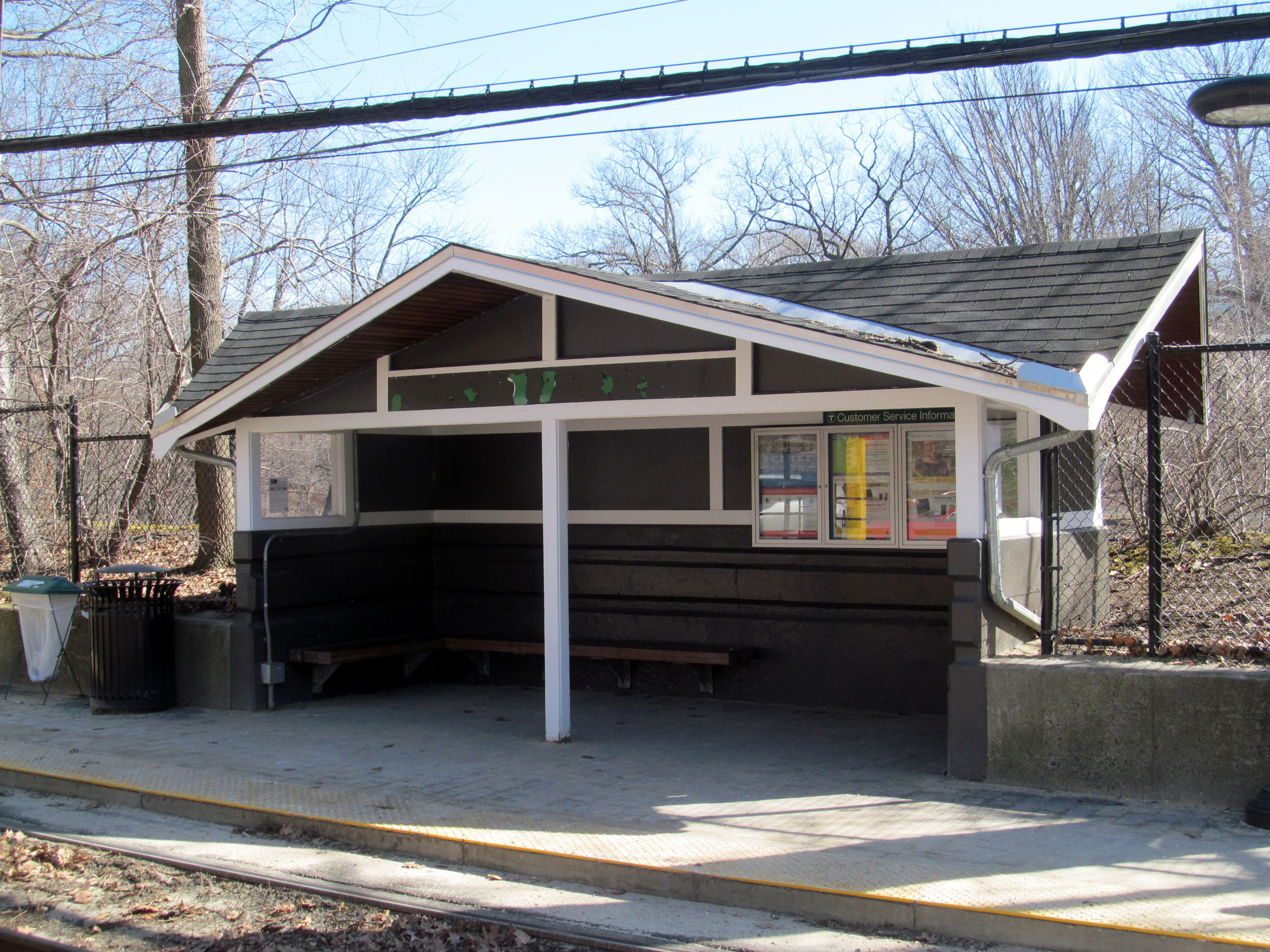
This wooden shelter replaced the stone station building in 1959

The station agent was removed in May 1949, but the station building remained in use as shelter for passengers. In June 1957, the Massachusetts Legislature approved the purchase of the branch by the M.T.A. from the nearly-bankrupt New York Central Railroad for conversion to a trolley line. Service ended on May 31, 1958. The line was quickly converted for trolley service, and the line including Longwood station reopened on July 4, 1959. The 1893-built station was torn down during the conversion to make room for a small parking lot. The station has two side platforms serving the line's two tracks.

=== Renovations ===
During the Brookline Village/Longwood Avenue Station Renovation Project, the MBTA reconstructed Longwood and Brookline Village stations for accessibility. The two stations received raised platforms to interface with low-floor LRVs, wooden ramps to access older high-floor LRVs, and other upgrades. The MBTA originally planned to have the Chapel Street entrance be the only accessible entrance to Longwood station but after it became apparent this was not sufficient, ramps were added from Riverway Park as well. Work on both stations began on July 23, 2007, and construction was completed in the second quarter of 2009.
