= Francis Street–Fenwood Road Historic District =

Historic district in Massachusetts, United States

- U.S. National Register of Historic Places
- U.S. Historic district
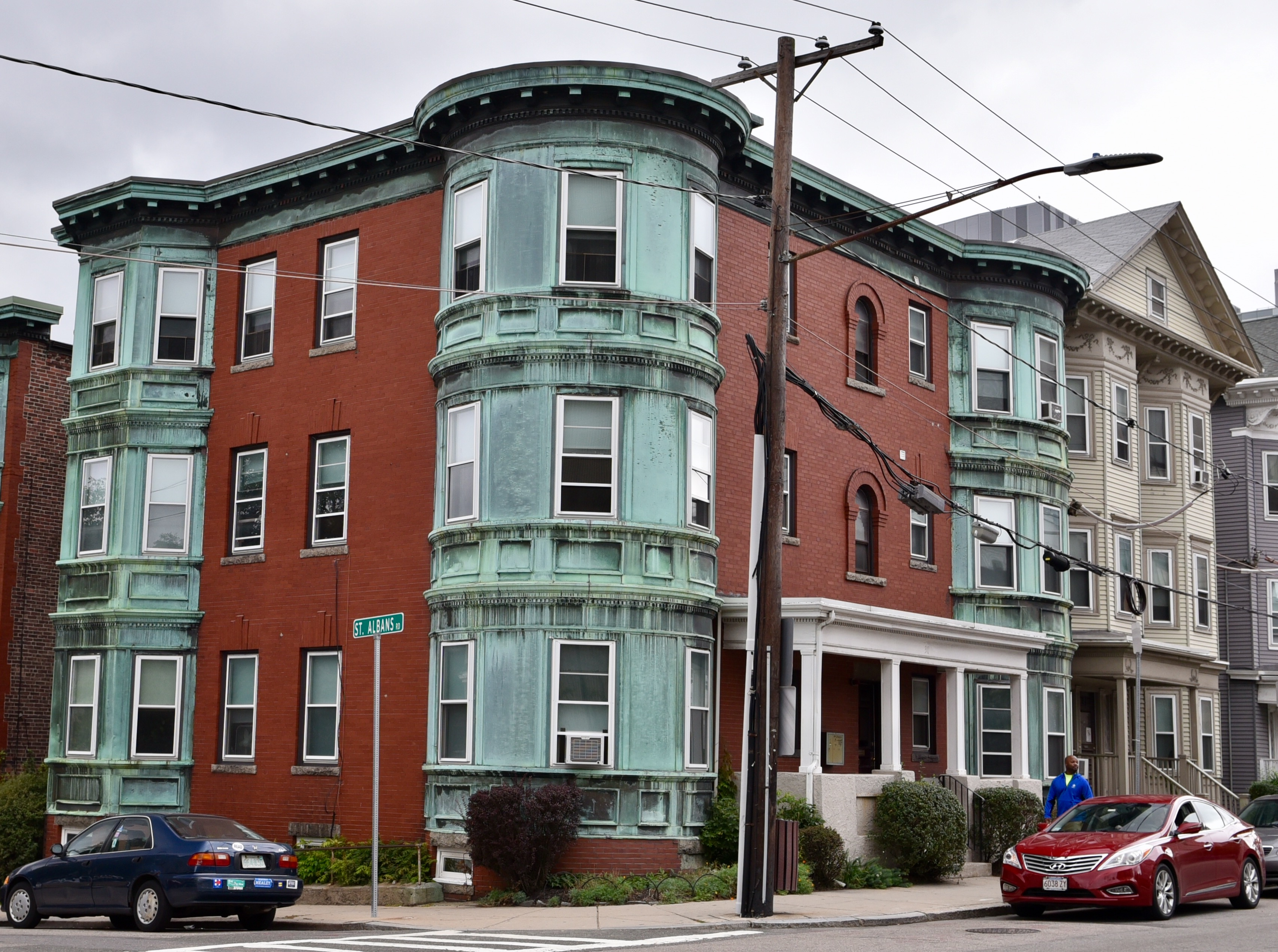

- Location within Massachusetts Location within the United States
- Location: Francis Street, Fenwood Road, St. Albans Road, Longwood, Boston, Massachusetts
- Coordinates: 42°20′5″N 71°6′23″W
- Area: 7 acres (2.8 ha)
- Built: 1898
- Architect: Wheelwright & Haven; and others
- Architectural style: Queen Anne, Colonial Revival, Classical Revival
- NRHP reference No.: 16000409
- Added to NRHP: June 23, 2016

The Francis Street–Fenwood Road Historic District encompasses a small but cohesive early 20th-century residential area and streetcar suburb in the Longwood area of Boston, Massachusetts. Bounded by Huntington Avenue, Francis Street, Vining Avenue, Fenwood Road, and St. Albans Road, it includes a collection of two and three-family houses, as well as two apartment houses, a school, and one commercial building, all of which predate the large medical complexes that dominate the Longwood area. The district was listed on the National Register of Historic Places in 2016.

== Description and history ==
The Longwood area was opened for development in the late 19th century by the extension of Huntington Avenue to the area in 1882, the filling and grading of the marshes lining the Muddy River, and by the extension of the streetcar line (now the MBTA Green Line E branch) in 1889. Huntington Avenue was lined by suburban estates, but the area west of Francis Street was undeveloped until 1897. Within ten years, it had been almost completely built out.

The buildings lining Huntington Avenue are the largest of the district. They include two Classical Revival three-story brick apartment houses at 777-779 Huntington, built in 1916, the L-shaped Classical Revival Farragut School building (1903), and the mixed commercial-residential block between Fenwood and Francis Streets. Between Huntington and Vining Avenue, Francis and Fenwood are lined by two and three-family houses, mostly in a combination of Queen Anne and Colonial Revival styles. Scale, massing, and setback are consistent, and many exterior features have either been preserved or restored. Most of these are of wood frame construction; only a few are built of brick.

== See also ==
- National Register of Historic Places listings in southern Boston, Massachusetts
