= Landmark Center (Boston) =

- Sears Roebuck and Company Mail Order Store
- U.S. National Register of Historic Places
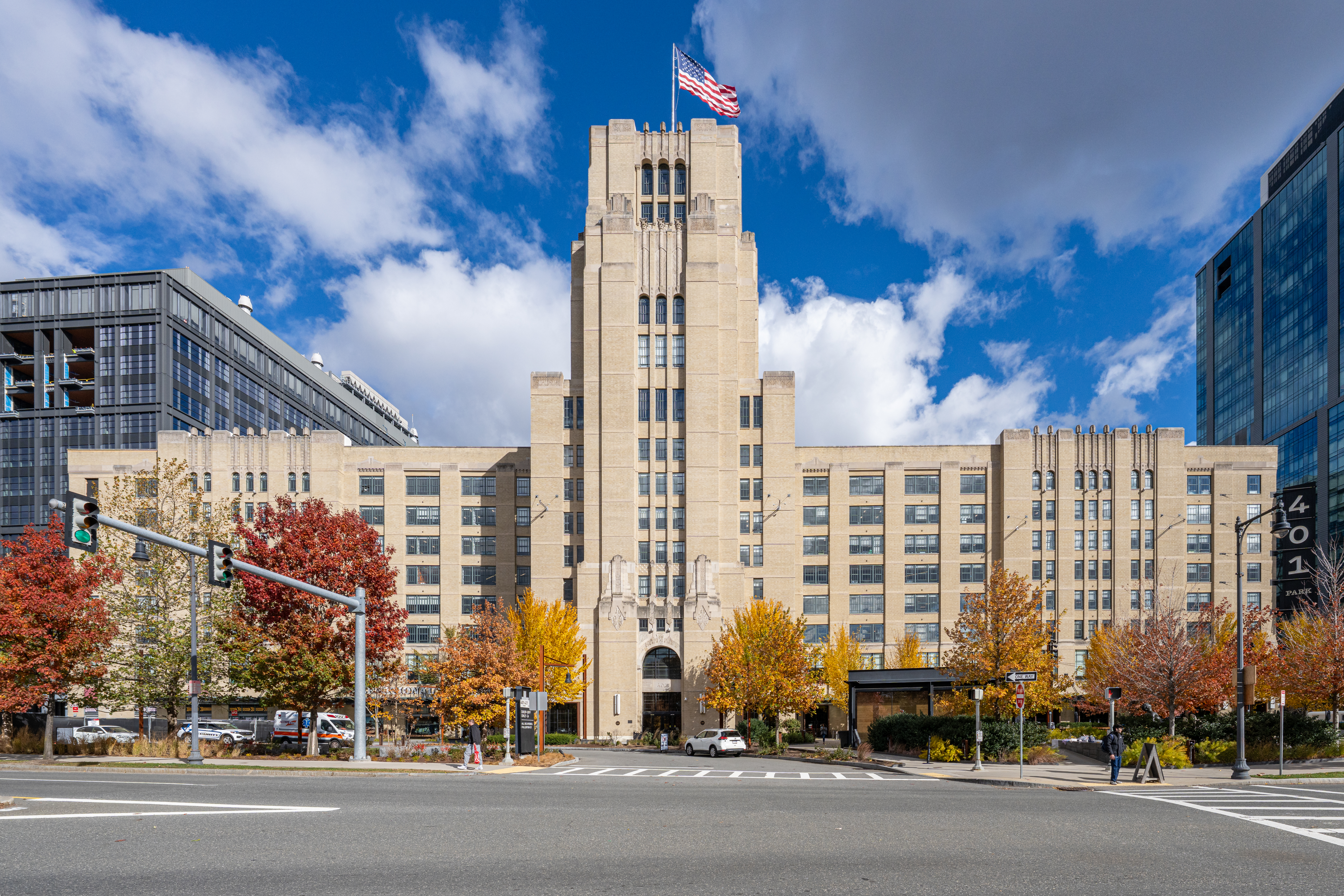
- (2025)

- Location within Boston Location within Massachusetts Location within the United States
- Location: Boston, Massachusetts
- Coordinates: 42°20′41″N 71°6′10″W
- Built: 1928
- Architect: Nimmons, Carr & Wright; Et al.
- Architectural style: Art Deco
- NRHP reference No.: 90001992
- Added to NRHP: January 15, 1991

The Landmark Center or 401 Park Building in Boston, Massachusetts, is a commercial center situated in a limestone and brick art deco building built in 1928 for Sears, Roebuck and Company. It features a 200-foot-tall (61 m) tower and, as Sears Roebuck and Company Mail Order Store, it is listed on the National Register of Historic Places and designated as a Boston Landmark in 1989.

The building is located at the intersection of Park Drive and Brookline Avenue; also the meeting point of the Riverway and the Back Bay Fens, two links of the Emerald Necklace park system designed in the 19th century by Frederick Law Olmsted. It is one of the tallest buildings in its vicinity, and viewers on top of the tower can see the Charles River, Cambridge, and the Great Blue Hill in Milton.

== History ==
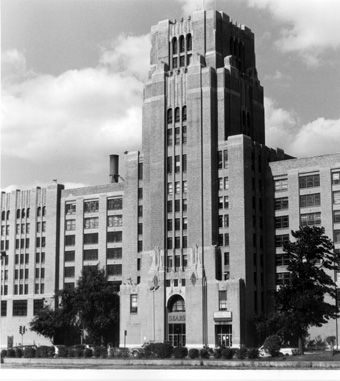
Sears Roebuck and Company Mail Order Store

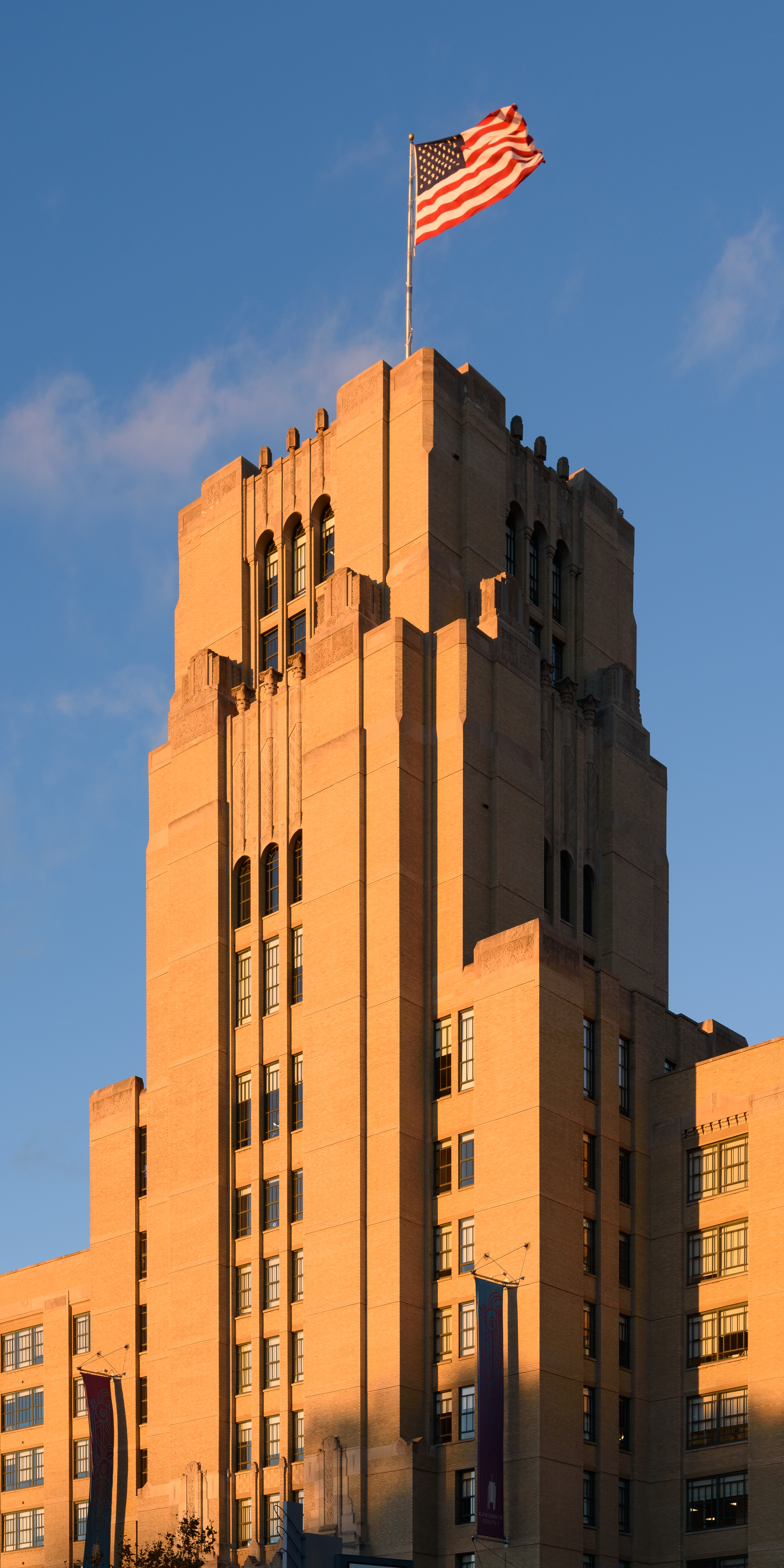
Close-up of tower

=== Development and vacancy ===
The Landmark Center building was the last of a series of Sears distribution centers designed by George C. Nimmons, and was completed in 1928. For nearly sixty years it served as a warehouse and distribution center for Sears, Roebuck and Company and offered local bargain-hunters an opportunity to obtain merchandise at below-catalog prices.

Sears closed the distribution center in January, 1988, and the building became vacant. Various developers investigated new uses for the property and it came close to being demolished several times.

=== Midtown Exchange ===
The Landmark Center has a sister building, which was also originally designed for Sears, in Minneapolis, Minnesota, listed on the National Register of Historic Places as the Sears, Roebuck and Company Mail-Order Warehouse and Retail Store. In 2005, it was converted into the Midtown Exchange, including an international bazaar and food court known as the Midtown Global Market. Like the Landmark Center, the Midtown Exchange has a large medical group as a cornerstone in the building.

=== Restoration of Sears building ===
After purchasing the former Sears property, The Abbey Group (a Boston-based real estate concern) contracted the architectural firm of Bruner/Cott & Associates to convert it into a profitable rental space. Bruner/Cott took special consideration for the original character of the building while adding distinctive features including a seven-story tall interior space lit by oversized skylights that deliver natural light to interior office spaces. The conversion was recognized with awards including:

- 2001 Preservation Achievement Award, Boston Preservation Alliance
- 2001 Reconstruction Award, Building Design & Construction
- 2002 Preservation Award, Massachusetts Historical Commission

Derelict for a time before being reopened in fall 2000, the building now houses retail stores (including REI and Staples), a 13-screen movie theater, a 1,700-space parking garage, a sports complex and a day care center; as well as office space largely occupied by tenants related to the medical field and the nearby Longwood Medical and Academic Area: the anchor, Blue Cross and Blue Shield of Massachusetts occupied the majority until its departure in 2015, while most of the additional offices are rented by Harvard Medical School and the Harvard School of Public Health. Boston Children's Hospital has administrative offices as well, in addition to Harvard Pilgrim Health Care.

A food hall, Time Out Market, opened in 2019 on the ground floor of the building. Also in 2019, Trillium Brewing Company opened a taproom in a new greenhouse-like structure with outdoor seating area, on the grounds of 401 Park.

On January 5, 2021, Alexandria Real Estate Equities, Inc. disclosed that it was purchasing the Landmark Center for $1.52 billion (~$1.73 billion in 2024) to continue developing the property as a life science hub.

== See also ==
- Midtown Exchange, Minneapolis, Minnesota
- Sears, Roebuck & Company Mail Order Building, Los Angeles, California
- National Register of Historic Places listings in southern Boston, Massachusetts
