= Trillium Brewing Company =

Brewery in Massachusetts

- Industry: Alcoholic beverage
- Founded: 2013
- Founder: JC and Esther Tetreault
- Headquarters: Boston, Mass, United States
- Products: Beer
- Owner: JC and Esther Tetreault
- Number of employees: 286 Full and Part-time (2018)
- Website: www.trilliumbrewing.com

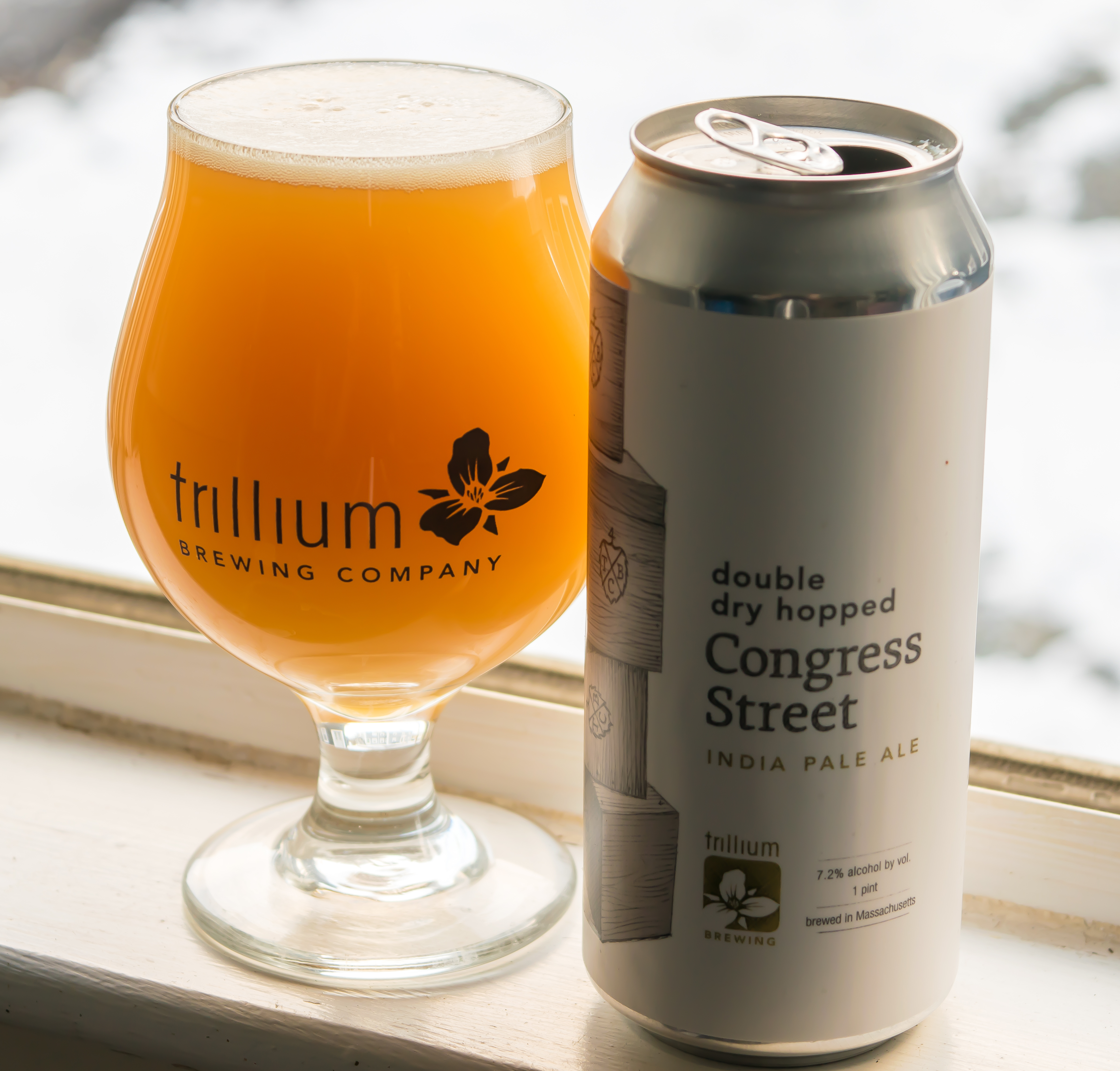
Trillium's Double Dry Hopped Congress Street IPA

Trillium Brewing Company is a brewery that currently operates six facilities throughout Massachusetts and Connecticut, United States. These locations include a production brewery in Canton, MA, a restaurant/taproom/beer garden in Canton, MA, a full-service restaurant and pilot brewery in the Fort Point neighborhood of Boston, a taproom/beer garden in Boston's Fenway neighborhood, an open-air seasonal beer garden in downtown Boston, and a farm focused on regenerative, holistic agriculture in North Stonington, CT.

== History ==
After two years of planning, buildout, pilot brewing, and securing licenses and permits, founders JC and Esther Tetreault established the brewery on March 21, 2013, at its first facility in Fort Point, Boston, Massachusetts. Despite its urban setting, the Tetreault's have envisioned Trillium as a New England farmhouse-inspired brewery rooted in community and hospitality from its inception. With brewing and to-go retail operations under the same, 2,500 square-foot on Congress Street, the brewery quickly outgrew its original home.

In December 2015, Trillium opened a second facility in at 110 Shawmut Road in Canton, Massachusetts. The 16,000 square-foot space allowed for the brewery to install a 30bbl brewhouse, increase production dramatically, and pour their beers direct-to-guest for the first time in the young company's history.

In the summer of 2017, Trillium opened up their seasonally-operating Beer Garden on The Greenway. This space is located alongside Atlantic Avenue on the Rose Kennedy Greenway in partnership with the Rose Fitzgerald Kennedy Greenway Conservancy, and offers draft pours and rotating food truck vendors.

In October 2018, Trillium opened a 3-story restaurant and brewery in Fort Point, complete with patio, roof deck, and a full farm-to-table style menu.

In October 2019, Trillium opened the doors to their Fenway taproom and beer garden located at 401 Park Drive, only a short walk from Fenway Park.

In July 2021, Trillium relocated their Canton taproom location from 110 Shawmut Rd to their expansive new home at 100 Royall St, overlooking the Blue Hills Reservation, and allowing for a higher volume and more immersive customer experience. 110 Shawmut Rd location continues to operate as a brewery production facility.

== Awards ==
Trillium quickly made their way to the RateBeer "Best Brewers in the World" Top 100 chart, beginning in 2014. From 2016 to 2019 RateBeer has consistently listed Trillium as the 3rd best brewery in the world, named them the best brewery in Massachusetts in 2019, and the 4th best in the world in 2020. In 2016, RateBeer also included six Trillium beers in their top 15 beers in the India Pale Ale (IPA) category, one beer in the Double IPA category, six beers in the American Amber/Pale category and one beer in the Wheat category. Trillium has continued to claim numerous other beer category awards annually ever since.

== Controversies ==
In 2014, Trillium failed to renew their state brewers license, resulting in a nearly month-long closure. Trillium claimed to have submitted an application for renewal in 2013, however no license was issued and the state sent numerous notices to the company without response. Trillium continued to operate illegally for a brief period of time before being closed by the state at the end of November 2014.

In late 2018, a number of former Trillium employees posted messages on BeerAdvocate.com accusing the ownership of cutting wages, serving sub par product to customers, paying retail staff server wages and illegally using tequila in a beer and instructing staff to lie about it. Trillium owner JC Tetreault spoke to the Boston Globe admitting to making "a mistake" and did not deny any of the claims, confirming many of them.

On November 26, 2018, the owners of Trillium posted a statement on their website saying retail employees will have their hourly wages restored for longtime workers whose pay had been cut. The company also apologized to employees, customers, and friends. The Boston Globe reported the company's retail workforce will be paid $15 to $18 an hour, and still have the ability to earn tips from customers purchasing beer.

In July 2020, cans from a batch of Trillium's Daily Serving—a line of fruited Berliner Weisse beers—began to explode in customers' homes. This isolated incident was caused by trace amounts of active yeast continuing fermentation in the cans when stored in warm temperatures, therefore, resulting in excess buildup of CO_{2}. Trillium’s initial response was to deny refunds and pointed blame for the exploding cans toward improper storage by the customers. After a damning article in Paste Magazine, Trillium issued a warning announcement and began to offer refunds. Paste Magazine’s article was later revised after receiving official statement from the brewery.
