= Brookline Village station =

Light rail station in Brookline, Massachusetts, US

Brookline Village
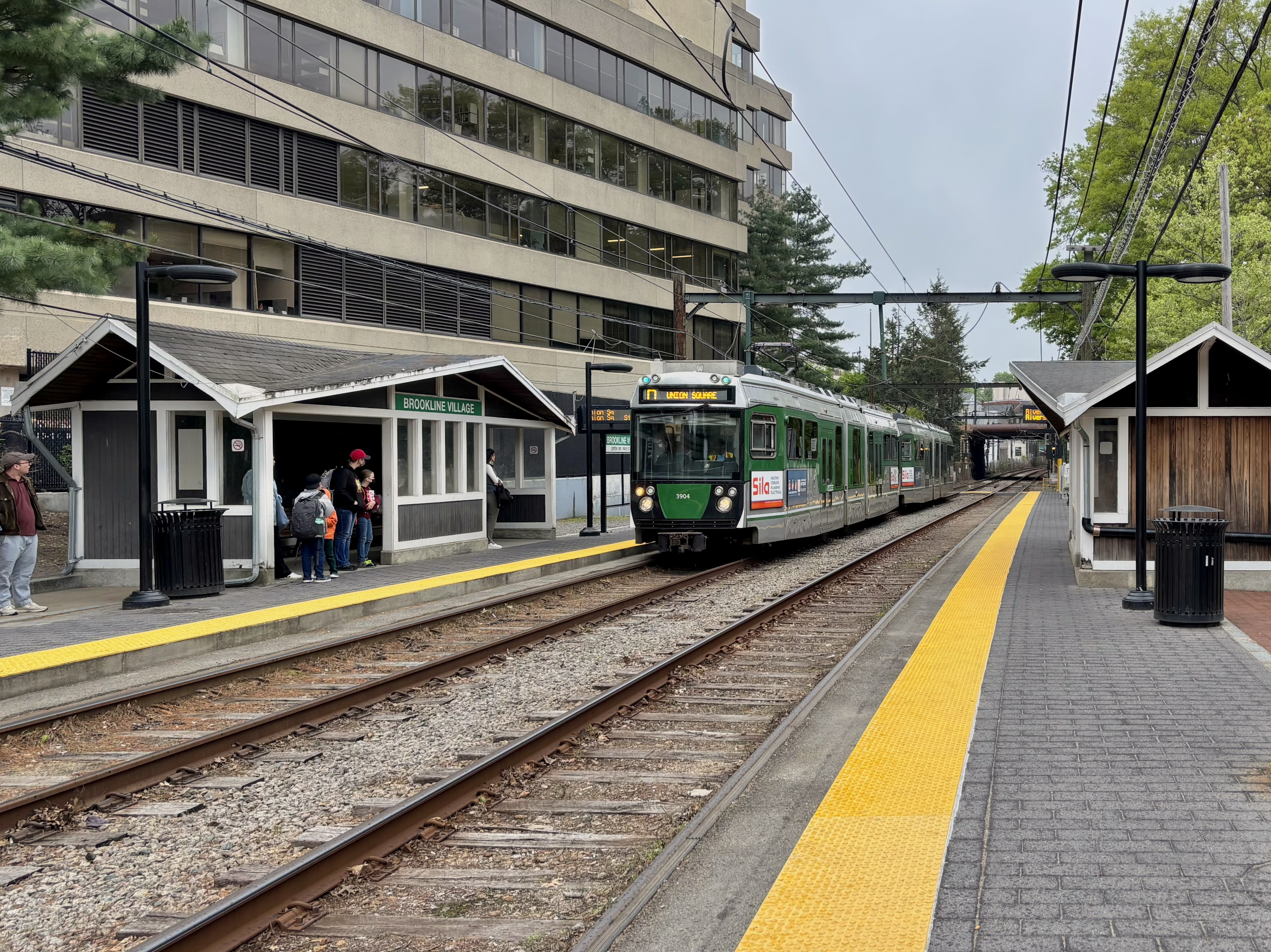
- An inbound train at Brookline Village station in 2025

General information
- Location: Station Street east of Washington Street; Brookline, Massachusetts
- Coordinates: 42.33255°N 71.11699°W
- Line: Highland Branch
- Platforms: 2 side platforms
- Tracks: 2
- Connections: MBTA bus: 60, 65, 66

Construction
- Cycle facilities: 15 spaces
- Accessible: Yes

History
- Opened: July 4, 1959
- Rebuilt: 2007–2009
- Former names: Brookline (1848–1958)

Passengers
- 2013: 3,230 daily boardings

Services
Preceding station	MBTA	Following station
Brookline Hills toward Riverside	Green Line D branch	Longwood toward Union Square
Former services
Preceding station	New York Central Railroad	Following station
Brookline Hills toward Riverside	Highland branch	Longwood toward Boston
Location

Brookline Village station is a light rail station on the MBTA Green Line D branch, located in the Brookline Village neighborhood of Brookline, Massachusetts, United States. It was originally a commuter rail station on the Boston and Albany Railroad's Highland branch; it closed with the rest of the line in 1958 and reopened on July 4, 1959, as a light rail station. With 3,230 daily boardings, it is the third-busiest surface station on the D branch and the sixth-busiest surface station overall. It is also the closest surface transfer between the D and E branches of the Green Line; Riverway station is about 1,500 feet (500 m) to the east. Brookline Village station has raised platforms for accessibility with low-floor light rail vehicles.

== History ==
=== Commuter rail ===
The Boston and Worcester Railroad opened its Brookline branch from Brookline Junction to Brookline Village on April 10, 1848. The branch was extended west to Newton Upper Falls by the Charles River Branch Railroad in November 1852. The original wooden station at Brookline was replaced by a Victorian-style red brick station in 1878. The Boston and Albany Railroad (B&A), the successor to the Boston and Worcester, purchased the 1852-built extension in 1883 and extended it to its mainline at Riverside. The B&A began its Newton Circuit service over the Highland branch on May 16, 1886. All of the Highland branch stations except Brookline were replaced by stone structure designed by H.H. Richardson and Shepley, Rutan and Coolidge in the 1880s and 1890s.

=== Streetcar transfer station ===
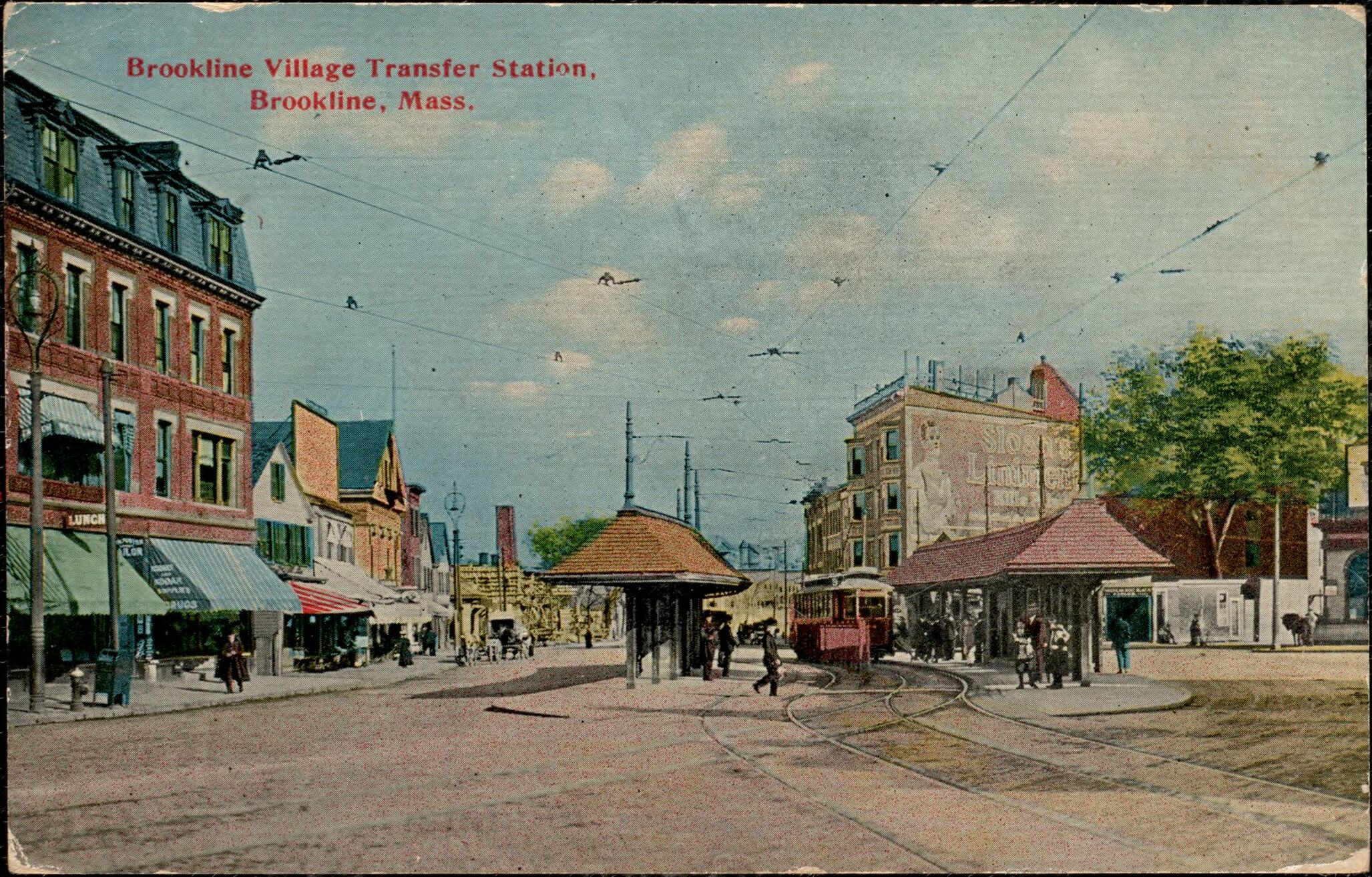
The transfer station on a 1913 postcard

The first horsecar line to reach Brookline Village was a branch of the Tremont Street line, which opened on October 26, 1859, from Roxbury Crossing to slightly northwest of Brookline Village along Washington Street. A branch from Brookline Village to Cypress Street on Pill Hill opened around 1888. Both lines were electrified on August 4, 1894. The Washington Street branch was extended to Washington Square on September 1; this allowed through service from Reservoir, and – after August 1896 – Boston College. Two additional lines were added in July 1900: a branch on Harvard Street to Coolidge Corner (with through service to Oak Square, and the Ipswich Street line on Brookline Avenue. The Ipswich Street line was extended to Chestnut Hill in late 1900, and the Boston and Worcester Street Railway (B&W) began running on the Chestnut Hill tracks in May 1903.

Even before the completion of the lines in 1900, the Boston Elevated Railway (BERy) noted the need for improved transfer facilities in Brookline Village. Residents and local politicians petitioned for improved facilities in 1904 and 1908. A transfer station in the middle of the square was finally built in 1912 during road widening. It had two side platforms, with shelters similar to those at Coolidge Corner. By 1926, the transfer station served five main streetcar routes: Chestnut Hill–Park Street via Huntington Avenue, Cypress Street–Massachusetts via Ipswich Street, Lake Street–Brookline Village via Washington Street, Allston–Dudley, and the B&W.

The Washington Street line was converted to bus in 1926. As construction of the Worcester Turnpike progressed eastward, the B&W was replaced by buses in June 1932, followed by the Chestnut Hill branch that November. The Ipswich Street line was cut back and mostly replaced by buses to Kenmore in mid-1933. Cypress Street service (operated via Huntington after 1932) was cut back to Brookline Village on June 10, 1934. The Allston–Dudley route was replaced by buses on September 10, 1938, with the Huntington Avenue cars cut back to Brigham Circle short turns. The city immediately demolished the transfer station to speed traffic flow through the square.

=== Conversion to light rail service ===
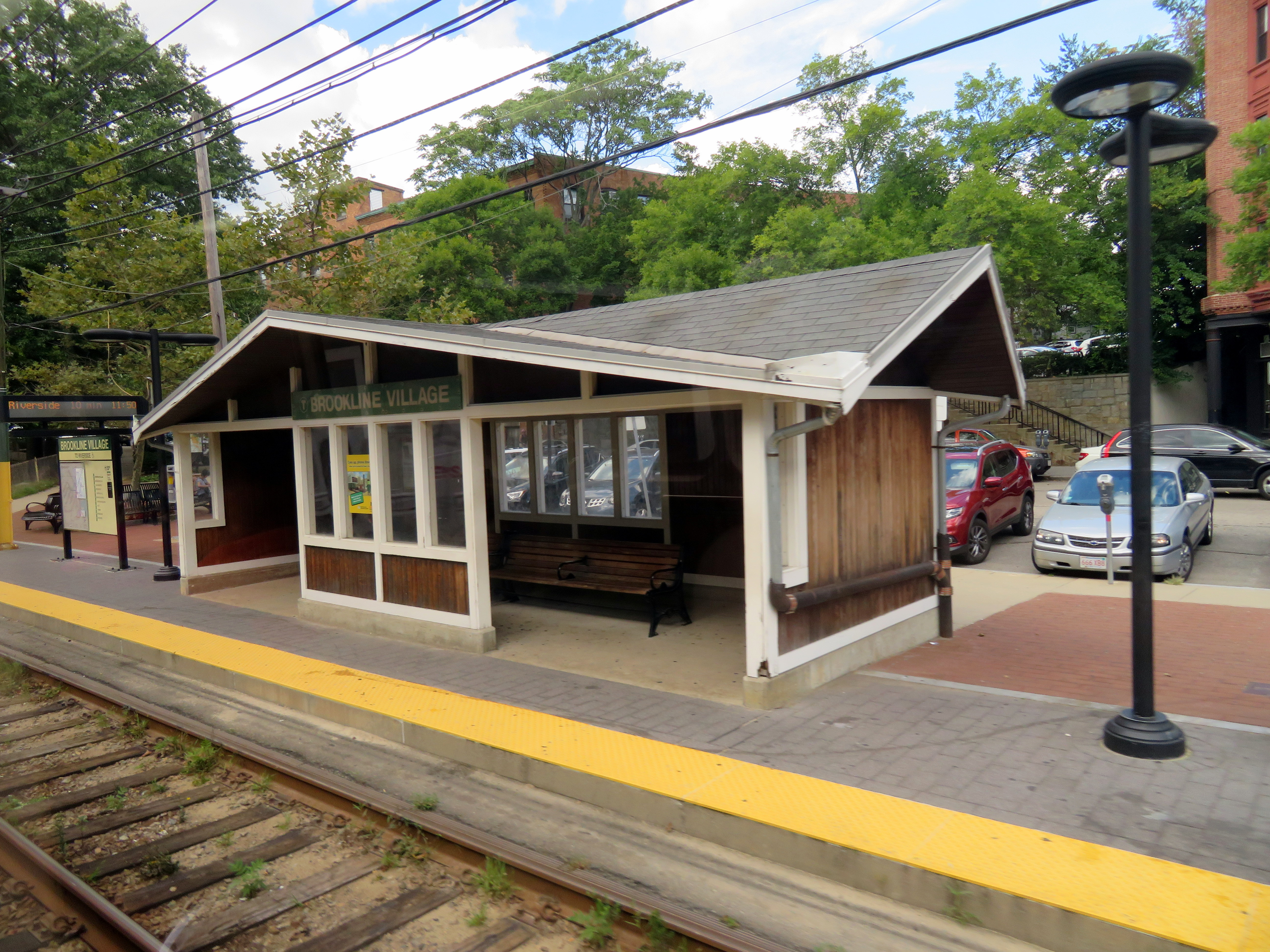
Wooden shelters replaced the former station building in 1959.

In June 1957, the Massachusetts Legislature approved the purchase of the Highland branch by the M.T.A. from the nearly-bankrupt New York Central Railroad for conversion to a trolley line. Service ended on May 31, 1958. The line was quickly converted for trolley service, and the line including Brookline Village station reopened on July 4, 1959. The station building, like most on the line, was torn down during the conversion. Brookline Village was the only station on the line with a shelter on the outbound platform as well as the inbound platform; this was to accommodate riders changing for the Washington Street and Brookline Avenue bus routes.

The station has two side platforms serving the line's two tracks.

=== Renovations ===
In the early 2000s, the MBTA modified key surface stops with raised platforms for accessibility as part of the Light Rail Accessibility Program. Portable lifts were installed at Brookline Village around 2000 as a temporary measure, though it was not modified with raised platforms in 2002–03 as other stations were.

During the Brookline Village/Longwood Avenue Station Renovation Project, the MBTA reconstructed Longwood and Brookline Village stations for accessibility. The two stations received raised platforms to interface with low-floor LRVs, wooden ramps to access older high-floor LRVs, and other upgrades. Work on both stations began on July 23, 2007, and construction was completed in the second quarter of 2009.
