= Medical Area Total Energy Plant =

Combined heat and power plant in Boston, Massachusetts

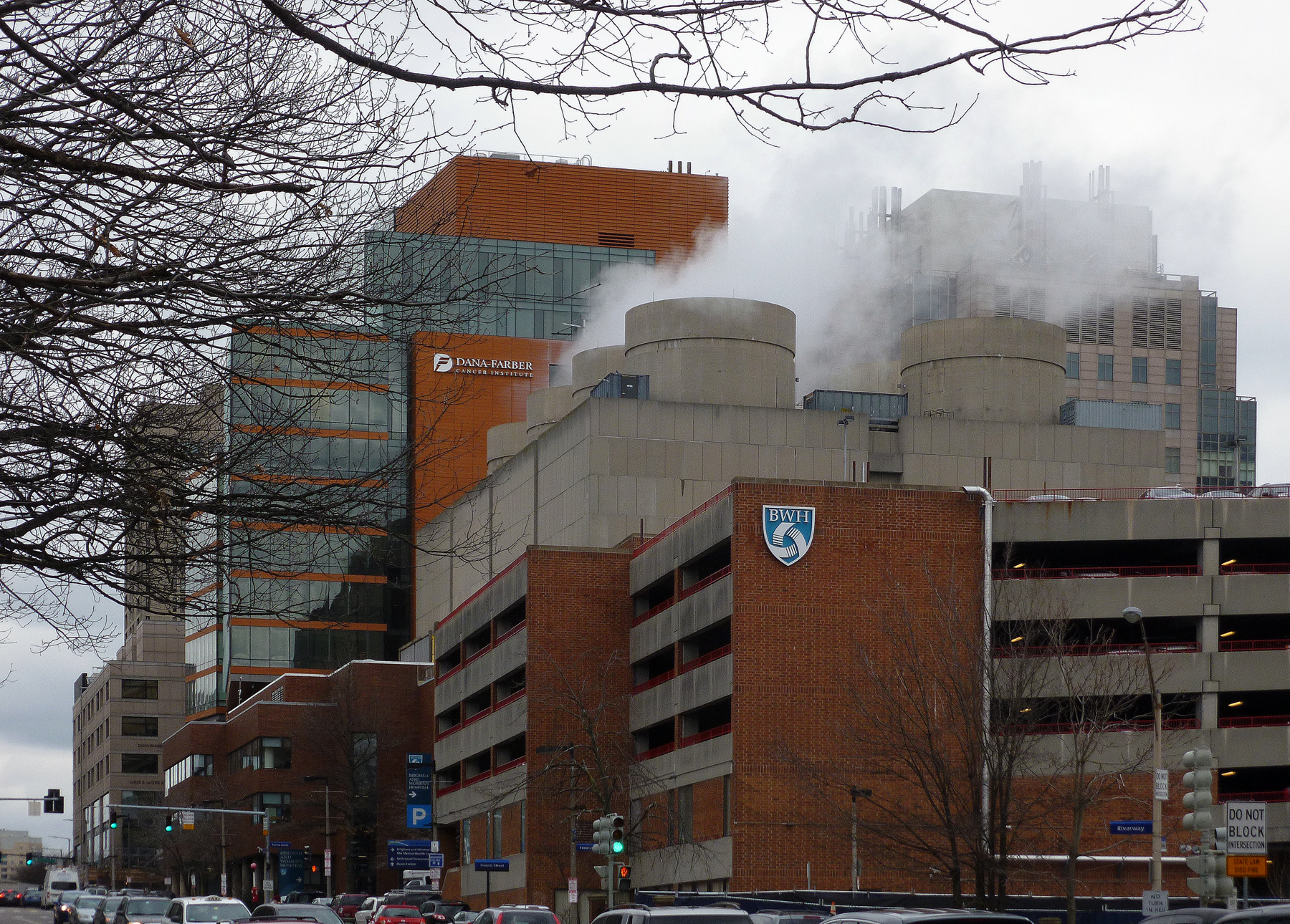
- MATEP as seen from Brookline Avenue
- Country: United States of America
- Location: Boston, Massachusetts
- Coordinates: 42°20′13″N 71°06′30″W
- Status: Commissioned
- Commission date: 1978
- Construction cost: $350 million
- Owner: Longwood Energy Partners
- Operators: ENGIE North America, Axium Infrastructure

Thermal power station
- Primary fuel: Natural gas
- Chimneys: 1
- Cooling towers: 8
- Cogeneration?: Yes

Power generation
- Units operational: 2 (steam turbines)
- Capacity factor: 88 MW

External links
- Website: https://www.matep.com

The Medical Area Total Energy Plant, in Boston, Massachusetts, is a gas-fired co-generation power plant providing steam, chilled water, and electricity to the Longwood Medical Area.

Proposed in 1974 and completed in 1986, the facility encountered fierce community opposition and cost $350 million‍—‌$310 million more than the originally projected $40 million.

== Sources ==
- Pasternack, Claire A. (June 4, 2003). "Total Energy to Total Disaster". The Harvard Crimson.
- "MATEP LLC - System Design & Benefits". MAETP LLC. 2022-09-23.
