= Fenway–Kenmore =

- Neighborhood of Boston
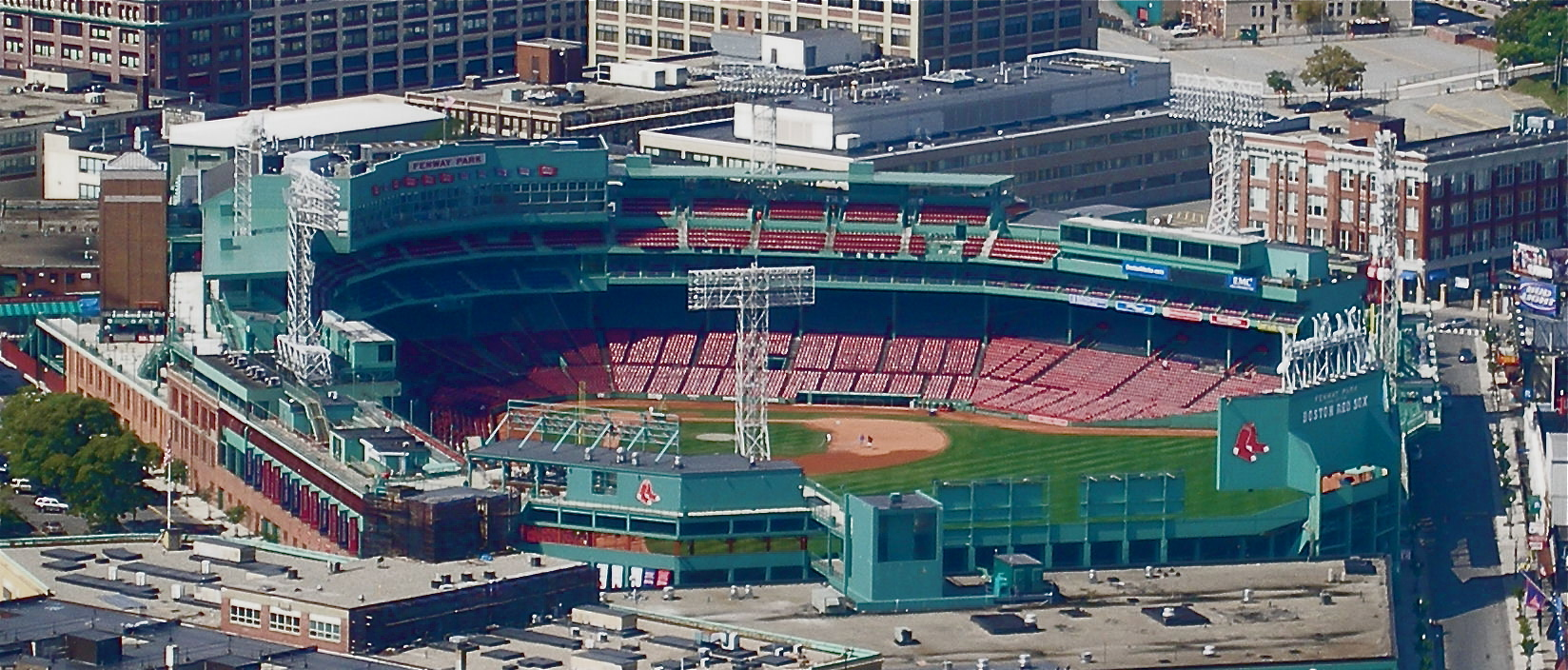
- Fenway Park, home of the Boston Red Sox, is located in the Fenway–Kenmore neighborhood.
- Interactive map of Fenway–Kenmore
- Coordinates: 42°20′31.39″N 71°06′00.91″W
- Country: United States
- State: Massachusetts
- County: Suffolk
- City: Boston

Area
  - Total: 1.24 sq mi (3.2 km^{2})

Population (2010)
  - Total: 40,898
  - Density: 32,982.3/sq mi (12,734.5/km^{2})
- Time zone: UTC-5 (Eastern)
- ZIP code(s): 02115, 02215
- Area codes: 617, 857

Fenway–Kenmore is an officially recognized neighborhood of Boston, Massachusetts. It is considered one neighborhood for administrative purposes, but it is composed of numerous distinct sections (East Fenway/Symphony, West Fenway, Audubon Circle, Kenmore Square) that are almost always referred to as "Fenway", "the Fenway", "Kenmore Square", or "Kenmore".

Fenway is named after the Fenway, the main thoroughfare laid out by Frederick Law Olmsted. Fenway–Kenmore's population was 40,898 as of the 2010 Boston Redevelopment Authority Census, while its land area was defined to be 1.24 square miles (3.2 km^{2}).

== Location ==
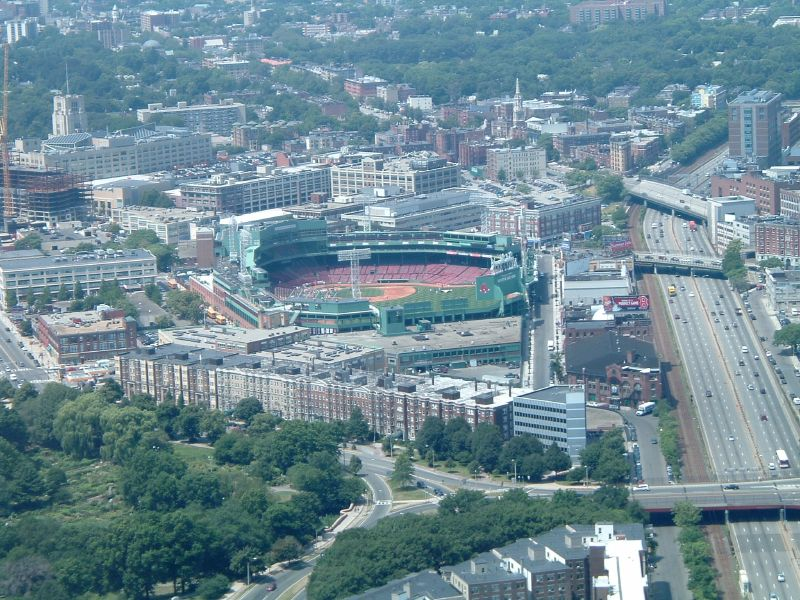
Aerial view of West Fenway and Kenmore showing the Back Bay Fens (lower left), Fenway Park (center) and the edge of Kenmore Square (right)

On the east, Fenway–Kenmore is separated from the Back Bay neighborhood by Charlesgate West, the Massachusetts Turnpike, Dalton Avenue and Belvidere Street. The South End is across Huntington Avenue near The First Church of Christ, Scientist headquarters, a major tourist attraction. East Fenway (generally south of the Massachusetts Turnpike) is separated from West Fenway by the Muddy River, which flows through the Back Bay Fens and into the Charles River north of Kenmore.

The Longwood Medical Area is sometimes included as a part of Fenway, and is located across the Back Bay Fens from the West Fenway area. To the south of the neighborhood is the Mission Hill area, which is sometimes considered to be part of Roxbury, which continues as the border extends along Ward, Parker, and Ruggles Streets, and the Southwest Corridor. The Kenmore neighborhood is located north and west of Fenway, roughly separated by the Massachusetts Turnpike. Kenmore includes the part of Boston University campus east of the Boston University Bridge, where it meets the Allston neighborhood, although due to the size of the university, it is sometimes considered to be its own neighborhood. Southwest of the Boston University campus and west of the Longwood Medical Area is the town of Brookline.

Throughout the neighborhood are brownstone townhouses, brick walk-ups, and five- to six-story apartment buildings, typically constructed between 1880 and 1930. Small, independently-owned shops are scattered throughout. Major commercial developments are in Kenmore Square and along Brookline Avenue, Beacon Street, Boylston Street, and Huntington Avenue. The baseball stadium Fenway Park is located immediately south of the Turnpike from Kenmore Square. Parts of Boston University, Northeastern University, the Berklee College of Music, and the Boston Conservatory of Music are located in Fenway–Kenmore, and many students reside in the neighborhood. Over the last 20 years almost every residential building in Kenmore has been purchased by Boston University and turned into dorms, especially in the Audubon Circle area between Beacon Street and Commonwealth Avenue.

== History ==
The Fenway–Kenmore area was formed by land annexed from neighboring Brookline in the 1870s as part of the Brookline-Boston annexation debate of 1873 as well as from land filled in conjunction with the creation of landscape architect Frederick Law Olmsted parks in the 1890s. When planned, it was thought that the buildings built upon the Fenway parkway would house high-wealth residents and that the whole area would be a high-class neighborhood. As property values rose, however, it was educational institutions that sprung up along the Fenway's route. By 1907, there were twenty-two educationally focused organizations, including nine college and universities which had made their homes on the Fenway. Residential buildings that were built needed their frontages to be approved by the Park Board so that a "poor looking building [did not] depreciate the value of the whole neighborhood". Additionally, the Board had discretion on whether it felt a proposed building was suitable for frontage along the park and parkway. The hope of these building restrictions was that there would be an improvement in the look of the Fenway compared to neighboring streets.

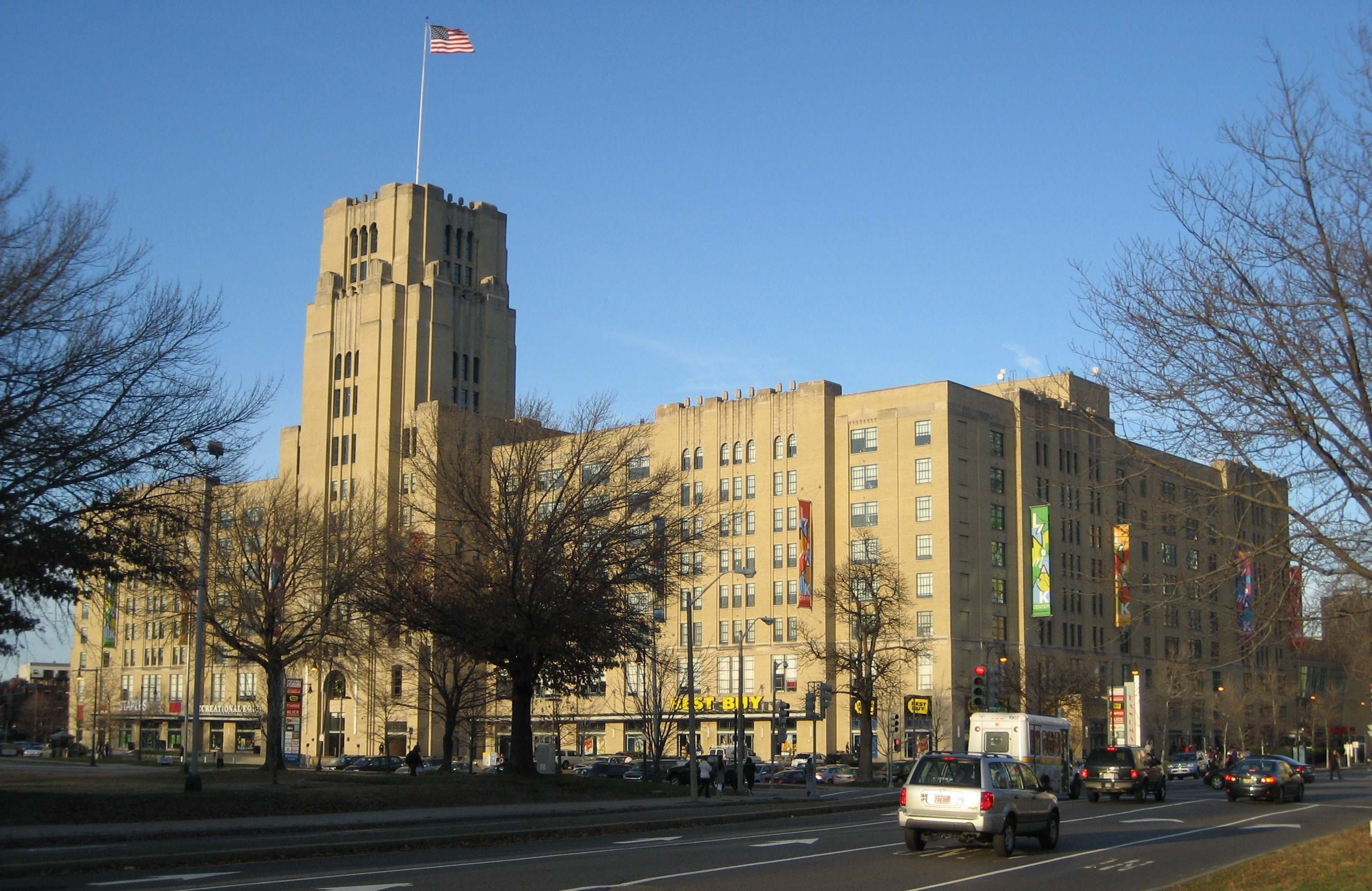
The Landmark Center was formerly a Sears mail order center and warehouse.

In the last few years, development in Fenway has picked up, particularly from developer Samuels and Associates. Recent developments include the renovation of the Landmark Center; the 2003 addition of Hotel Commonwealth on the site of the Rathskeller bar; and the 576-unit, 17-floor Trilogy apartment building on Brookline Avenue and Boylston Street. 1330 Boylston, a second high-rise apartment building, was completed in 2008 and contains 210 apartments, 85,000 square feet (7,900 m^{2}) of office space contained within 10 floors and the new home of Fenway Health.

Planned developments include a 24-story mixed use development at the confluence of Boylston Street and Brookline Avenue, likely including retail, dining, and luxury hotel/apartments. Other plans include the renovation of the Howard Johnson motel on Boylston Street, to be rehabbed as an upscale hotel. Additionally, developer John Rosenthal is planning to build a complex named One Kenmore over the Mass Pike alongside the Beacon Street Bridge, comprising 525 units in one 17 floor tower and one 20 floor tower. Concerning infrastructure, in 2007 the MBTA renovated the Fenway Green Line stop and in 2014 renovated the nearby Yawkey commuter rail station. Finally, the Museum of Fine Arts, Boston recently completed a $425 million expansion, and the Isabella Stewart Gardner Museum completed construction of a second building.

=== Street names ===
West Fenway features streets named after Scottish cities and towns present in Robert Burns' literary works; Peterborough, Kilmarnock, Queensberry. This was a result of influence by the (Robert) Burns Memorial Association of Boston influencing the city of Boston when a decision was made to simplify the original neighborhood plan by Frederick Law Olmsted's office. As originally planned in 1894, the street naming system was to continue the system originating in the Back Bay of naming streets in alphabetical order. Where the Back Bay proper ends at Hereford Street, the Fenway was to continue Ipswich, Jersey, Kenyon (Kilmarnock), Lansdowne, Mornington, Nottingham, Onslow, Peterborough, Queensberry, Roseberry, Salisbury, Thurlow, Uxbridge, Vivian, Westmeath (Wellesley), (with X omitted), York, and Zetland.

The parkways surrounding the Back Bay Fens, Fenway and Park Drive, are named after various parks which are part of the Emerald Necklace park system. Other streets in Fenway are named after institutions or civic minded patrons within the neighborhood: Palace Road (formerly Worthington Street), Forsyth Way (formerly Rogers Avenue), Evans Way, Forsyth Street, Hemenway Street (formerly Parker Avenue), Agassiz Road (named after Ida Agassiz), Higginson Circle (named after the founder of the Boston Symphony Orchestra), Evans Way (named after the donor of the Evans Wing at the Museum of Fine Arts), Tetlow Street (named after the headmaster of Girls Latin School at its former location), Symphony Road (formerly Batavia Road), St. Stephens Street (St. Stephen's Church became St. Ann's, which is now known as Northeastern University's Fenway Center), Opera Place (the Boston Opera House was demolished in 1958), and Speare Place (formerly a continuation of St. Stephens Street which itself was formerly Falmouth Street).

== Demographics ==
Historical population
Census	Pop.	Note	%±
1980	30,842		—
1990	32,880		6.6%
2000	36,191		10.1%
2010	40,989		13.3%

According to the census of 2000 and the City of Boston, there were 36,191 people, 12,872 households, and 5,428 families residing in the neighborhood. The population density was 29,186.3 people per square mile (11,268.9/km²). Of the neighborhood's housing structures, 1% were single-family dwellings while 15% had 3–9 units, 16% had 10–19 units, 41% had 20–49 units, and 27% had 50 or more units; there were 13,229 units in total. 91% percent of units were occupied by tenants while 9% were owner-occupied. The average household size was 1.69 people, while the average family size was 2.61 and non-family 1.51.

The racial makeup of the neighborhood was 71% White, 7% Black or African American, 14% Asian, 4% from other races, and 3% from two or more races. Hispanic or Latino of any race were 8% of the population. 21.3% of the population was foreign born.

The neighborhood population consisted of 4% under the age of 18, 63% from 18 to 24, 23% from 25 to 44, 6% from 45 to 64, and 5% who were 65 years of age or older. The median income for a household in the neighborhood was $25,356. 37.3% of the population was below the poverty line, while the unemployment rate was 11.4%.

East Fenway has a large student population due to its proximity to area colleges and universities, while West Fenway, formerly known as a student haven, has seen rising interest from young professionals and families. The Kenmore Square area is mainly commercial with many residential units now owned by Boston University and used as on-campus housing for students.

=== Race ===
Back Bay/Fenway–Kenmore (02115) Racial Breakdown of Population (2017)
Race	Percentage of 02115 population	Percentage of Massachusetts population	Percentage of United States population	ZIP Code-to-State Difference	ZIP Code-to-USA Difference
White	67.2%	81.3%	76.6%	–14.1%	–9.4%
White (Non-Hispanic)	60.7%	72.1%	60.7%	–11.4%	+0.0%
Asian	15.1%	6.9%	5.8%	+8.2%	+9.3%
Hispanic	13.2%	11.9%	18.1%	+1.3%	–4.9%
Black	8.9%	8.8%	13.4%	+0.1%	–4.5%
Native Americans/Hawaiians	0.3%	0.6%	1.5%	–0.3%	–1.2%
Two or more races	3.5%	2.4%	2.7%	+1.1%	+0.8%

Fenway–Kenmore (02215) Racial Breakdown of Population (2017)
Race	Percentage of 02215 population	Percentage of Massachusetts population	Percentage of United States population	ZIP Code-to-State Difference	ZIP Code-to-USA Difference
White	68.1%	81.3%	76.6%	–13.2%	–8.5%
White (Non-Hispanic)	61.6%	72.1%	60.7%	–10.5%	+0.9%
Asian	20.8%	6.9%	5.8%	+13.9%	+15.0%
Hispanic	10.7%	11.9%	18.1%	–1.2%	–7.4%
Black	4.1%	8.8%	13.4%	–4.7%	–9.3%
Native Americans/Hawaiians	0.1%	0.6%	1.5%	–0.5%	–1.4%
Two or more races	3.9%	2.4%	2.7%	+1.5%	+1.2%

=== Ancestry ===
According to the 2012–2016 American Community Survey 5-Year Estimates, the largest ancestry groups in ZIP Codes 02115 and 02215 are:

Ancestry	Percentage of 02115 population	Percentage of Massachusetts population	Percentage of United States population	ZIP Code-to-State Difference	ZIP Code-to-USA Difference
Irish	13.43%	21.16%	10.39%	–7.73%	+3.04%
Italian	10.57%	13.19%	5.39%	–2.61%	+5.18%
Chinese	7.82%	2.28%	1.24%	+5.54%	+6.58%
German	7.36%	6.00%	14.40%	+1.36%	–7.04%
English	4.89%	9.77%	7.67%	–4.88%	–2.77%
Polish	3.36%	4.67%	2.93%	–1.31%	+0.42%
Russian	3.20%	1.65%	0.88%	+1.55%	+2.33%
French	2.97%	6.82%	2.56%	–3.85%	+0.41%
Asian Indian	2.82%	1.39%	1.09%	+1.43%	+1.73%
Sub-Saharan African	2.67%	2.00%	1.01%	+0.67%	+1.66%
American	2.40%	4.26%	6.89%	–1.87%	–4.50%
Arab	2.12%	1.10%	0.59%	+1.02%	+1.53%
Mexican	2.00%	0.67%	11.96%	+1.33%	–9.96%
Puerto Rican	1.95%	4.52%	1.66%	–2.57%	+0.29%
French Canadian	1.79%	3.91%	0.65%	–2.12%	+1.13%
European	1.77%	1.08%	1.23%	+0.69%	+0.54%
Korean	1.39%	0.37%	0.45%	+0.67%	+0.89%
Scottish	1.16%	2.28%	1.71%	–1.12%	–0.55%
Greek	1.05%	1.22%	0.40%	–0.17%	+0.65%
Portuguese	1.05%	4.40%	0.43%	–3.35%	+0.62%
Swedish	1.05%	1.67%	1.23%	–0.62%	–0.18%

Ancestry	Percentage of 02215 population	Percentage of Massachusetts population	Percentage of United States population	ZIP Code-to-State Difference	ZIP Code-to-USA Difference
Irish	14.45%	21.16%	10.39%	–6.70%	+4.07%
Chinese	10.81%	2.28%	1.24%	+8.53%	+9.57%
Italian	10.73%	13.19%	5.39%	–2.46%	+5.33%
German	9.07%	6.00%	14.40%	+3.07%	–5.33%
English	5.62%	9.77%	7.67%	–4.15%	–2.05%
Polish	4.15%	4.67%	2.93%	–0.52%	+1.22%
Asian Indian	3.79%	1.39%	1.09%	+2.40%	+2.70%
Russian	3.69%	1.65%	0.88%	+2.04%	+2.82%
Arab	3.51%	1.10%	0.59%	+2.41%	+2.92%
French	3.43%	6.82%	2.56%	–3.40%	+0.87%
Puerto Rican	2.87%	4.52%	1.66%	–1.65%	+1.21%
Korean	2.62%	0.37%	0.45%	+2.25%	+2.17%
Mexican	2.22%	0.67%	11.96%	+1.55%	–9.74%
Greek	1.75%	1.22%	0.40%	+0.53%	+1.35%
European	1.70%	1.08%	1.23%	+0.61%	+0.47%
Scottish	1.70%	2.28%	1.71%	–0.59%	–0.02%
French Canadian	1.69%	3.91%	0.65%	–2.21%	+1.04%
American	1.60%	4.26%	6.89%	–2.66%	–5.29%
Swedish	1.28%	1.67%	1.23%	–0.39%	+0.05%
Dutch	1.02%	0.62%	1.32%	+0.40%	–0.30%

== Establishments ==
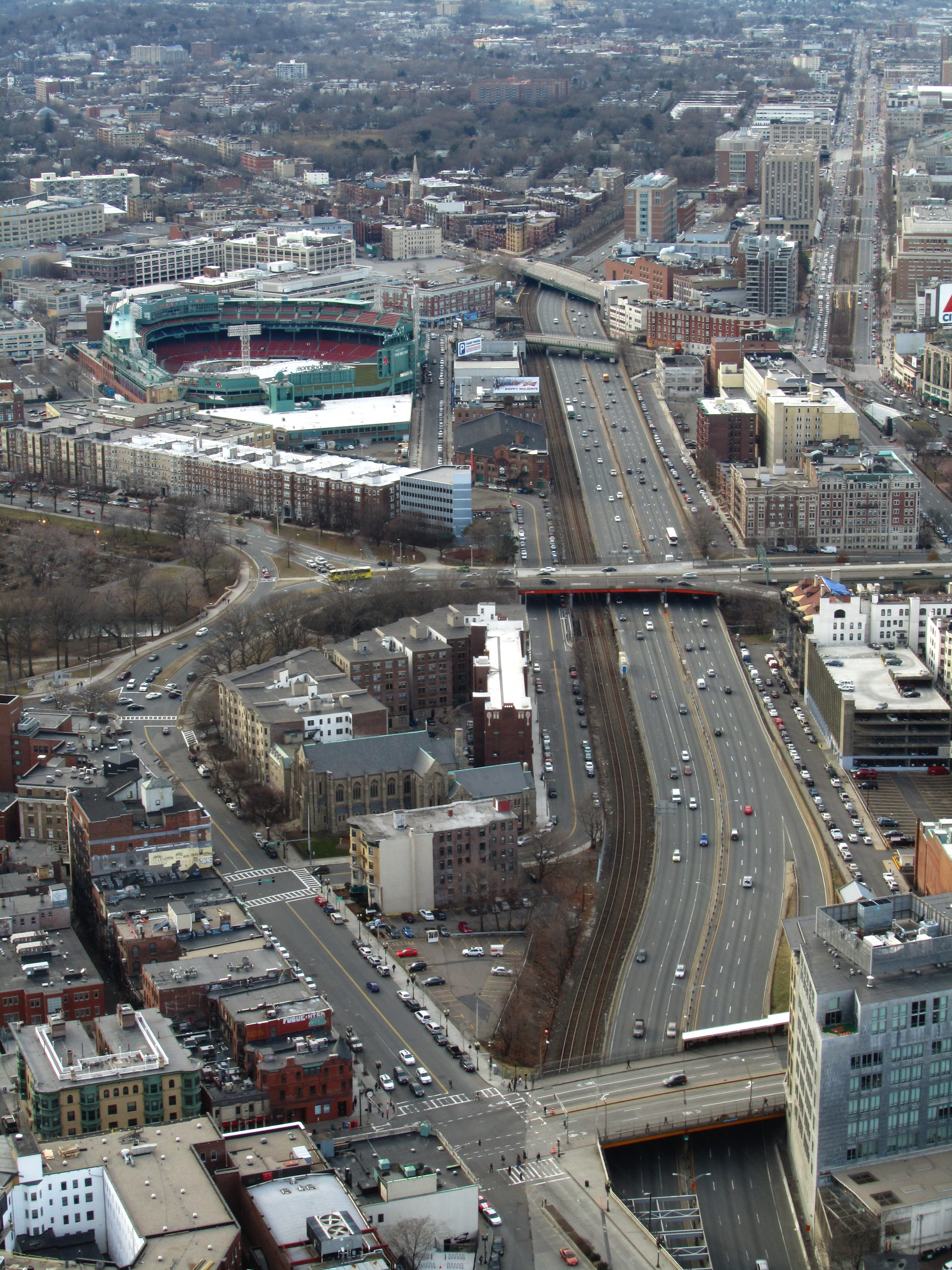
Fenway–Kenmore neighborhood seen from Prudential Skywalk, January 2012

It is the home of Fenway Park, the famous Boston Citgo sign, Kenmore Square, The Art Institute of Boston, The Forsyth Institute, Massachusetts College of Pharmacy and Health Sciences, Northeastern University, the New England Conservatory, portions of Boston University (including the Myles Standish Residence Hall), portions of the Harvard Medical School, Harvard School of Dental Medicine, Harvard T.H. Chan School of Public Health, Berklee College of Music, The Boston Conservatory, Massachusetts College of Art, Wentworth Institute of Technology, Simmons College, Wheelock College, Emmanuel College, New England School of Photography, Holy Trinity Orthodox Cathedral, the Isabella Stewart Gardner Museum and the Museum of Fine Arts, Boston.

== Transportation ==
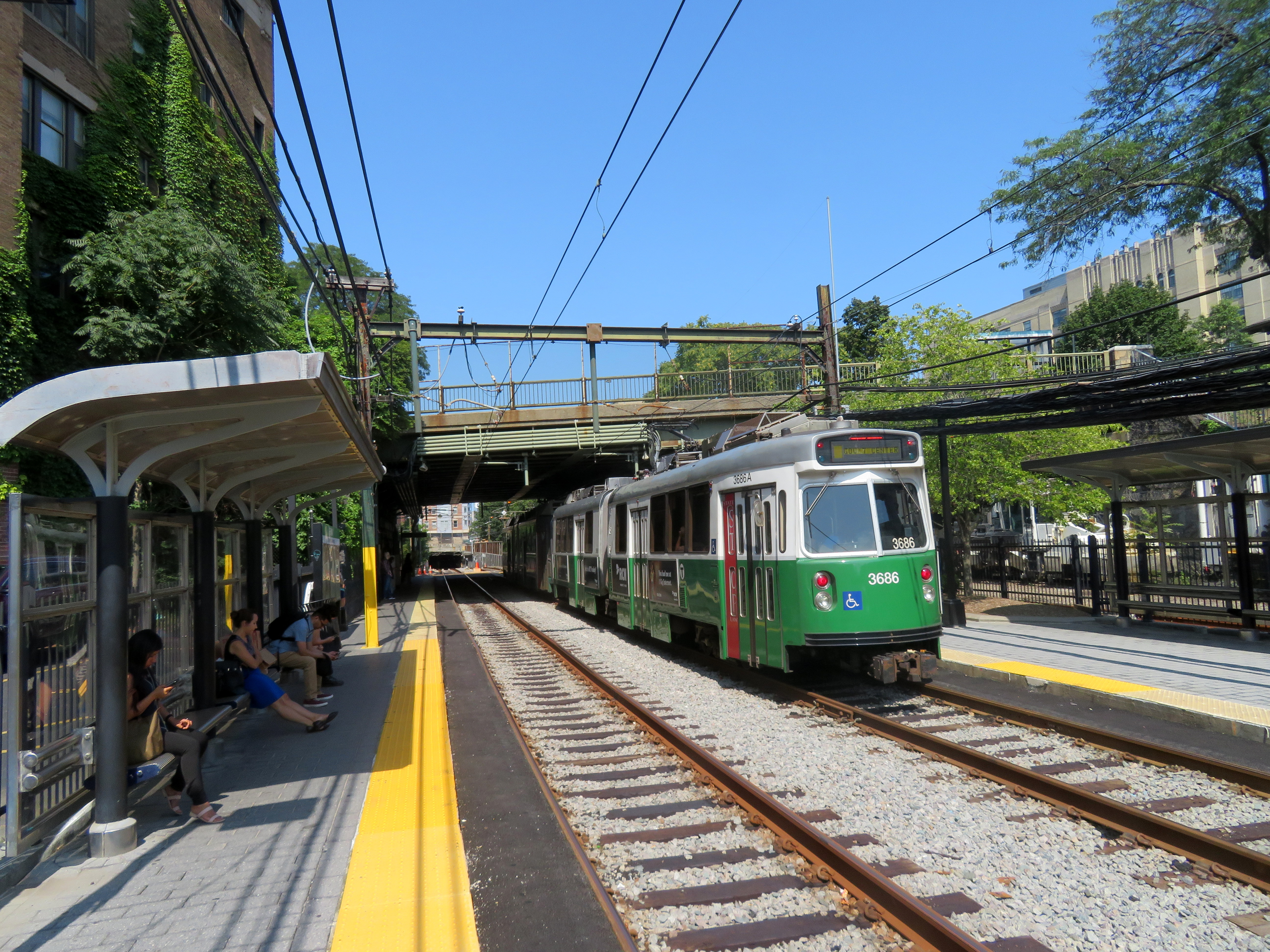
A Green Line train at Fenway station

The neighborhood is ringed by the MBTA Orange Line Ruggles subway station and the following MBTA Green Line light rail stops:

- Kenmore – B, C, D
- Fenway – D
- Saint Mary's Street – C
- Symphony – E
- Northeastern University – E
- Museum of Fine Arts – E

Lansdowne station on the Framingham/Worcester Line of the MBTA Commuter Rail is located near Fenway Park and Kenmore Square and is served by all trains on the line. Fenway–Kenmore is also served by a number of MBTA buses connecting it to the city proper and the surrounding neighborhoods and communities.

As for roadways, Fenway and Park Drive circulate around the Fens. Boylston Street is a major east–west route, as are Beacon Street (MA 2) and Commonwealth Avenue (U.S. 20), which intersect at Kenmore Square. Brookline Avenue begins in Kenmore Square at this intersection and proceeds southwest. Huntington Avenue (MA 9) is on the southern border, while Massachusetts Avenue forms the eastern border, and is a major north–south route. Storrow Drive is the only freeway directly serving the neighborhood, and its Charlesgate exit complex provides access to the entire neighborhood, with ramps connecting to Kenmore Square, Boylston Street, and Park Drive. Although the Massachusetts Turnpike cuts through the neighborhood, there are no access points to it except westbound only at Massachusetts Avenue and Newbury Street.
