= Longwood Medical and Academic Area =

Medical campus in Boston, Massachusetts

Coordinates: 42.3382°N 71.1060°W

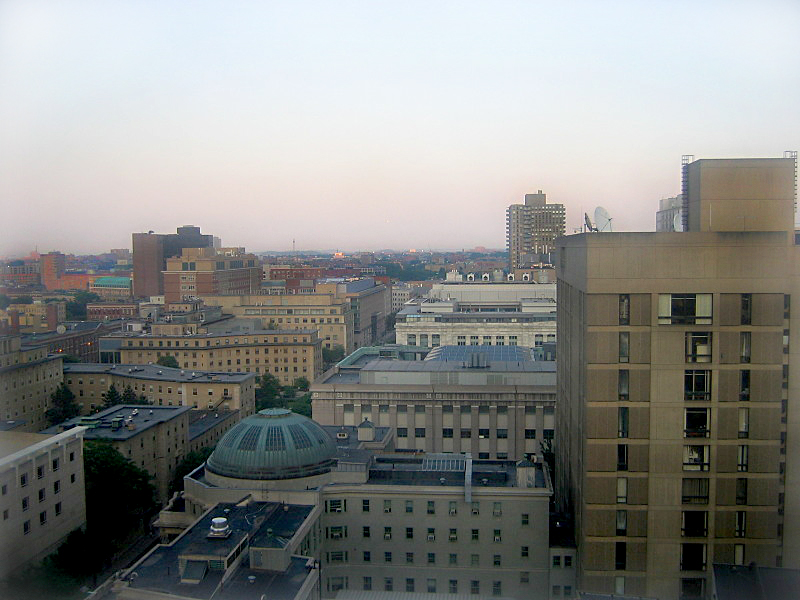
View over Longwood Medical and Academic Area facing Huntington Avenue

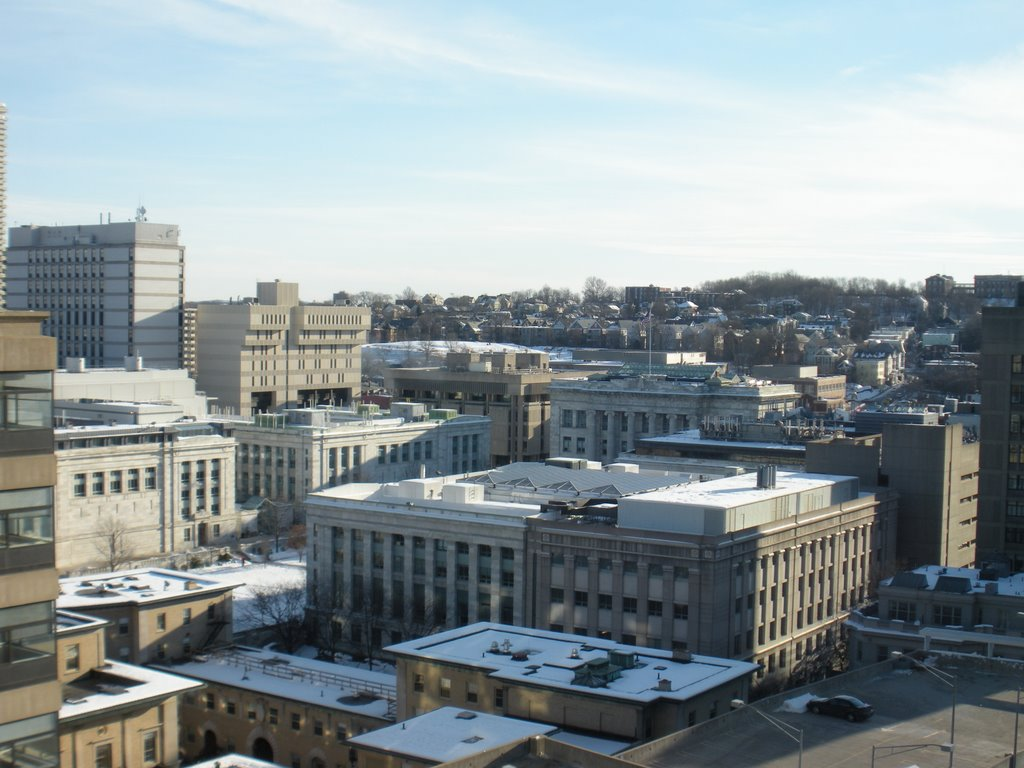
The quadrangle of Harvard Medical School and adjacent Longwood Medical and Academic Area buildings

The Longwood Medical and Academic Area, also known as Longwood Medical Area, LMA, or simply Longwood, is a medical campus in Boston, Massachusetts. Flanking Longwood Avenue, LMA is adjacent to the Fenway–Kenmore, Audubon Circle, and Mission Hill neighborhoods, as well as the town of Brookline.

The campus houses several schools associated with Harvard University, including Harvard Medical School, Harvard T.H. Chan School of Public Health, Harvard School of Dental Medicine, Harvard's teaching hospitals, and several institutions not formally affiliated with Harvard. Long known as a global center of research, institutions in the Longwood Medical Area secured over $1.2 billion in NIH funds in 2018, which exceeds NIH funding received by 44 states.

== Hospitals and research institutions ==
- Beth Israel Deaconess Medical Center
- Boston Children's Hospital
- Brigham and Women's Hospital
- Dana–Farber Cancer Institute
- Joslin Diabetes Center
- Massachusetts Mental Health Center
- New England Baptist Hospital
- Wyss Institute for Biologically Inspired Engineering

== Schools and colleges ==
- Boston Latin School
- Boston University Wheelock College of Education & Human Development
- Emmanuel College
- Harvard Medical School
- Harvard School of Dental Medicine
- Harvard T.H. Chan School of Public Health
- Massachusetts College of Art and Design
- Massachusetts College of Pharmacy and Health Sciences
- Simmons University
- Wentworth Institute of Technology
- Winsor School

== Transportation ==
LMA is served by two subway stations at opposite ends of Longwood Avenue:

- Longwood station on the MBTA Green Line's "D" branch; and
- Longwood Medical Area on the Green Line E branch

Several public bus routes serve the area and commuter rail service is available at nearby Ruggles Station. The Longwood Collective, formerly known as MASCO (Medical Area and Scientific Community Organization)), offers shuttle buses for affiliated personnel around the Longwood Medical Area and between Harvard University's main campus in Cambridge and its medical campus in Boston. The medical campus shuttle, known as M2, is free for passengers holding a Harvard ID. Shuttles are also offered to JFK/UMass, Ruggles, and Lansdowne Stations, in addition to satellite Fenway parking lots, the Landmark Center at Fenway, The Harvard T.H. Chan School of Public Health, and to the Renaissance & Columbus Parking Garages. A number of additional stops are listed on the Longwood Collective Website.

== Energy ==
LMA receives electrical power, cooling, and heating from a trigeneration (CCHP) facility, the Medical Area Total Energy Plant (MATEP).

== Lodging ==
- Inn at Longwood Medical
- Longwood Inn
- The Baldwin at Longwood Medical Centre
- Yawkey Family Inn

== See also ==
- Channing Home
