= Lansdowne station (MBTA) =

Railway station in Boston, Massachusetts, US

Lansdowne
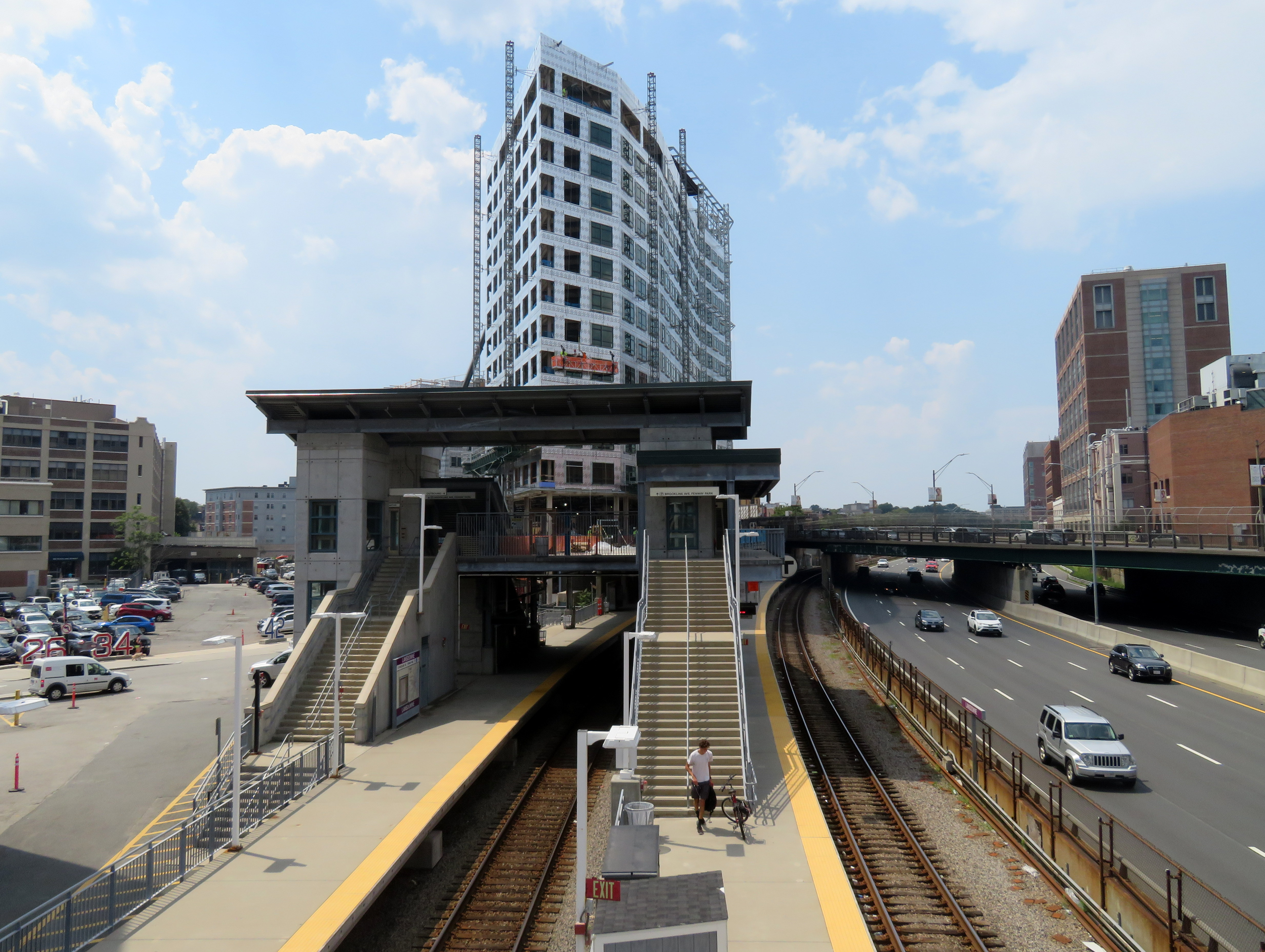
- Fenway Center construction over Lansdowne station in July 2019

General information
- Location: 85 Brookline Avenue; Boston, Massachusetts
- Coordinates: 42.3476°N 71.1006°W
- Line: Worcester Main Line
- Platforms: 2 side platforms
- Tracks: 2
- Connections: MBTA bus: 8, 19, 60, 65; At Kenmore: 57

Construction
- Accessible: Yes

Other information
- Fare zone: 1A

History
- Opened: April 29, 1988
- Rebuilt: March 10, 2014
- Former names: Yawkey

Passengers
- 2024: 1,348 daily boardings

Services
Preceding station	MBTA	Following station
Boston Landing toward Worcester	Framingham/Worcester Line	Back Bay toward South Station
Location

Lansdowne station (formerly Yawkey station) is an MBTA Commuter Rail station in Boston, Massachusetts. It serves the Framingham/Worcester Line. Lansdowne is located next to the Massachusetts Turnpike in the Fenway–Kenmore neighborhood near Kenmore Square, below grade between Beacon Street and Brookline Avenue.

The station, originally named after former Boston Red Sox owner Tom Yawkey, opened as an infill station in 1988, for limited service to baseball games at Fenway Park. Regular commuter service began in 2001 for riders headed to Boston University, Kenmore Square, and the Longwood Medical and Academic Area. Inbound and outbound trains formerly shared a single two-car platform on the inbound track, requiring passengers to embark or debark from the front two cars of outbound trains or the rear two cars of inbound trains.

In 2012, work began on a new, fully accessible station, including two longer high-level platforms and an overhead pedestrian bridge. Passengers boarded from the east end of the new station from June 2013 until March 10, 2014; after delays, it opened fully that day. The new station is served by all Worcester Line trains; by 2024, ridership at the station was quadruple that from 2007. The Fenway Center air rights development, which is partially over the station, added a pedestrian deck connecting the station to Beacon Street. The station was renamed Lansdowne (after nearby Lansdowne Street) effective April 8, 2019, following the May 2018 renaming of Yawkey Way back to Jersey Street.

== Station design ==
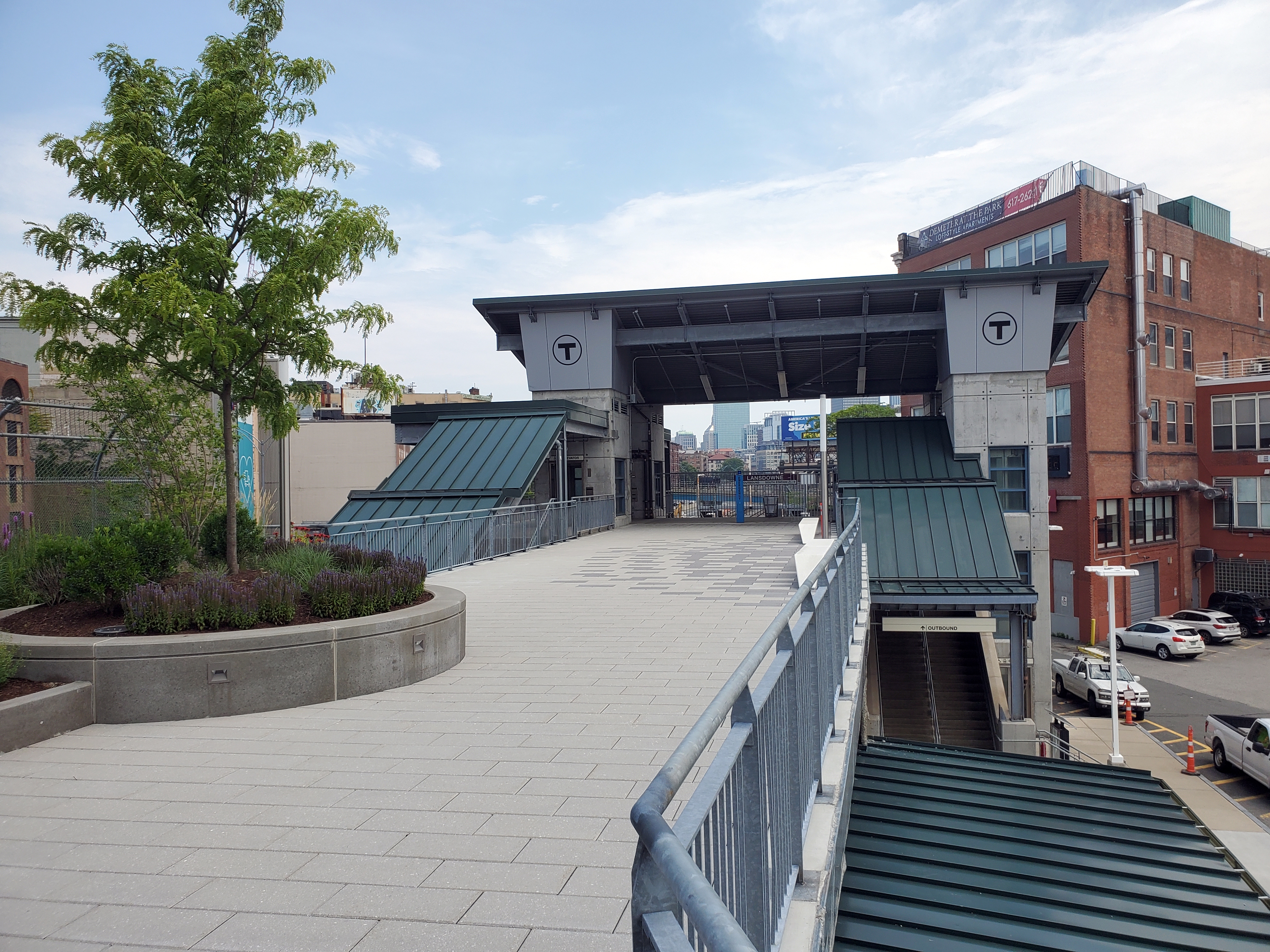
The Fenway Center pedestrian deck and the station footbridge

The station is fully accessible, with two full-length high-level platforms serving the two tracks of the Worcester Main Line. The station has an unusual platform layout, where the outbound side platform is between the tracks rather than to the side. This is because the station is located on a tight curve; doors located on the end of passenger cars would have gaps next to a convex platform.

A footbridge with elevators and stairs connects the platforms to Overland Street. The Fenway Center pedestrian deck covers the west portion of the platforms, connecting Beacon Street and the station footbridge. Staircases to Beacon Street are also available from the west ends of the platforms.

Four MBTA bus routes – 8, 19, 60, and 65 – stop on Brookline Avenue at Jersey Street. Kenmore station, located 0.25 miles (0.40 km) to the northeast along Brookline Avenue, provides connections to the B, C, and D branches of the MBTA Green Line, as well as bus route 57.

== History ==
=== Former stations ===
The Boston and Worcester Railroad (B&W) opened to West Newton on April 16, 1834, and was extended westwards soon after. An early station was located at the west end of the Boston & Roxbury Mill Dam, near what is now Kenmore Square. It was established in 1844 or 1845 as a stop for Newton–Boston commuter trains. The station was variously known as Beacon Street, Mill Dam, Brookline, and Brookline Junction — the latter name reflecting the Brookline branch (later the Highland branch), which opened in 1848. By 1857, passenger service there was replaced with Cottage Farm station (later University station), a flag stop at Commonwealth Avenue in the Cottage Farm neighborhood. Mill Dam station remained in use by Brookline branch trains for some time. The Boston and Albany Railroad (successor to the B&W) maintained a freight yard at Brookline Junction into the 20th century.

Service on the Highland branch ran until May 31, 1958, when it was abandoned for conversion to the Riverside Line; a stub remained at Brookline Junction until the 1970s for freight service. The B&A attempted to drop all service to University, Brighton, and Faneuil in February 1958; however, minimal service was maintained until the railroad discontinued all commuter stops east of Newtonville in April 1959. Remaining commuter service on the line was subsidized by the Massachusetts Bay Transportation Authority (MBTA) beginning in 1973, eventually coming under full public control as the Framingham Line.

=== Game-day service ===
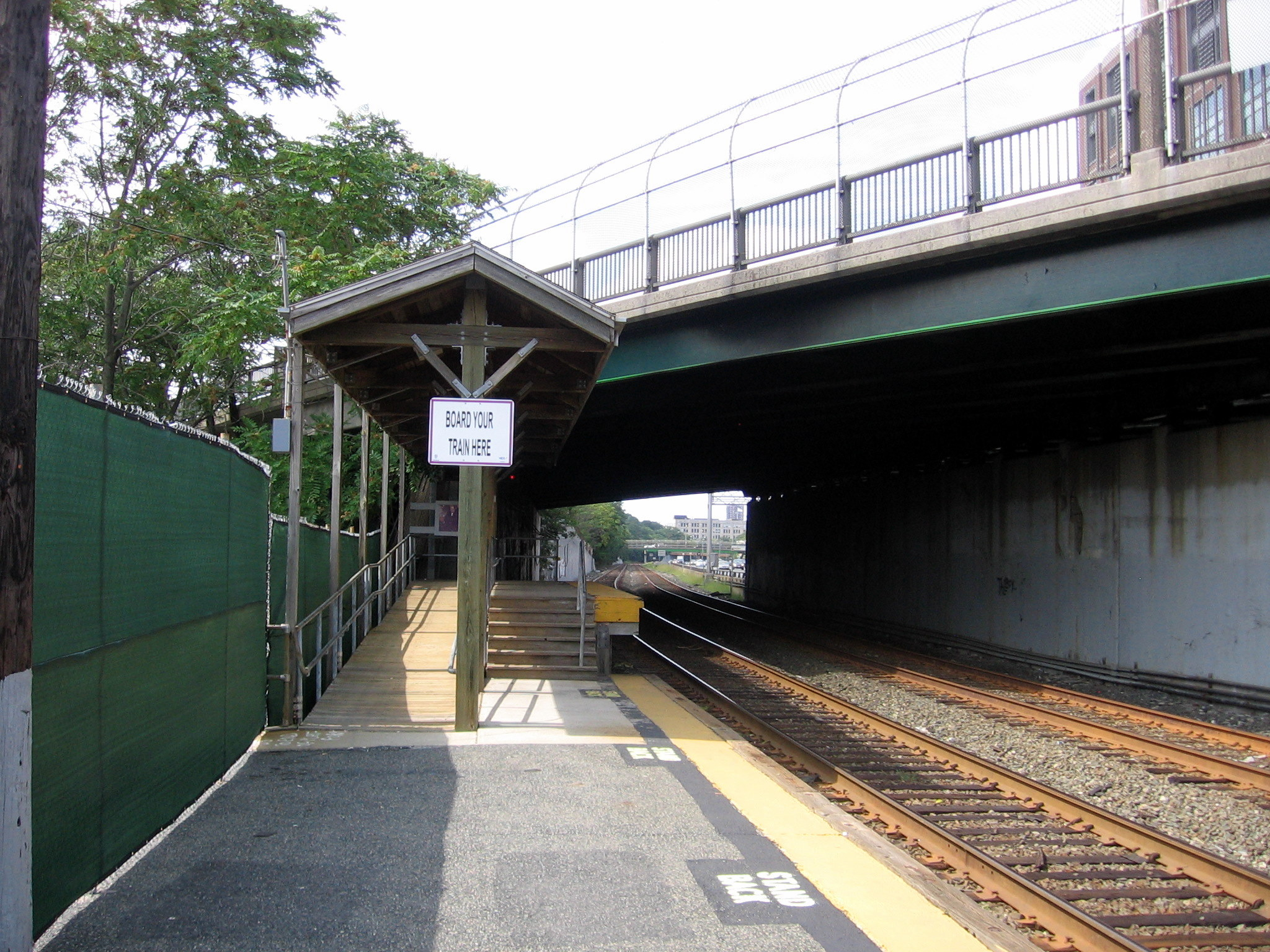
The 1990s-built "mini-high" platform at Yawkey (removed in 2013)

Originally named in honor of long-time Boston Red Sox owner Tom Yawkey, the station was opened on April 29, 1988, and initially was only used for special service to Fenway Park for baseball games. It was used by Framingham Line trains as well as special weekend-only "Fenway Flyer" baseball trains from the Attleboro (now Providence/Stoughton), Fairmount, and Franklin lines. Service from the Attleboro and Fairmount lines began on July 12, 1988, followed by the Franklin Line on July 27. The "Fenway Flyer" trains had an annual ridership of 58,000 in 1990. The station became popular enough that the MBTA added regular commuter service. This largely obviated the need for "Fenway Flyer" specials, though certain weekend Providence trains ran to Yawkey as late as 2007. Similar special trains continue to serve Foxboro station during football and soccer games and special events at Gillette Stadium.

The station was built with a low-level asphalt platform and was not initially accessible. With the pending passage of the Americans with Disabilities Act of 1990 (ADA), the MBTA began a project to build a mini-high platform on March 14, 1990. However, the mini-high platform only served one of the line's two tracks, limiting the number of trains that could stop at the station.

=== Regular service ===
In early 2000, the MBTA released a study which analyzed the possibility of full-time commuter service to then-Yawkey station to serve workers at nearby Boston University, Kenmore Square, and the Longwood Medical and Academic Area. An addendum released in August 2000 analyzed increased service (on all modes) to Fenway Park on game days. Possibilities studied included running game day service from the Plymouth/Kingston Line with an unused trainset, a South Station-Yawkey shuttle, increased Green Line service, and bus shuttles to the Red Line in Cambridge and to Ruggles station. Consideration was given to building a dedicated terminal spur and station on the remains of the former Highland branch.

Regular weekday commuter service to the station began on January 2, 2001, with four daily round trips. Weekend service was still initially limited to game days. Regular weekend service was added on April 30, 2001. From 2001 to 2014, not all trains stopped at the station; most peak-direction trains stopped, but many off-peak trains did not. Before the rebuilding began in 2012, some trains stopped at the station only on game days during the Red Sox season.

=== New station ===
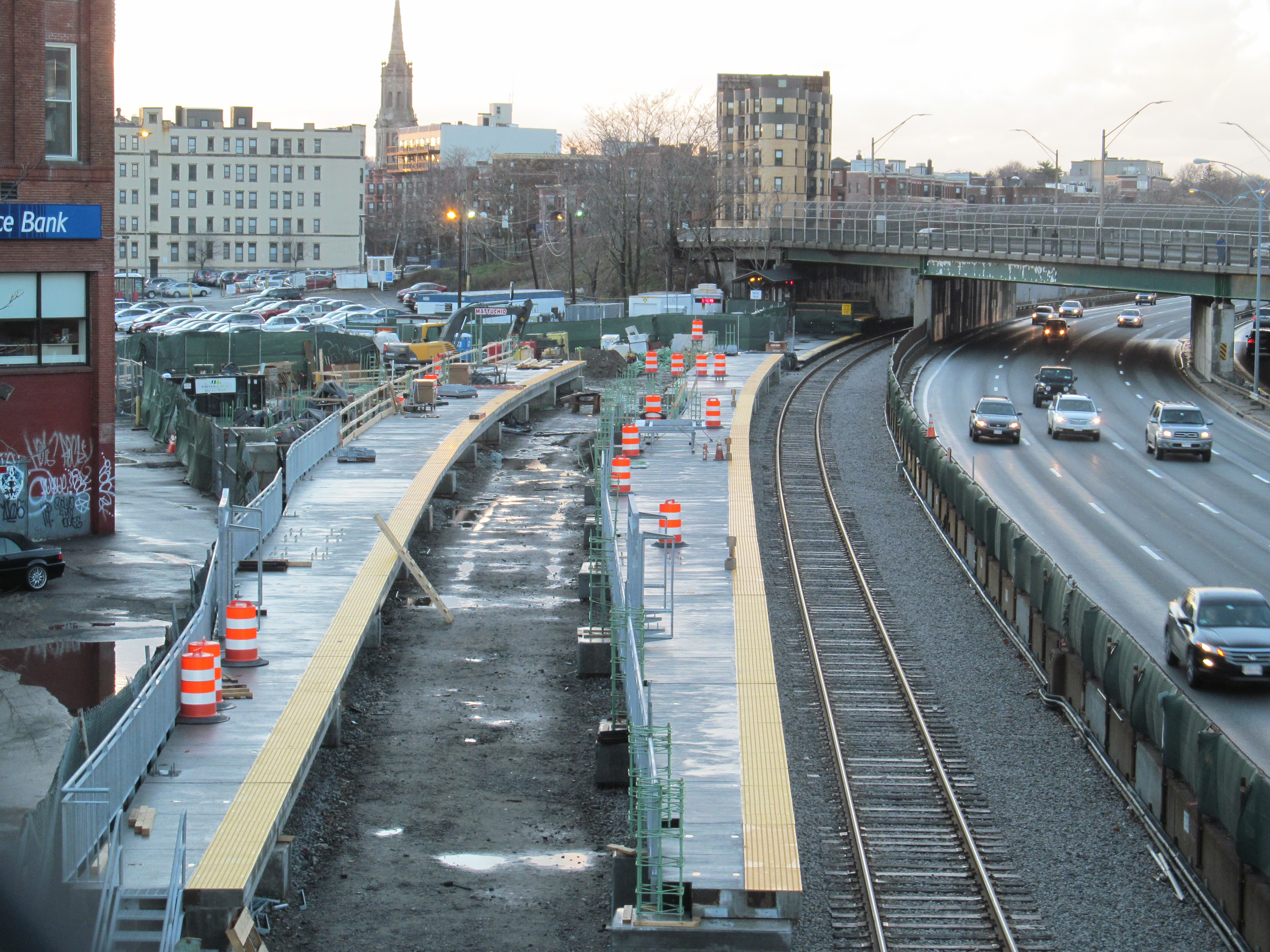
New platforms under construction in December 2012

In August 2007, the MBTA published a feasibility study exploring the possibility of rebuilding the station as a full-service station. The recommended alternative had a footbridge in the center of the platform, with elevators to the Beacon Street bridge. The study concluded that full service to the rebuilt station would increase ridership by 60%, from 585 daily boardings and alightings to 937. On November 15, 2010, Governor Deval Patrick and other officials broke ground on a major rebuilding of the station, originally expected to be completed in the spring of 2012. The new station has two full-length high-level platforms that provide level, accessible boarding for all passengers; the old platform had only a wooden ramp for accessibility. The two 700-foot-long platforms (a side platform between the tracks plus a side platform on the south side of the tracks) are connected with an overpass, and passengers no longer have to cross the tracks to access certain outbound trains.

The rebuilt station was intended to be the first component of a larger, mostly private development called Fenway Center. The new station, which cost about $13.5 million, was planned to be powered entirely by solar panels after the development opened. Although the developer wished to close the station during rebuilding, the MBTA elected to keep it open. Fenway Center, which was to be built on the air rights over the adjacent Massachusetts Turnpike (I-90), would eventually cover much of the station. As part of the development, walkways would be built above the station, allowing passengers to walk directly to the pedestrian bridge and platforms from Beacon Street and Brookline Avenue rather than passing through private parking lots. After lengthy negotiations, an air-rights deal between the city and the developer regarding Fenway Center was reached in May 2013.

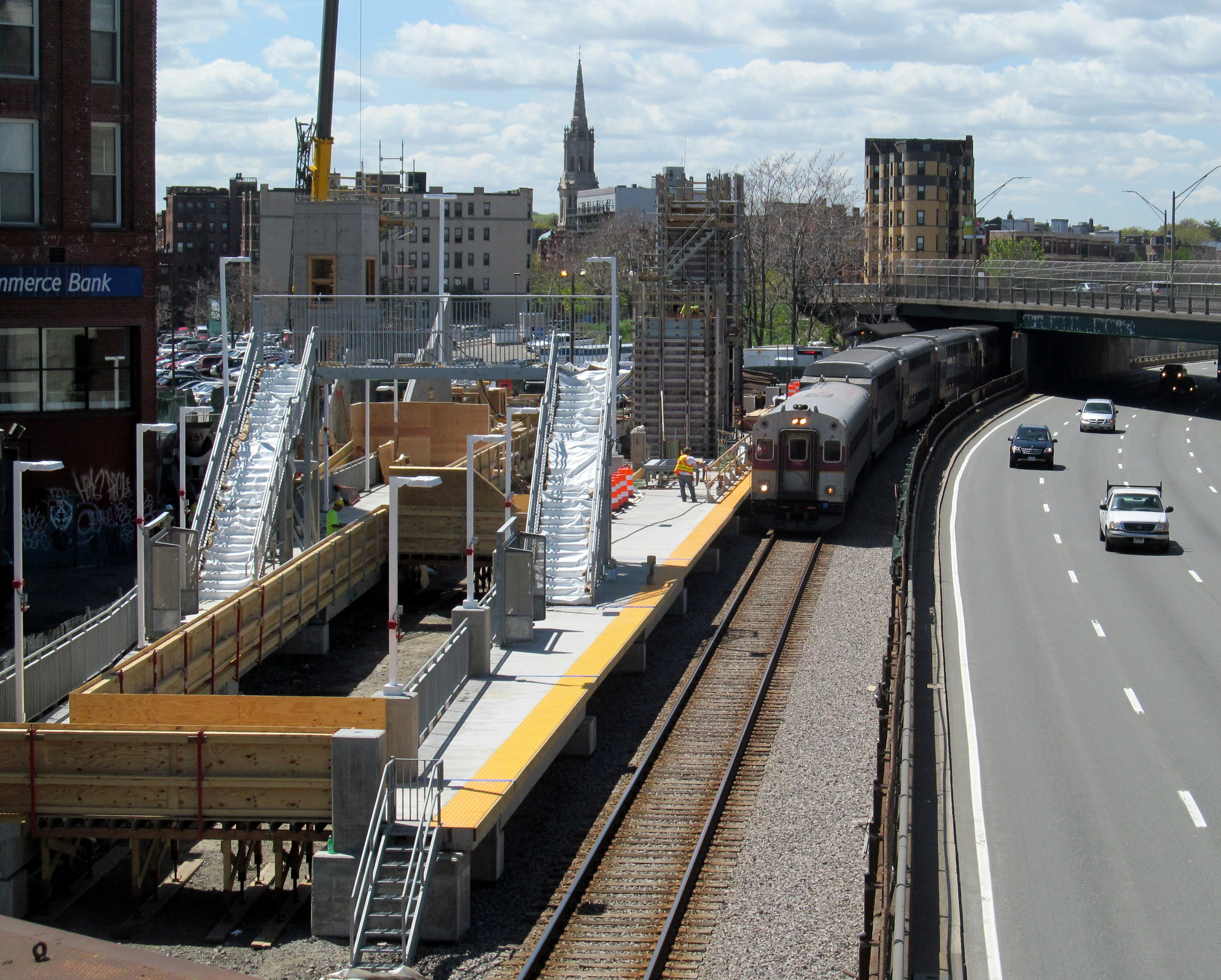
A train passes the under-construction station in May 2013

The Framingham/Worcester line schedule was changed slightly in April 2012 to allow for temporary single-tracking through the station for construction. Actual station construction activity started in June 2012, and in August one track was cut, reducing the line to one track through the station. The platforms were installed in late November 2012; construction of the elevator shafts began in February 2013. A temporary ramp opened in June 2013 for passengers to use the east end of the future outbound platform; the old platform was demolished soon afterwards to make room for the west ends of the new platforms. The pedestrian bridge was lifted into place in August 2013, followed by the various roof and canopy elements. The second track was rebuilt in late September, followed by the remaining platform segments.

The new station fully opened on March 10, 2014, coinciding with planned service increases on the Framingham/Worcester Line. Before the reconstruction, 17 trains stopped at the station each weekday; after, all 48 daily trains (24 round trips) stopped. The opening was first planned for January 13, then January 27, but was delayed due to problems with the station's elevators and adjustments to the schedule based on public comment. The walkway between the new station and Fenway Park includes large lit statues of the uniform numbers retired by the Red Sox.

In July 2017, the developer and the state reached an agreement under which the buildings south of the station would be built first. The developer paid the state $21 million for the right to delay building the deck. The lease agreement was finalized that December. The first phase of the project added a pedestrian deck over the west part of the platforms, connecting to Beacon Street and the station footbridge. The Beacon Street staircases were closed on December 1, 2018, due to the construction of Fenway Center. They were originally expected to reopen in March 2020, though this was delayed into 2021. After special events, such as concerts at Fenway Park, the MBTA sometimes runs special commuter rail shuttles from Lansdowne to South Station.

Lansdowne is a proposed intermediate station for East-West Rail, which would provide intercity passenger service between Boston and Pittsfield.

=== Cancelled plans ===
The station was a proposed stop on the Urban Ring – a circumferential bus rapid transit (BRT) line designed to connect the existing radial MBTA rail lines to reduce overcrowding in the downtown stations. Under draft plans released in 2008, the Urban Ring would have accessed the station via Mountfort Street to the north and a new tunnel paralleling the Green Line D branch to the southwest, with a turnoff and surface station at Overland Street. The project was cancelled in 2010

In 2014, it was revealed by the state that the stop would be part of the proposed Indigo Line system with frequent DMU service, but that plan was canceled in 2015.

=== Renaming ===
In December 2015, The Boston Globe columnist Adrian Walker proposed renaming Yawkey Way and Yawkey station after alleging their namesake, Tom Yawkey, was a racist who made the Red Sox the last major league team to hire black players. In August 2017, amid heightened media coverage of the removal of Confederate monuments and memorials in the United States, the Red Sox organization began advocating for the city to change the street's name. A bill to change the station's name was filed in the state legislature. Changing the street name was approved in April 2018 and implemented in May 2018. The MBTA announced that the station would also be renamed, though a new name was not immediately determined. On March 28, 2019, the MBTA announced that the station would be renamed Lansdowne (after nearby Lansdowne Street) effective April 8.
