= Cleveland Circle and Reservoir =

Cleveland Circle and Reservoir collectively refers to adjacent stops on different branches of the Massachusetts Bay Transportation Authority's Green Line, located at Beacon Street and Chestnut Hill Avenue at Cleveland Circle, in the Brighton neighborhood of Boston:

- Cleveland Circle, a surface station on the Green Line C branch.
- Reservoir, a surface station on the Green Line D branch.
