= Chestnut Hill station (MBTA) =

Light rail station in Newton, Massachusetts, US

Chestnut Hill
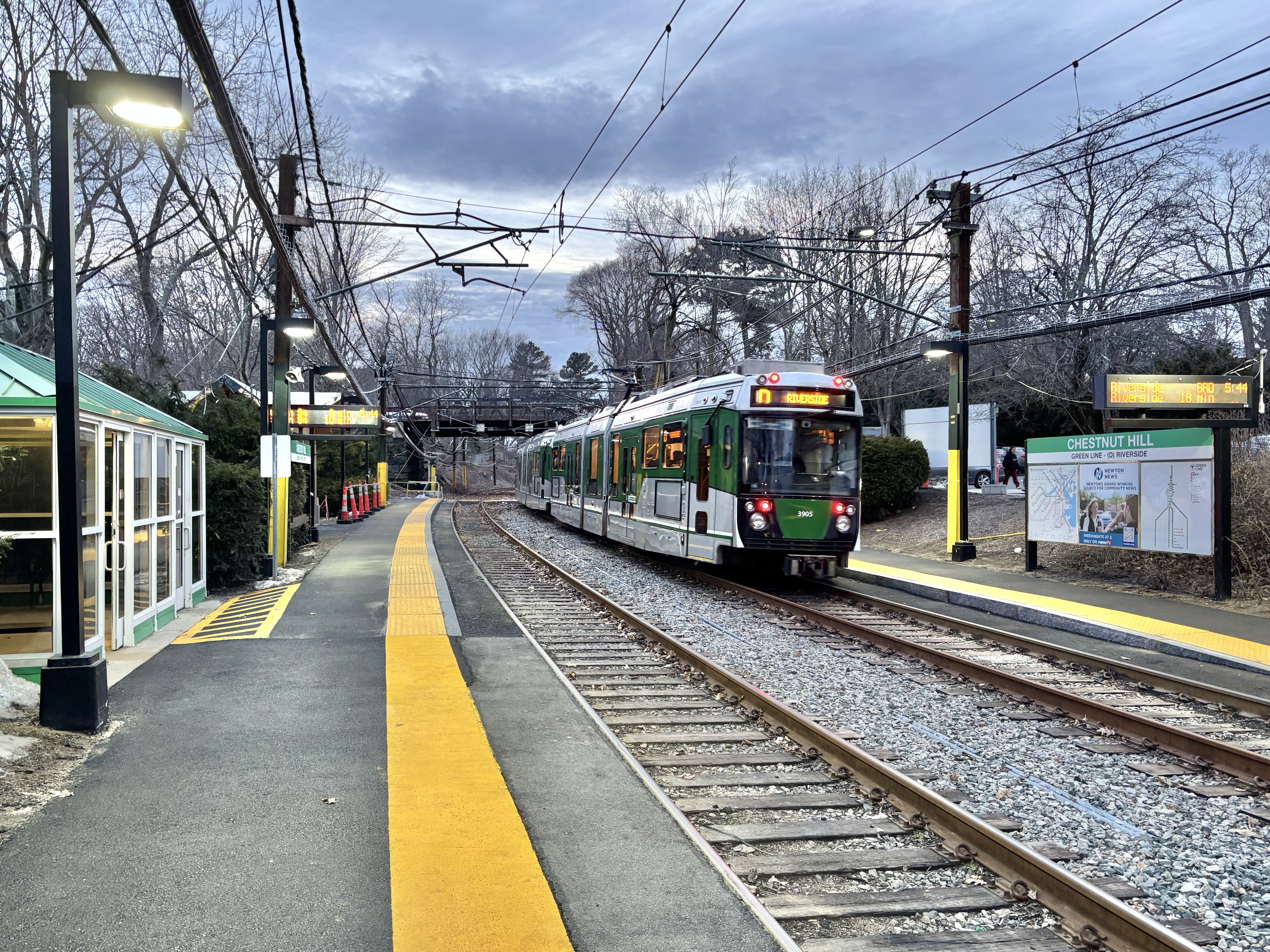
- An outbound train leaving Chestnut Hill station in March 2025

General information
- Location: Hammond Street and Chestnut Hill Road; Chestnut Hill, Newton, Massachusetts
- Coordinates: 42.32676°N 71.16461°W
- Line: Highland branch
- Platforms: 2 side platforms
- Tracks: 2

Construction
- Parking: 69 spaces
- Cycle facilities: Covered racks
- Accessible: Yes

History
- Opened: July 4, 1959
- Rebuilt: October 2024; additional work planned

Passengers
- 2013: 1,416 daily boardings

Services
Preceding station	MBTA	Following station
Newton Centre toward Riverside	Green Line D branch	Reservoir toward Union Square
Former services
Preceding station	New York Central Railroad	Following station
Newton Centre toward Riverside	Highland branch	Reservoir toward Boston
Location

Chestnut Hill station is a light rail station on the MBTA Green Line D branch, located off Hammond Street north of Massachusetts Route 9 in the Chestnut Hill neighborhood of Newton, Massachusetts. The station has two side platforms serving the line's two tracks. Chestnut Hill station was made accessible in October 2024; additional reconstruction is planned.

== History ==
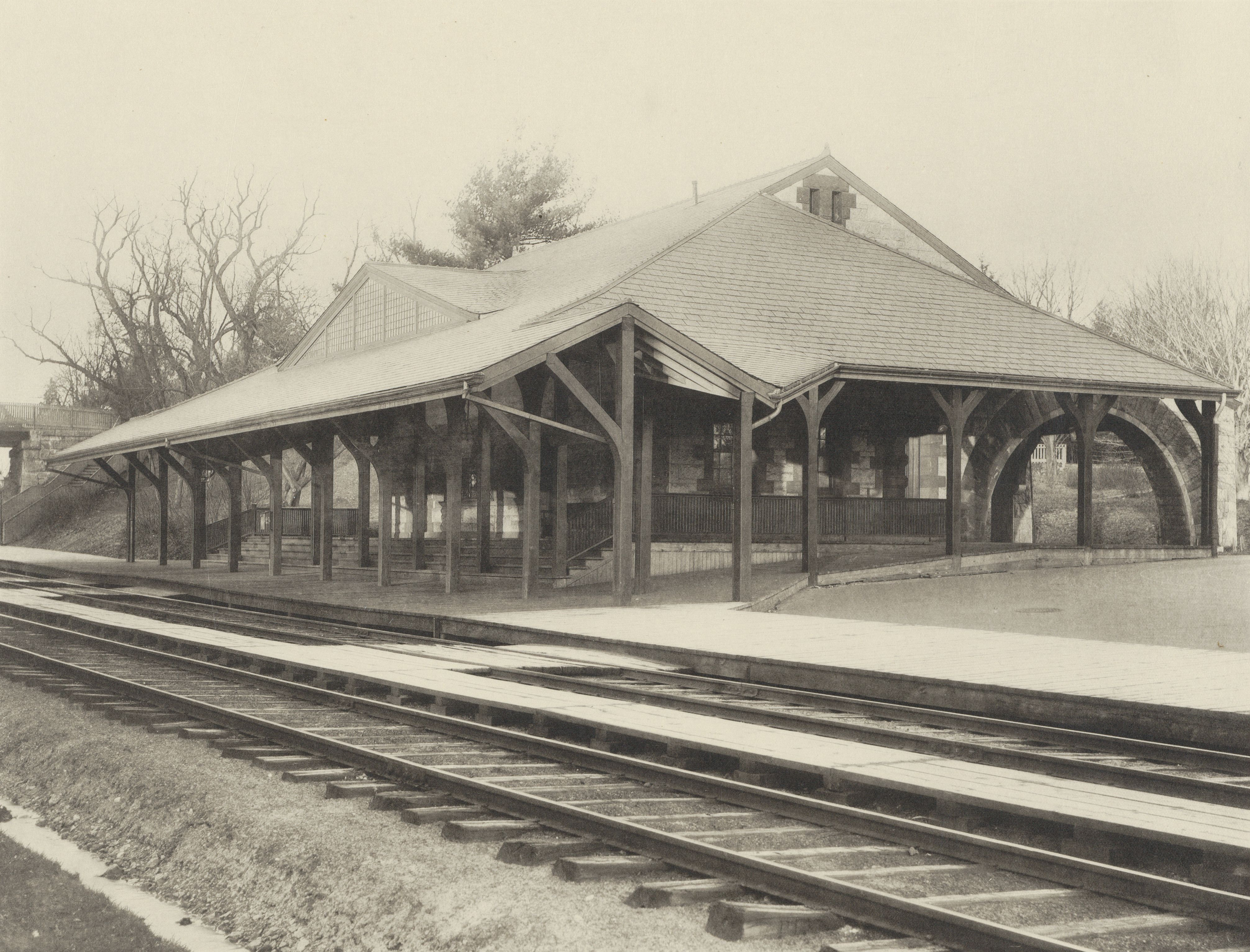
The former Chestnut Hill station prior to 1900

The Brookline Branch of the Boston and Worcester Railroad was extended west to Newton Upper Falls by the Charles River Branch Railroad in November 1852. Chestnut Hill was added as a flag stop by 1858. After 1886, loop service on the Highland branch was run via what is now the Framingham/Worcester Line and later the Needham Line.

In June 1957, the Massachusetts General Court approved the purchase of the branch by the M.T.A. from the nearly-bankrupt New York Central Railroad for conversion to a trolley line. Service ended on May 31, 1958. The line was quickly converted for trolley service, and the line including Beaconsfield station reopened on July 4, 1959. The station building was demolished and replaced by a small wooden shelter on the inbound platform. The M.T.A. was folded into the Massachusetts Bay Transportation Authority (MBTA) in August 1964.

=== Accessibility ===
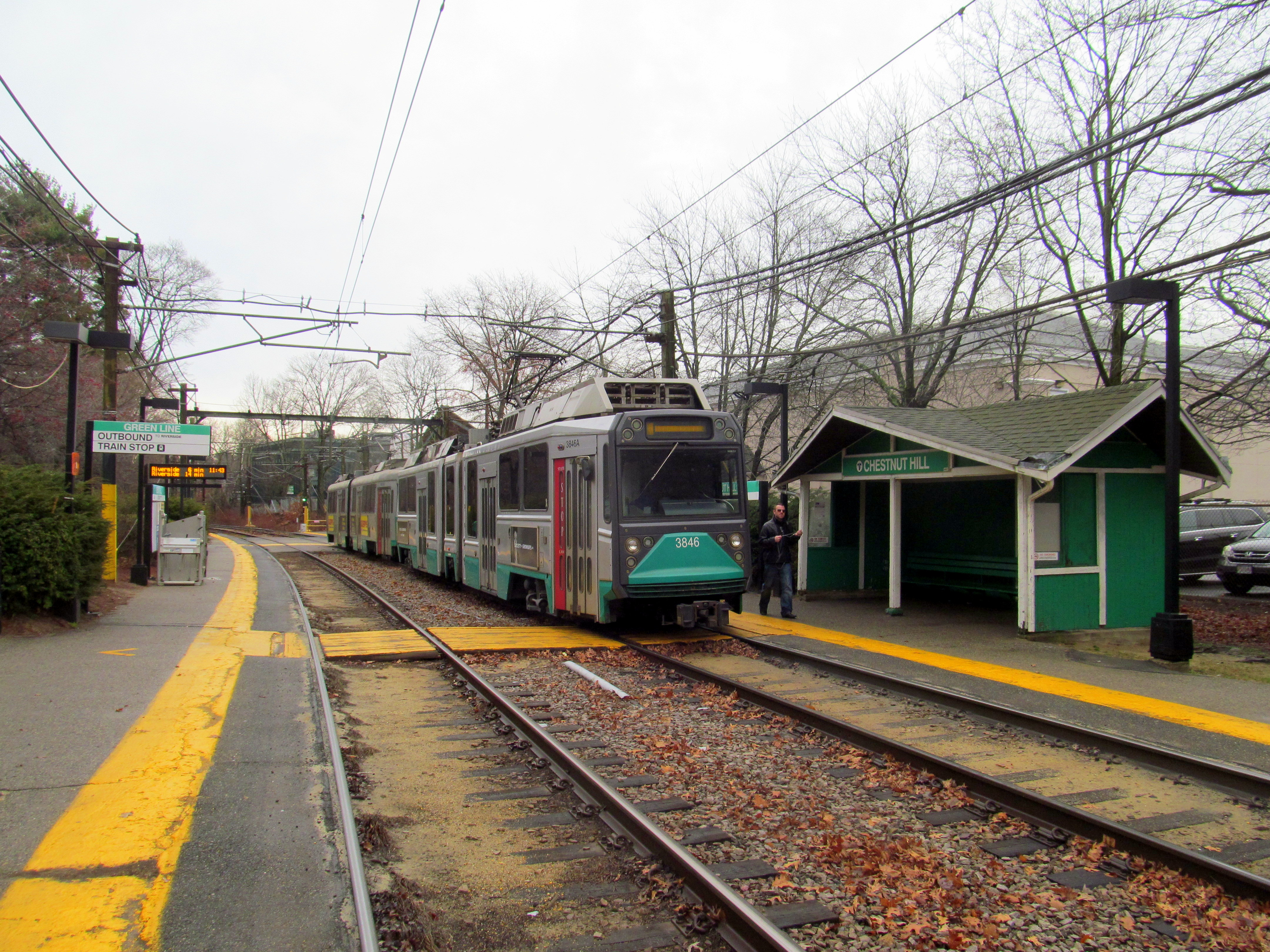
The station in 2015 prior to accessibility renovations

In 2019, the MBTA indicated that the four remaining non-accessible stops on the D branch were "Tier I" accessibility priorities. A preliminary design contract for accessibility modifications at the four stations was issued in February 2021. The station platforms will be raised and rebuilt, and a new accessible path to Hammond Road will be built. Design reached 75% in June 2022 and was completed late that year. Plans shown in March 2024 called for the platforms to be rebuilt in their existing configuration.

By November 2023, construction was expected to be advertised in early 2024 and begin midyear. However, in June 2024, the MBTA indicated that the renovations at the four stations would be done in two phases. The first phase added sections of accessible platform similar to those previously installed at Newton Highlands; some entrances were made accessible. Construction at the four stations took place primarily over the weekends of October 5–6 and 19–20, 2024, leaving them "generally accessible". By late 2024, full reconstructions were expected to take place in 2026–2027 to serve new Type 10 vehicles. As of December 2025, final design work is "pending determination of final scope".
