= Newton Centre station =

Light rail station in Newton, Massachusetts, US

Newton Centre
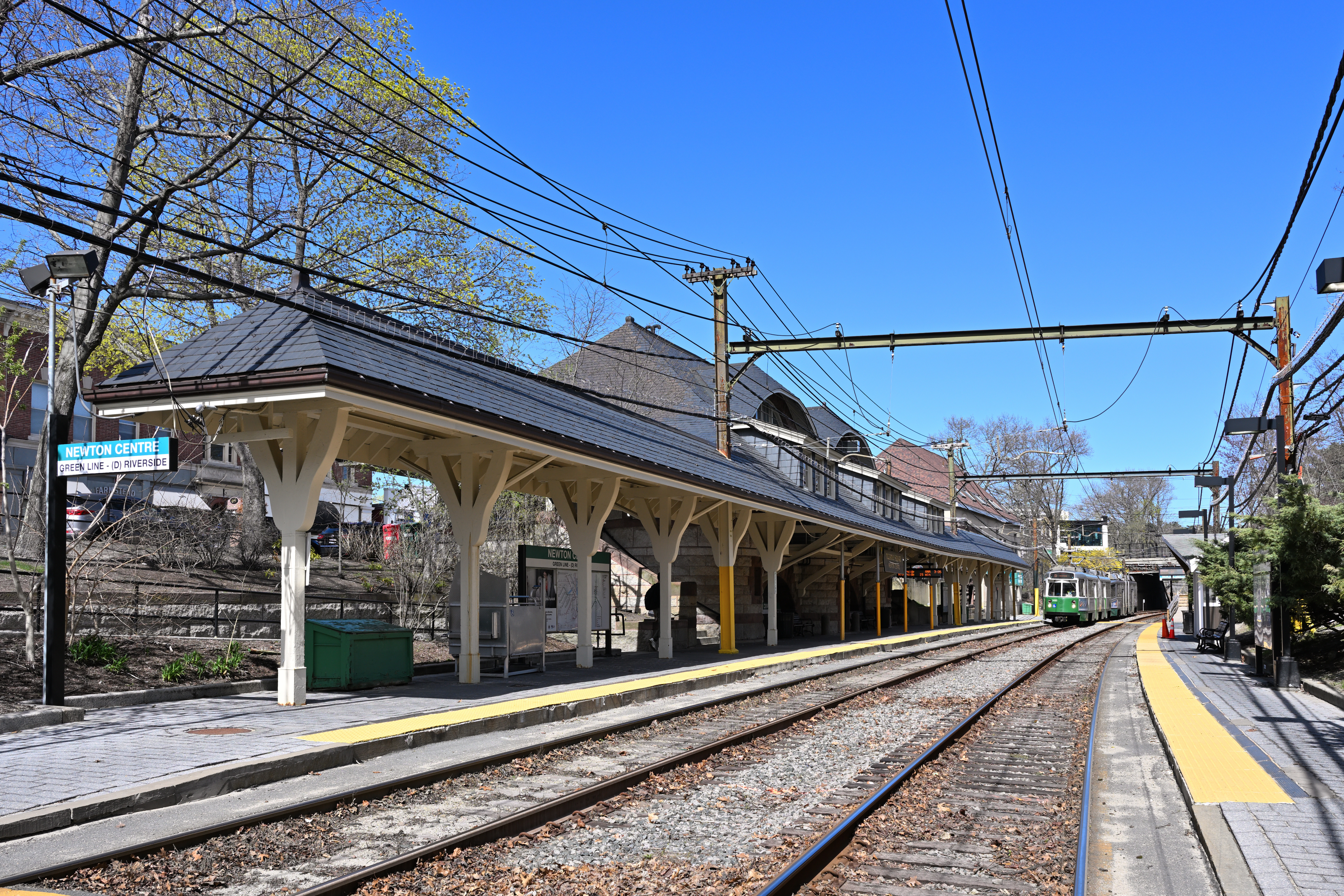
- Newton Centre station in April 2025

General information
- Location: 70 Union Street; Newton, Massachusetts
- Coordinates: 42°19′46″N 71°11′33″W
- Line: Highland branch
- Platforms: 2 side platforms
- Tracks: 2
- Connections: MBTA bus: 52

Construction
- Cycle facilities: 15 spaces
- Accessible: Yes

History
- Opened: 1852
- Rebuilt: 1891; 1958–1959; 1999
- Former names: Newton Center

Passengers
- 2013: 1,891 daily boardings

Services
Preceding station	MBTA	Following station
Newton Highlands toward Riverside	Green Line D branch	Chestnut Hill toward Union Square
Former services
Preceding station	New York Central Railroad	Following station
Newton Highlands toward Riverside	Highland branch	Chestnut Hill toward Boston
- Newton Centre Railroad Station
- U.S. Historic district – Contributing property
- Built: 1891
- Architect: Shepley, Rutan and Coolidge
- Architectural style: Richardsonian Romanesque
- Part of: Newton Railroad Stations Historic District (ID76002137)
- Designated CP: March 25, 1976
Location

Newton Centre station is a light rail station on the MBTA Green Line D branch, located in the Newton Centre village of Newton, Massachusetts. A former commuter rail station, it was converted for light rail use and reopened on July 4, 1959, along with the rest of the line. The 1891-built station and express office are part of the Newton Railroad Stations Historic District, which was placed on the National Register of Historic Places in 1976.

== History ==
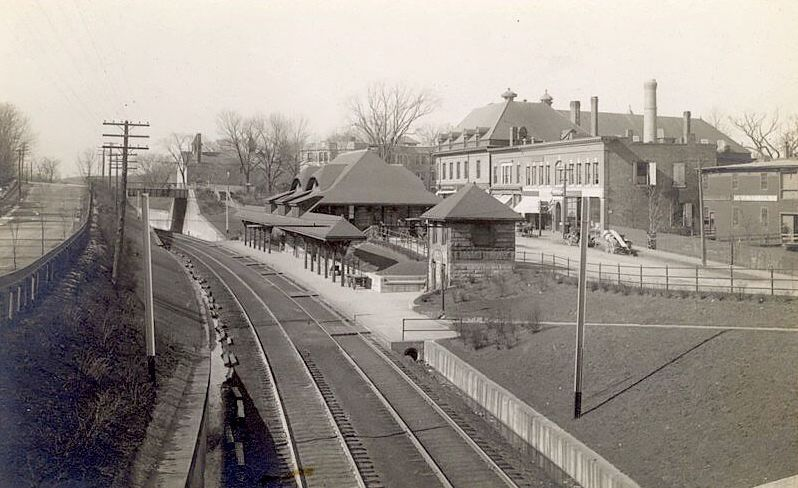
Newton Centre station, looking west, shortly after the 1907 track lowering

The first station at the site opened in 1852 on Langley Road as a part of the Charles River Railroad. The Boston and Albany Railroad commissioned a building which design was started by H. H. Richardson in 1886, the year of his death, and which design was finished by Richardson’s successor firm of Shepley, Rutan, and Coolidge. The new station, built by the Norcross Brothers firm of Worcester, opened in 1891. The station was heavily modified in 1905–1907 when the line was lowered below grade to eliminate street crossings. The Highland branch was closed in 1958 and quickly converted for streetcar use; streetcar service began in July 1959.

The station building was rented out as commercial space; by 1962, it housed a clothing store. The station building was placed on the National Register of Historic Places in 1976 as part of the Newton Railroad Stations Historic District. At that time, it housed a sales training agency. It was used as travel industry training school beginning around 1977 and a coffee shop beginning around 1988. A Coffee Connection store replaced that coffee shop in the early 1990s. It became a Starbucks store in 1994, when the chain bought out Coffee Connection, and closed in 2008. A restaurant was open in the building from 2010 to 2022.

In the late 1990s and early 2000s, the MBTA modified key surface stops with raised platforms for accessibility as part of the Light Rail Accessibility Program. The renovation of Newton Centre was completed in 1999. Around 2006, the MBTA added a wooden mini-high platform on the inbound side, allowing level boarding on older Type 7 LRVs. These platforms were installed at eight Green Line stations in 2006–2007 as part of the settlement of Joanne Daniels-Finegold, et al. v. MBTA. In October 2012, the MBTA changed the station name from Newton Center to Newton Centre to match the village name.
