= Newton Railroad Stations Historic District =

Historic district in Massachusetts, United States

- U.S. National Register of Historic Places
- U.S. Historic district
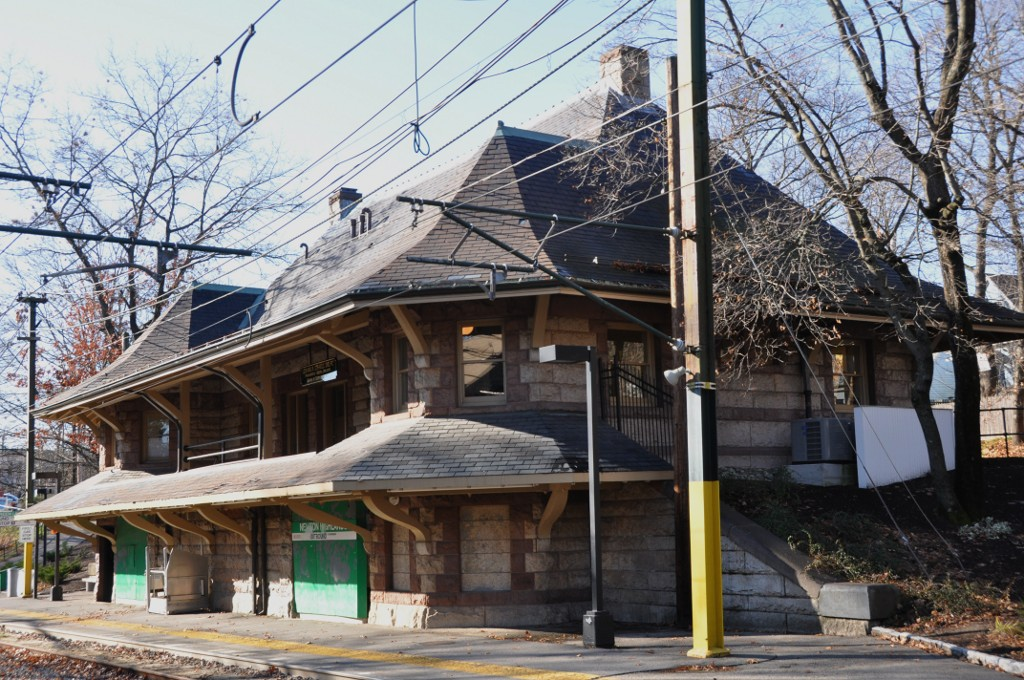
- Newton Highlands station in 2011
- Location: Newton, Massachusetts
- Built: 1886–1891
- Architect: Henry Hobson Richardson; Shepley, Rutan & Coolidge
- Architectural style: Richardsonian Romanesque
- NRHP reference No.: 76002137
- Added to NRHP: March 25, 1976

The Newton Railroad Stations Historic District in Newton, Massachusetts is composed of three geographically separate historic railroad stations and one baggage/express building on the former Boston and Albany Railroad Highland branch, which was converted to MBTA Green Line D branch in 1959.

The four buildings in Newton are the only extant stations of thirteen designed by H.H. Richardson and his successors Shepley, Rutan, and Coolidge in Allston/Brighton, Newton, and Brookline for the Boston and Albany's Newton Circuit between 1881 and 1894. Most originally had their grounds designed by landscape architect Frederick Law Olmsted, but none of the landscaping has survived.

On March 25, 1976, the district was added to the National Register of Historic Places as the Woodland, Newton Highlands, and Newton Centre Railroad Stations, and Baggage and Express Building.

== Structures ==
The District consists of four structures:

- Woodland Railroad Station: Designed by Richardson (likely with significant input from Shepley, Rutan, and Coolidge); constructed in 1886. Now used for storage for an adjacent golf course; the modern station is some distance away.
- Newton Highlands Railroad Station: Designed by Shepley, Rutan, and Coolidge; constructed in 1887. Now houses a private business, with eaves providing shelter for the modern station.
- Newton Centre Railroad Station: Designed by Shepley, Rutan, and Coolidge; constructed in 1891. Now houses a restaurant, with eaves and canopy providing shelter for the modern station.
- Baggage and Express Building: constructed next to Newton Centre Railroad Station in 1891. Part of the structure has been demolished; the remaining portion has been integrated into a private business building.

== See also ==
- National Register of Historic Places listings in Newton, Massachusetts
