= Reservoir station =

Reservoir station could refer to:

- Reservoir railway station in Reservoir, Victoria
- Reservoir station (MBTA) in Brookline, Massachusetts
