= Newton Highlands station =

Light rail station in Newton, Massachusetts, US

Newton Highlands
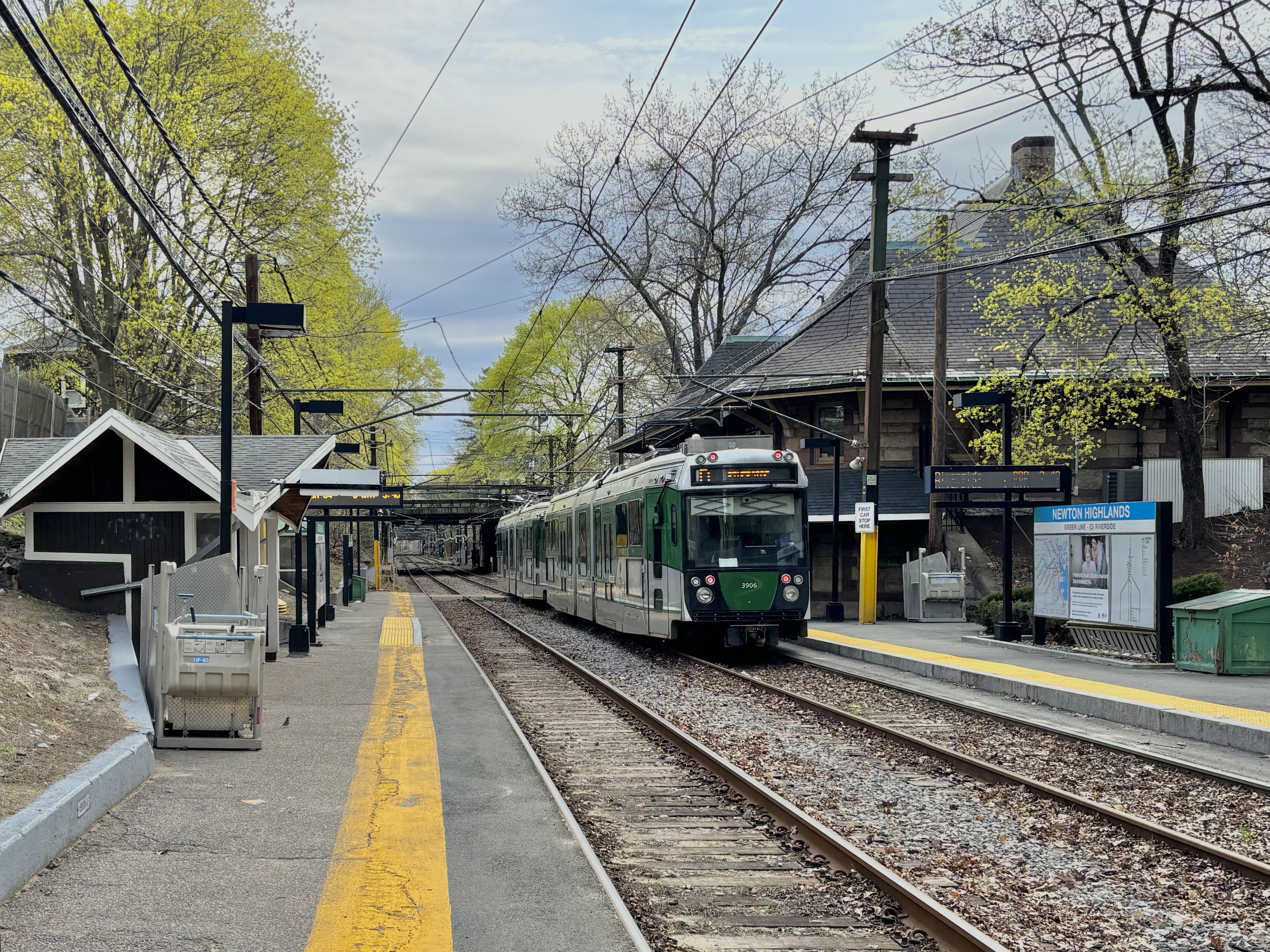
- An outbound train leaving Newton Highlands station in 2025

General information
- Location: 1170 Walnut Street; Newton Highlands, Newton, Massachusetts
- Coordinates: 42.3225°N 71.2054°W
- Line: Highland branch
- Platforms: 2 side platforms
- Tracks: 2
- Connections: MBTA bus: 59; 128 Business Council: N1

Construction
- Accessible: Yes

History
- Opened: 1852 (original station); July 4, 1959 (light rail station)
- Closed: 1958
- Rebuilt: 2019–2020; more work planned

Passengers
- 2011: 1,627 daily boardings

Services
Preceding station	MBTA	Following station
Eliot toward Riverside	Green Line D branch	Newton Centre toward Union Square
Former services
Preceding station	New York Central Railroad	Following station
Eliot toward Riverside	Highland branch	Newton Centre toward Boston
- Newton Highlands Railroad Station
- U.S. Historic district – Contributing property
- Architect: Shepley, Rutan and Coolidge
- Architectural style: Richardsonian Romanesque
- Part of: Newton Railroad Stations Historic District (ID76002137)
- Designated CP: March 25, 1976
Location

Newton Highlands station is a surface-level light rail station located in Newton, Massachusetts on the Green Line D branch of the Massachusetts Bay Transportation Authority.

== History ==
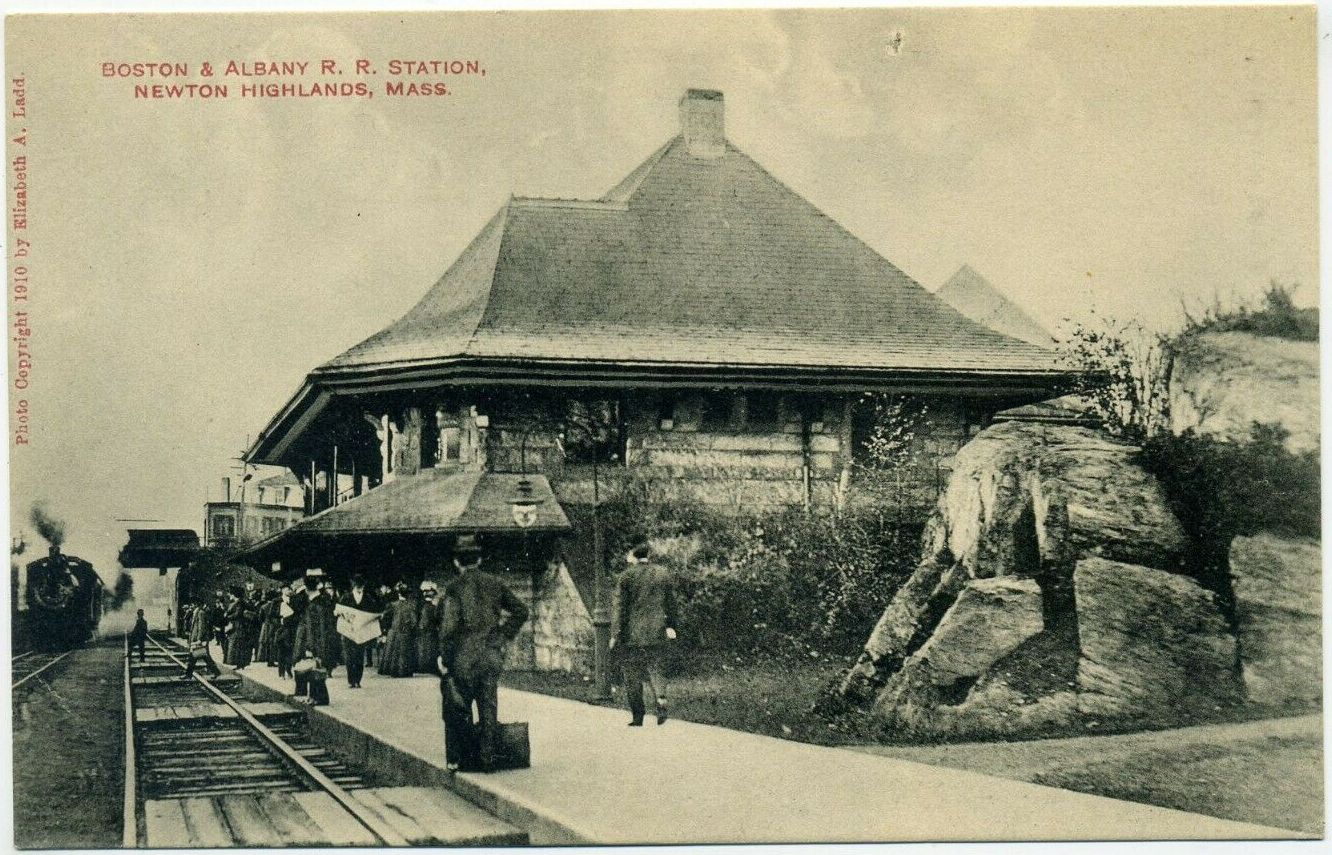
Early-20th-century postcard of the station

The Brookline Branch of the Boston and Worcester Railroad was extended west to Newton Upper Falls by the Charles River Branch Railroad in November 1852. A flag stop was located at Oak Hill (later Newton Highlands). The Boston and Albany Railroad depot was designed by H. H. Richardson in collaboration with landscape architect Frederick Law Olmsted, and was completed in June 1887 shortly after Richardson's death. It was listed on the National Register of Historic Places on June 3, 1976, and is part of the Newton Railroad Stations Historic District. Commuter rail service on the line ended in 1958; it reopened as a light rail station on July 4, 1959.

The station's interior, occupied by an auto parts store for years, is being renovated and is partially occupied by a periodontist's office. It is not used as a passenger waiting area, although the building's eaves provide some shelter for outbound passengers.

=== Renovations ===
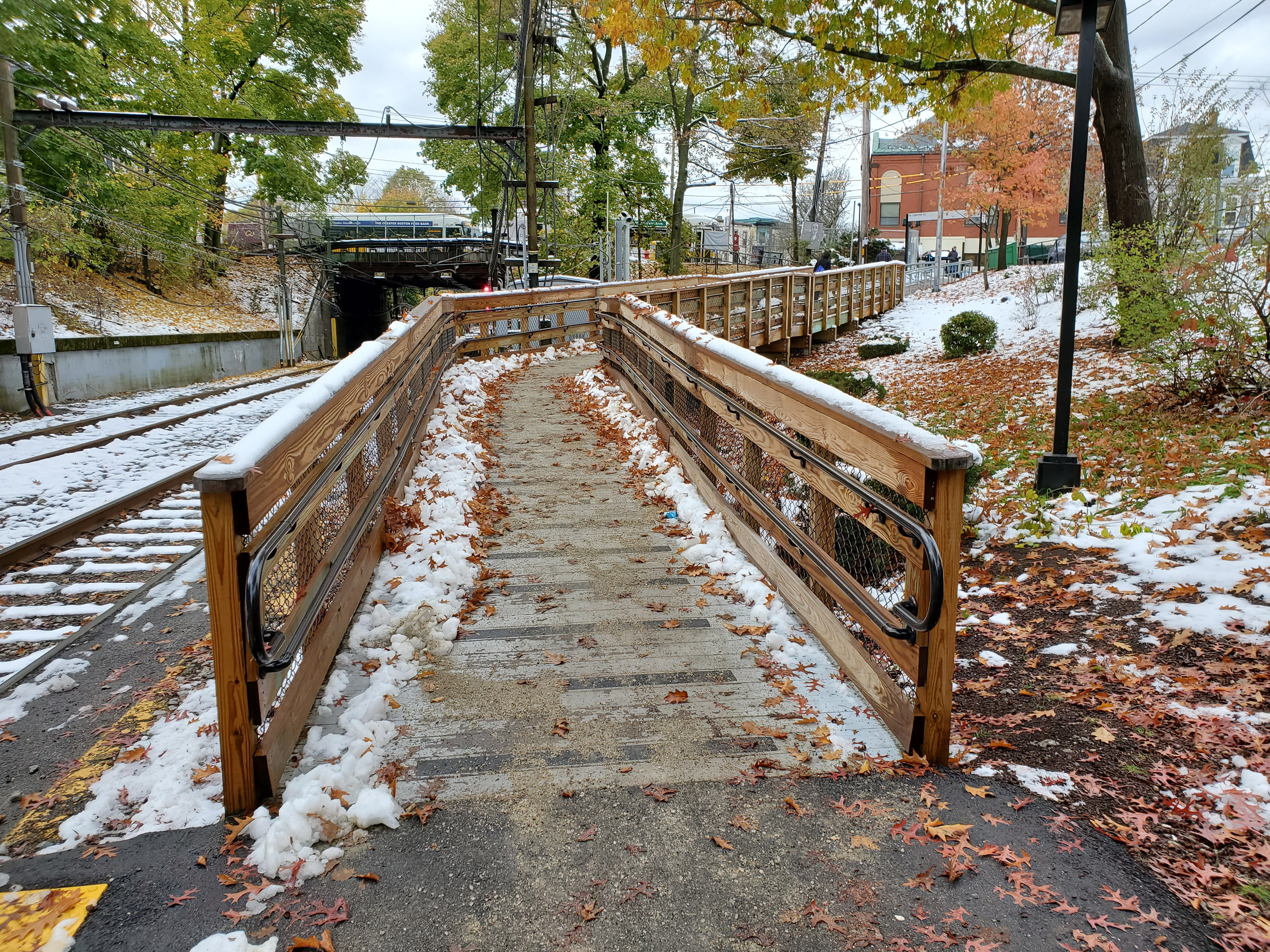
Temporary ramp at the station in 2020

Newton Highlands station has three entrances – ramps from Walnut Street and Station Avenue, and stairs from Hyde Street – all to the outbound platform. Passengers must cross the tracks to reach the inbound platform. The station formerly had low platforms and the ramps were steeper than regulations allow, making the station not fully accessible; however, portable lifts were present to provide partial accessibility.

Design for a fully accessible renovation reached 30% in October 2015. The project will make the two existing ramps accessible, add an accessible ramp from Hyde Street to the inbound platform, and raise the platforms. In 2019–20, a temporary accessible ramp and platform sections were built to make the station accessible while it was used as a terminal during track work on the line. By December 2022, design was to completed that month; the project was expected to be advertised for bidding in early 2023, with construction beginning after midyear. Design was not completed until 2023; by November 2023, the project was expected to be bid in early 2024 with construction beginning that fall.

Construction planning indicated that the project would require part of the line to be shut down for several dozen weekends, which would have been infeasible. As of December 2025, the MBTA plans to install additional crossovers on the line in 2027 to allow for single-track operations. Construction at Newton Highlands would not begin until that project is completed. Reconstruction of Newton Highlands is expected to cost $30 million.
