= Reservoir station (MBTA) =

Light rail station in Brookline, Massachusetts, US

Reservoir
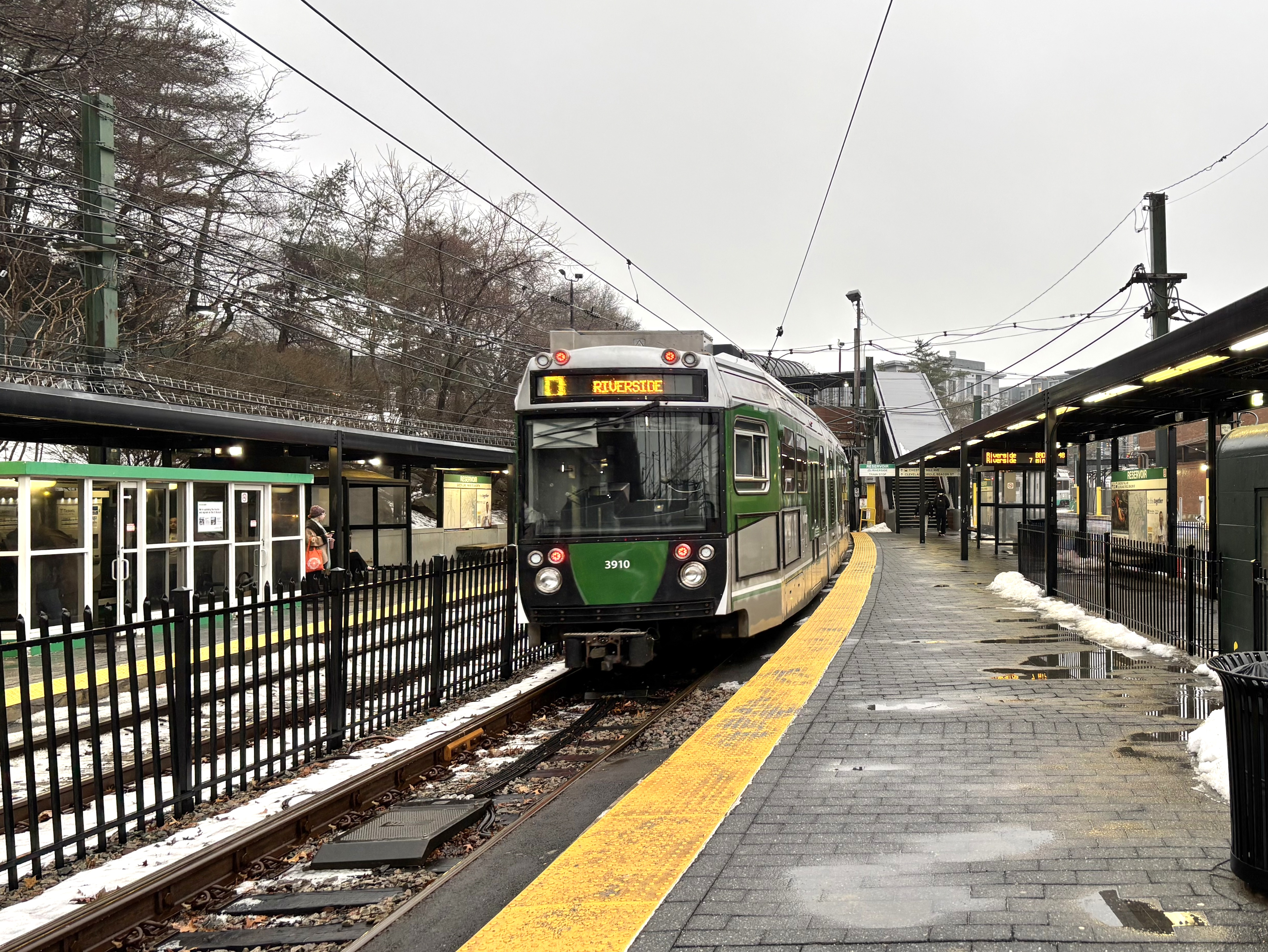
- An outbound train at Reservoir station in 2025

General information
- Location: 401 Chestnut Hill Avenue; Brookline, Massachusetts
- Coordinates: 42.33518°N 71.14827°W
- Line: Highland branch
- Platforms: 4 side platforms (2 in regular service)
- Tracks: 4 (2 in regular service)
- Connections: MBTA bus: 51, 86

Construction
- Cycle facilities: 8 spaces
- Accessible: Yes

History
- Opened: November 1852 (commuter rail); July 4, 1959 (light rail)
- Closed: May 31, 1958 (commuter rail)
- Rebuilt: 1980s; 1999

Passengers
- 2011: 3,404 daily boardings

Services
Preceding station	MBTA	Following station
Chestnut Hill toward Riverside	Green Line D branch	Beaconsfield toward Union Square
Former services
Preceding station	New York Central Railroad	Following station
Chestnut Hill toward Riverside	Highland branch	Beaconsfield toward Boston
Location

Reservoir station is a light rail station on the MBTA Green Line D branch, located in Brookline, Massachusetts, adjacent to the Cleveland Circle area of Brighton. The station is adjacent to Reservoir Yard and Carhouse, with the Cleveland Circle terminus of the C branch just a block away. With a daily ridership of 3,395, Reservoir is the second-busiest surface stop on the D branch (after Fenway). Reservoir station is accessible, with raised platforms to accommodate low-floor trams. MBTA bus routes 51 and 86 terminate at the Reservoir busway off Chestnut Hill Avenue.

== History ==
=== Railroad station ===
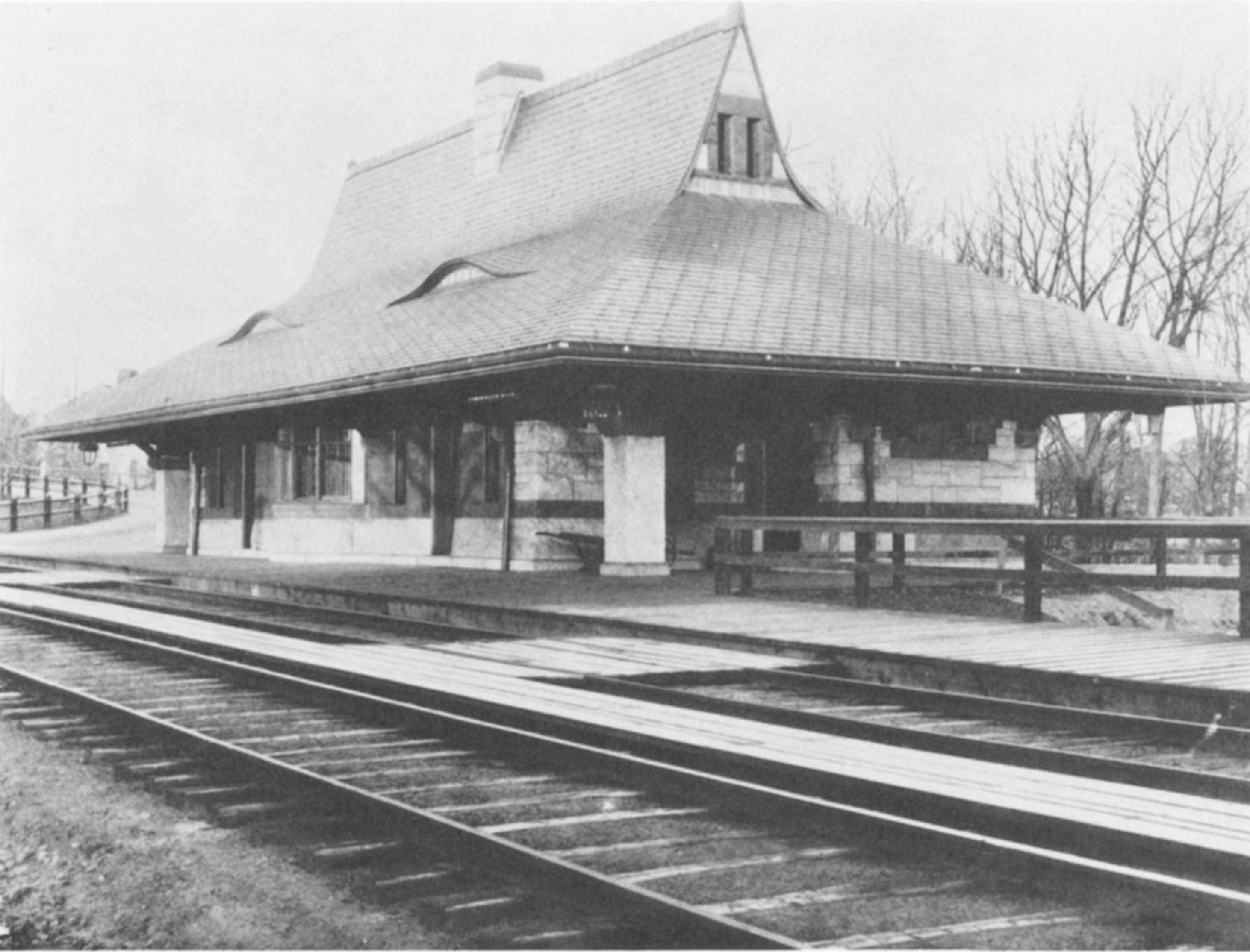
The 1888-built Reservoir station

Brighton Street opened as a commuter rail station on the Charles River Branch Railroad (by then merged into the Charles River Railroad) in November 1852. The station was located on the north side of the tracks east of Brighton Street (later Chestnut Hill Avenue). The station was moved west of Chestnut Hill Avenue and renamed Reservoir around the time the Chestnut Hill Reservoir opened in 1870.

In 1883, the Boston and Albany Railroad bought the line between Brookline Junction and Cook Junction and extended it to Reservoir as its Highland branch, running Newton Circuit service beginning in 1886. A Richardsonian Romanesque station building, designed by Shepley, Rutan and Coolidge, opened in 1888 near the original station location. The station agent was removed in May 1949, but the station building remained in use as shelter for passengers.

=== Light rail station ===
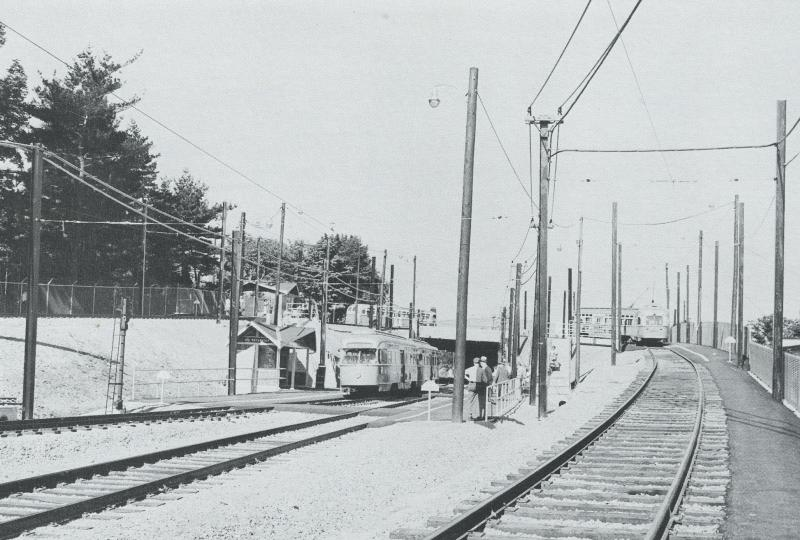
Reservoir station around 1961, showing the overhead short-turn loop

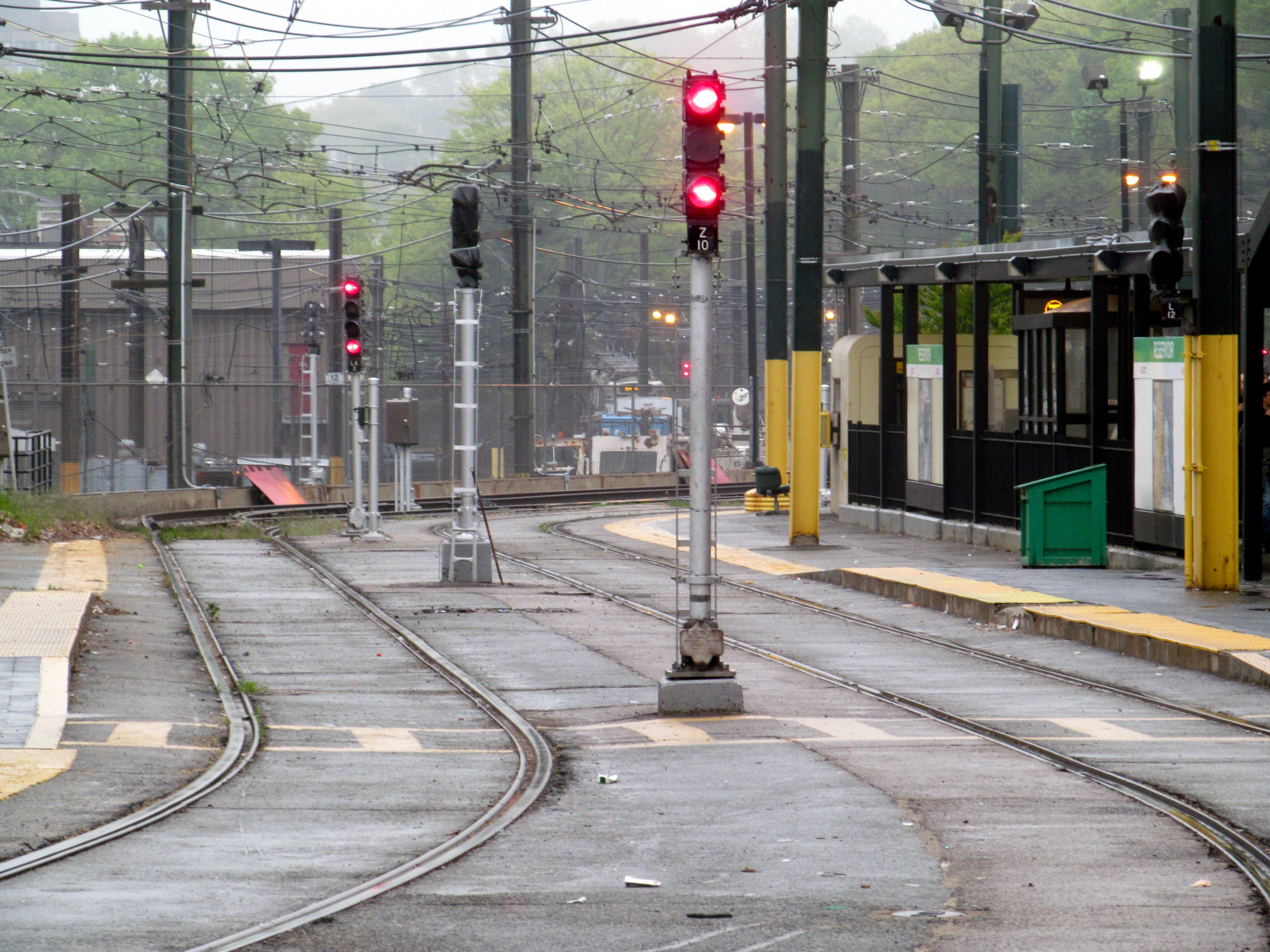
Platforms on the spur to Chestnut Hill Avenue

On May 31, 1958, the line was closed for rebuilding; it reopened on July 4, 1959 as a branch of the M.T.A. streetcar system. The 1888 station building was removed to make space for the new station and connecting yard tracks. When the line was converted for light rail use, it was assumed that most traffic would come from the inner part of the line, and thus an overhead loop was built connecting the line to Chestnut Hill Avenue. However, the outer half of the line proved more popular than expected, and Reservoir short turns were later reduced, with some extra short turn service remaining at times during rush hour.

In 1974, the MBTA began rebuilding the line to accommodate the new Boeing LRVs. From June 8 to September 11, Highland branch cars ran on Beacon Street from Reservoir to Kenmore. A temporary inbound-to-outbound turning loop was built east of Reservoir for the diversion. Inbound cars stopped at Reservoir, ran around the temporary loop, and up the outbound side of the regular loop towards Cleveland Circle. Outbound cars via Beacon Street ran down the inbound side of the regular loop, around the same temporary loop track, and then continued outbound from the station.

The regular short-turn loop was closed in August 1980 as part of the closure of the old Reservoir Carhouse, which had been built in 1889 when the Beacon Street line opened. The old carhouse closed on June 25, 1982; a new building opened the next year.

The regular station, located below grade, has two side platforms serving the line's 2 tracks. A two-track spur with two side platforms of its own runs north of the main station and connects with the non-revenue tracks on Chestnut Hill Avenue. This spur, built after the loop removal in 1980, is sometimes used to detrain passengers from cars short-turning at Reservoir so as not to block the main tracks. A sidewalk ramp runs alongside the spur line, serving as an accessible route to the station platforms from the north.

In the late 1990s and early 2000s, the MBTA modified key surface stops with raised platforms for accessibility as part of the Light Rail Accessibility Program. The renovation of Reservoir was completed in 1999.
