= Green Line D branch =

Light rail line in Massachusetts, US

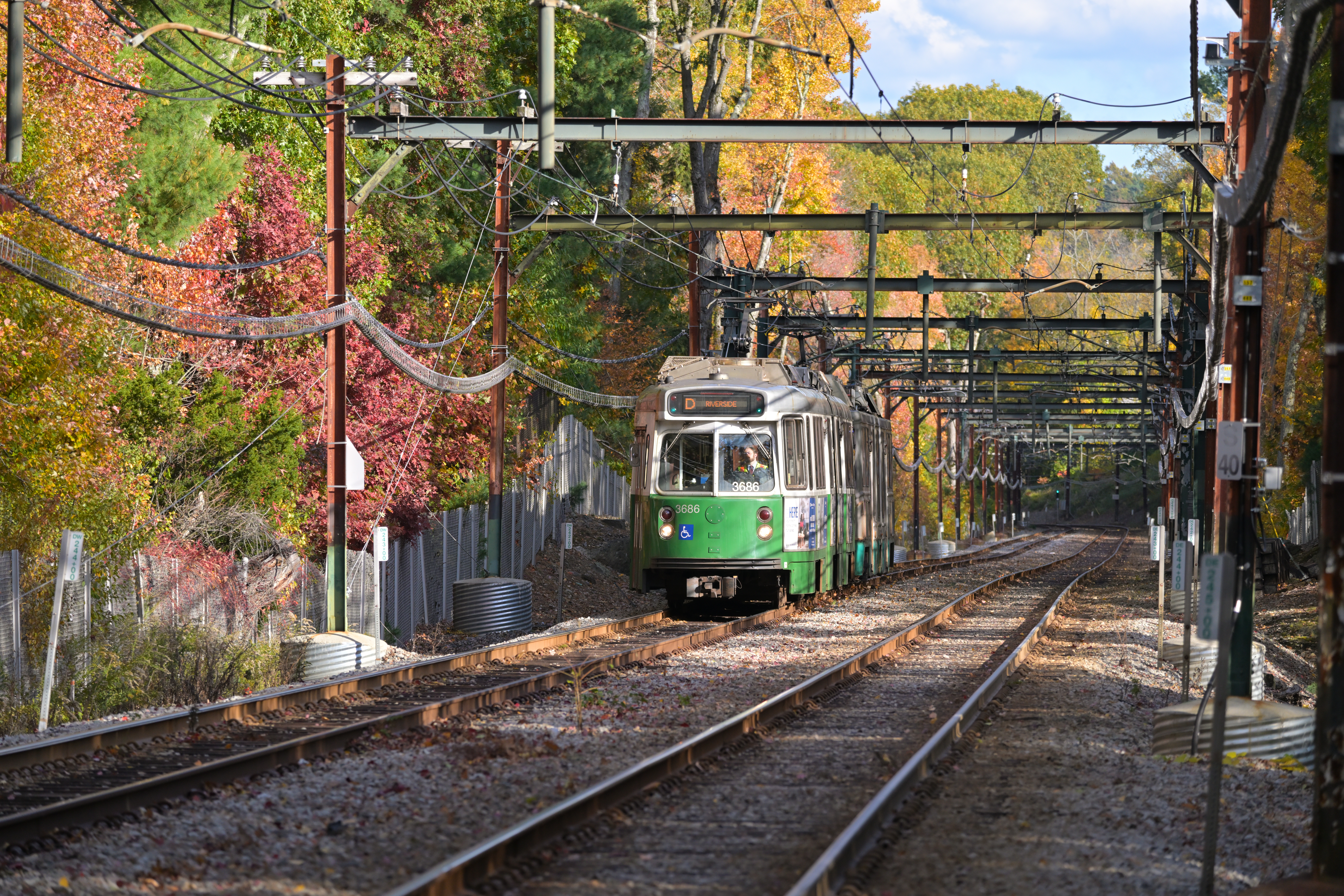
- An outbound train between Chestnut Hill and Newton Centre

Overview
- Locale: Boston, Brookline, Cambridge, Newton, and Somerville, Massachusetts
- Termini: Union Square; Riverside
- Stations: 25

Service
- Type: Light rail
- System: Green Line (MBTA subway)
- Daily ridership: 24,632 (surface boardings, 2011)

History
- Opened: July 4, 1959

Technical
- Num of tracks: 2
- Character: Grade-separated, partially underground
- Track gauge: 4 ft 8 1/2 in (1,435 mm) standard gauge
- Electrification: Overhead line, 600 V DC

The Green Line D branch (also referred to as the Highland branch or Riverside Line) is a light rail line in Boston, Brookline, Cambridge, Newton, and Somerville, Massachusetts, operating as part of the Massachusetts Bay Transportation Authority (MBTA) Green Line. The line runs on a grade separated surface right-of-way for 9 miles (14 km) from Riverside station to Fenway station. The line merges into the C branch tunnel west of Kenmore, then follows the Boylston Street subway and Tremont Street subway to North Station. It is the longest and busiest of the four Green Line branches. As of June 2024, service operates on 6 to 8-minute headways at weekday peak hours and 7 to 13-minute headways at other times, using 13 to 19 trains (26 to 38 light rail vehicles).

Unlike the other three Green Line branches, the D branch did not originate as a streetcar line running on city streets. The Boston and Albany Railroad Highland branch, built in segments from 1848 to 1886, operated as a commuter rail line until its 1958 closure. It was converted to a streetcar rapid transit line by the Metropolitan Transportation Authority and reopened on July 4, 1959. Ownership passed to the MBTA in 1964; Tremont Street subway service was designated as the Green Line in 1965, with the Riverside Line becoming the D branch in 1967.

The line was substantially rebuilt in the mid-1970s, in 2007, and in 2018–2020. The downtown terminal was shifted between Park Street, Government Center, North Station, and Lechmere a number of times; it was extended to Union Square in September 2022 as part of the Green Line Extension project. All of the line's thirteen surface stations were rebuilt for accessibility between 2001 and 2024.

== History ==
=== Commuter rail ===
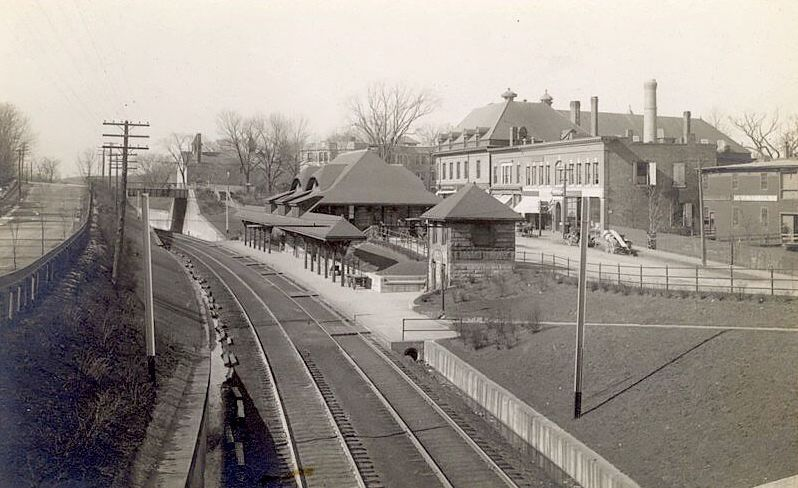
Newton Center station around 1910

What is now the surface section of the D branch was formerly the Highland branch of the Boston and Albany Railroad (B&A). The portion between Brookline Junction and Brookline Village was built by B&A predecessor Boston and Worcester Railroad in 1848. The Charles River Branch Railroad extended the line to Newton Upper Falls in 1852, and later to Woonsocket, Rhode Island. The B&A purchased the line between Brookline Village and Cook Street (in Newton Highlands) from the New York and New England Railroad (NY&NE) in 1883. A short extension from Cook Street to Riverside on the B&A mainline opened in 1886. The B&A instituted bidirectional "Newton Circuit" loop service via the Highland branch and mainline, while the NY&NE continued to use the branch east of Cook Street. NY&NE successor New York, New Haven and Hartford Railroad began routing most NY&NE trains over a new cutoff from Needham Junction to West Roxbury in 1906. The remaining grade crossings on the line were eliminated in 1905–07. Passenger service on the 1852-built line south of Cook Street ended in 1927. (A portion in Needham remains in use as part of the Needham Line). Passenger service on the line ended on May 31, 1958.

=== Conversion to light rail ===
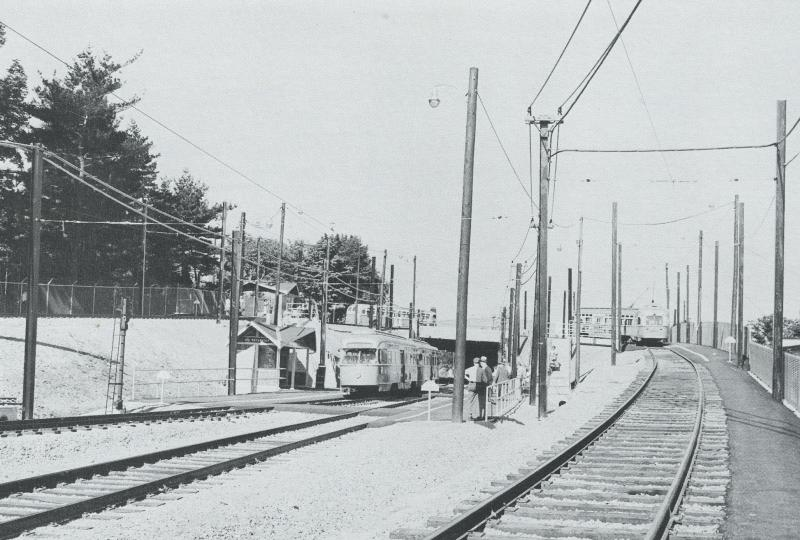
The new Reservoir station around 1961

Conversion of the Highland branch to a third-rail rapid transit line was proposed in 1913. That proposal called for trains to reach downtown Boston using the then-under-construction Boylston Street subway, which was built for streetcars but sized for rapid transit conversion, with a connection near Governor Square. In May 1924, the state legislature directed the Metropolitan District Commission to plan an expanded rapid transit system in Boston. The plan, released in 1926, called for the existing streetcar subway to be converted into two rapid transit lines. A number of potential future extensions were listed; among them was conversion of most of the Highland branch to rapid transit, linking with a Huntington Avenue subway at Brookline Village.

In 1943, the state legislature appointed a commission headed by Arthur W. Coolidge to plan for the future of transit in the Boston region. In 1945, a preliminary report from the Coolidge Commission recommended nine suburban rapid transit extensions – most similar to the 1926 plan – along existing railroad lines. The Highland branch was to be converted to a rapid transit line, using low-floor trains that could operate in the existing streetcar subway. A branch would use the former Charles River Branch Railroad route to Needham Junction. Separately, two tracks of the B&A mainline would be converted to rapid transit, also terminating at Riverside. The final report in 1947 did not recommend any changes to the Highland branch route, though it recommended extending the Needham Junction spur to Bird's Hill. Cost was estimated at $1.544 million in 1941 dollars (equivalent to $26 million in 2025) for the Riverside route, plus $424,000 (equivalent to $7 million in 2025) for the Needham spur.

On June 20, 1957, the state legislature authorized the Metropolitan Transit Authority (MTA) to acquire the Highland branch and convert it to rapid transit at a cost not to exceed $9.2 million (equivalent to $81 million in 2025). The project was approved by the MTA Advisory Board on October 1, 1957, and the state Department of Public Utilities on December 6. The Interstate Commerce Commission gave a certificate of abandonment early in 1958. The B&A ran its last passenger trains on the branch on May 31, 1958. On June 9, the $7.0 million main construction contract (equivalent to $60 million in 2025) was awarded to the Perini Corporation. The MTA acquired the line from the B&A at a cost of $600,000 (equivalent to $5 million in 2025) on June 24.

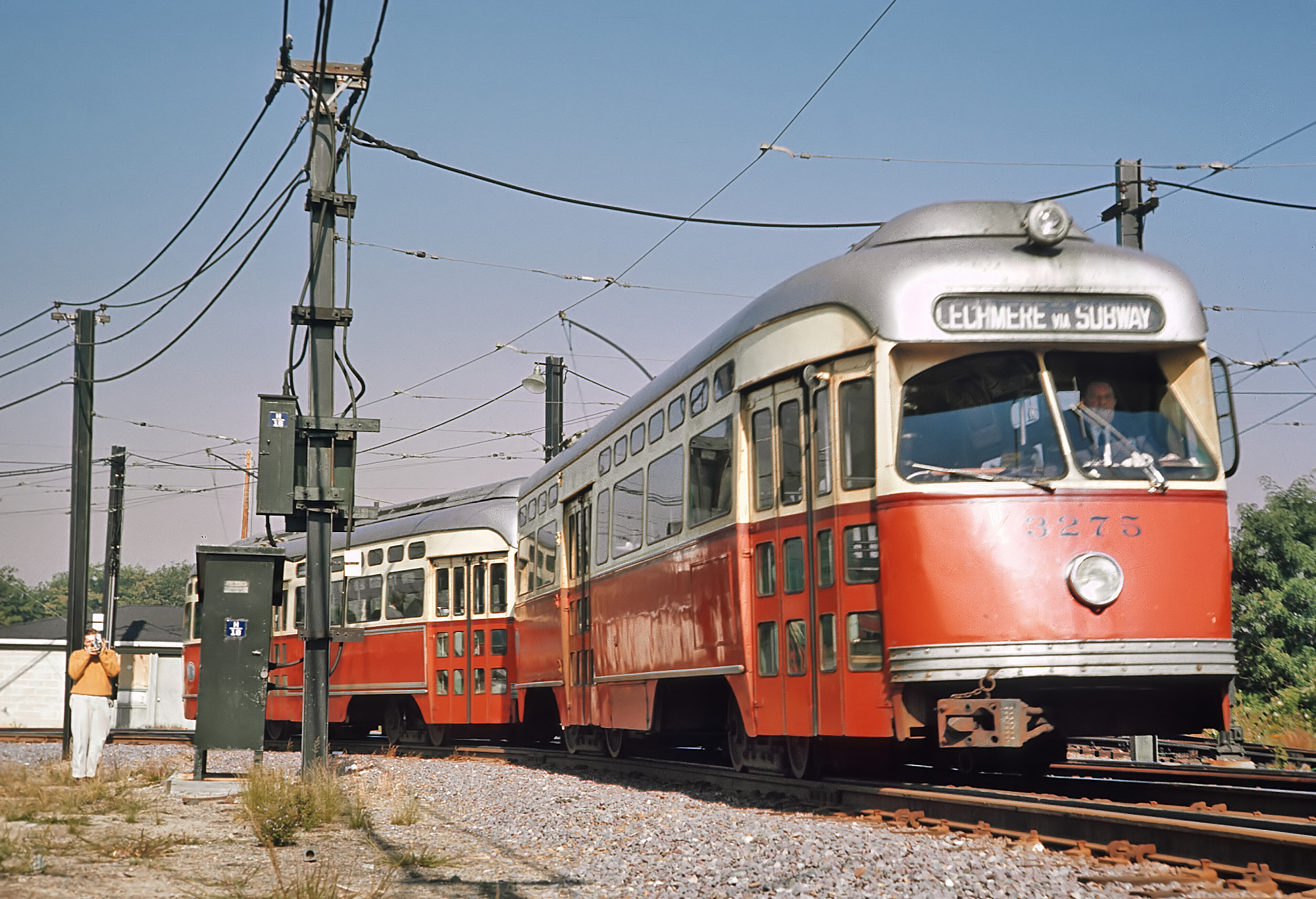
A train leaving Riverside in 1965

Work began with a groundbreaking ceremony on July 10, 1958. The work was done at relatively low cost by reusing the railroad infrastructure, including bridges and tracks; the only new right-of-way was a 1,100-foot (340 m) tunnel connecting Fenway station with the existing Beacon Street Line subway. Using trains of streetcars represented a substantial savings versus using third-rail rapid transit trains, which would have required significant work in the existing subway. Ten of the twelve existing station sites on the line were reused for new stations; two others, Riverside and Woodland, were relocated. An additional station, Fenway Park, was added at Park Drive. Small wooden shelters and new platforms were built at the stations; a larger brick waiting room was built at Riverside. All but three of the old station buildings were demolished for parking lots. These lots included a 1,960-space lot at Riverside, a 350-space lot at Woodland, and smaller lots at six other stations.

A storage yard was built at Riverside, and a connection with the existing Reservoir Carhouse of the Beacon Street Line was made at Reservoir station. An overhead loop for short turns was also built at Reservoir. The line was electrified with 600 V DC overhead lines; a new substation was built at Cook Street to power the Riverside–Reservoir section, while the inner section was fed by existing substations. Three-aspect color light block signals, similar to those already used in the subway, were added. They were spaced to allow four-minute headways west of Reservoir and two-minute headways to the east. Train testing began on June 11, 1959.

Streetcar operation began on the Highland branch on July 4, 1959. Trains operated with one to three PCC streetcars. By the end of 1959, the line carried 26,000 daily riders, versus 3,140 before conversion. Initial plans called for every other train to short turn at Reservoir. However, the outer section of the line had higher ridership than expected, and soon all trains operated to Riverside. The yard at Riverside was expanded between June 1960 and January 12, 1961, with additional storage tracks and maintenance facilities to meet the additional demand. The signals were also adjusted to allow for two-minute headways on the whole line. Initial fares were 20 cents for all rides –substantially lower than the previous B&A fares. This was adjusted in 1961 as part of a systemwide fare change, with 40-cent fares west of Reservoir and 30-cent fares at Reservoir through Longwood. Riverside service initially ran to Park Street; it was extended to Lechmere (except on Sundays) on November 20, 1961.

=== The MBTA takeover ===
The Massachusetts Bay Transportation Authority (MBTA) replaced the MTA in August 1964. The streetcar routes entering the Central Subway were designed as the Green Line on August 26, 1965. Sunday service was extended to Lechmere on September 10, 1966. In 1967, the five remaining Green Line branches were given letter designations; the Riverside Line became the D branch.

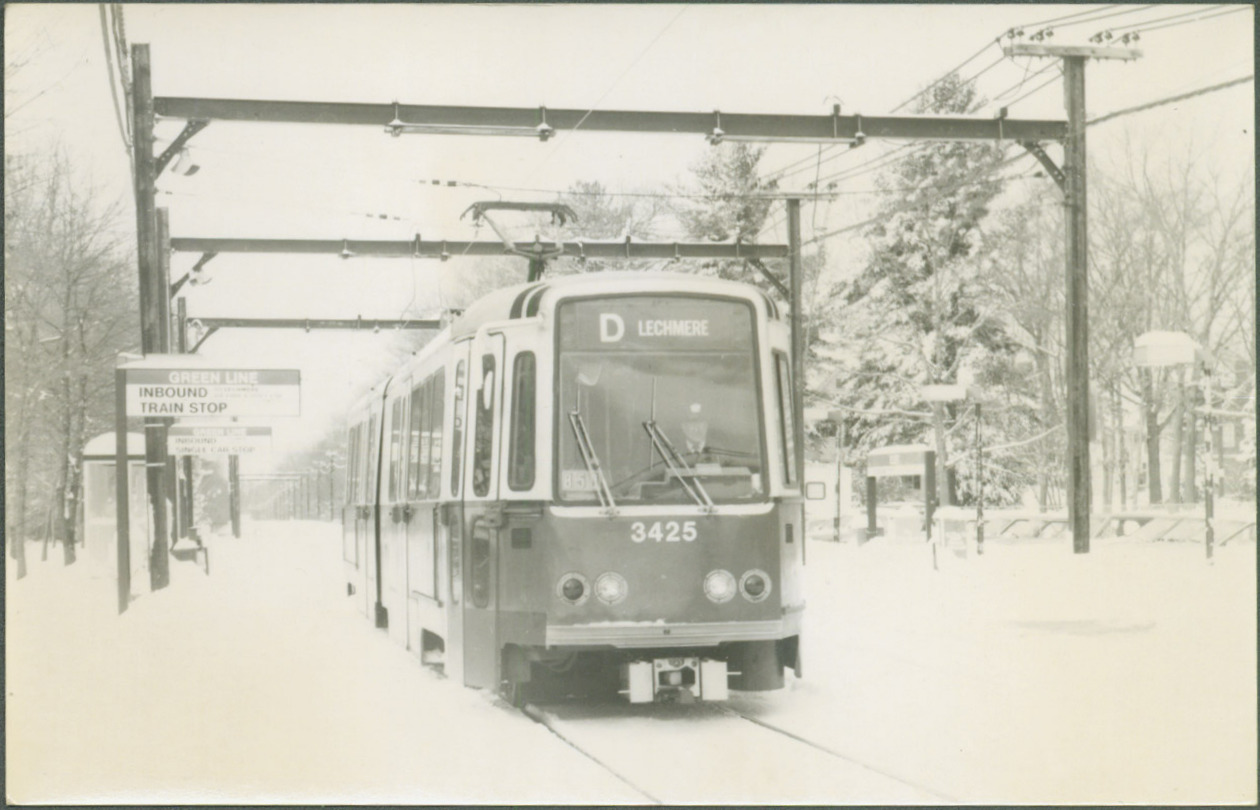
A train of Boeing LRVs at Eliot station in 1984

The tracks were rebuilt in the mid-1970s to prepare for the new Boeing light rail vehicles. From September 8 to December 28, 1973, buses replaced streetcars between Newton Highlands and Riverside. A temporary loop was built at Cook Junction to turn the single-ended PCC streetcars. (The loop rails were later reused by the Seashore Trolley Museum.) From June 8 to September 11, 1974, buses ran between Kenmore and Reservoir while the inner portion of the line was reconstructed. A temporary loop was used near Reservoir station, allowing D branch trains to use the C branch between Reservoir and Kenmore. (On March 5, 1974, the downtown terminal had been cut back from Lechmere to North Station to accommodate the longer running times associated with this rerouting.) From September 28, 1974 to September 20, 1975, single-tracking took place between Cook Junction and Reservoir. Station platforms were also rebuilt during these shutdowns. A new maintenance facility at Riverside was opened on July 12, 1976, to serve the new LRV fleet.

The MBTA's first LRVs operated on the D branch on December 30, 1976. The downtown terminal was changed several times in 1976–77; PCCs and LRVs sometimes used different terminals (as LRVs could use stub-end tracks, while PCCs required a loop). On December 15, 1977, all D branch trains running with LRVs began using the newly rebuilt Canal Street surface terminal at North Station; the small number of PCCs continued to loop at Government Center. Regular use of PCC cars on the D branch ended March 23, 1978, though later LRV shortages prompted the occasional return of PCC streetcars. The downtown terminal was again changed several times from 1980 to 1984; after January 20, 1984, D branch trains terminated at Government Center at rush hours and Lechmere at other times. Rush hour service was cut back to Government Center on June 20, 1987.

Riverside station on the D branch is located about 1/3 mile (1/2 km) southeast of the station on the mainline, which saw commuter rail service until 1977. The tracks between the two stations were largely disused by the 1960s, though they were used for LRV deliveries in the 1970s. On October 20, 1996, flooding from the Muddy River inundated the Green Line subway. D branch trains only ran between Riverside and Brookline Village until October 27, when they were extended to Park Street. Special commuter rail shuttle trains also ran between South Station and a temporary platform near the Riverside light rail station from October 23–25 to supplement Green Line service. Weekend D branch service was extended to Lechmere on March 28, 1997; weekday service followed on June 21. It was cut back to Government Center on June 19, 2004, to accommodate the demolition of the Causeway Street elevated and the opening of the new underground North Station. Green Line service to Lechmere resumed on November 12, 2005, though the D branch continued to terminate at Government Center.

=== 21st century ===
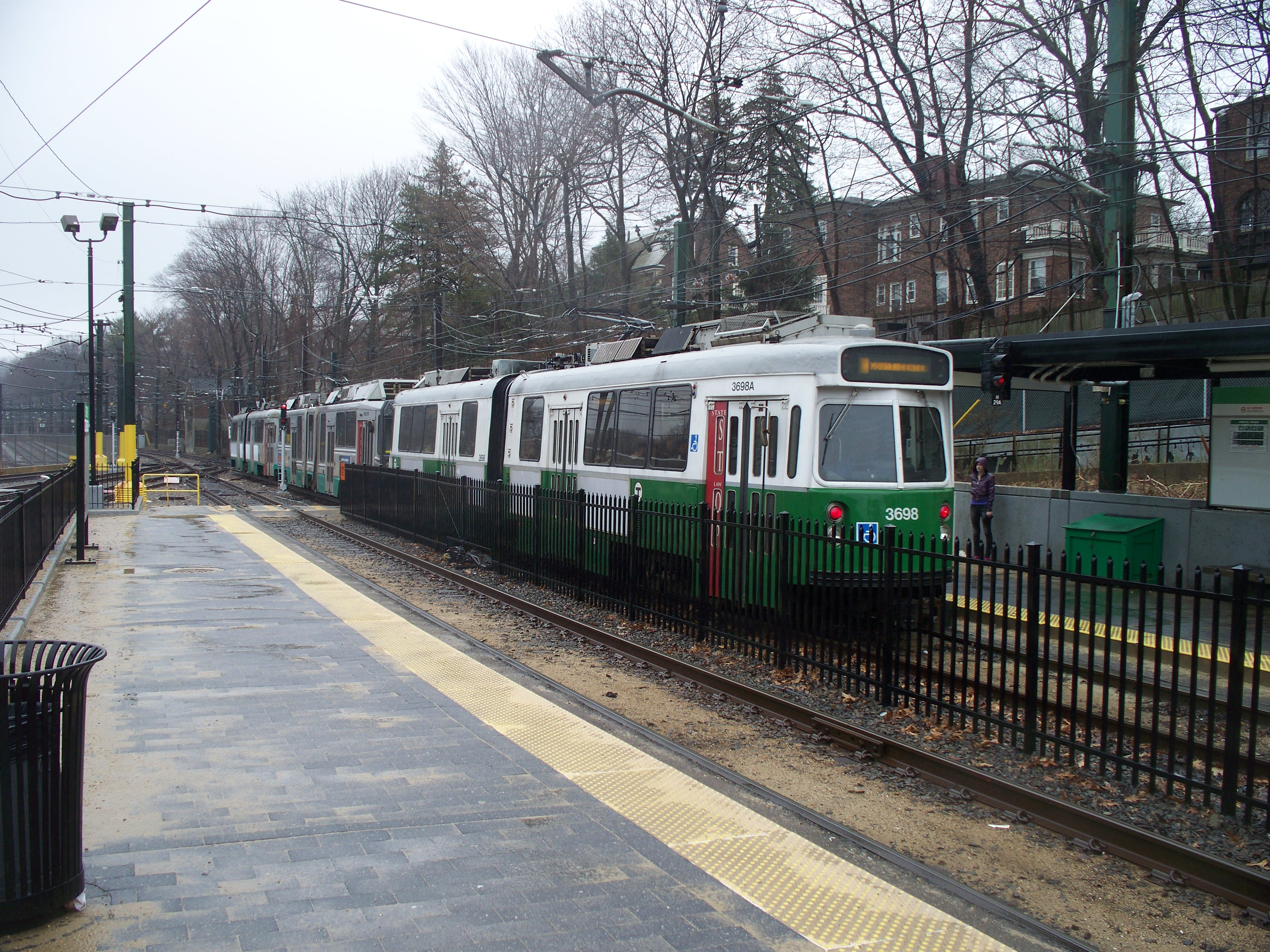
A three-car train departing Reservoir station in 2011

The tracks were rehabilitated again in 2007 because new Type 8 LRVs did not operate reliably at the desired 40 to 50 mph (65–80 km/h) speeds. Unlike previous rolling stock, the D branch was the last to get the new LRvs due to the need to upgrade the tracks. Shuttle buses replaced rail service between Riverside and Reservoir from June 23 to August 3, 2007, and between Reservoir and Fenway from August 4–31. On May 28, 2008, two trains collided between Woodland and Waban stations, killing the operator of the rear train. The National Transportation Safety Board investigation concluded that the operator likely had an episode of micro-sleep caused by sleep apnea.

On October 25, 2010, the MBTA began operating some three-car trains on the D branch at peak hours. This was expanded on March 21, 2011, but was discontinued on March 21, 2016, in favor of operating two-car trains on more consistent headways. On March 22, 2014, Government Center closed for reconstruction. D branch trains terminated at Park Street during peak hours and North Station at other times. All D branch trains resumed terminating at Government Center when it reopened on March 22, 2016.

Work from 2018 to 2021 included a full modern signal system for the line between Beaconsfield and Riverside plus partial track replacements. Between October and December 2018, shuttle bus service replaced service between Brookline Hills and Reservoir every weekday evening and every weekend until after December 16. During 2019 and 2020, shuttle buses replaced service on 15 weekends and on all weeknights. The Fenway Portal project was completed on November 23, 2020. The track and signal work was completed in December 2021. Three nine-day closures of the whole D branch took place between September 24 and October 28, 2022, to allow for work including installation of a train protection system and track replacement between Eliot and Riverside.

As of 2025, the MBTA plans to use a section of the D Branch between Chestnut Hill and Newton Centre for the testing of new Type 10 vehicles until 2032. Two crossovers will be installed to allow single-track operation on a 3,900-foot (1,200 m) section of the westbound track. The eastbound track will be used as a test track.

=== Accessibility ===
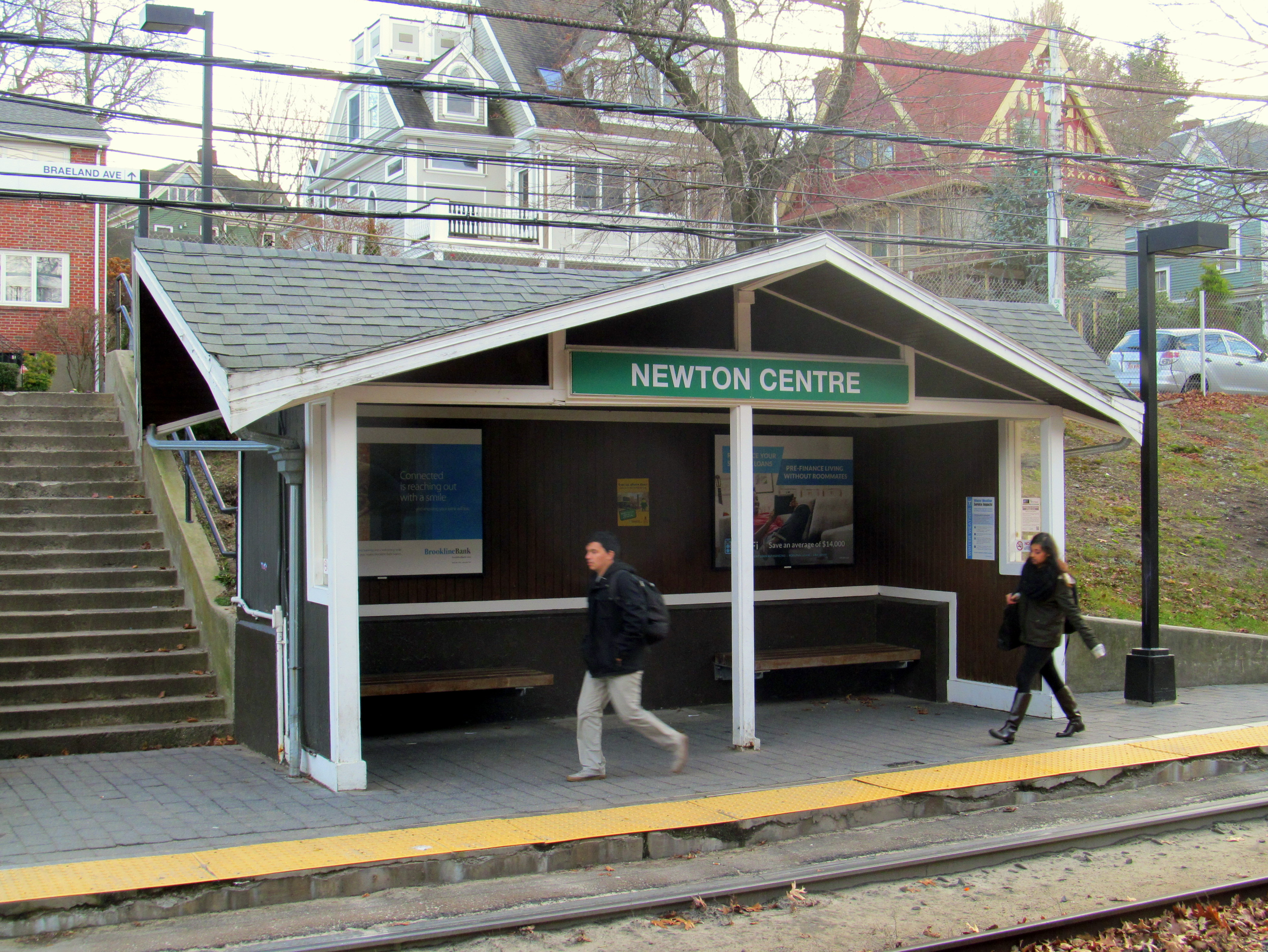
Raised platforms at Newton Centre station, which were added in 1999

Riverside station was rebuilt in the late 1990s, with raised platforms to provide accessible boarding on the Type 8 light rail vehicles then being built. Reservoir and Brookline Village were temporarily fitted with portable lifts for accessibility, with Brookline Hills added by 2003. Newton Centre, Reservoir, and Fenway were retrofitted with raised platforms in 1999. Woodland was rebuilt for accessibility in 2006, followed by Longwood and Brookline Village in 2009. Reconstruction of Brookline Hills station took place from September 2019 to January 2022 as part of the construction of an expansion of Brookline High School.

Temporary work to make Newton Highlands accessible was done in 2019–2020. Design work for a full reconstruction was completed in 2023. Design work for the remaining four non-accessible stops (Beaconsfield, Chestnut Hill, Eliot, and Waban) was completed in late 2022. They were made "generally accessible" with work done in October 2024. Full reconstructions of the four stations to serve new Type 10 vehicles are planned to begin in 2026, followed by Newton Highlands in 2027.

=== Green Line Extension ===
Original plans for the Green Line Extension called for the D branch to be extended through the rebuilt Lechmere station to Medford/Tufts station, with several intermediate stops. However, in April 2021, the MBTA indicated that the D branch would instead be extended to Union Square, with the E branch running to Medford/Tufts. The D and E branches were chosen for the extension because they serve the Longwood Medical Area; the D branch was assigned to the shorter Union Square Branch because its western leg is longer than that of the E branch.

The D branch was temporarily extended to North Station on October 24, 2021, as part of changes in preparation for the opening of the extension. The Union Square Branch opened on March 21, 2022. It was initially served by the E branch rather than the D branch. The western portion of the E branch was closed from August 6–20, 2022, for track work; during that time, Union Square was served by C branch trains plus Reservoir short turns from the D branch. All service was cut back to Government Center from August 22 to September 18, 2022, to allow for final integration of the Medford Branch and other work. Upon reopening, most D branch service (plus E branch service) began running to Union Square, though some peak hour trains short turned at Government Center. E branch trains began non-revenue test service to Medford/Tufts on November 1, 2022, leaving only the D branch serving Union Square.

The Union Square Branch was closed from September 18 to October 12, 2023, during repairs to Squires Bridge, which carries the McGrath Highway over the tracks. The closure was originally planned for July 18 to August 28, but was delayed and shortened due to public criticism.

== Station listing ==
Location	Station	Opened	Notes and connections
Somerville	Union Square	March 21, 2022	MBTA bus: 85, 87, 91, 109
East Cambridge	Lechmere	March 21, 2022	MBTA bus: 69, 80, 87, 88; EZRide; Original surface station was open from July 10, 1922, to May 23, 2020.
West End	Science Park	August 20, 1955	
North End	North Station	June 28, 2004	MBTA subway: Orange Line; MBTA Commuter Rail: Fitchburg, Lowell, Haverhill, Newburyport/Rockport; MBTA bus: 4 Amtrak: Downeaster; EZRide; MBTA ferry: F10 (at Lovejoy Wharf); Seaport Ferry (at Lovejoy Wharf); Original surface station was open from September 3, 1898 to March 27, 1997. Elevated station was open from June 1, 1912 to June 24, 2004.
North End	Haymarket	September 3, 1898	MBTA subway: Orange Line; MBTA bus: 4, 92, 93, 111, 354, 426, 428, 450
Downtown Boston	Government Center	September 3, 1898	MBTA subway: Blue Line; MBTA bus: 354
Downtown Boston	Park Street	September 1, 1897	MBTA subway: Red Line, Silver Line (SL5); MBTA bus: 43; At Downtown Crossing: Orange Line; 7, 11, 501, 504, 505
Downtown Boston	Boylston	September 1, 1897	MBTA subway: Silver Line (SL5); MBTA bus: 43
Back Bay	Arlington	November 13, 1921	MBTA bus: 9, 10, 55, 501, 504
Back Bay	Copley	October 3, 1914	MBTA bus: 9, 10, 39, 55, 501, 504
Back Bay	Hynes Convention Center	October 3, 1914	MBTA bus: 1, 55
Fenway–Kenmore	Kenmore	October 23, 1932	MBTA bus: 8, 19, 57, 60; At Lansdowne: Framingham/Worcester Line
Fenway–Kenmore	Fenway	July 4, 1959	MBTA bus: 47, 85
Brookline	Longwood	July 4, 1959	
Brookline	Brookline Village	July 4, 1959	MBTA bus: 60, 65, 66
Brookline	Brookline Hills	July 4, 1959	MBTA bus: 60
Brookline	Beaconsfield	July 4, 1959	
Brookline	Reservoir	July 4, 1959	MBTA bus: 51, 86; At Cleveland Circle:
Newton	Chestnut Hill	July 4, 1959	
Newton	Newton Centre	July 4, 1959	MBTA bus: 52
Newton	Newton Highlands	July 4, 1959	MBTA bus: 59; 128 Business Council: N1
Newton	Eliot	July 4, 1959	
Newton	Waban	July 4, 1959	
Newton	Woodland	July 4, 1959	MWRTA: 201
Newton	Riverside	July 4, 1959	MBTA bus: 558; MWRTA: MassBay Riverside Shuttle; Blue Apple Bus, Go Buses, Megabus
