= Riverside station (MBTA) =

Light rail station in Newton, Massachusetts, US

Riverside
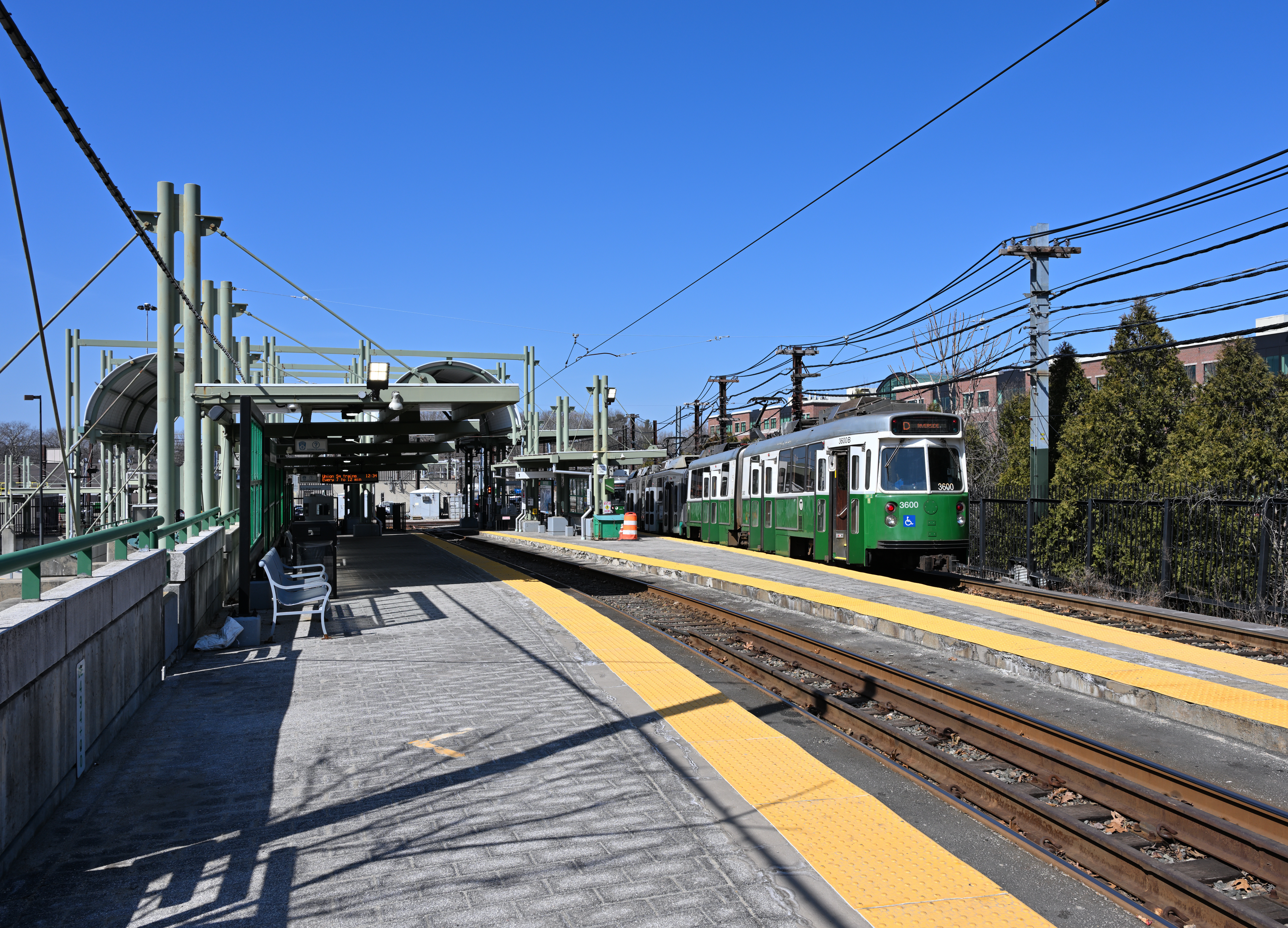
- A train at Riverside station in March 2025

General information
- Location: 331 Grove Street; Auburndale, Newton, Massachusetts
- Coordinates: 42.3373°N 71.2524°W
- Line: Highland branch
- Platforms: 1 side platform, 1 island platform
- Tracks: 2
- Connections: MBTA bus: 558; MWRTA: MassBay Riverside Shuttle; Blue Apple Bus, Go Buses, Megabus

Construction
- Parking: 925 spaces ($6.00 fee)
- Cycle facilities: 48 spaces
- Accessible: Yes

History
- Opened: July 4, 1959
- Rebuilt: 1995

Passengers
- FY2019: 1,855 daily boardings

Services
Preceding station	MBTA	Following station
Terminus	Green Line D branch	Woodland toward Union Square
Former services
Preceding station	MBTA	Following station
Wellesley Farms toward Framingham	Framingham/Worcester Line station closed 1977	Auburndale toward South Station
Preceding station	New York Central Railroad	Following station
Wellesley Farms toward Albany	Boston and Albany Railroad Main Line	Auburndale toward Boston
Terminus	Highland branch	Woodland toward Boston
Location

Riverside station is a Massachusetts Bay Transportation Authority (MBTA) Green Line light rail station located in the Auburndale village of Newton, Massachusetts. It is the western terminal of the Green Line D branch service. The station is located near the interchange of Interstate 95 (Route 128) and the Massachusetts Turnpike (I-90) and serves as a regional park and ride station. West of the station is Riverside Yard, the main maintenance facility and largest storage yard for the Green Line. The station is fully accessible.

== History ==
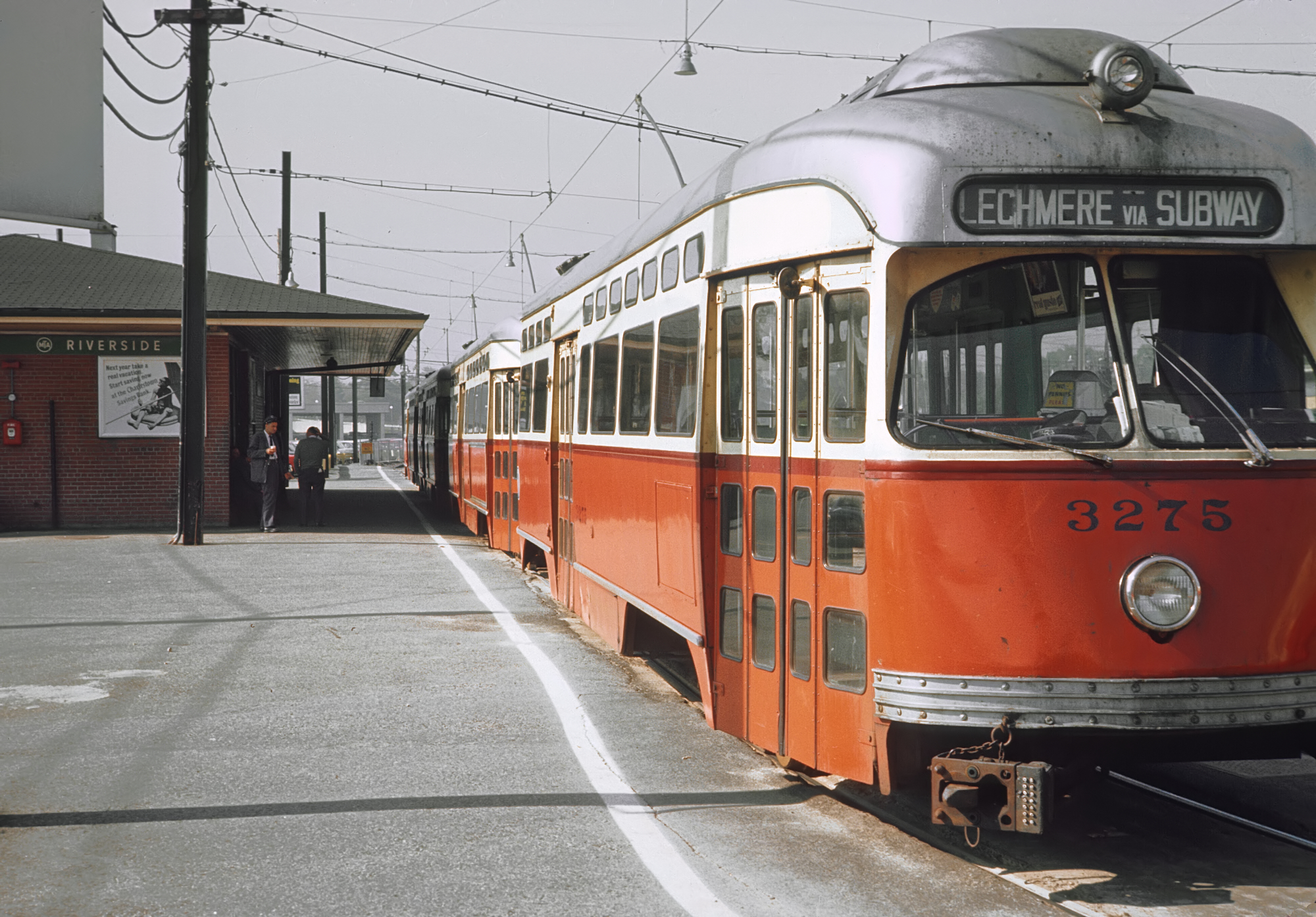
Streetcars at Riverside in September 1965

Map of Riverside station and yard showing current and former platform locations

The Boston and Worcester Railroad opened through Newton in 1834. A station at Riverside, named for its location just east of the railroad's bridge over the Charles River, opened in the 1850s. The railroad merged into the Boston and Albany Railroad (B&A) in 1867. In 1886, the B&A completed its Highland branch, which rejoined the mainline at Riverside. "Newton Circuit" service operated via the mainline and the branch.

Highland branch service ended in 1958 for conversion to a streetcar line. The Metropolitan Transportation Authority built a new Riverside station with a large commuter parking lot and brick station building in a former gravel pit south of the existing station. Streetcar service began on July 4, 1959. Limited commuter rail service continued to the mainline station until October 28, 1977.

In 1995, new elevated platforms were built at the north end of the yard and the 1959-built station used as a bus terminal. The 1995-built platforms were raised slightly above track level; these made the station accessible when low-floor light rail vehicles arrived in 2002. Riverside is the only surface-level Green Line station with a prepayment (fare controlled) platform area. This allows passengers to board at all doors. Fare control began during morning peak hours only when the current platforms opened in 1995, and full-time effective December 18, 2006, when the CharlieCard fare card system was introduced.

A track connection still exists with the main line; catenary is installed up to the junction for offloading vehicles delivered by the railroad onto the light rail network. On October 20, 1996, severe flooding overflowed the banks of the Muddy River and flooded the Green Line subway from the western portals to Boylston. From October 23 to 25, a commuter rail shuttle was run from a temporary platform at Riverside to South Station using the old track connection.

Some Intercity bus services to and from Boston offer limited service to Riverside. This was temporarily suspended in early 2010, but was reinstated that October. Blue Apple Bus added a Riverside stop to its Mansfield–Logan Airport service in November 2025.

In 2014, the state announced plans Riverside would be the terminus of a proposed DMU Indigo Line to South Station, via the former track connection, but the plans were cancelled in 2015. A private group plans to restore the pedestrian underpass at the former mainline station as part of a trail network in the area. The state awarded $100,000 in design funding in 2019. Riverside Yard will be modified in the late 2020s to support new Type 10 LRVs.

=== Development ===
The MBTA began planning for transit-oriented development at Riverside by the 1980s. In October 1997, Riverside was identified as a possible site for a parking garage, but this was not pursued. On February 12, 2009, the MBTA authorized an 85-year lease of a portion of the Riverside parking lots for a mixed-use development. As originally planned, the development was to contain 420,000 ft^{2} (39,000 m^{2}) of office space, 60,000 ft^{2} (5,600 m^{2}) of retail space, and 190 residential units. In late 2019, the city rezoned the site to allow for a larger development.

By 2020, plans called for 254,000 ft^{2} (23,600 m^{2}) of office space, 39,000 ft^{2} (3,600 m^{2}) of retail space, 582 residential units, a 150-room hotel, and a 1,990-space parking garage. The station was to be modified with two elevators, new ramps, and a new canopy structure. A parcel at the southwest end of the yard, originally to be used for the development, would be retained by the MBTA for yard expansion beginning around 2024.

The MBTA approved a revised plan in August 2024. Its first phase would include 545 residential units and a parking garage on the south side of the site. The surface parking lot would be reduced to 530 spaces, with 120 spaces in the garage reserved for MBTA use. A second phase in the early 2030s would add a 150,000 ft^{2} (14,000 m^{2}) office/lab building, about 100 residential units, and a second garage.
