= History of Houston =

The city of Houston in the U.S. state of Texas was founded in 1837 after Augustus and John Allen had acquired land to establish a new town at the junction of Buffalo and White Oak bayous in 1836. Houston served as the temporary capital of the Republic of Texas. Meanwhile, the town developed as a regional transportation and commercial hub. Houston was part of an independent nation until 1846 when the United States formally annexed Texas. Railroad development began in the late 1850s but ceased during the American Civil War. Houston served the Confederacy as a regional military logistics center. The population increased during the war and blockade runners used the town as a center for their operations.

Investment and development of railroads serving Houston increased the transportation options for freight and passengers while greatly increasing the number of jobs. The city limits extended to an area north of Buffalo Bayou after the American Civil War. Houston continued as an important business, social, and economic center of Texas, while establishing the first State Fair starting in 1870 and continuing through 1878.

The population surpassed 58,000 in 1900, the same year as the Great Hurricane struck Galveston. Within a few years, oil companies were establishing offices in Houston to administer oil fields in East Texas. In 1912, the Rice Institute opened its doors on its suburban campus, the first institute of higher learning in the Houston area. Several tall buildings were completed that year, including those used for offices and residences. Tax Commissioner Joseph Jay Pastoriza gained national notoriety for his property tax reform, though it was later invalidated by the Texas Supreme Court. Around this time Houston started drawing immigrants from Mexico, a trend continuing into the 1920s. Many settled in the Second Ward. During this period, the city developed Hermann Park. Houston gained national prominence when it hosted the Democratic National Convention in 1928.

== Before 1836 ==
The region known as Houston is located on land that was once home of the Karankawa (kə rang′kə wä′,-wô′,-wə) and the Atakapa (əˈtɑːkəpə) indigenous peoples for at least 2,000 years before the first known settlers arrived. However, the land remained largely uninhabited from 1700s until settlement in the 1830s.

== Republic of Texas, 1836–1845 ==
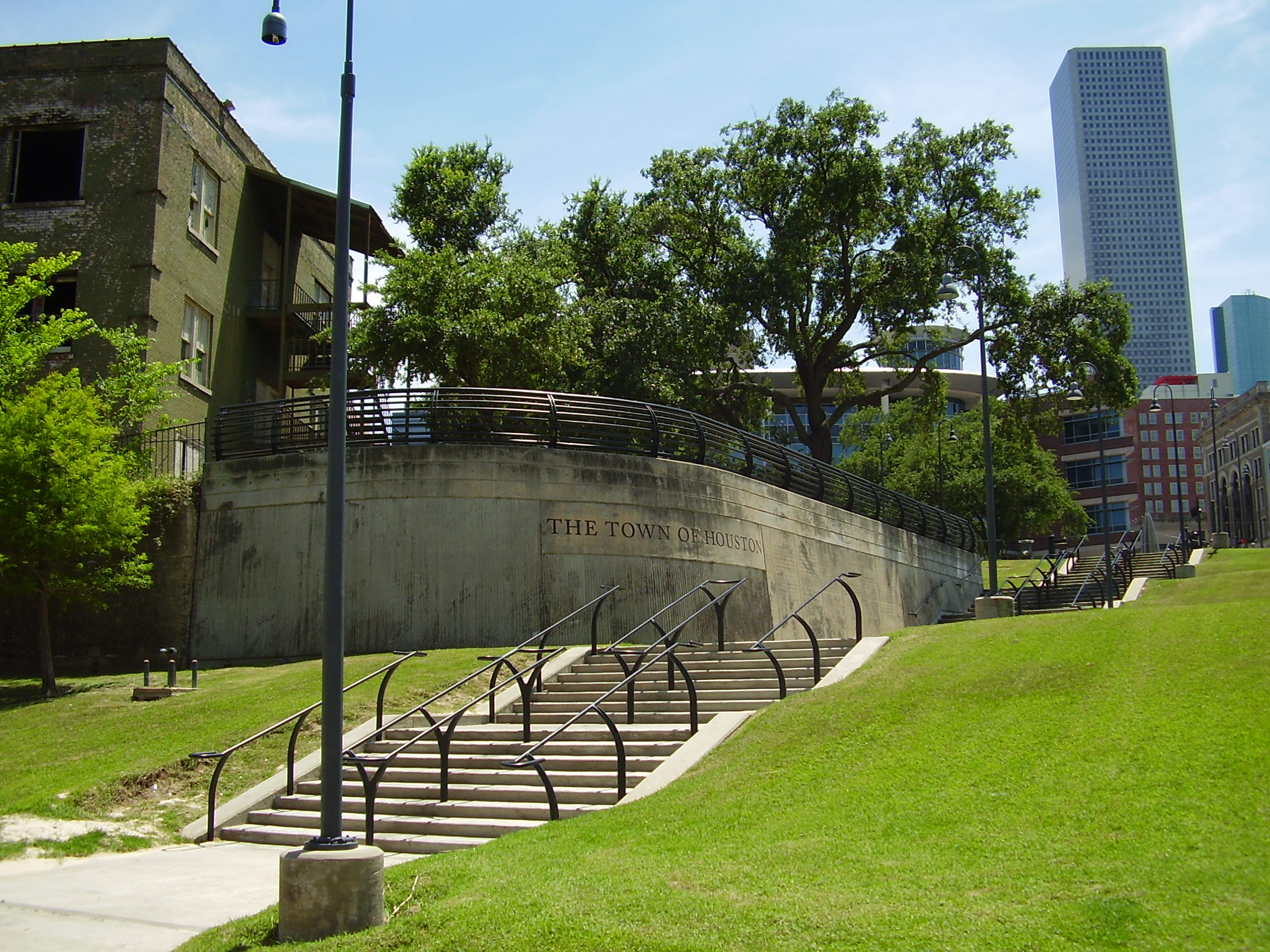
Marker in Downtown Houston commemorating the foundation of Houston by the Allen Brothers

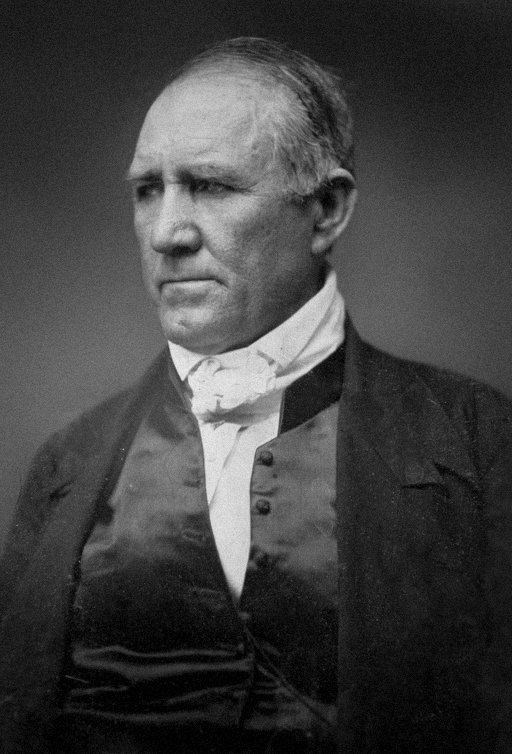
Sam Houston

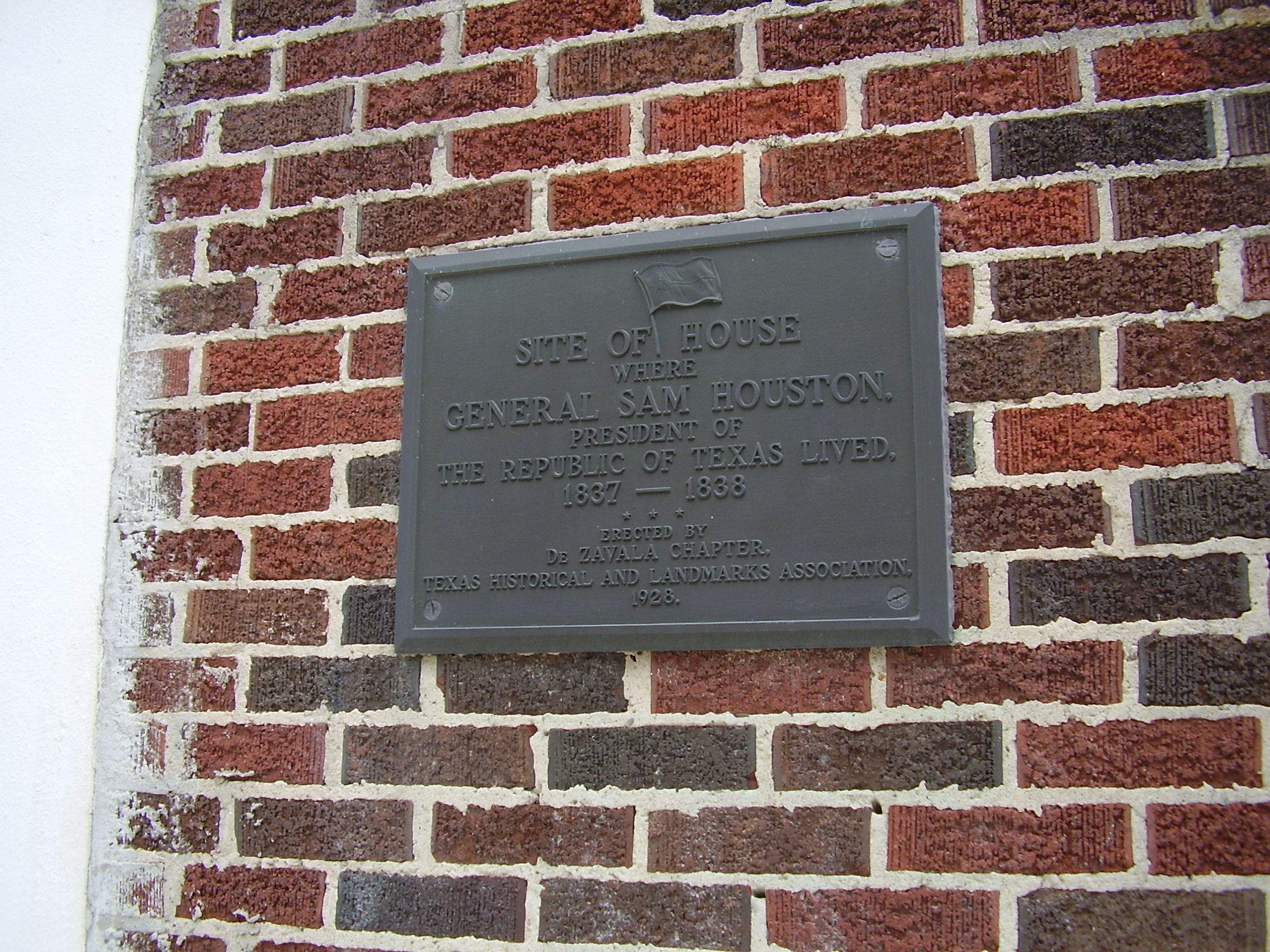
Marker on the Harris County Annex 2 Building in Downtown Houston, indicating the site where Sam Houston lived from 1837 to 1838

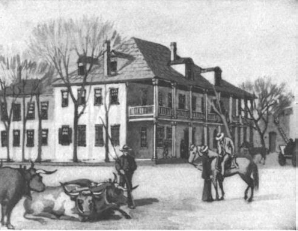
Artist's depiction of the former Capitol building in Houston

On the heels of the Texas Revolution, two real estate promoters who had arrived in Texas in 1832, John Kirby Allen and Augustus Chapman Allen, were seeking a new town site within the Galveston Bay navigation system. They had invested in Galveston already, but they continued to make offers for other tracts in the region. They bid on land at Morgan's Point and Harrisburg before settling on the eventual Houston site. On August 26, 1836, they purchased half a league of land, or about 2,214 acres (896 ha) from Elizabeth (Mrs. T. F. L.) Parrot, John Austin's widow for $5,000. Four days later, the Allen brothers placed an advertisement in the Telegraph and Texas Register for the paper town of Houston. Gail Borden and his assistant Moses Lapham conducted preliminary surveying work in October, taking field notes and laying stakes. Meanwhile, John Allen was back in Columbia lobbying members of Texas Congress to designate the not yet surveyed town and promising to construct government buildings. On November 30, a special joint session of Congress considered fifteen possible locations for the next seat of government. On the first ballot, ten of these locations garnered votes, but Houston gained a majority of votes on the fourth ballot.

The Allen brothers chose a site at the confluence of White Oak Bayou and Buffalo Bayou, which served as a natural turning basin, now known as Allen's Landing. The Laura, the first steamship ever to visit Houston, arrived in January 1837, at which time the town totaled twelve residents and one log cabin. Four months later there were 1,500 people and 100 houses. Critical to the promotion of Houston by the Allen brothers was the importance of its location as a natural logistical center. They claimed that the town lay at the "head of navigation" on Buffalo Bayou. Their critics cast doubt on the navigability of Buffalo Bayou as far upstream as Houston, who had not been convinced by the arrival of the Laura. A true test would be a larger ship making the trip. The Allen brothers commissioned the 262-ton Constitution to travel to Houston. Captain Edward Auld piloted the large, deep-draft steamer to the wharf at the foot of Main Street, and earned $1,000 for performing this task. However, the Constitution—measuring at 150 feet—was too long to make the three point turn using the mouth of White Oak Bayou. Unable to turn the ship around at Houston, Auld ran the engines in reverse for over six miles until he found a natural turning basin. The Allen brothers published an announcement of the Constitution's feat with the headline "The Fact Proven".

In May 1837, the Texas Congress met for the first time in Houston. The First Texas Congress had initially convened in Columbia, Texas, but adjourned the first session on December 22, 1836. The First Congress reconvened in Houston to finish its business five months later. Houston was granted incorporation by the Texas legislature on June 5, 1837. At this time, drunkenness, dueling, brawling, prostitution, and profanity began to become a problem in early Houston. Soon, Houstonians were prompted to put an end to their problems; so, they wanted to make a Chamber of Commerce just for the city. A bill had been introduced on November 26, 1838, in Congress that would establish this entity. President Mirabeau B. Lamar signed the act into law on January 28, 1840. This move could not have come sooner, as the city was suffering from financial problems and numerous yellow fever outbreaks, including an 1839 outbreak that killed about 12 percent of its population. Also, on January 14, 1839, the capital had been moved to Austin, known as Waterloo at the time. On April 4, 1840, John Carlos hosted a meeting to establish the Houston Chamber of Commerce at the City Exchange building. E.S. Perkins presided as its first president. In addition to Perkins and Carlos, the charter members admitted were: Henry R. Allen, T. Francis Brewer, Jacob De Cordova, J. Temple Doswell, George Gazley, Dewitt C. Harris, J. Hart, Charles J. Hedenburg, Thomas M. League, Charles Kesler, Charles A. Morris, E. Osborne, and John W. Pitkin. Undergrowth and snags had been the greatest obstacle to navigating Buffalo Bayou; yet by 1840, there was an accumulation of sunken ships. This was the principal concern of the new Houston Chamber of Commerce. The city of Houston and Harris County responded by allocating taxpayer money for bayou clearance, and on March 1, 1841, the first wreck was pulled out the bayou under this program.

The original municipal government structure was a mayor and eight aldermen, all elected at large. Two charter amendments, one in 1839 and the other in 1840, divided the town into four wards, using Main and Commerce streets as axes. Each ward elected two alderman under this system. The wards are no longer political divisions, but some of the names are still used, even though they do not refer to the original boundaries.

Serious violence was a daily occurrence in the late 1830s. In addition to assault via a gentleman's cane, street violence emanated from Houston's many saloons and brothels. When Mexico was again threatening Texas, President Sam Houston moved the capital to Houston on June 27, 1842. However, the Austin residents wanted to keep the archives in their city. This would be known as the Archive Wars. The capital was then moved to Washington on-the-Brazos on September 29. Austin became capital again in 1845, just before Texas gained statehood.

== Early statehood, 1845–1861 ==
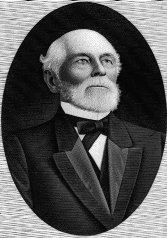
Portrait of mercantilist, William Marsh Rice

In the early statehood era, historian Harold Platt notes the emergence of "commercial-civic elites," a term borrowed from Blaine A. Brownell. Commercial leaders blurred sharp distinctions between economic activity and social relationships. One example was the business partnership of Thomas W. House and Charles Shearn. House started in Houston as a junior partner with the elder Shearn. House married Shearn's daughter while transitioning from his bakery into a cotton mercantile store, and later moving into the banking and real estate businesses. By the mid-1850s, his investment portfolio included transportation concerns, such as plank roads, railroads, and navigation companies. House was a founder of the Shearn Methodist Church and a co-founder of the first volunteer fire company in Houston. In 1857 he was elected as an alderman.

During Houston's first few years, it had many characteristics of a frontier town. Though this trend briefly reversed, the demographics of Houston's free population regressed toward those of a frontier town again during the 1850s. The imbalance in population favoring males increased, the median age was greater than the US at-large, and these males were less likely to be married. The number of young men quadrupled from 1850 to 1860, but the total population merely doubled during the same period. In 1850, Houston had 115 males for every hundred females, and this ratio increased to 136 per hundred by 1860. Saloons and gambling halls proliferated and were well attended, and violence was common. One in three Houstonians were born abroad, many coming from German-speaking countries. More than one of every five Houstonians during this period was an enslaved person. Though the percentage of bondsmen in Houston was comparable to those of other southern cities, there was a lower proportion of slaveowners. The practice of "hiring out" enslaved persons was common in Houston at the eve of the American Civil War. Houston's total population grew to 4,428 by 1860, and its footprint expanded to the southwest by several blocks, reaching to a part of current-day Hadley Street. Urban bondsmen performed manual labor, such as construction, or moving freight at the wharf or to and from the warehouses; others worked as servants at private homes and hotels, or as cooks and waiters.

Railroads started to emanate from Houston in the 1850s. However, the first railroad to operate in Texas was the Buffalo Bayou, Brazos and Colorado Railway, which terminated at Harrisburg, Houston's rival to the east. This road began service in 1853. Houston gained access to this railway to the Brazos bottoms in October 1856 through the construction of the Houston Tap Road. Construction on a railroad based in Houston started in 1853. The railroad, which was later known as the Houston and Texas Central Railway (H&TC), was complete to Cypress in 1853. The H&TC progressed beyond Cypress, laying track through Hempstead and Navasota, and reached Millican on the eve of the Civil War. Meanwhile, in 1858, the municipally owned Houston Tap was acquired by a private railroad developer, and served as the basis for the Houston Tap and Brazoria Railway, a road to the sugar plantations, which began service to Columbia in 1860. Another railroad opened during this period, accessing Houston from its initial southern terminus opposite Galveston. The Galveston, Houston and Henderson Railroad completed tracks from Virginia Point to Houston on January 8, 1859. The next year Houston provided railroad access to Galveston when the Island City finished the long viaduct across the back bay. From 1857, the Texas and New Orleans Railroad broke ground north of Buffalo Bayou in 1857 and continued to construct the road into East Texas through 1860.

== American Civil War, 1861–1865 ==
In 1860, the U.S. Census lists 4,845 inhabitants in Houston, including 1,069 enslaved (99 % of the city's African American population). Most Houstonians then supported John C. Breckinridge, the Southern Democratic candidate for president. As the American Civil War began, there was tension between supporters of the Confederacy and the few Union sympathizers. There are no voting tallies for Houston and there are inconsistencies in the records of the secession vote, yet, Harris County voted heavily in favor of secession on February 23, 1861, by a margin as high as seven-to-one. The Chamber of Commerce kept the city together during the conflict.

Houston was an important regional center during the Confederacy. The town served as a military logistics center, the Quartermaster Depot for Texas, and the headquarters of a wartime administrative district which included Texas, New Mexico, and Arizona. An influx of refugees from Louisiana and Galveston nearly doubled Houston's wartime population compared to 1860. Since the town suffered no direct attacks, it was prosperous compared to many other communities in the South. Though some key merchants like William Marsh Rice left at the start of the war, businessmen from New Orleans and Galveston replaced them. Blockade runners sometimes used Houston as a port, and on occasion the Main Street wharf received foreign cargo. Despite disruptions to supply from the Union blockades, advertisements indicate at least occasional availability of staples, such as sugar, coffee, and soap; clothing, including pants, shirts, and footwear; and building supplies, like brick, and even milled pine. However, the supply of goods was not consistent, and there were periodic shortages of some staples, causing hyperflation and the need to find substitute goods, such as flavoring hot drinks with okra seeds in place of coffee. Specie was in short supply throughout the war. Housing scarcity caused rents to rise, but wages increased at the same time.

== Post-Civil War, 1866–1900 ==
=== Reconstruction ===
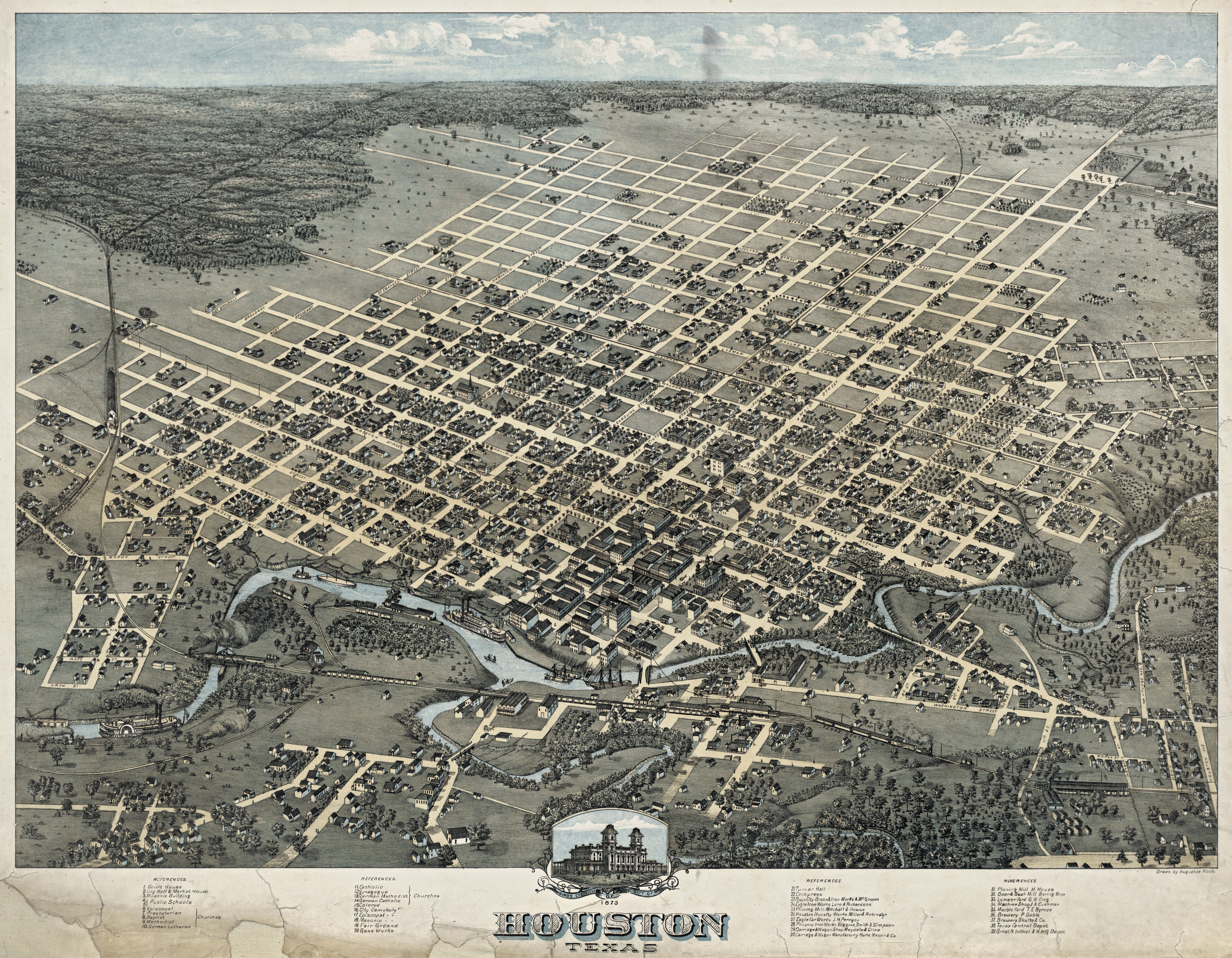
Houston, circa 1873

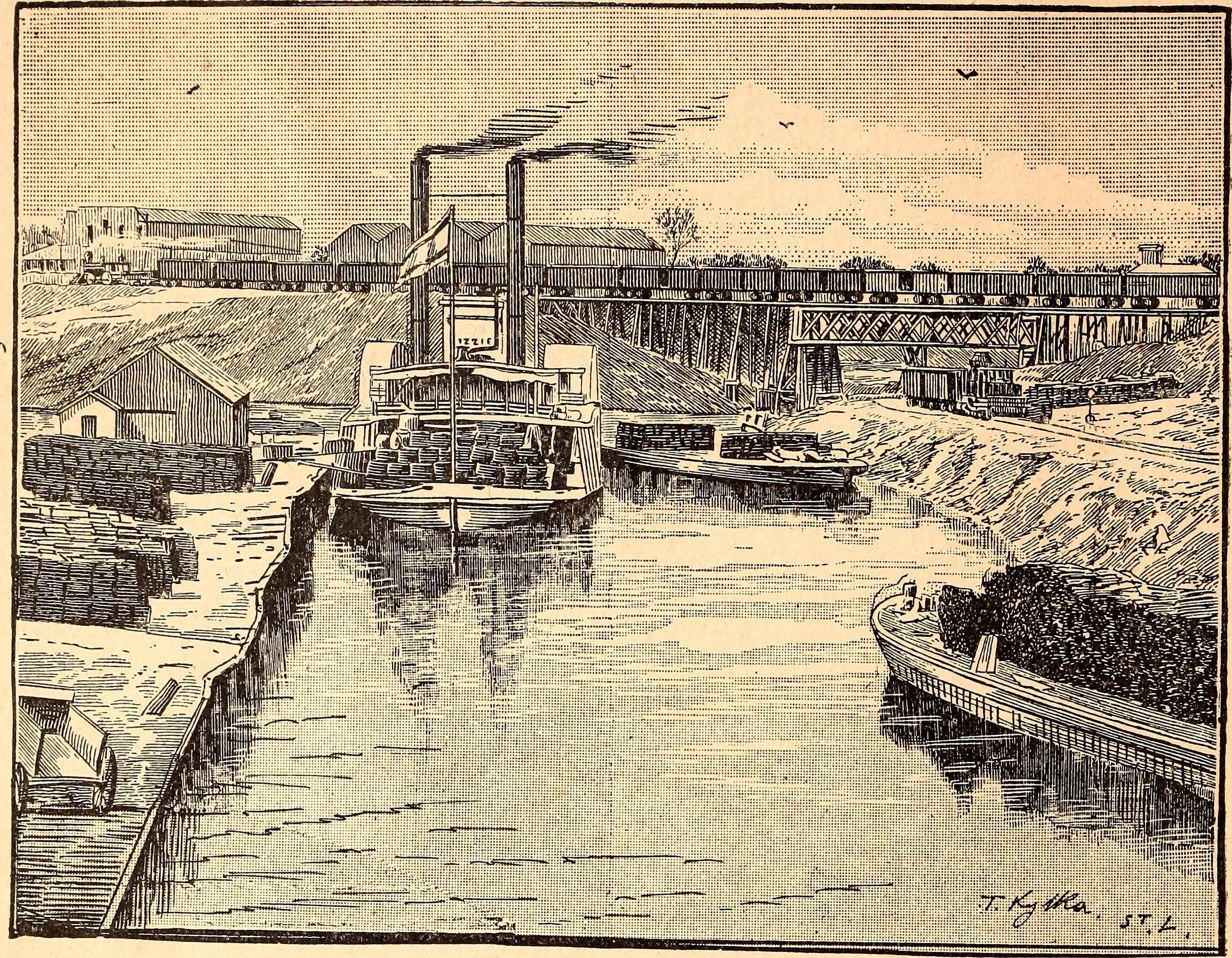
1890 Lithograph of the steamboat landing with the railroad bridge crossing White Oak Bayou in the background

The end of the American Civil War and news of emancipation spurred an influx of former slaves from the countryside into Houston. The town's incumbent black residents organized groups to help these newcomers obtain housing and employment. In the short term, however, many of these new citizens resided in abandoned buildings and tent communities.

Houston added the Fifth Ward in 1866, and the Sixth Ward in 1877. Each ward was represented by two aldermen, though by 1870, local representation was unequal based on population of the respective wards. The Fourth Ward counted 3,055 residents, contrasted with the First Ward with only 738 residents. The city did not adjust the ward boundaries to compensate for these unequal settlement patterns.

In 1869, the Ship Channel Company was formed to deepen Buffalo Bayou and improve Houston as a shipping port. Despite the postwar social unrest, migrants flocked to Texas for new opportunities. Texas businessmen joined to expand the railroad network, which contributed to Houston's primacy in the state and the development of Dallas, Fort Worth, San Antonio and El Paso.

After Texas was readmitted to the Union on April 16, 1870, Houston continued its growth. Houston was designated as an official port of entry on July 16, 1870. Its new charter drew up eight wards. Many freedmen opened businesses and worked for wages under contracts. The Freedmen's Bureau stopped abuse of the contracts in 1870. Many African Americans at the time were in unskilled labor. Many former slaves legalized their marriages after the American Civil War. White legislators insisted on segregated schools. White Democrats regained power in the state legislature in the late 1870s, often after violence and intimidation to suppress African-American voting. In the late 19th and early 20th centuries, Texas passed a new constitution and laws that effectively disenfranchised most African Americans by making voter registration and voting more complicated and subject to white administration. The Democratic-dominated legislature passed Jim Crow laws to establish and enforce legal segregation across the state.

Houston was the site of the first Texas State Fair in 1870. The Mechanical and Blood Stock Association of Texas convened the first and second state fairs on a temporary site north of Buffalo Bayou. The organization later purchased a more lasting fairground area within the Obedience Smith Survey, in an area more recently known as "Midtown," south of the original Houston survey. They used this new site for the first time in 1872, where new streetcar service conveyed visitors between the fair and central Houston. The last fair State fair in Houston was held in 1878.

=== Gilded Age ===
Houston continued its rapid population growth which started in the 1860s. Houston, like many other cities, attracted many Americans seeking job opportunities. In 1870, Houston counted 9,382 residents and grew by rates of 77 percent, 67 percent, and 62 percent in the following three decades. The percentage of foreign-born Houstonians declined from 17 percent in 1870 to 11 percent in 1890, but the percentage of African-American residents held steady.

Houston City Streetway Company (HCSC) began operating construction and operation of animal-powered streetcar lines in 1874. The first streetcar service began in 1868, but these early attempts to establish service in Houston were commercial failures. HCSC developed service in the business district, then centered on Congress Avenue and Main Street, though one the first four lines extended as fair south as the Fairgrounds. Another line offered service on Congress to the International & Great Northern Railroad depot. Suburban subdivisions were developed near the Fairgrounds around the same time, and residential developers used the emerging streetcar lines to promote these new subdivisions. Lots sales in these more remote areas, however, did not sell quickly in the 1870s. An upstart company, the Bayou City Street Railway, built its main line further south on Texas Avenue in 1883. Later the same year, William Sinclair and Henry MacGregor acquired both streetcar companies and consolidated their operations. From 1874 until 1891 all of the transit service was operated using mule-driven streetcars, when electric streetcars began to be implemented in their place.

Lumber became a large part of the port's exports, with merchandise as its chief import. The Houston Post was established in 1880. The Houston Chronicle followed on August 23 of that year. In 1887, the Sisters of Charity of the Incarnate Word established a hospital that would become St. Joseph Hospital.

According to the 1890 U.S. census, Houston was home to 210 manufacturers hiring over 3,000 employees, about 300 of whom were white-collar workers. These companies included metal working facilities, such as blacksmith shops, iron foundries, and wheelwrights; woodworkers, such as cabinet makers and millworks; and many publishers and printers. Over 1,100 workers were employed by Houston railroads, many of them at the large shops of the Southern Pacific Railroad, the Houston and Texas Central Railroad, and the Houston, East and West Texas Railway. Three years later, there were ten railroads doing business in Houston.

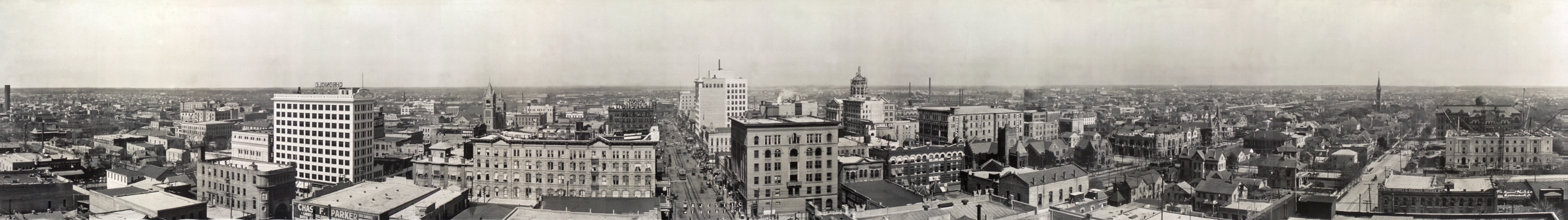
Houston panorama c. 1910

In the late-nineteenth century, Houston was losing to Galveston in the regional competition for shares of the ocean-going shipping trade. Buffalo Bayou was too narrow to and spindly to receive large vessels. Houston business leaders in the 1890s persuaded United States Representative Joseph Chappell Hutcheson to introduce a bill for a federal grant to survey Buffalo Bayou. While Hutcheson retired from Congress shortly later, his replacement, Thomas Henry Ball learned about the project from Houston businessmen and made Houston's advocacy his main issue while in Congress. Ball was elected to Congress in 1896. Ball, Horace Baldwin Rice, and Charles Milby were among the Houstonians leading a tour of the ship channel on behalf of the House Committee on Rivers and Harbors.

== Progressive era, 1901–1928 ==
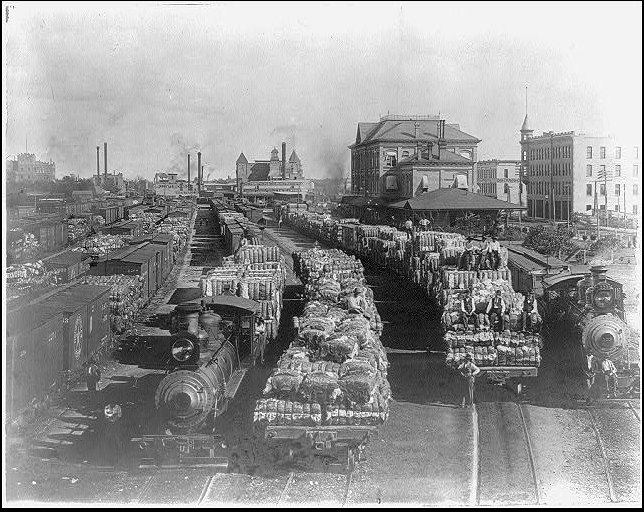
1904 photo of cotton-laden railcars at a yard in Houston

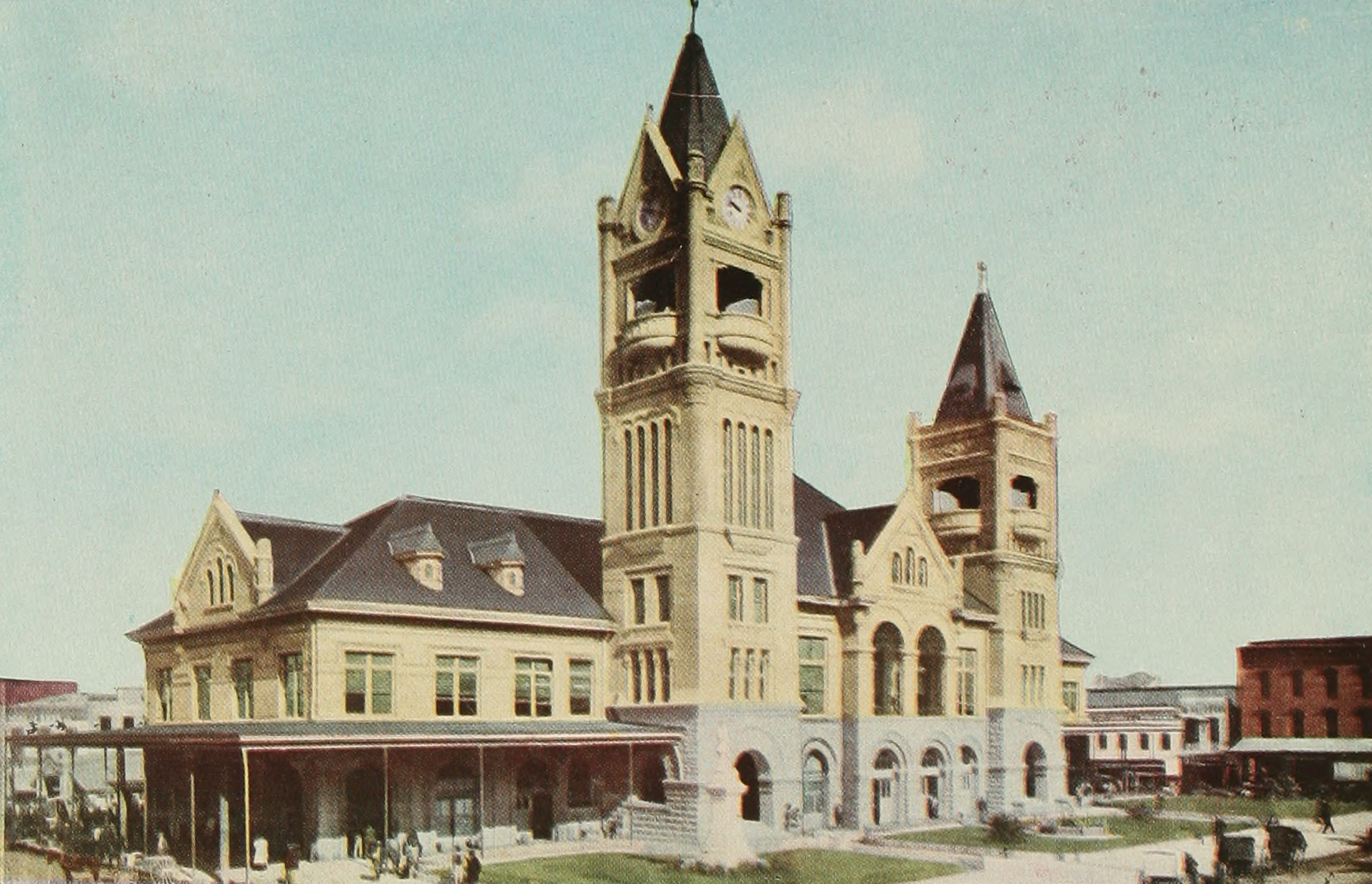
City Hall of Houston, 1913

On September 8, the Galveston Hurricane of 1900 savagely tore apart the city of Galveston, Texas. Houston suffered mainly property damage from high winds and four inches of rainfall, though one death was reported. The city mobilized to convey fresh water, food, medical supplies, and clothing to Galveston via steamboat and repaired damaged railroads in order to reestablish service to the island. Survivors fled Galveston to seek temporary shelter in Houston. The 1900 census reported that 58,203 people were living in Houston. A year later, wildcatters were digging wells at Spindletop as Houston emerged as a regional petroleum center, the home base of many new oil companies. A few Houstonians were buying the first automobiles in the city, while two local breweries produced and sold more than 200,000 barrels of beer. Two major fires struck the city, destroying the Market House and one of the top hotels in town, Hutchins House. New subdivisions developed along the streetcar lines, mostly toward the south. One new addition to the city was Westmoreland.

Around 1910, large numbers of Mexican immigrants settled in the "Segundo Barrio" (Second Ward), near industrial jobs for railroads and manufacturers of supplies for railroads. The Rusk Settlement House and El Campo Laurel lodge were two Second Ward organizations serving the emerging Mexican community in Houston. The Archdiocese of Galveston dispatched a missionary to the area, and later this initiative evolved into the Lady of Guadalupe Church. Several Protestant churches in the area followed. Revolution in Mexico the same year changed the immigration dynamic. In some cases, war induced Mexican-Houstonians to return to their native country to join the fight or assist family, but as the war dragged on, immigration from Mexico to Houston increased, mostly from the northern states of Coahuila, Nuevo León, and San Luis Potosí. Civil unrest in Mexico persisted into the 1920s, promoting continued immigration and the development of a robust Mexican-American community in Houston.

In 1912, Joseph Jay Pastoriza introduced property tax reform to Houston. The "Houston Single Tax Plan" was based on Georgist principles and redistributed property tax burden from owners of personal property and developed land to owners of undeveloped land. While the Houston Plan was not a true single tax, it re-weighted appraisals to 70 percent of unimproved land and 25 percent of developed land. Personal property was exempt from local taxes according to this plan. This continued for a few years until 1915, when two courts ruled the plan illegal according to the Texas Constitution. Pastoriza continued to serve as Houston Tax Commissioner until 1917, when he became the first Mayor of Houston of Hispanic heritage. He died after just three months in office.

In 1912, Houston established its first institution of higher learning. The Rice Institute, now Rice University, opened with an endowment of around $9 million. The board hired Edgar Odell Lovett as the school's first president, who recruited Julian Huxley as a professor of biology and Harold Wilson as a professor of physics.

By 1912, Houston was home to twenty-five "tall buildings" ranging from six to sixteen stories. Office buildings extant in 1912 include the eleven-story Scanlan Building, the marble-clad South Texas National Bank Building, the eight-story First National Bank Building, the twelve-story Union National Bank building, the ten-story Houston Chronicle Building, and the Southwestern Telephone Company Building. The sixteen-story Carter Building was the tallest in Houston. There were two major passenger train facilities, Union Station and Grand Central Station. Residential buildings included the Beaconsfield apartments, Rossonian apartments, the Savoy flats, and the Hotel Bender. Under construction in 1912 was the Rice Hotel.

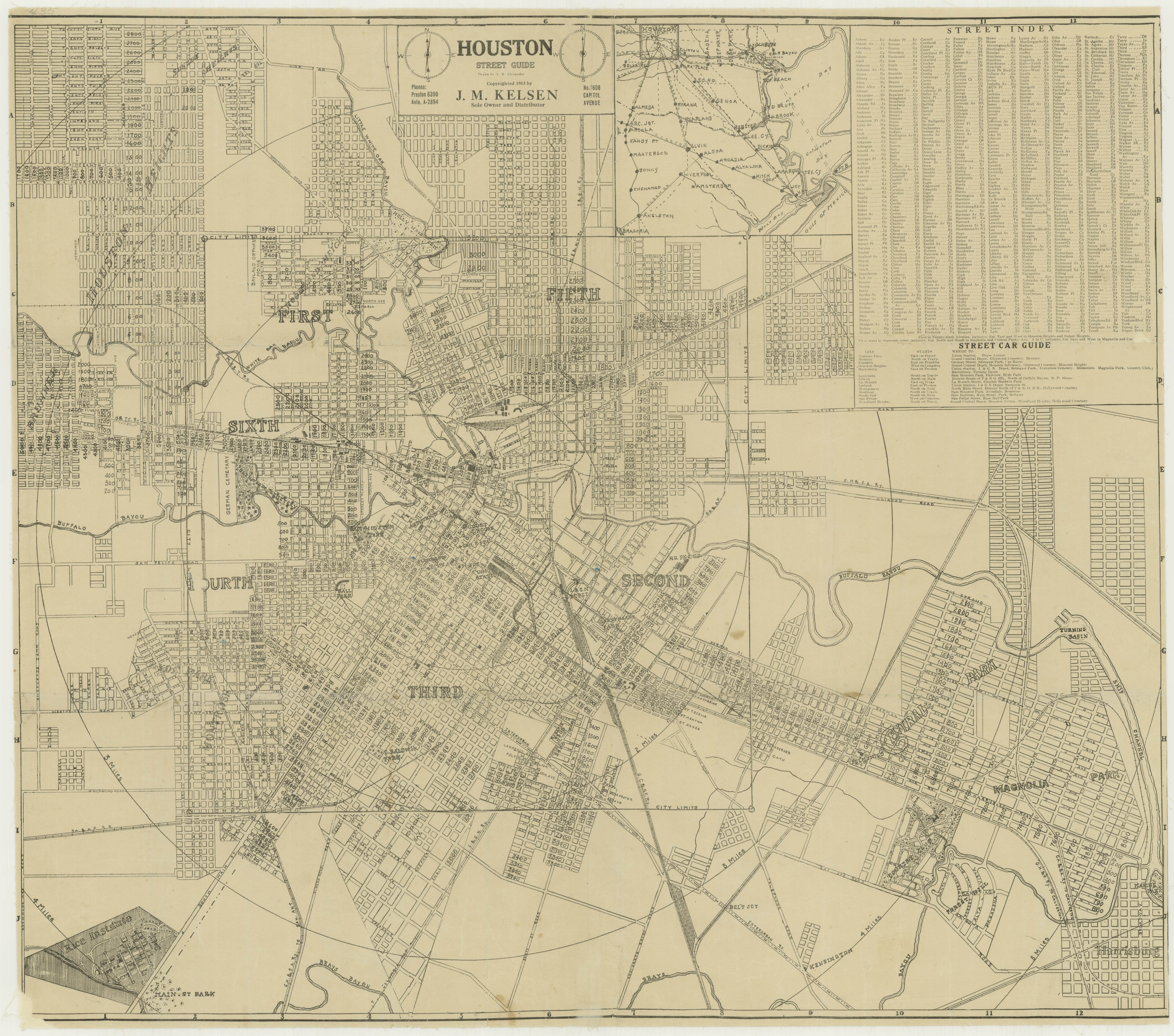
Map of Houston, 1913

In early 1917 the U.S. War Department ordered two military installations to be built in Harris County: Camp Logan and Ellington Field. The U.S. Army deployed a battalion of the all-black 24th Infantry Regiment to guard the construction site at Camp Logan. Racial tension in the city rose as the black soldiers received hostile treatment in the racially segregated city. Tensions flared into a full-blown riot in August 1917; the Camp Logan Riot resulted in the deaths of fifteen whites (including four policemen) and four black soldiers, and scores of additional injuries.

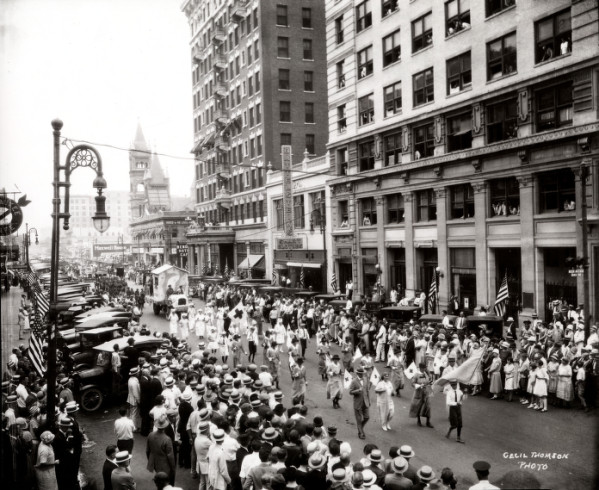
World War I homecoming parade (Main Street at Rusk Avenue)

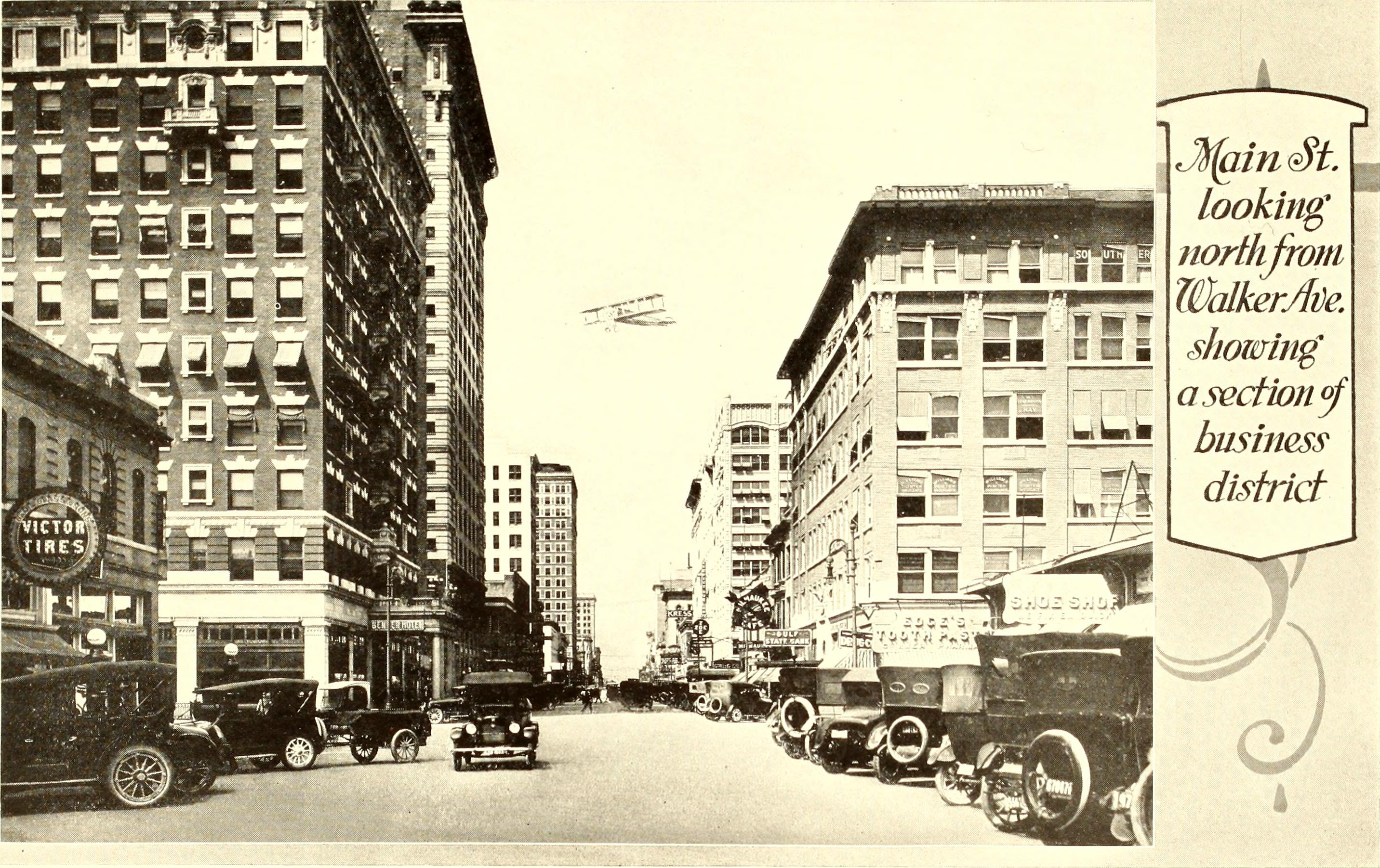
Houston in 1922

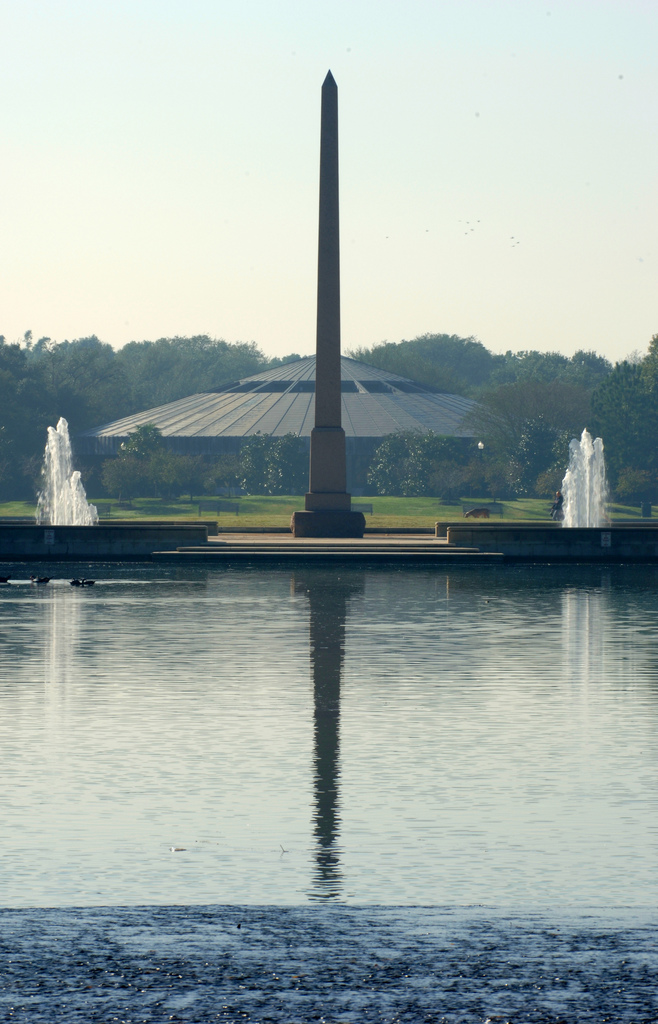
The Pioneer Memorial obelisk stands at the end of the Reflecting Pool in Hermann Park. It was erected by the San Jacinto Centennial Association and dedicated on August 30, 1936.

During the 1920s, the city of Houston developed Hermann Park based in part on plans by Arthur Comey and George Kessler on land donated by George H. Hermann in 1922. The Houston Zoological Garden opened on the park grounds two years later. The park complex expanded with the construction of Museum of Natural History and a full-size golf course. Several smaller buildings were also added, as well as several curving roads to provide automobile access through the grounds. Will Hogg donated another large tract for an expansion to the park.

In addition to the land donation for the park, Hermann gifted a large sum of money in order to establish a hospital. The Hermann Hospital Estate established a site on Main Street east of the new Rice University and south of the new Hermann Park for its planned hospital. The trustees choose Berwin and Swern as the lead architects, to be assisted by local architect, Alfred C. Finn. Hermann Hospital was finished in 1925. The Spanish Renaissance-style building featured stuccoed exterior walls and red tile roofs. That year, the Texas Dental School began construction nearby on Fannin Street.

Houston hosted the 1928 Democratic National Convention. The city council and Mayor Oscar Holcombe appropriated $100,000 for a new convention hall. They commissioned Kenneth Franzheim and Alfred C. Finn for design and construction management of the new hall. After condemning and demolishing some houses to clear the site, Sam Houston Hall was complete within four months. The city expected 25,000 conventioneers, and the new facility was larger than Madison Square Garden. Houston spent another $100,000 for beautification, mainly with planting of gardens and trees at various public buildings and public parks. With only around 5,000 hotel rooms to lodge visitors, several hotels broke ground. Furthermore, the city organized many improvised accommodations, including campgrounds, makeshift dormitories, and converted railcars.

== Great Depression, 1929–1941 ==
In May 1929, a flood caused millions of damage to Houston property.

Houston's population in 1930 was 292,352. Despite the stock market crash, Houston was still building. The Sterling Building was one of a dozen skyscrapers completed in 1930. Yet unemployment was still high and a cause for concern to Mayor Walter Monteith. Modernization of downtown continued in 1931 as two old buildings were razed: The Hotel Brazos and an old house built in 1841 came down at Louisiana and Prairie. Petroleum dominated the landscape of the Houston Ship Channel, not cotton. More dredging east of Harrisburg and new docks at the Turning Basin added to the port's infrastructure. Several local roads were paved around this time. Air travel expanded as new passenger service began from Houston to Atlanta. Despite this economic activity, signs of the Depression included auction sales of four major downtown buildings. In December 1935, floods struck the city, causing over $1 million in property damage and killed as many as six people. Houston and the State of Texas celebrated their centennials in 1936.

Jesse H. Jones led a group of local bankers in 1931 to pool their resources in order to save the weaker banks. This was not enough to prevent the worst part of the Great Depression in 1932 and early 1933, when building activity in the private sector decreased. Federal funding from the Reconstruction Finance Corporation and the Works Progress Administration facilitated major construction projects in the mid-1930s, including assistance for a new Houston City Hall and Lamar High School. Houston International Airport expanded commercial and passenger facilities during the 1930s, while Braniff, Eastern, and Southern airlines all offered regular service by 1941.

== World War II, 1941–1945 ==
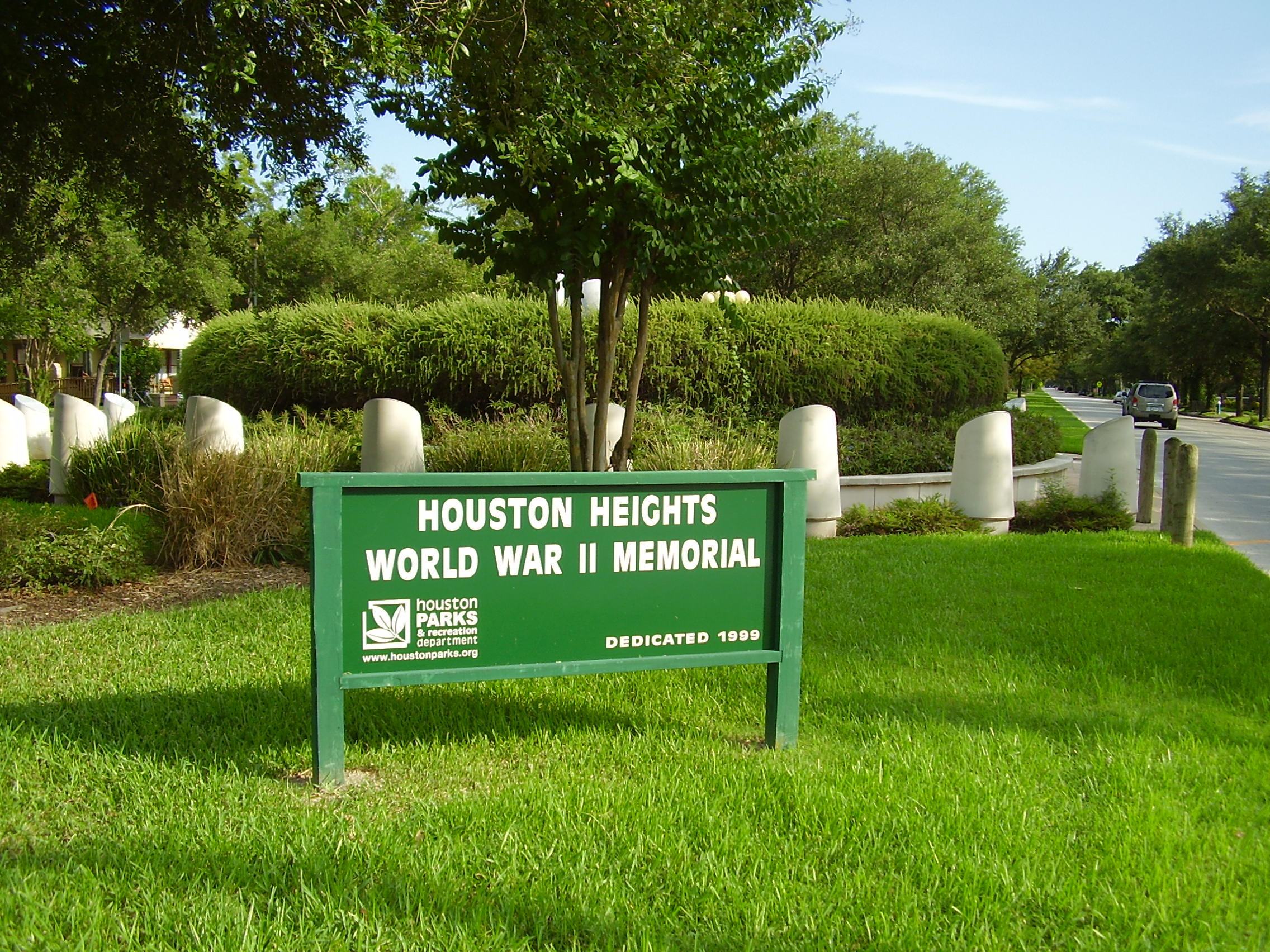
Houston Heights World War II Memorial

Houston increased its production of petrochemicals in the early 1940s and contributed significantly to the US war effort. Shell Oil expedited construction of its Deer Park refinery. In addition to producing the first toluene refined in the US, the Deer Park plant ramped up its production of toluene to ten billion barrels a year. Humble Oil in Houston also refined toluene and produced more than one billion gallons of aviation fuel during World War II. General Tire and Rubber operated a plan in 1943 financed and erected by the federal Defense Plant Corporation, helping to make Houston one of the national leaders in production of synthetic rubber.

In 1942, Mayor Oscar Holcombe convened a meeting at his office at City Hall with trustees of the M.D. Anderson Foundation and other local leaders to facilitate the sale of 134 acres of municipal land to the foundation, which obtained commitments from the Texas Dental School and Baylor Medical School to establish campuses on foundation land adjacent to Hermann Hospital. This was the founding of the Texas Medical Center.

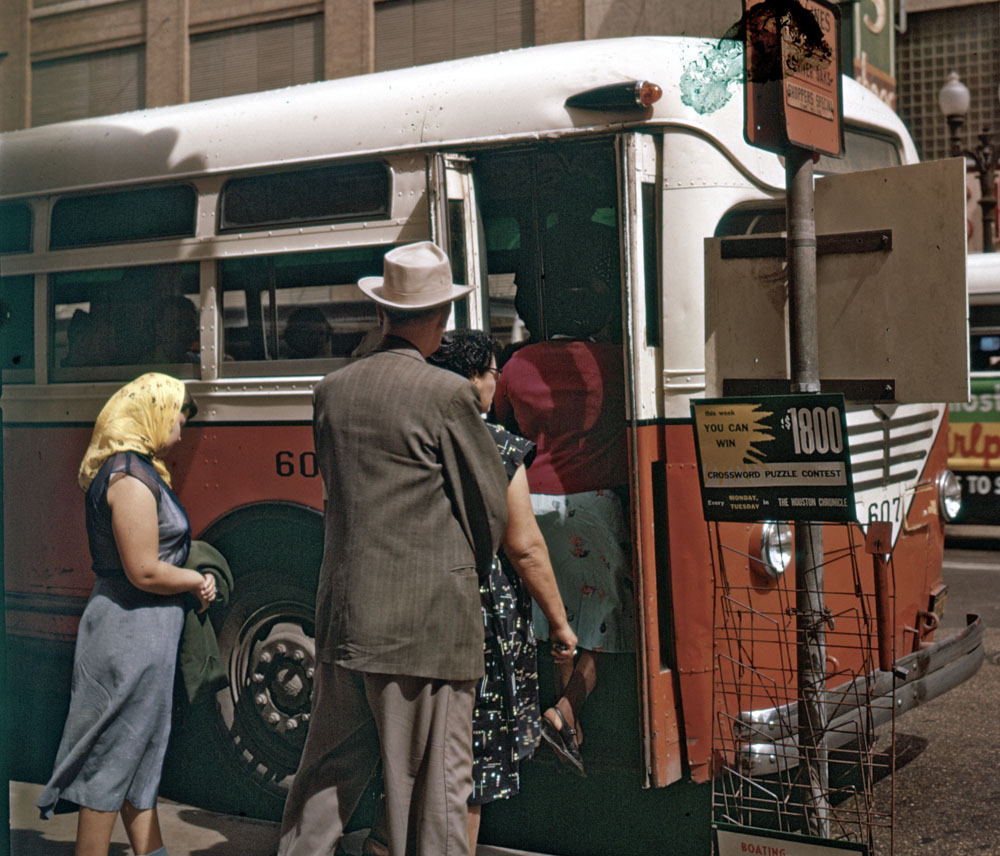
Bus stop in Houston, 1956

== Post-World War II, 1946–1969 ==
In 1946, after the Civil Aeronautics Board chose Houston as a terminal for international air travel, major carriers started flying from Houston to Central America and South America. Throughout the late 1940s, air passenger volume through Houston increased and by 1950, surpassed half a million passengers a year with eight carriers. Houston International Airport opened in 1954, and by 1957 the new airport served over 100,000 passengers monthly.

Following the Federal-Aid Highway Act of 1944, Houston planned a regional interstate highway system, starting with the construction of the Gulf Freeway in 1944. When it was completed in 1952, the Gulf Freeway was the first US freeway completed after World War II. This new transportation infrastructure induced rapid suburban development within the corridor.

During the closing years of World War II, the Texas Medical Center further expanding its geographical footprint when local citizens donated funds for the purchase of a large tract of land from the Hermann Hospital Estate. This was used as the site of the US Naval Hospital on Old Spanish Trail, which opened in 1945. Between 1948 and 1955 several hospitals were added within the footprint of the original Texas Medical Center. This started with the Baylor College of Medicine in 1948 from the design of Hedrick and Lindsley. In successive years, the Texas Medical Center added Houston Methodist Hospital in 1951, followed by Arabia Temple Crippled Children's Hospital, and Texas Children's Hospital. Opened in 1954 were M. D. Anderson Cancer Hospital and St. Luke's Episcopal Hospital. Concluding his period of rapid expansion was the University of Texas School of Dentistry in 1955.

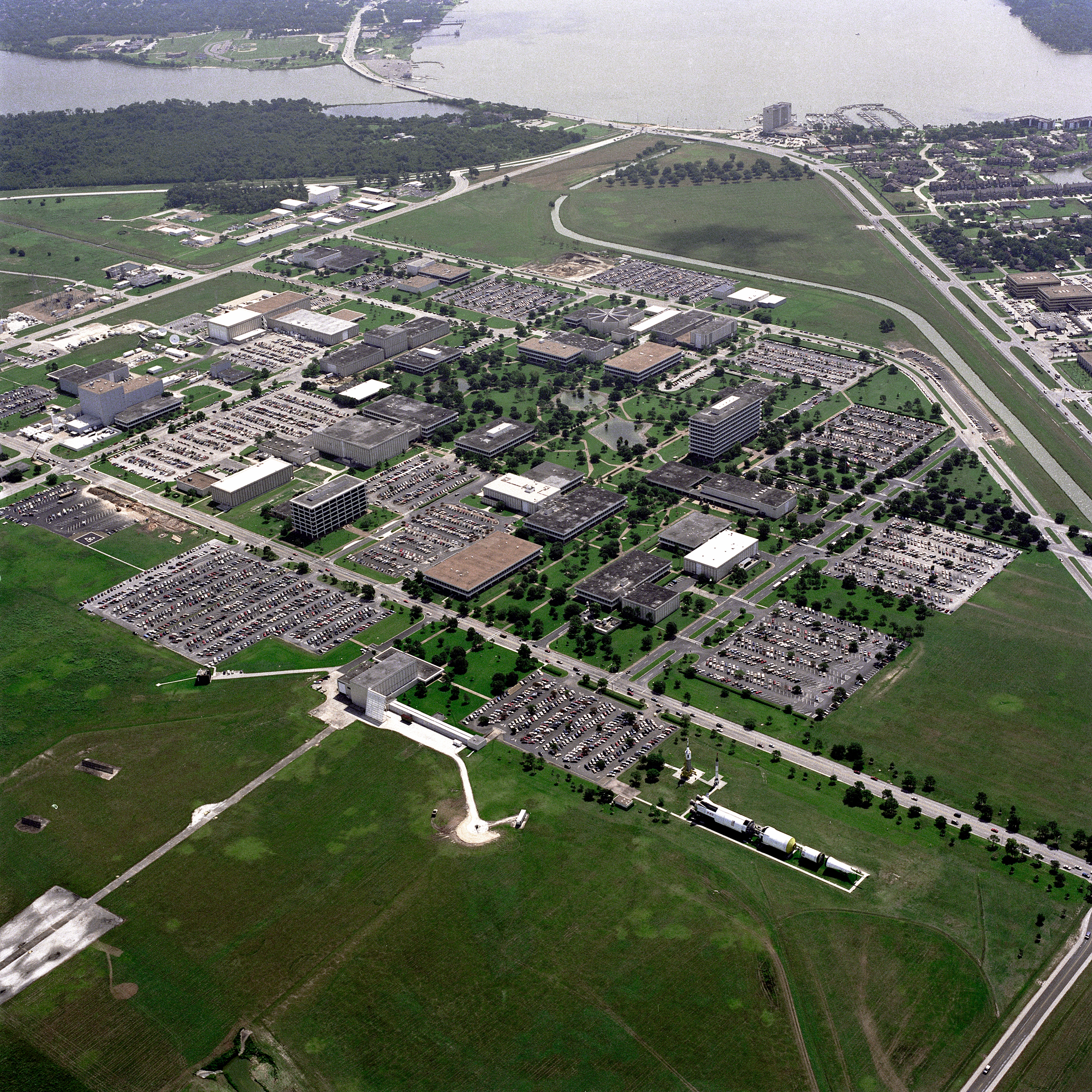
Lyndon B. Johnson Space Center

In 1962, NASA began planning and building the Manned Spacecraft Center in the Clear Lake area, near Ellington Field and the Gulf Freeway. NASA, however, leased the administrative building for the Manned Spacecraft Center at a site on Braes Bayou. NASA developed their own buildings at the Clear Lake site in the following years. Meanwhile, Humble Oil developed subdvisions on nearby land.

September 1961 saw Hurricane Carla, a very destructive hurricane, hit the city.Also in 1962, Houston voters soundly defeated a referendum to implement zoning—the second time in fifteen years. In 1963, the University of Houston ended its status as a private institution and became a state university by entering into the Texas State System of Higher Education after a long battle with opponents from other state universities blocking the change.

In April 1965 the Astrodome opened, under the name of the Harris County Domed Stadium. In July 1965, the Houston metropolitan area was expanded by the inclusion of Brazoria County, Fort Bend County, Liberty County, and Montgomery County. AstroWorld, a theme park adjacent to the Astrodome, opened in 1968. The word Houston was the first word said on the moon by American astronaut, Neil Armstrong, July 20th 1969.

Hattie Mae White was elected to the school board in 1959. She was the first African-American to be elected in a major position in Houston in the 20th Century. Barbara Jordan was elected to the U.S. House of Representatives by Houston residents on November 8, 1966.

While Hobby Airport was already reached its service capacity in the mid-1950s, a new airport required about fifteen years of planning. Jet Era Ranch Corporation acquired a large remote tract of land north of Houston in 1957. Intercontinental Airport opened in 1969 with two terminals based on a hub-and-spoke plan.

== 1970s and integration ==
In the 1970s, the Chinese American community in Houston, which had been relatively small, started growing at a rapid rate.

The Sharpstown scandal, which concerned government bribes involving real estate developer Frank Sharp (neighborhood of Sharpstown is named after him) occurred in 1970 and 1971.

One Shell Plaza and Two Shell Plaza were completed in 1971. One Shell Plaza was the tallest building west of the Mississippi River.

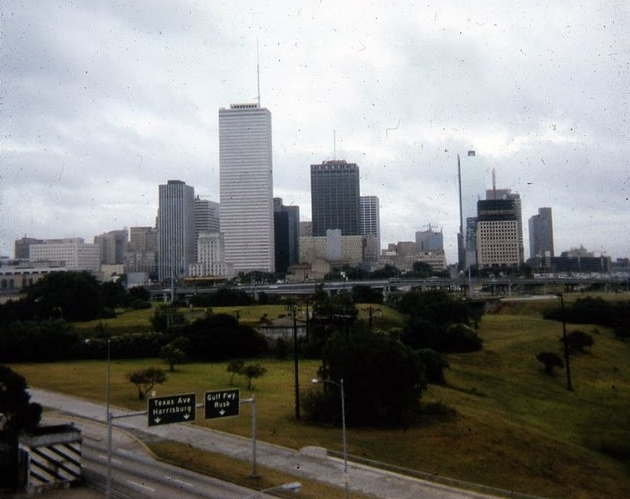
Skyline in 1971 after completion of One Shell Plaza

Because the Houston Independent School District was slow to desegregate public schools, on June 1, 1970, the Federal officials struck the HISD plan down and forced it to adopt zoning laws. This was 16 years after the landmark Supreme Court ruling in Brown v. Board of Education, which determined that segregated schools were inherently unequal. Racial tensions over integration of the schools continued. Some Hispanic Americans felt they were being discriminated against when they were being put with only African-Americans as part of the desegregation plan, so many took their children out of the schools and put them in huelgas, or protest schools, until a ruling in 1973 satisfied their demands.

The Third Ward became the center for the African American community in the city. By 1979 African Americans were elected to the city council for the first time since Reconstruction. During the time period, five African Americans served on city council.

Water pollution of the Houston Ship Channel became notorious in 1972. Work on the Texas Commerce Tower, now the JPMorgan Chase Tower, began in 1979.

The late 1970s saw a population boom thanks to the Arab Oil Embargo. People from the Rust Belt states moved into Houston, at a rate of over 1,000 a week, mostly from Michigan, and are still moving to Houston to this day.

The city made changes in higher education. The Houston Community College system was established in 1972 by HISD. In 1977, the University of Houston celebrated its 50th anniversary as the Texas Legislature established the University of Houston System—a state system of higher education that includes and governs four universities. In 1976, Howard Hughes, at one time the world's richest man, died on his jet heading to Houston. He was born in Humble, Texas, the home of what is now ExxonMobil.

== 1980s–1990s ==
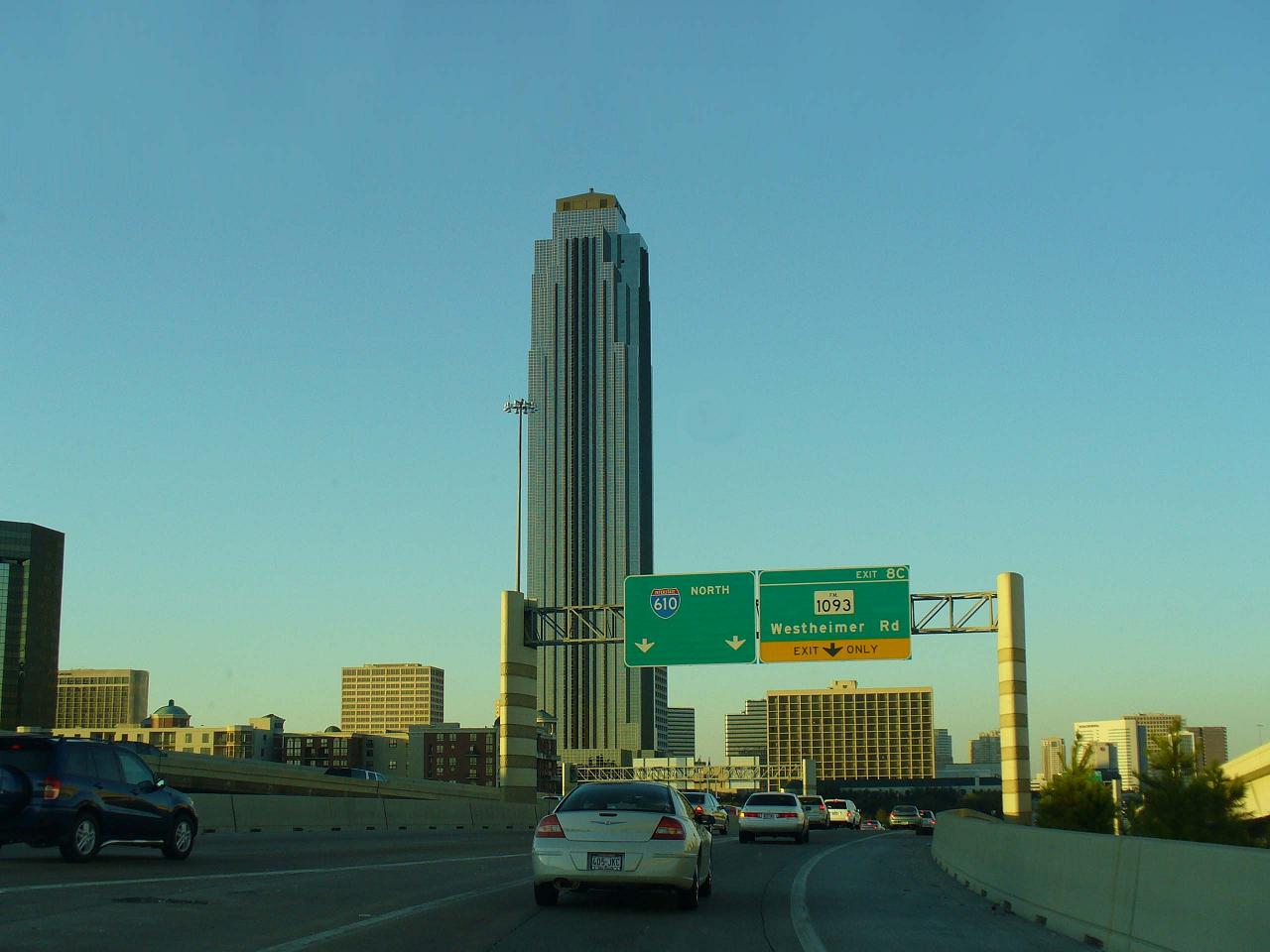
The Transco Tower as viewed in 2006 from the direct connector to I-610 North (more recently known as Williams Tower)

In 1981, Kathryn J. Whitmire became the city's first female mayor, holding that position for 10 years; after she left office, term limits were enacted to prevent future mayors from serving for more than 6 years. Several new construction projects, including The Park Shopping Mall, the Allied Bank Tower, the Gulf Tower and several other buildings were being carried out in downtown. The Transco Tower, the tallest building in the world outside of a central business district, was completed in 1983. METRO wanted to build a rail system connecting the city with the suburbs, but the plan was rejected by voters on June 11, 1983. Voters did, however, approve plans for the George R. Brown Convention Center. In August 1983, the University of Houston changed its name to "University of Houston–University Park" in order to separate its identity from other universities in the University of Houston System; however, the name was reverted to University of Houston in 1991. On August 18, 1983, Hurricane Alicia struck Galveston and Houston, causing $2 billion in damage.

Houston's massive population boom was reversed when oil prices fell in 1986, leading to several years of recession for the Houston economy. The space industry also took a blow that year with the Challenger disaster in Florida. The first nine months of 1987 saw the closure of eleven banks, but also the opening of several cultural centers including the George R. Brown Convention Center, the Wortham Theatre, and the Menil Collection. On August 7, 1988, Congressman Mickey Leland died in a plane crash in Ethiopia. On October 3, a Phillips 66 plant exploded in adjacent Pasadena, killing 23 and injuring 130 people. The Houston Zoo began charging admission fees for the first time in 1988.

The year 1990 saw the opening of Houston Intercontinental Airport's new 12-gate Mickey Leland International Airlines terminal, named after the recently deceased Houston congressman. In 1991 Sakowitz stores shut down; the Sakowitz brothers had brought their original store from Galveston to Houston in 1911. August 10, 1991 saw a redrawing of districts for city council, so that minority groups could be better represented in the city council. 1993 saw the G8 visiting to discuss world issues, and zoning was defeated for a third time by voters in November.

The master-planned community of Kingwood was forcibly annexed in 1996, angering many of its residents who often call it the "Houston Anschluss". The annexation put Kingwood in the jurisdiction of Houston's fire and police services, but it did not alter school district boundaries nor did it change postal addresses and postal services.

Rod Paige became superintendent of Houston Independent School District in 1994; during his seven-year tenure the district became very well known for high test scores, and in 2001 Paige was asked to become U.S. Secretary of Education for the new George W. Bush administration. Lee P. Brown, Houston's first African-American mayor, was elected in 1997.

== Early 21st century ==
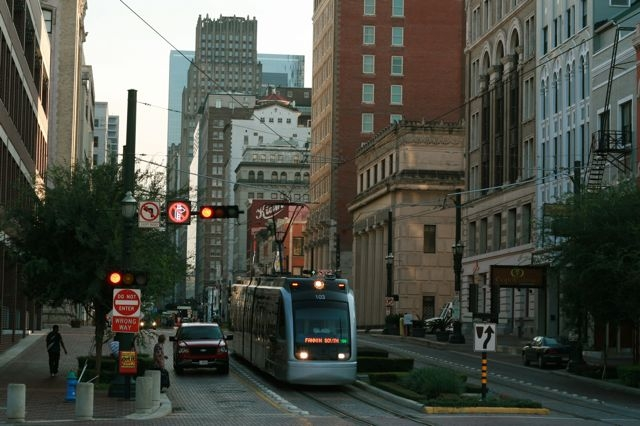
Houston light rail train traveling north, approaching the Main Street viaduct

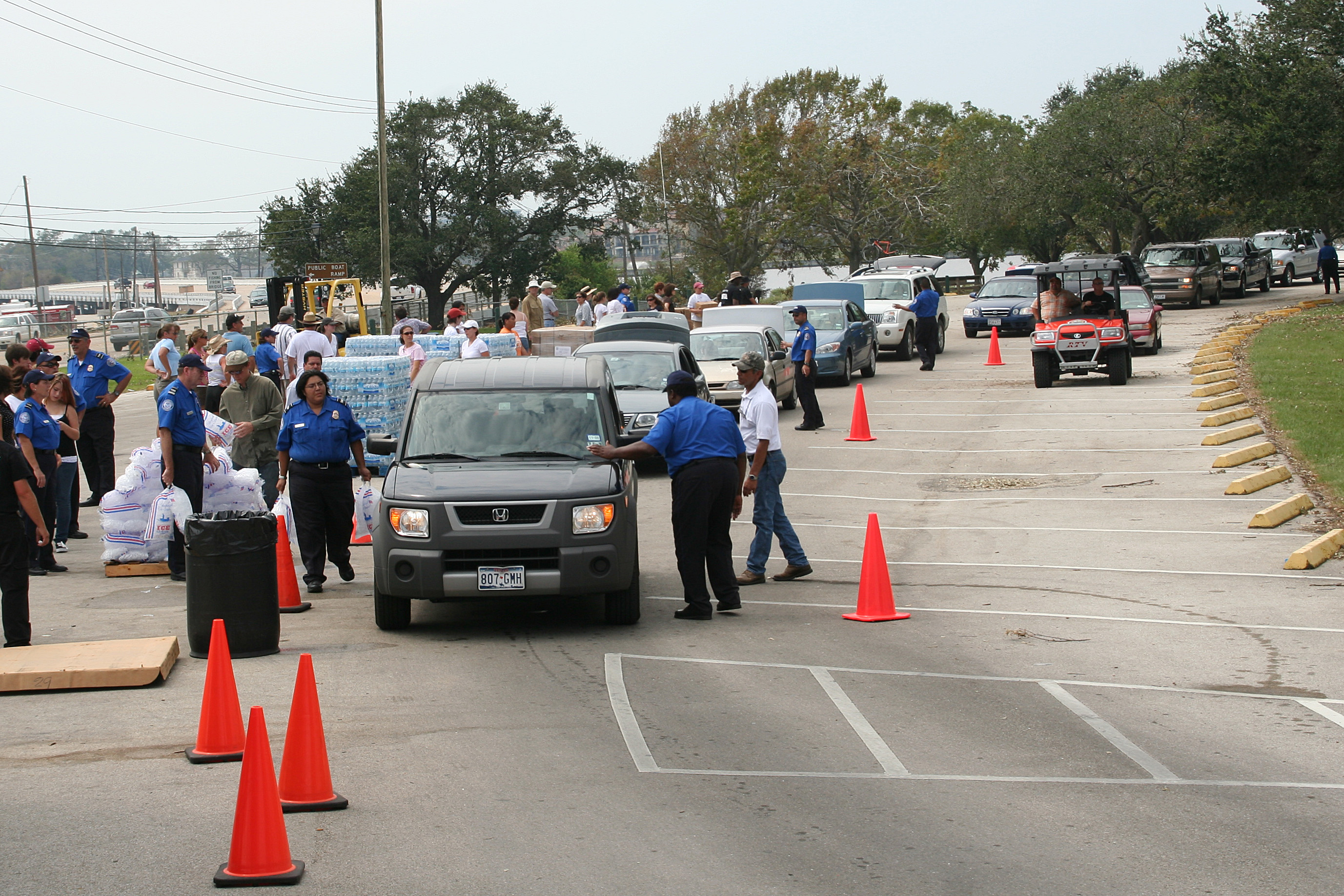
Cars queuing at a Hurricane Ike relief center, September 19, 2008

The city's major sports teams were using outdated stadiums and threatened to leave. Eventually, in 1996, the Houston Oilers did so after several threats. The city built Enron Field (now Daikin Park) for the Houston Astros. Reliant Stadium was erected for the NFL expansion team Houston Texans.

Tropical Storm Allison devastated many neighborhoods as well as interrupted all services within the Texas medical center for several months with flooding in June 2001. At least 17 people were killed around the Houston area when the rainfall from Allison that fell on June 8 and 9 caused the city's bayous to rise over their banks.

In October 2001 Enron, a Houston-based energy company, got caught in accounting scandals, ultimately leading to collapse of the company and its accounting firm Arthur Andersen, and the arrest and imprisonment of several executives.

In 2002, the University of Houston celebrated its 75th anniversary with an enrollment surpassing 32,000 students. The flagship campus at that time had expanded to include the Texas Center for Superconductivity, the Texas Learning and Computation Center, the Arte Publico Press, and the Moore's Opera House. Among the university's satellite campuses at that time was University of Houston-Downtown.

The new international Terminal E at George Bush Intercontinental Airport opened with 30 gates in 2003.

The Toyota Center, the arena for the Houston Rockets opened in fall 2003.

METRO put in light rail service on January 1, 2004. Voters have decided by a close margin (52% Yes to 48% No) that METRO's light rail shall be expanded.

In 2004, the Mayor of the city was Bill White and Houston unveiled the first Mahatma Gandhi statue in the state of Texas at Hermann Park. Houston's Indian American Community were cheerful after 10 years, in 2010, when the Hillcroft and Harwin area were renamed Mahatma Gandhi District in honor of Mohandas Karamchand Gandhi as that area is the center of Indian commerce.

In the aftermath of the Hurricane Katrina disaster, about 200,000 New Orleans residents resettled in Houston. Soon following Katrina was Hurricane Rita, a category 5 hurricane which caused 2.5 million Houstonians to evacuate the city, the largest urban evacuation in the history of the U.S.

Six Flags AstroWorld, Houston's only large theme park, closed in 2005.

Three major projects greatly expanded the geographical reach and service capacity of the Texas Medical Center in the early twenty-first century. First, the Baylor College of Medicine shifted its affiliation from Houston Methodist Hospital to St. Luke's Episcopal Hospital, while planning a new 35-acre campus. Since both Baylor College of Medicine and the Episcopal Diocese of Texas were struggling to finance all their medical facilities in Houston, the diocese sold St. Luke's Hospital in Houston to Catholic Health Initiatives. This better funded non-profit acquired a partial share in the ownership of the partly finished Baylor McNair Campus, which opened in 2015. In the 2010s, Houston Methodist constructed annexes in the core of the Texas Medical Center. The largest of these hospital expansions is the twenty-six story outpatient center, with a distinctive nautical design. Another major addition to the Texas Medical Center is a Houston branch of the Menninger Clinic, a 120-bed psychiatric hospital on Main Street.

By 2008, the widening of I-10 was taking place, and eventually incorporated toll lanes. Also, Discovery Green park was created.

In January 2010, Annise Parker became the first openly gay mayor of a large American city upon her inauguration as Houston's mayor.

Memorial Day storms in 2015 brought flash flooding to the city as some areas received 11 inches or more of rain overnight, exacerbated by already full bayous. At least three people died and more than 1,000 cars were stranded on highways and overpasses. In April 2016, historic flooding came to Houston which has killed 5 people. In August 2017, Houston experienced record flooding as a result of Hurricane Harvey. It caused $125 billion in damage, making it one of three tropical cyclones to cause over $100 billion in damages, along with Ian and Katrina.

== See also ==
- Allen Ranch, occupied much of modern Houston and was an early driver of city's growth
- History of the Mexican-Americans in Houston
- List of mayors of Houston
- Timeline of Houston
- History of African Americans in Houston
