= Beaconsfield (disambiguation) =

Beaconsfield is a town in Buckinghamshire, England.

Beaconsfield may also refer to:

== Places ==
=== Australia ===
- Beaconsfield, Sydney, New South Wales
- Beaconsfield, Queensland, a town in the Mackay Region, Queensland, Australia
- Beaconsfield, Tasmania, a town
- Beaconsfield, Victoria, a suburb in Melbourne, Victoria
  - Beaconsfield railway station, Melbourne
- Beaconsfield, Western Australia, a suburb of Perth

=== Canada ===
- Beaconsfield, Ontario
- Beaconsfield, Quebec, a city on the Island of Montreal
  - Beaconsfield station (Exo), a train station in the city

=== South Africa ===
- Beaconsfield, Kimberley

=== United Kingdom ===
- Beaconsfield (district), a former local government district of Buckinghamshire

=== United States ===
- Beaconsfield (Houston), a NRHP-listed apartment building
- Beaconsfield, Iowa
- Beaconsfield station (MBTA), in Brookline, Massachusetts

== Other uses ==
- Beaconsfield (film), a 2012 Australian television film
- Beaconsfield (gallery), an art gallery in Vauxhall
- Beaconsfield (UK Parliament constituency)
- Beaconsfield (House of Assembly of South Africa constituency)
- Earl of Beaconsfield, created in 1876 for Prime Minister Benjamin Disraeli

== See also ==
- Beaconsfield Mine collapse, a 2006 mine collapse in Tasmania
- Beaconsfield station (disambiguation)
