= Beaconsfield station =

Beaconsfield station may refer to:

- Beaconsfield station (MBTA) in Brookline, Massachusetts, United States
- Beaconsfield station (Exo) in Montreal, Quebec, Canada
- Beaconsfield railway station (England) in Beaconsfield, Buckinghamshire, England
- Beaconsfield railway station, Melbourne, in Melbourne, Victoria, Australia
- Beaconsfield Station Sheep Wash, in Ilfracombe, Queensland, Australia

== See also ==
- Beaconsfield (disambiguation)
