= Constitution (1829 steamboat) =

American-owned steamship

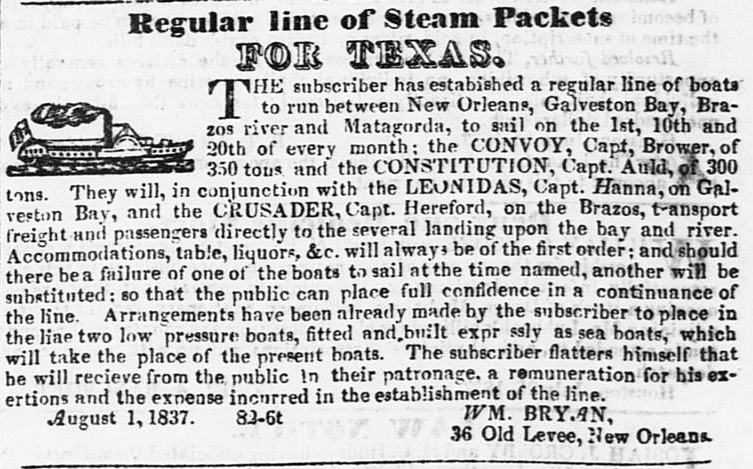

History
- Name: Constitution
- Owner: Sloo & Byrne, William Bryan (or Byrne)
- Operator: Captain Edward Auld
- Port of registry: New Orleans
- Route: New Orleans, Galveston, Texas, mouth of the Brazos River, Matagorda, Texas
- Completed: 1829
- Out of service: June 1840
- Fate: Stranded at Matagorda, Texas

General characteristics
- Tonnage: 262
- Length: 150 ft (46 m)
- Draft: About 7.5 ft (2.3 m)
- Propulsion: Steam-powered sidewheeler

Constitution is a former steamboat which operated in the Republic of Texas.

Constitution is a former steamboat, registered in New Orleans, but it primarily serviced the ports within the Republic of Texas. The steamer was 262 tons and 150-feet long. Constitution was designed as a riverboat, and built at a yard in Cincinnati in 1829. It had a draft of seven feet and seven inches.

Augustus Chapman Allen and John Kirby Allen—the original developers of Houston—commissioned Constitution for a demonstration voyage to prove the navigability of Buffalo Bayou as far as their new town site. They had already dispatched the Laura for the same purpose, but detractors of the Houston town site objected that a truer test would be a much larger ship. The Allen brothers accepted the challenge. They hired Captain Edward Auld to pilot the steamer from Galveston to Houston for $1,000. He successfully navigated Constitution through Buffalo Bayou and docked in Houston on 1 June 1837. However, unable to turn the steamer around at Houston, the captain ran the engines in reverse for six-and-a-half miles, turning it about at a wide segment of the bayou now named for the steamship and the event: Constitution Bend.

Auld did not take Constitution up Buffalo Bayou again. Instead, he offered monthly packet service between Galveston and New Orleans. He ran it aground in January 1838 near Sabine Pass, Texas, though the steamer limped into Galveston for repairs. Francis Cynric Sheridan remarked in his journal that a steamer named Constitution was used for lightering freight and passengers from his brig, passing through shallow waters to gain access to Galveston Island.
