= Brookline Hills station =

Light rail station in Brookline, Massachusetts, US

Brookline Hills
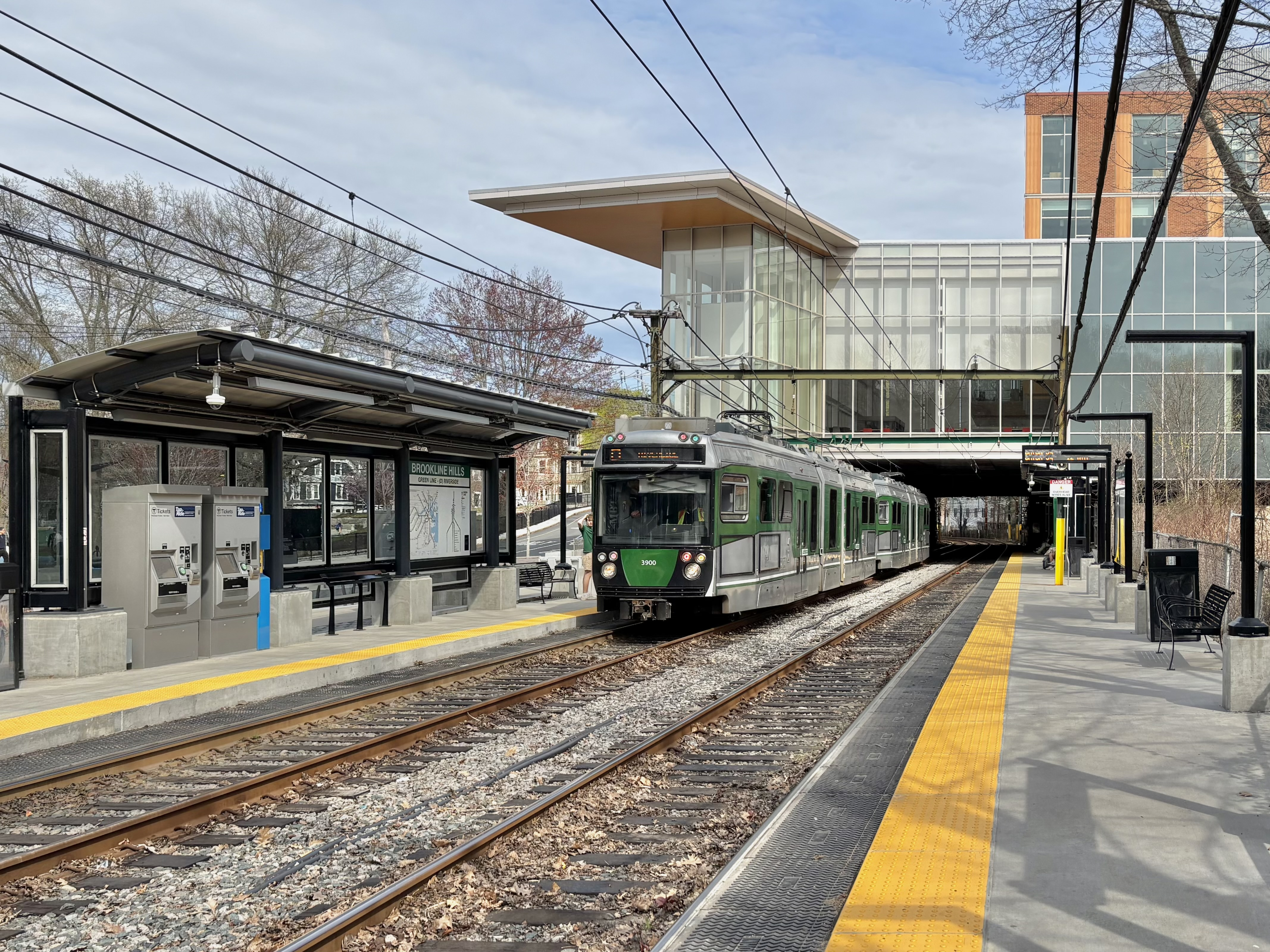
- An outbound train at Brookline Hills station in April 2025

General information
- Location: Tappan Street at Cypress Street; Brookline, Massachusetts
- Coordinates: 42.33132°N 71.12675°W
- Line: Highland branch
- Platforms: 2 side platforms
- Tracks: 2
- Connections: MBTA bus: 60

Construction
- Parking: 9 spaces
- Cycle facilities: 6 spaces
- Accessible: Yes

History
- Opened: July 4, 1959
- Rebuilt: September 25, 2019–January 8, 2022

Passengers
- 2013: 1,225 daily boardings

Services
Preceding station	MBTA	Following station
Beaconsfield toward Riverside	Green Line D branch	Brookline Village toward Union Square
Former services
Preceding station	New York Central Railroad	Following station
Beaconsfield toward Riverside	Highland branch	Brookline Village toward Boston
Location

Brookline Hills station is a light rail stop on the Green Line D branch of the MBTA subway system, located in the Brookline Hills neighborhood of Brookline, Massachusetts. The station has two side platforms serving the line's two tracks. Brookline Hills station is accessible, with raised platforms to accommodate low-floor light rail vehicles.

== History ==
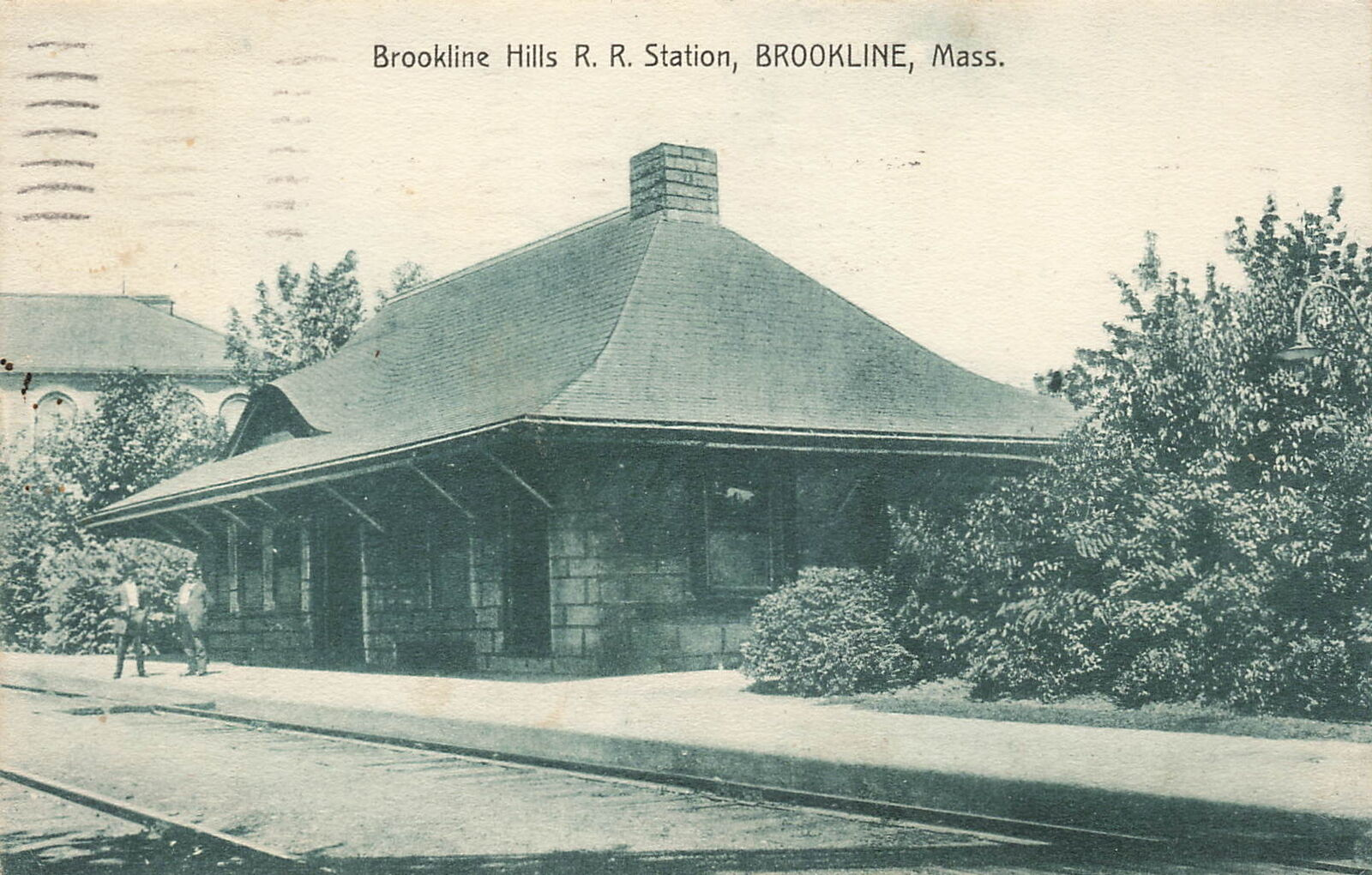
The Shepley, Rutan, and Coolidge depot pictured on an early postcard

The Brookline Branch of the Boston and Worcester Railroad was extended west to Newton Upper Falls by the Charles River Branch Railroad in November 1852. Cypress Street station – later Brookline Hills – was added after 1858.

After 1886, loop service was run on the Highland branch via what is now the Framingham/Worcester Line, and later via the Needham Line. In March 1892, a new station designed by Shepley, Rutan and Coolidge was opened.

The station agent was removed in May 1949, but the station building remained in use as shelter for passengers. The final trains on the line ran on May 31, 1958. The line was converted to light rail by the M.T.A. and Brookline Hills reopened on July 4, 1959, along with the rest of the D branch. The 1892 depot is no longer extant.

=== Accessibility ===
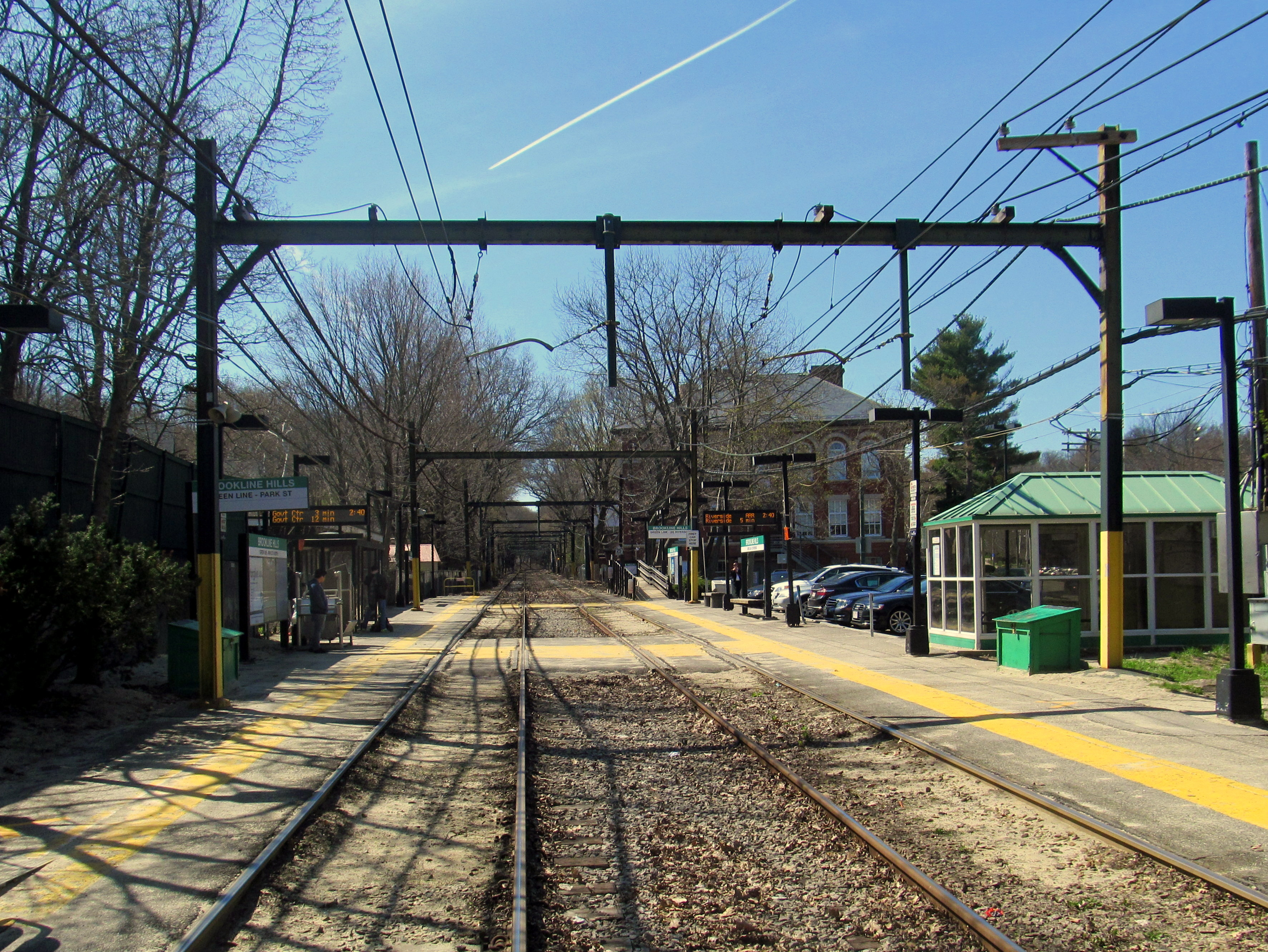
The station in 2016, prior to reconstruction

In the early 2000s, the MBTA modified key surface stops with raised platforms for accessibility. Brookline Hills was not among those initially outfitted with portable lifts, nor was it retrofitted with raised platforms. However, portable lifts were installed by 2003.

Around 2006, the MBTA added wooden mini-high platforms on both platforms, allowing level boarding on older Type 7 LRVs. These platforms were installed at eight Green Line stations in 2006–07 as part of the settlement of Joanne Daniels-Finegold, et al. v. MBTA.

The station was reconstructed with fully accessible platforms as part of an expansion of Brookline High School, which included a new school building partially over the eastern end of the platforms. Modification of the overhead contact system took place from September 25, 2019, to March 8, 2020. Platform modification began around May 2020; the station closed on April 12, 2021 for the final phase of work. The station reopened on January 8, 2022.
