= Hattie Mae Whiting White =

American politician

- Born: May 22, 1916; Huntsville, Texas
- Died: July 30, 1993 (aged 77); Houston, Texas
- Occupation(s): Educator, politician
- Known for: First Black member of the Houston Independent School District board (1958-1967)

Hattie Mae Whiting White (May 22, 1916 – July 30, 1993) was an American educator and politician. As the first Black member of the Houston Independent School District's board in 1958, she was also the city's first Black elected official in the 20th century.

== Early life and education ==
Hattie Mae Whiting was born in Huntsville, Texas, the daughter of David Wendell Whiting and Hattie Gooden Whiting. She was raised in Houston, where she attended Booker T. Washington High School and Houston Colored Junior College, and trained as a teacher at Prairie View State Normal & Industrial College.

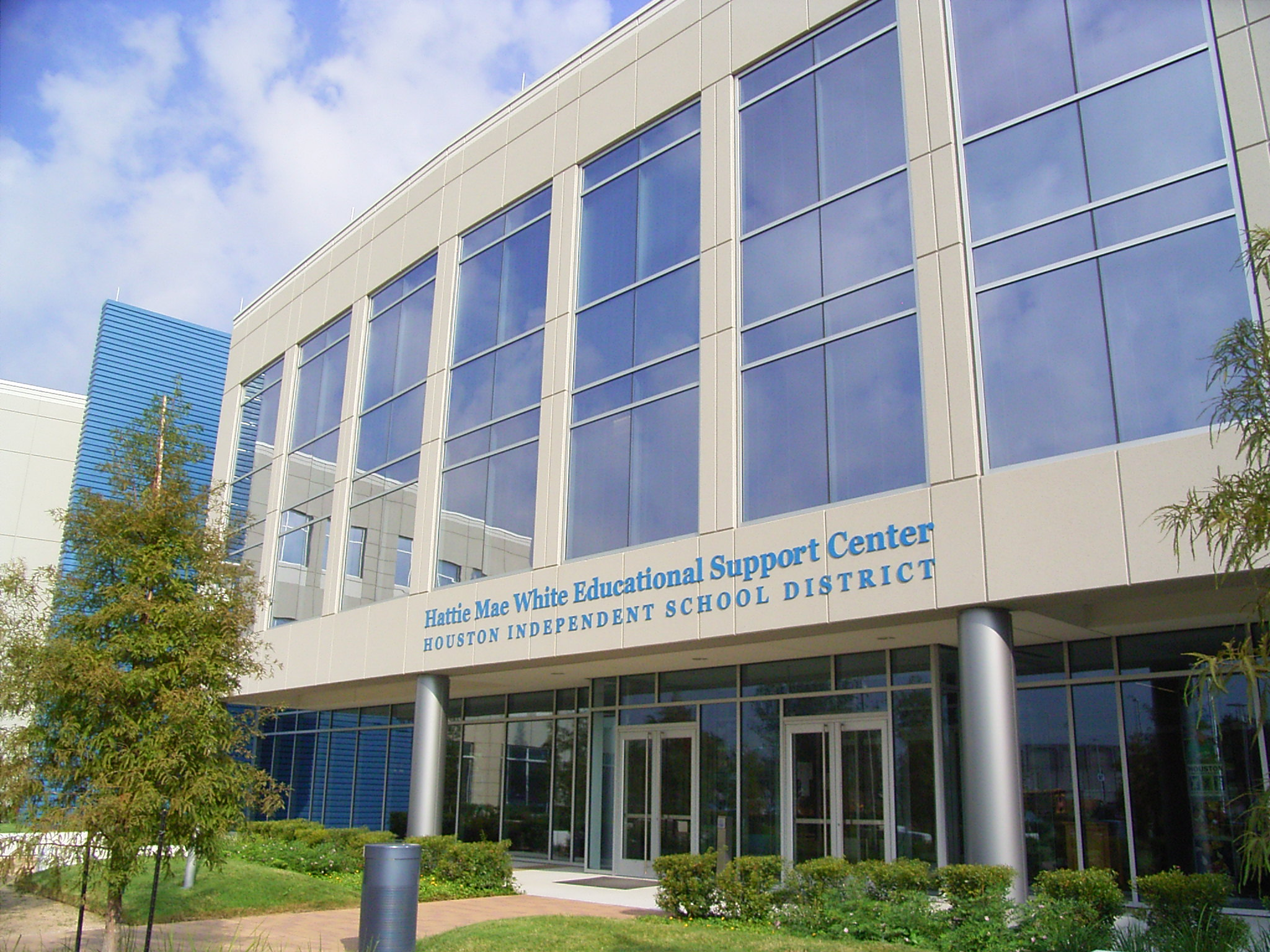
The Hattie Mae White Educational Support Center in Houston

== Career ==
Whiting taught school until she married in 1941. She served on the Metropolitan Council of the Houston YWCA, and the Houston Association for Better Schools. In 1958, White was elected to the Houston Independent School District (HISD) board, as its first Black member, and as the city's first Black elected official since Reconstruction.

Despite controversy and violent racist threats, White was outspoken in favor of school desegregation and federal funding programs, and was re-elected in 1961 and 1964. She was defeated for re-election in 1967, and in a run for the Texas legislature in 1968. White returned to schoolwork after her political career, and retired from teaching in 1986. In 1985, she gave an oral history interview to Jon Schwartz, for the documentary This is Our Home It is Not For Sale; the video is now in the audio/video collection of the University of Houston.

White was honored with the Houston YWCA's Lifetime Achievement Award. The HISD administration building was named for her, and the current Hattie Mae White Educational Support Center was named in her memory in 2006.

== Personal life ==
Hattie Whiting married optometrist Charles E. White in 1941. They had five children together. She died in 1993, aged 77 years, in Houston.
