= Beaconsfield (Houston) =

Historic building in Houston, Texas, U.S.

- U.S. National Register of Historic Places
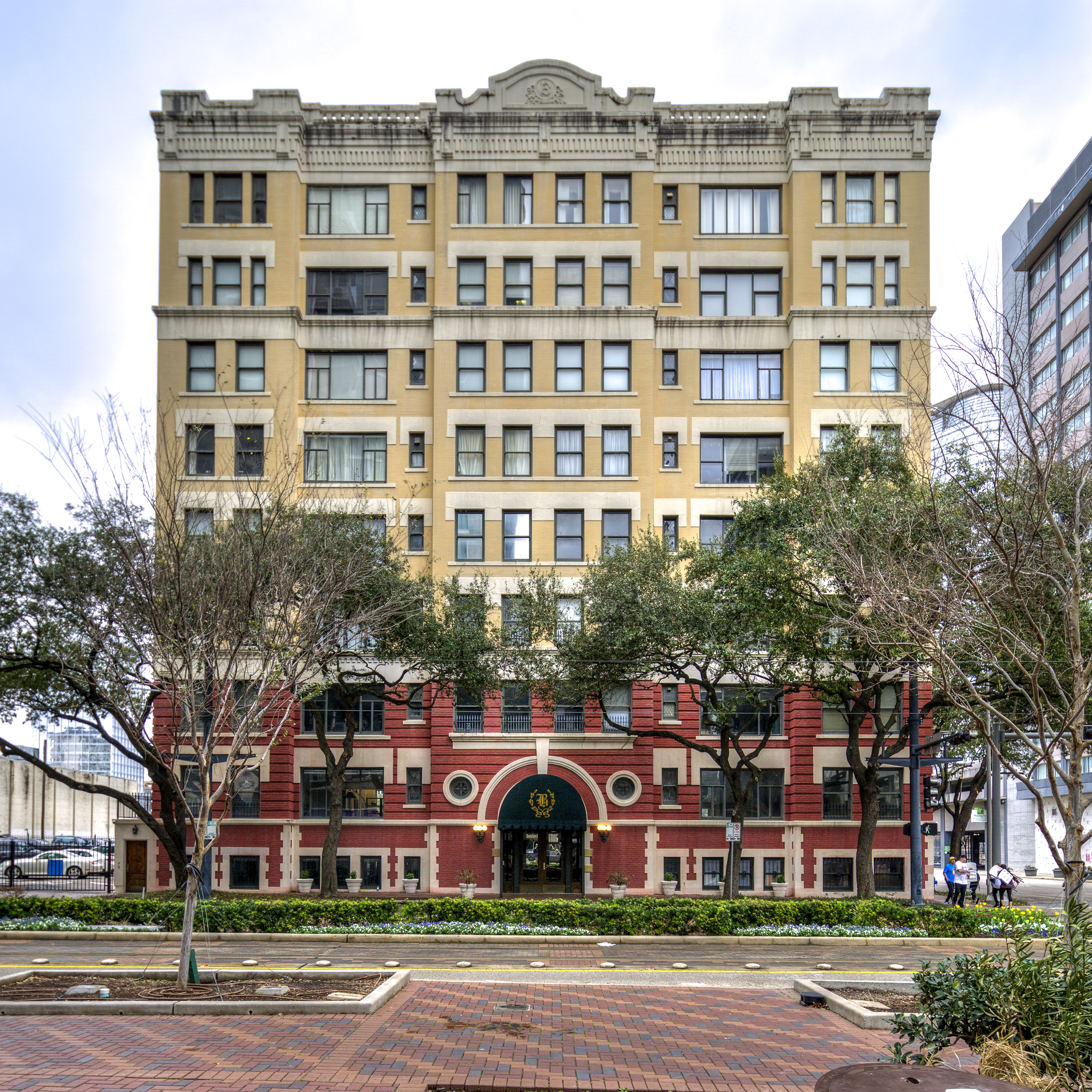

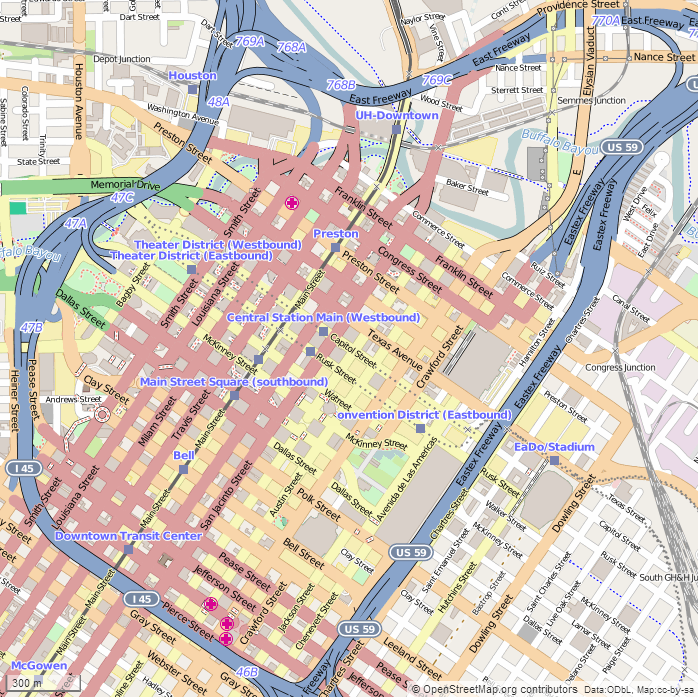
- Location within Houston Downtown Location within Texas Location within the United States
- Location: 1700 Main St., Houston, Texas
- Coordinates: 29°45′20″N 95°22′21″W
- Area: less than one acre
- Built: 1911
- Architect: Pigg, Alonzo
- NRHP reference No.: 83004428
- Added to NRHP: March 29, 1983

The Beaconsfield is an apartment building located on Main Street at Pease Street in Downtown Houston. The building is listed on the National Register of Historic Places.

The Beaconsfield was designed as an apartment building by local architect Alonzo C. Pigg. Lamb-Field Company started construction in December 1910 and completed the building in 1911. The eight-story building housed just sixteen apartments, each with "two screened balconies and six large rooms with fireplaces." Building amenities included servants quarters, elevators, back stairways, and parking.

== See also ==
- National Register of Historic Places listings in Harris County, Texas
