= Beaconsfield station (MBTA) =

Light rail station in Brookline, Massachusetts, US

Beaconsfield
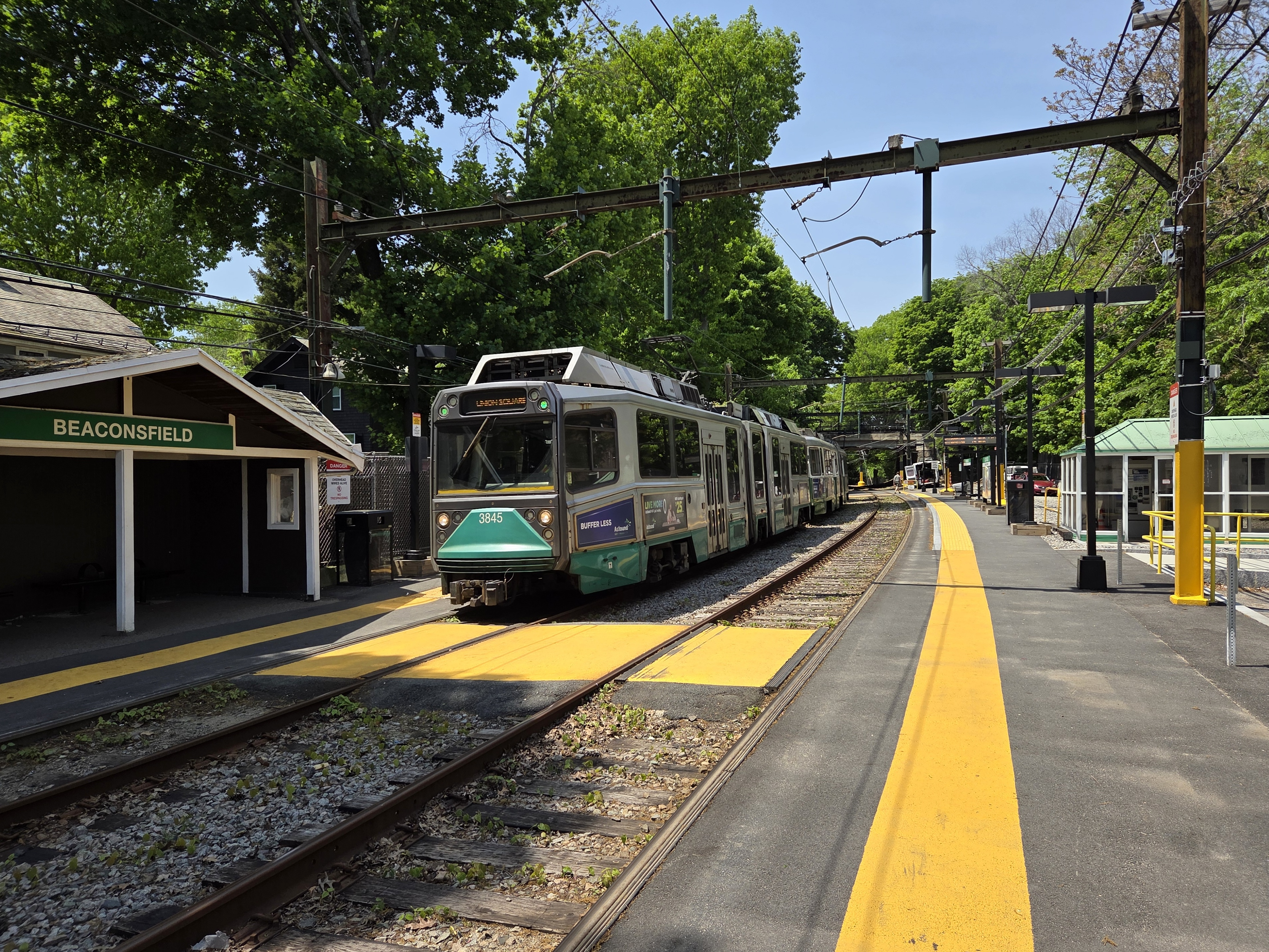
- An inbound train at Beaconsfield station in 2026

General information
- Location: Beaconsfield Road east of Dean Road; Brookline, Massachusetts
- Coordinates: 42.33581°N 71.14060°W
- Line: Highland branch
- Platforms: 2 side platforms
- Tracks: 2

Construction
- Parking: 11 spaces
- Cycle facilities: 8 spaces
- Accessible: Yes

History
- Opened: February 1, 1907 (original station); July 4, 1959 (modern station)
- Closed: May 31, 1958
- Rebuilt: October 2024; additional work planned

Passengers
- 2011: 1,075 daily boardings

Services
Preceding station	MBTA	Following station
Reservoir toward Riverside	Green Line D branch	Brookline Hills toward Union Square
Former services
Preceding station	New York Central Railroad	Following station
Reservoir toward Riverside	Highland branch	Brookline Hills toward Boston
Location

Beaconsfield station is an MBTA light rail station in Brookline, Massachusetts. It serves the Green Line D branch. It is located off Dean Road and Beaconsfield Road just south of Beacon Street. Like the other stops on the line, it was a commuter rail station on the Boston and Albany Railroad's Highland branch until 1958, when the line was closed and converted to a branch of what is now the Green Line. The station reopened along with the rest of the line in 1959. Beaconsfield was made accessible in October 2024; additional reconstruction is planned.

== History ==
=== B&A station ===
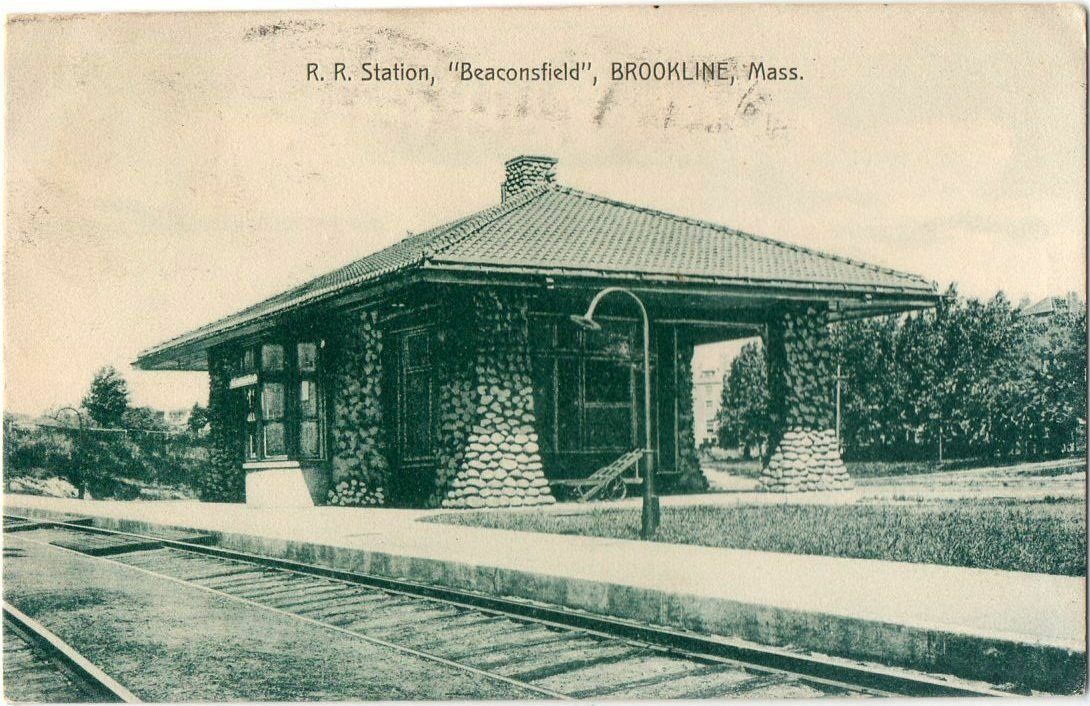
1910 postcard of Beaconsfield station

The Boston and Worcester Railroad opened a 1.4-mile (2.3 km) branch from Brookline Junction to Brookline on April 10, 1848. The Charles River Branch Railroad extended the Brookline branch to Newton Upper Falls in November 1852 and to Needham in June 1853. The Boston and Albany Railroad bought back the line, then part of the New York and New England Railroad, in February 1883. It was double-tracked and extended to the B&A main at Riverside; "Newton Circuit" service via the Highland branch and the main line began on May 16, 1886.

There was not originally a station on the line at Dean Road. In late 1906, transit magnate Henry Melville Whitney built a new station to serve his nearby Beaconsfield Hotel. Work on the station began in October 1906 by the firm of Benjamin Fox. It was built in a heavy stone style similar to the Richardsonian Romanesque stations constructed elsewhere on the B&A system in the previous two decades. By November, the masonry was largely complete, the roof ready for tile, and the granolithic floor and 330-foot (100 m) platform ready to be poured. The platform was poured in December 1906. The new station opened on February 1, 1907.

=== Conversion to light rail service ===
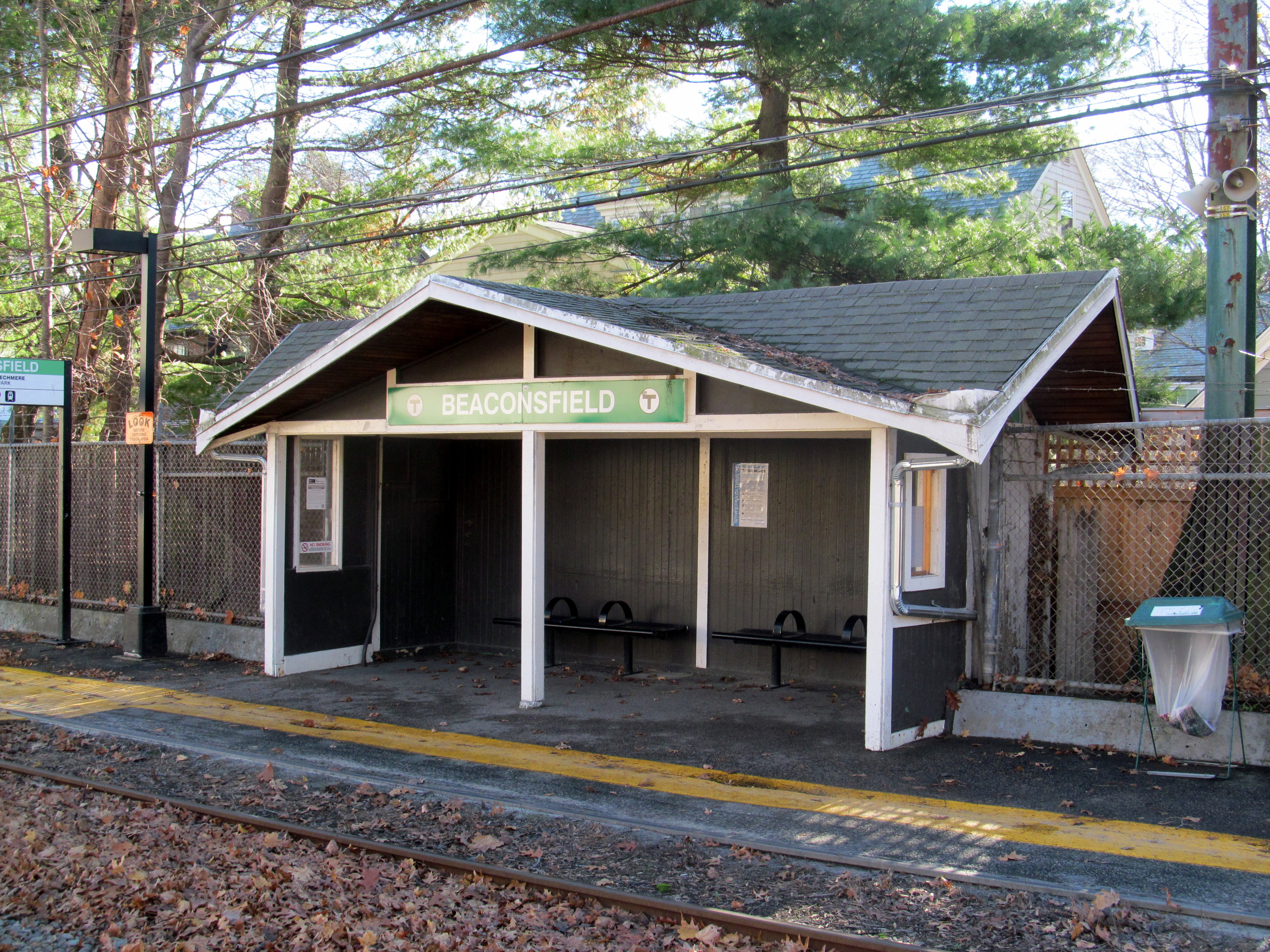
1959-built shelter at the station

In June 1957, the Massachusetts Legislature approved the purchase of the branch by the M.T.A. from the nearly-bankrupt New York Central Railroad for conversion to a trolley line. Service ended on May 31, 1958. The line was quickly converted for trolley service, and the line including Beaconsfield station reopened on July 4, 1959. The 1906-built station was torn down to build a parking lot; a small wooden shelter was built on the inbound platform.

The M.T.A. was folded into the Massachusetts Bay Transportation Authority (MBTA) in August 1964. A heated shelter for fare machines on the outbound side was added around 2006, though no substantial modifications were made to the station until the 2020s.

=== Accessibility ===
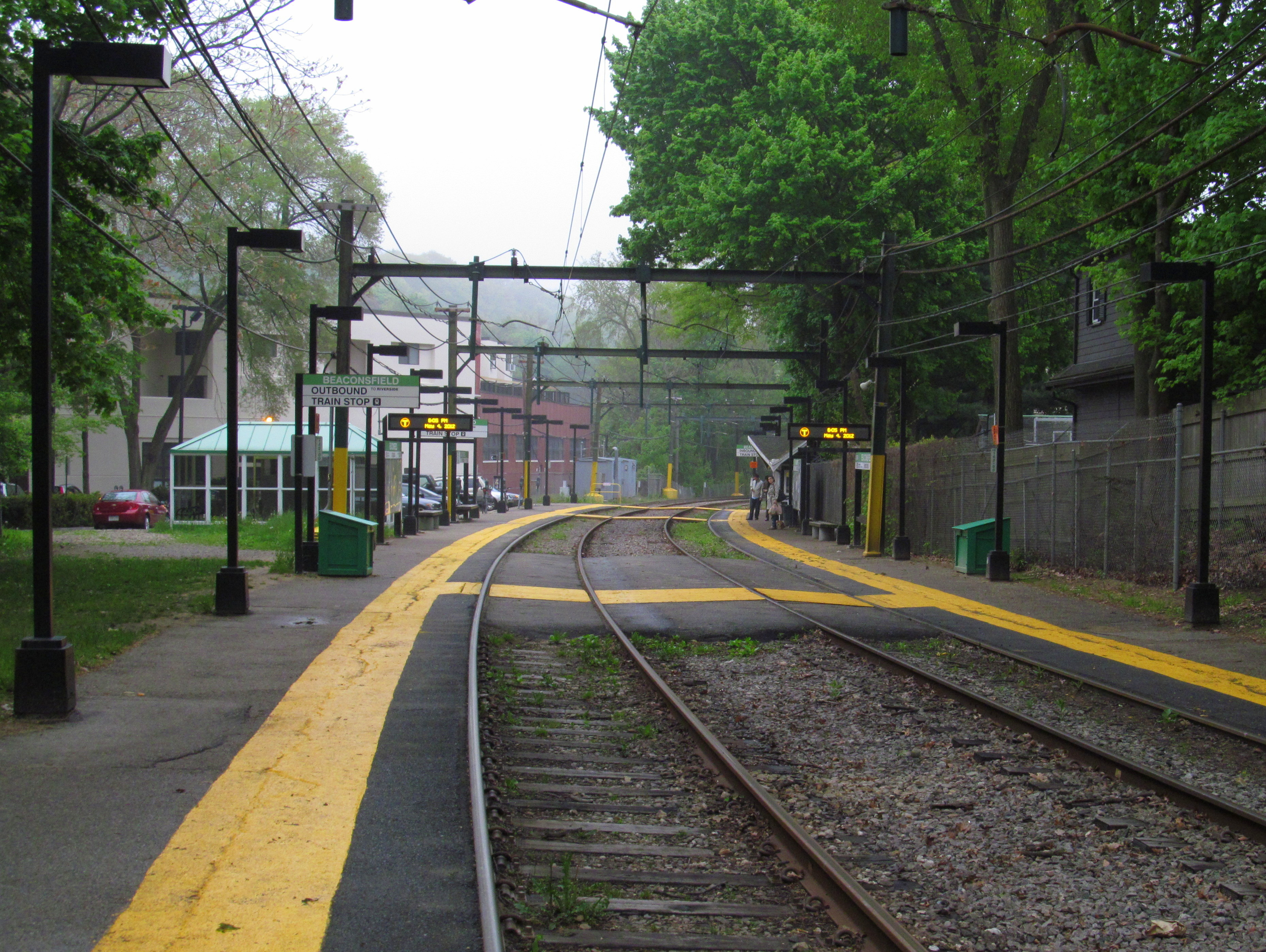
The station in 2012 prior to accessibility renovations

In 2019, the MBTA indicated that the four remaining non-accessible stops on the D branch were "Tier I" accessibility priorities. A preliminary design contract for accessibility modifications at the four stations was issued in February 2021. The station platforms will be raised and rebuilt, the wood shelter repaired, and a path constructed under Dean Road to Waldstein Playground. Design reached 75% in June 2022 and was completed late that year.

By November 2023, construction was expected to be advertised in early 2024 and begin midyear. However, in June 2024, the MBTA indicated that the renovations at the four stations would be done in two phases. The first phase added sections of accessible platform similar to those previously installed at Newton Highlands; some entrances were made accessible. Construction at the four stations took place primarily over the weekends of October 5–6 and 19–20, 2024, leaving them "generally accessible". By late 2024, full reconstructions were expected to take place in 2026–2027 to serve new Type 10 vehicles. As of December 2025, final design work is "pending determination of final scope".
