= Laura (1835 steamboat) =

1830s steamship

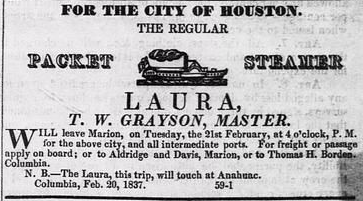
- Advertisement for Steamboat Laura from Telegraph and Texas Register (Columbia, TX), Feb. 21, 1837

History
- Name: Laura
- Owner: McKinney & Williams
- Operator: Captain Thomas Wigg Grayson
- Acquired: June 1835
- Out of service: June 1840
- Fate: Unknown

General characteristics
- Tonnage: 65
- Length: 85 ft (26 m)
- Beam: 16 ft (4.9 m)
- Draft: 5.5 ft (1.7 m)
- Decks: one
- Propulsion: Steam-powered sidewheeler

Laura is a former steamboat built in 1835, originating from a shipyard in Louisville, Kentucky.

Laura measured 85 ft (26 m) in length, and its beam measured 16 ft (4.9 m) in width. The mercantile firm of McKinney & Williams acquired Laura in June 1835.

Laura engaged on behalf of Texas Independence. Laura towed schooners to sea on behalf of the Texas Navy. On September 2, 1835, it towed an armed schooner to wage a counterattack against a Mexican cruiser. The Correo had been boarding incoming vessels from the United States. Laura assisted the schooner San Felipe in the capture of the Correo. The Texas Navy also used Laura to transport troops and supplies.

Early in 1837, the original developers of Houston, Augustus Chapman Allen and John Kirby Allen, employed the Laura to demonstrate that Buffalo Bayou was a navigable river as far as their town site. This demonstration voyage also included passengers such as John Kirby Allen, Moseley Baker, Benjamin C. Franklin, and Francis Lubbock. The Laura arrived sometime around January 21, 1837, making it the first steamboat to arrive in Houston. In March 1838, the Telegraph (of Houston) reported that Laura was making regular trips between Houston and Galveston.

The last known sighting of the Laura was in June 1840, when she was seen under tow by the steamship Constitution after breaking both drive shafts in the Brazos River.
