= MBTA nomenclature =

The Massachusetts Bay Transportation Authority (MBTA) maintains a large public transit system in the Boston, Massachusetts area, and uses various methods to name and number their services for the convenience of users.

== Subway ==
The subway system consists of four trunk lines, all of which meet downtown. Each is assigned a color, as follows:

- The Red Line, originally from Cambridge to Dorchester.
- The Green Line runs to the western suburbs, notably Brookline and Newton.
- The Orange Line's trains kept Boston Elevated Railway livery.
- The Blue Line runs under Boston Harbor and to Revere Beach.

The Red Line has two branches, in the south, called by their terminals – Ashmont and Braintree. Additionally, the Mattapan Line, a streetcar line to Mattapan, is also colored red. Some trains use the letters A, B, and C for Ashmont, Braintree and Alewife (the north terminal) respectively.

The Green Line is a streetcar/light rail system with four branches to the west, labeled "B" to "E" from north to south. The trains operate underground in the downtown area; outside of downtown, all but the "D" branch run along city streets, with frequent grade crossings at intersections. Rollsigns and newer electronic signs use the following labels:

- B – Boston College via Commonwealth Avenue
- C – Cleveland Circle via Beacon Street
- D – Riverside via Highland branch
- E – Heath Street via Huntington Avenue

=== Subway history ===
Until 1965, the lines were called by their names:

- The Red Line was the Cambridge–Dorchester tunnel (the branch to Braintree did not yet exist; it follows an Old Colony Railroad right-of-way). The Ashmont–Mattapan High Speed Line was simply called that.
- The Green Line was five streetcar lines feeding into the Tremont Street subway, named by their western terminals or the streets they ran along.
- The Orange Line was the Main Line Elevated or Forest Hills–Everett Elevated.
- The Blue Line was the East Boston Tunnel and Revere Extension.

They were also known by various numbers, used only on maps (see below for more details), as part of an integrated system of rapid transit, streetcars and buses:

- 1 Harvard–Ashmont (Red Line)
- 2 Everett–Forest Hills (Orange Line)
- 3 Bowdoin–Wonderland (Blue Line)
- 4 Riverside-Lechmere (Green Line D)
- 28 Mattapan–Ashmont (Red Line)
- 39 Arborway–Park Street (Green Line E)
- 57 Heath Street–Government Center (Green Line "E" short turns)
- 61 Cleveland Circle–North Station (Green Line C)
- 62 Boston College–Park Street (Green Line B)
- 69 Watertown–Park Street (Green Line A)

After taking over operations in August 1964, the MBTA began rebranding many elements of Boston's public transportation network. On August 26, 1965, the four rapid transit lines were assigned colored names related to their history and geography. The Red Line was named for Harvard University's crimson branding, the Blue Line for passing under Boston Harbor and along Revere Beach, the Green Line for running along the Emerald Necklace, and the Orange Line for running under a section of Washington Street originally known as Orange Street. When designing the rebranding, Cambridge Seven Associates originally planned for yellow instead of orange, but yellow was rejected after testing.

On August 26, 1965, the current colors were assigned. The Green Line branches were lettered A to E in 1967, ending the use of map numbers for the remaining rail routes. The A branch was discontinued in 1969, before lettered rollsigns were ever used on the line. As cars were interchangeable between the Green Line and Ashmont–Mattapan Line, rollsigns also included the letter F for Mattapan service, but this was later changed to M.

On some later rollsigns, short-turn trips were displayed with a slash through the letter. This use included:

- D Government Center
- E Heath Street
- E Brigham Circle

Many rollsigns only use the letters for outbound trips, with no letters next to downtown destinations. When the letters were first applied, the inbound destinations all used letters.

The Red Line branches were initially assigned letters in 1968 – A for Quincy/South Braintree and C for Ashmont. At the time, a branch to Brockton was being planned, which might have gotten the letter B. These letters were never used much, and never appeared on maps, and newer rollsigns omitted them. In 1994 the current letter coding was assigned with new cars.

== Buses and streetcars ==
Bus routes are assigned numbers, which are displayed on maps and buses. Generally, the numbers increase from South Boston clockwise to East Boston. Numbers above 202 are used by outlying routes, assigned by region as follows:

- 210–299 run in the Quincy area.
- 300–399 run in the northwest suburbs.
- 400–499 minus the 411 and 430 run in the Lynn area.
- 500–599 run in the Newton area.
- Numbers from 600–699 and 700–799 are assigned to special MBTA services, but are not publicly used. Most temporary rail replacement buses are numbered in the 600 series (for example, the Green Line Bus Shuttle is 602.2), and supplemental services get 700-series numbers.

The Silver Line Phase I (Washington Street) service have SL4 & SL5. SL5 to Downtown Crossing is internally the 749, as it replaced the 49. The SL4 to South Station is internally 751. The branches of Phase II (South Boston Waterfront) are assigned labels SL1, SL2, and SL3. Shuttles running only to Silver Line Way are not labeled. Internally, the shuttle is 746, and the branches are SL1 as 746.1 or 741 to Logan Airport in East Boston, SL2 as 746.2, or 742 to Design Center in South Boston, and SL3 as 743 to Chelsea.

The two (formerly three) crosstown routes are publicly assigned CT1 to CT3. Internally, they too are given 700-series numbers, based on a parallel route. The former CT1 mostly ran the same route as the 1, so it was the 701. Part of the CT2 parallels the 47, so that part is the 747, and a more recent extension is the 748 (always through-routed). The CT3, paralleling the 8, is the 708, and the former extension was the 709.

Night Owl buses were assigned in the 700 series as well (with a suffix of N). Night Owl buses that replaced other buses were given the normal bus number with N.

Additionally, several private bus companies are subsidized by the MBTA. Some of those are assigned numbers from 710 to 716.

=== Buses and streetcars history ===
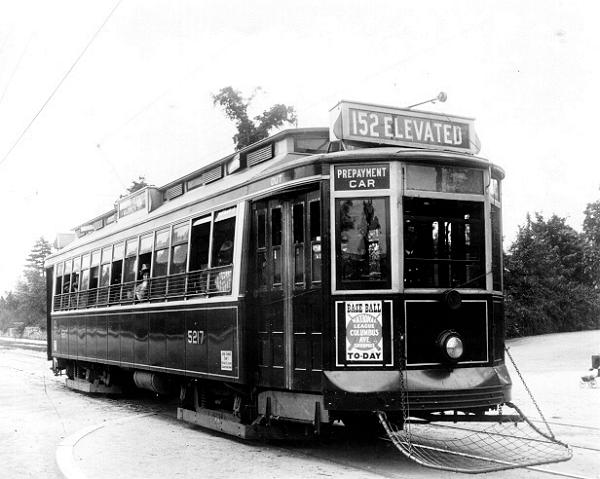
The 1911 numbering system – this route went along the east side of Franklin Park and ended at Dudley Square with a transfer to the Washington Street Elevated

The first numbers used were implemented with Hunter sign boxes, approximately from 1910 to 1917. Numbers were three digits, with the first referring to the division. In 1918, the network was substantially reorganized, and numbers were no longer used. However, from then until 1967, a similar four-digit system was used internally.

Numbers resembling the current system were first assigned on the 1936 map. However, until the 1942 edition, the numbers changed with each new printing as routes were added and removed. In addition, these routes were only used on the map, not even on schedules. From 1942 on, the numbers generally remained the same, with a minor renumbering in 1967 prior to implementing the numbers on rollsigns and schedules.

As the MBTA began to take over suburban bus systems, it assigned them numbers in higher ranges.

The Eastern Massachusetts Street Railway's buses were taken over on March 30, 1968, and numbers were assigned as follows:

- Lowell area routes were numbered from 201 to 216. 215 was truncated to lie within the Boston area and was renumbered 136 in March 1969. The rest were either discontinued or renumbered in the 700 series in March 1970, being operated under contract for Lowell. Several of these have since been truncated and renumbered in the 300 series in the 1980s.
- Lawrence area routes were numbered from 301 to 318. 318 became 137 in March 1969, as it was transferred to the Boston division. All other routes were removed by late 1968.
- Lynn area routes were numbered from 401 to 451. Some in the Melrose area were renumbered from 131 to 135 when they were moved to existing MBTA garages in March 1969. In early 1970 the rest were renumbered to different 400-series numbers.
- Quincy area routes were assigned numbers from 501 to 524. In June 1970, they were renumbered from 210 to 279, with a completely changed order.
- Brockton area routes were given numbers from 600 to 617. 616 became the 34E, an extension of the 34, in December 1968, when it was shifted to the Arborway Garage. Several others became Quincy-area routes and were given 200-series numbers in June 1970. The rest were discontinued in 1968 and December 1969.

The Middlesex and Boston Street Railway buses were subsidized by the MBTA in September 1964, and they were assigned numbers from 20 to 36 (extended to 39 in November 1967, on the takeover of routes from Transit Bus Lines), duplicating existing MBTA numbers. The MBTA took over the M&B on June 30, 1972, and added a 5 in front. The routes were given unused numbers from 52 to 76 in September 1982, and in 1996 the ones operating express to downtown Boston via the Mass Pike were again assigned a 5 in front.
