= Valley Road station =

Light rail station in Milton, Massachusetts, US

Valley Road
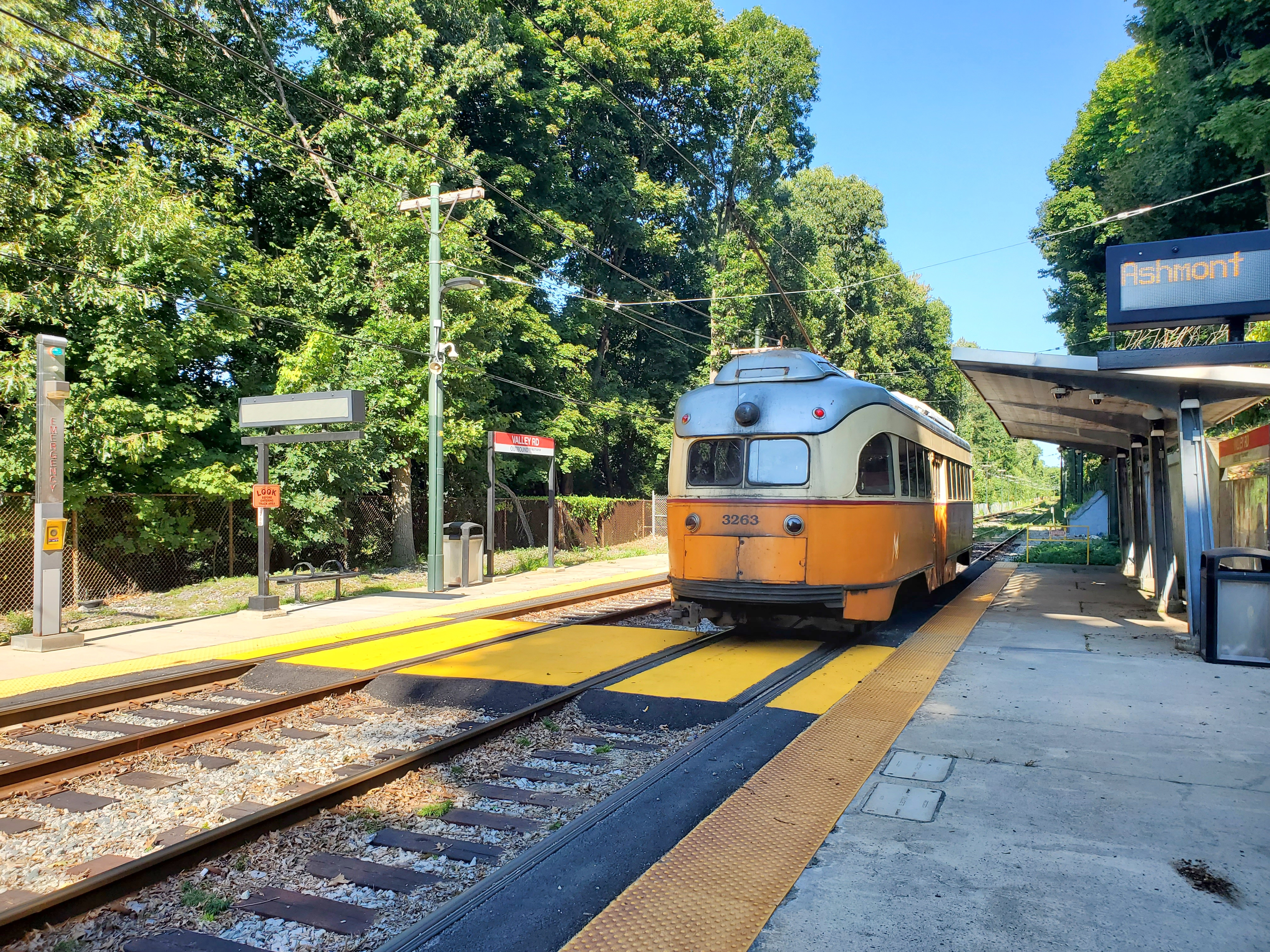
- An inbound streetcar leaving Valley Road station in 2024

General information
- Location: 291 Eliot Street; Milton, Massachusetts
- Coordinates: 42.268352°N 71.081499°W
- Line: Milton Branch
- Platforms: 2 side platforms
- Tracks: 2

Construction
- Accessible: No

History
- Opened: December 21, 1929
- Rebuilt: June 24, 2006–December 22, 2007

Passengers
- 2025: 35 daily boardings

Services
Preceding station	MBTA	Following station
Capen Street toward Mattapan	Mattapan Line	Central Avenue toward Ashmont
Location

Valley Road station is a light rail station in Milton, Massachusetts. It serves the MBTA's Mattapan Line, a branch of the Red Line. The station is located off Eliot Street near Valley Road and consists of two side platforms that serve the lines's two tracks. Valley Road is the only station on the line that is not accessible.

== History ==
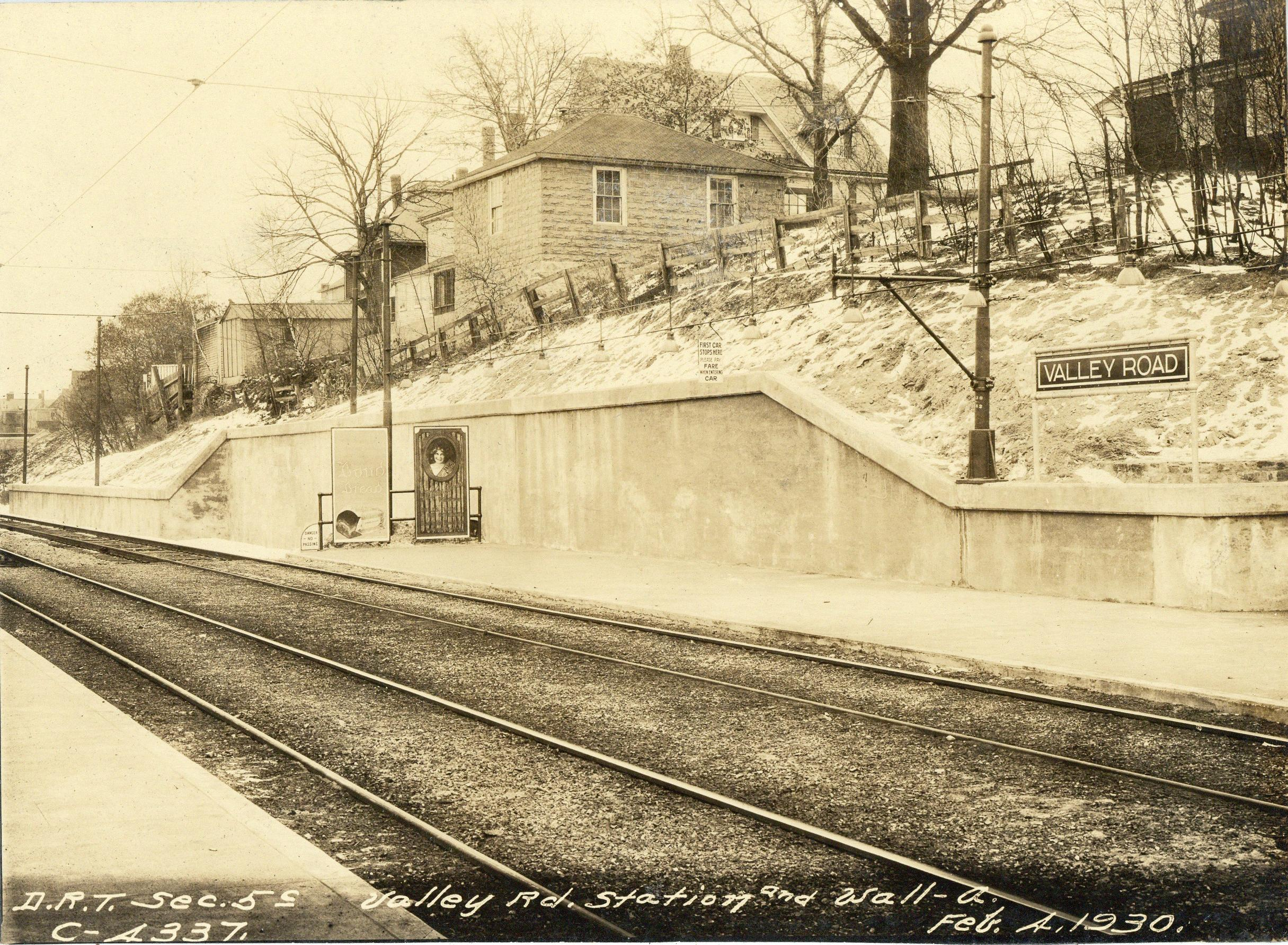
Valley Road station in February 1930

Valley Road opened on December 21, 1929, along with Central Avenue and Mattapan as the second phase of the Mattapan Line. Like Capen Street (opened in 1930) and Butler (1931), it had not previously been the site of a railroad station. In 1932, local politicians advocated for the construction of a footbridge across the Neponset River to provide transit access to the Boston Consumptives Hospital from the station. The bridge was not built; until the Harvest River Bridge carrying the Lower Neponset River Trail was built about 0.2 miles (0.3 km) west in 2016, there was no pedestrian crossing of the river between Mattapan Square and Central Avenue.

The whole line closed from June 24, 2006, to December 22, 2007, for a complete renovation. Unlike the other stations, Valley Road was not made accessible; its position below a hillside would have required a complex set of ramps. This was deemed too expensive for the stop, which had the second-lowest ridership of any MBTA rapid transit stop in 2010 at just 44 daily riders. As part of a 2018 amendment to the settlement of Joanne Daniels-Finegold, et al. v. MBTA, the MBTA agreed to study whether and how to make the stop accessible.

The MBTA plans to convert the line to modern light rail equipment. All stations would have raised platforms for level boarding on the new vehicles; Valley Road and three other stations would be converted to island platforms. Construction cost for Valley Road station was estimated as $20.8 million – twice that of other intermediate stations on the line – in 2023.
