= Capen Street station =

Light rail station in Milton, Massachusetts, US

Capen Street
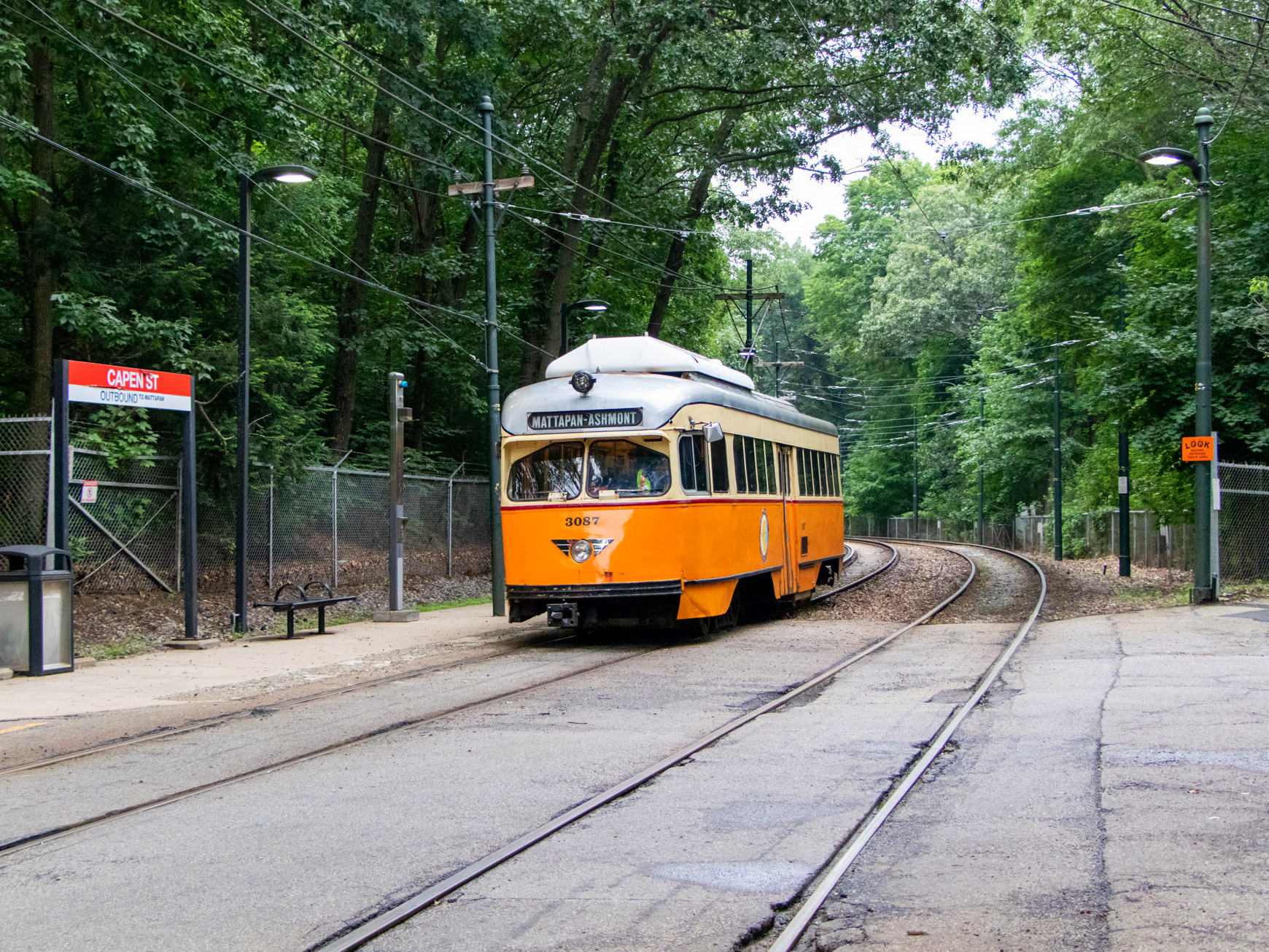
- An outbound streetcar at Capen Street station in July 2021

General information
- Location: Capen Street off Eliot Street; Milton, Massachusetts
- Coordinates: 42.2676°N 71.0873°W
- Line: Milton Branch
- Platforms: 2 side platforms
- Tracks: 2

Construction
- Accessible: Yes

History
- Opened: c. September 1930
- Rebuilt: June 24, 2006–December 22, 2007

Passengers
- 2025: 41 daily boardings

Services
Preceding station	MBTA	Following station
Mattapan Terminus	Mattapan Line	Valley Road toward Ashmont
Location

Capen Street station is a light rail station in Milton, Massachusetts. It serves the MBTA Mattapan Line. It is located on Capen Street off Eliot Street; the westernmost of the four MBTA stations in Milton, it consists of two side platforms flanking the eponymous street's grade crossing. The platforms are staggered to allow trains to make the stop at Capen Street before crossing the street itself, as there is no signal at the grade crossing. Capen Street is accessible via wooden ramps on both platforms. Capen Street opened in September 1930 as an infill station on the line.

== History ==
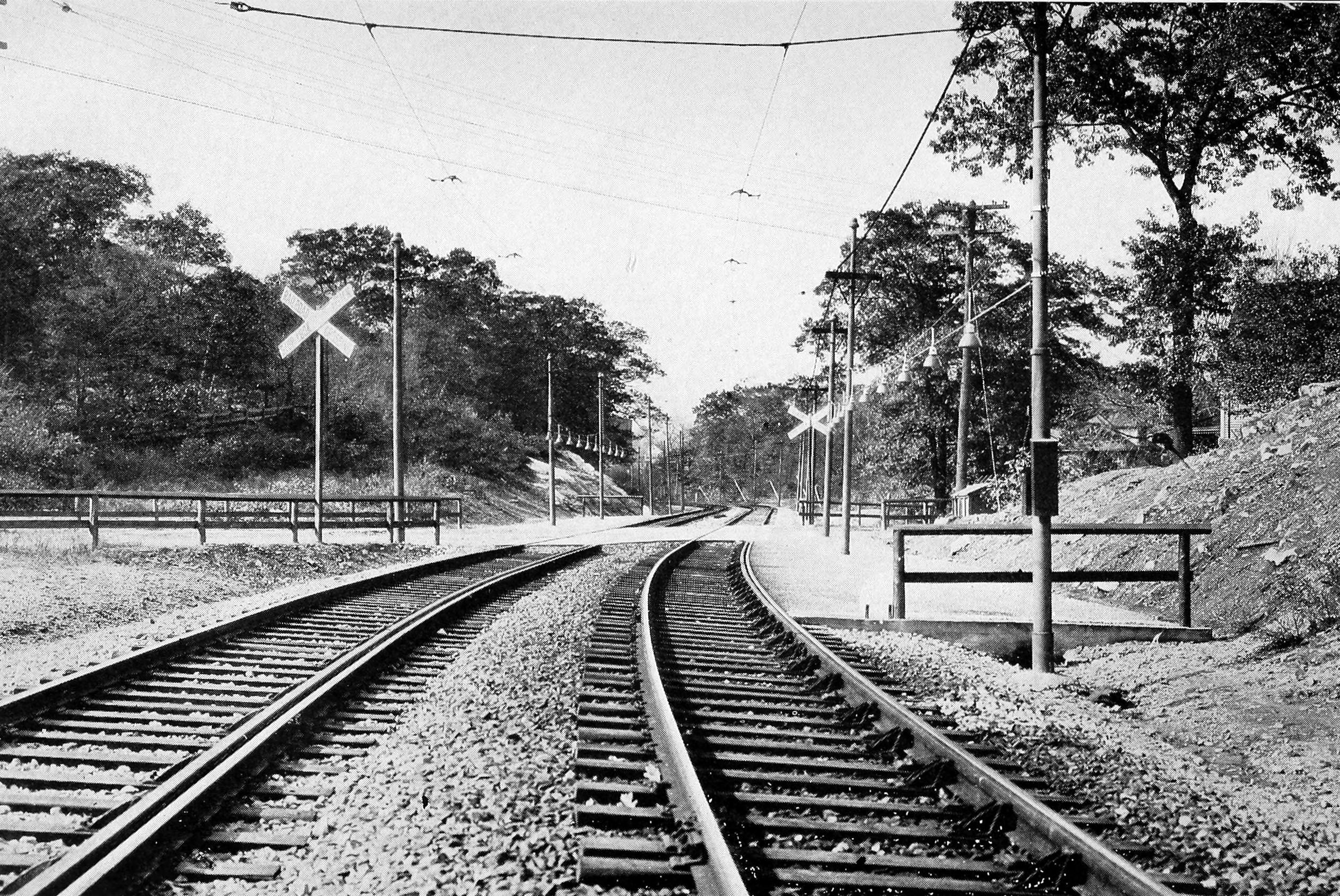
Capen Street in 1930, shortly after opening

The Dorchester and Milton Branch Railroad opened from Neponset to Mattapan in December 1847. Service was discontinued on August 26, 1929, as the new high-speed trolley line was completed from Ashmont to Milton by the Boston Elevated Railway (BERy). The trolley line was extended from Milton to Mattapan on December 21, 1929, with new intermediate stops at Central Avenue and Valley Road.

Residents on Capen Street, having to use the Valley Road stop despite the line crossing Capen Street, requested a station of their own; it was considered a likely possibility at the time of the line's opening. After considering the walking distance from Capen Street to Valley Road and Mattapan, the BERy granted the request. The Boston Transit Department constructed 12-foot (3.7 m) by 100-foot (30 m) gravel platforms with overhead lighting. The completed station opened as a flag stop in September 1930. A second infill stop at Butler Street opened the next year.

On October 8, 1982, a shotgun-wielding man attempted to rob the six passengers aboard an inbound trolley at Capen Street. One of the passengers foiled the attempt by grabbing the unloaded gun from the robber.

The MBTA closed the line on June 24, 2006 to allow a new viaduct to be constructed at Ashmont station. During the closure, all stations on the line were modernized and (except for Valley Road) made accessible. The old shelter and platforms were replaced by modern platforms with canopies, with a wooden ramp on each platform for accessibility. Streetcar service resumed on December 22, 2007.

The MBTA plans to convert the line to modern light rail equipment. All stations would have raised platforms for level boarding on the new vehicles; Capen Street and three other stations would be converted to island platforms. Construction cost for Capen Street station was estimated as $8.0 million in 2023.
