= Mattapan station =

Light rail station in Boston, Massachusetts, US

Mattapan
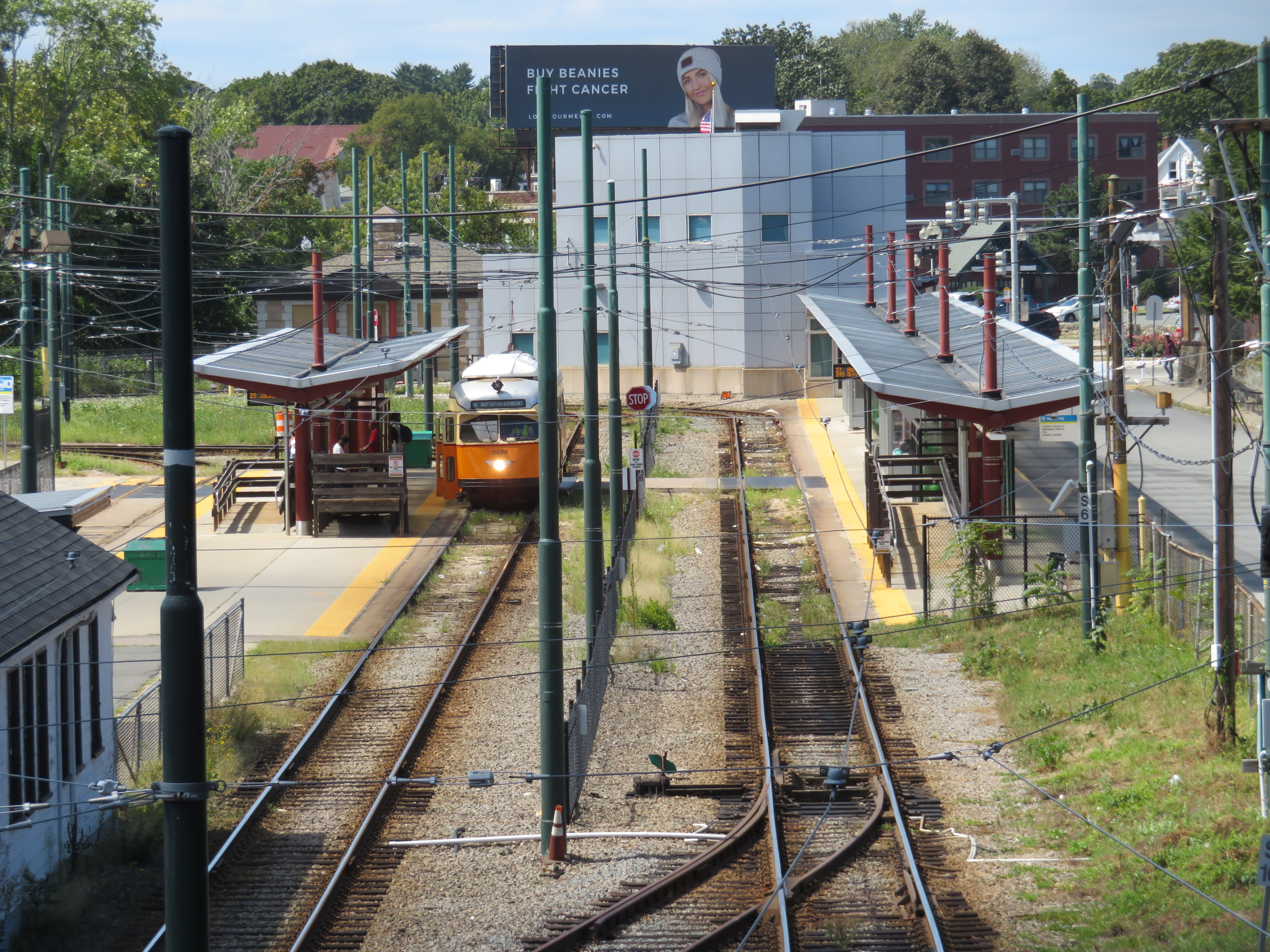
- A PCC streetcar at Mattapan station in August 2018

General information
- Location: River Street at Blue Hill Avenue; Boston, Massachusetts
- Coordinates: 42.26758°N 71.09242°W
- Line: Milton Branch
- Platforms: 1 side platform (deboarding); 1 island platform (boarding)
- Tracks: 1 track on balloon loop; splits to 2 tracks for inbound boarding platform
- Connections: MBTA bus: 24, 28, 29, 30, 31, 33, 245, 716

Construction
- Parking: 100 spaces
- Cycle facilities: 8 spaces
- Accessible: Yes

History
- Opened: December 1, 1847
- Rebuilt: August 24–December 21, 1929; June 24, 2006–December 22, 2007

Passengers
- 2025: 1,596 daily boardings

Services
Preceding station	MBTA	Following station
Terminus	Mattapan Line	Capen Street toward Ashmont
Former services
Preceding station	New York, New Haven and Hartford Railroad	Following station
Terminus	Boston–Mattapan	Central Avenue toward Boston
Track layout
Location

Mattapan station is an MBTA light rail station in Boston, Massachusetts. It is the southern terminus of the Mattapan Line, part of the Red Line, and is also an important MBTA bus transfer station, with eight routes terminating there. It is located at Mattapan Square in the Mattapan neighborhood. At the station, streetcars use a balloon loop to reverse direction back to Ashmont station. Mattapan station is fully accessible, with mini-high platforms.

== History ==
=== Railroad station ===
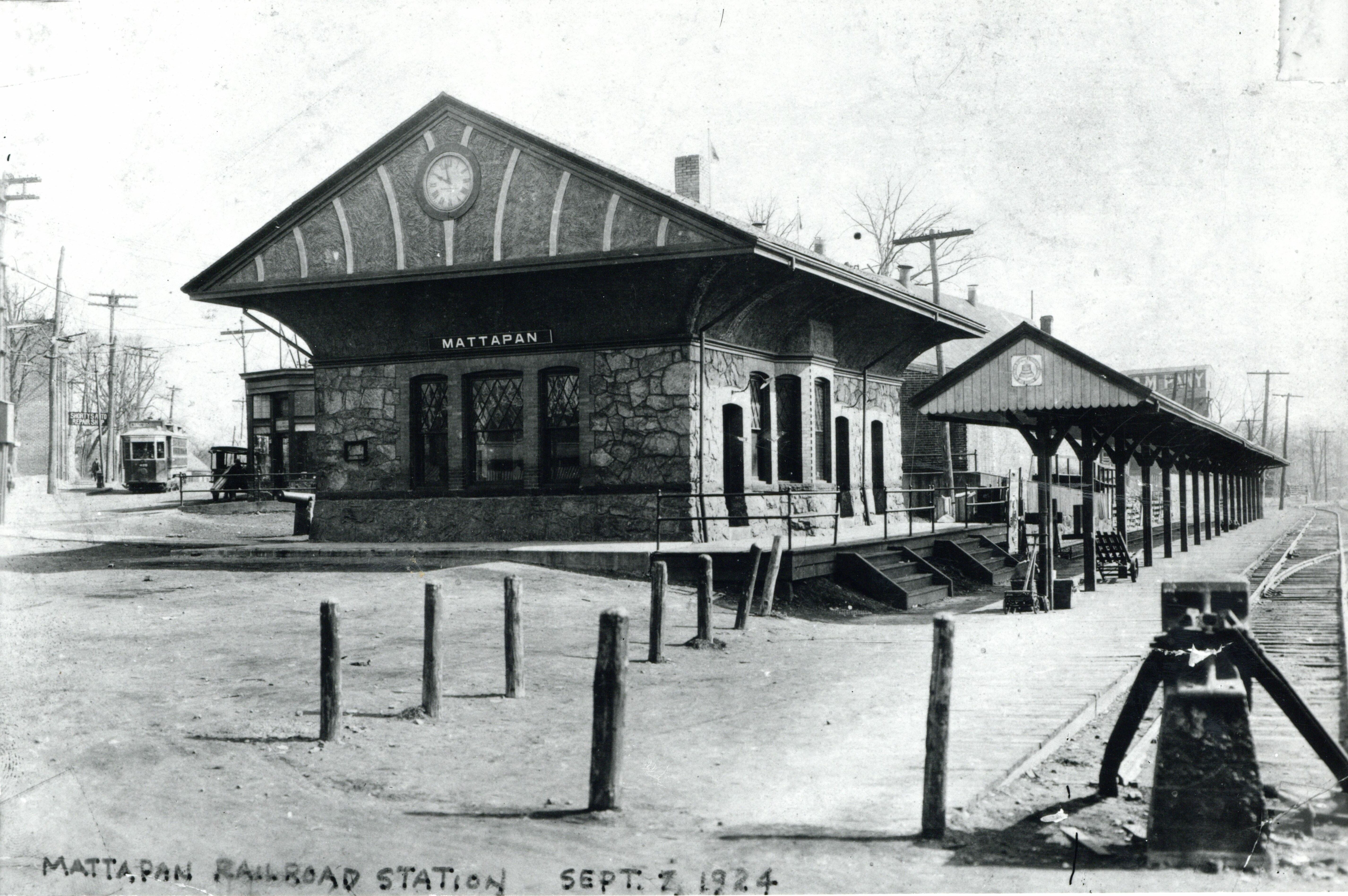
Mattapan station in 1924

The Dorchester and Milton Branch Railroad opened from Neponset to the Upper Mills section of Dorchester (later called Mattapan) on December 1, 1847. It became part of the Old Colony Railroad system the next year. A wooden station building was located on the east side of Brush Hill Turnpike (now Blue Hill Avenue) at Mattapan Square along with an engine house and turntable. The station was initially called Dorchester. It was renamed Milton Upper Mills around 1850, then Mattapan by 1858. A freight house for the Tileston and Hollingsworth Company was added south of the station later in the century.

The widening of Blue Hill Avenue in 1901 necessitated construction of a new station set 100 feet (30 m) further back from the road. An old passenger car began serving as a temporary station in August 1901. The new stone building measured 26 by 45 feet (7.9 m × 13.7 m) with a 26-by-31-foot (7.9 m × 9.4 m) waiting room. A sheltered island platform served passenger trains. The new station opened on July 4, 1902.

=== Streetcar station ===
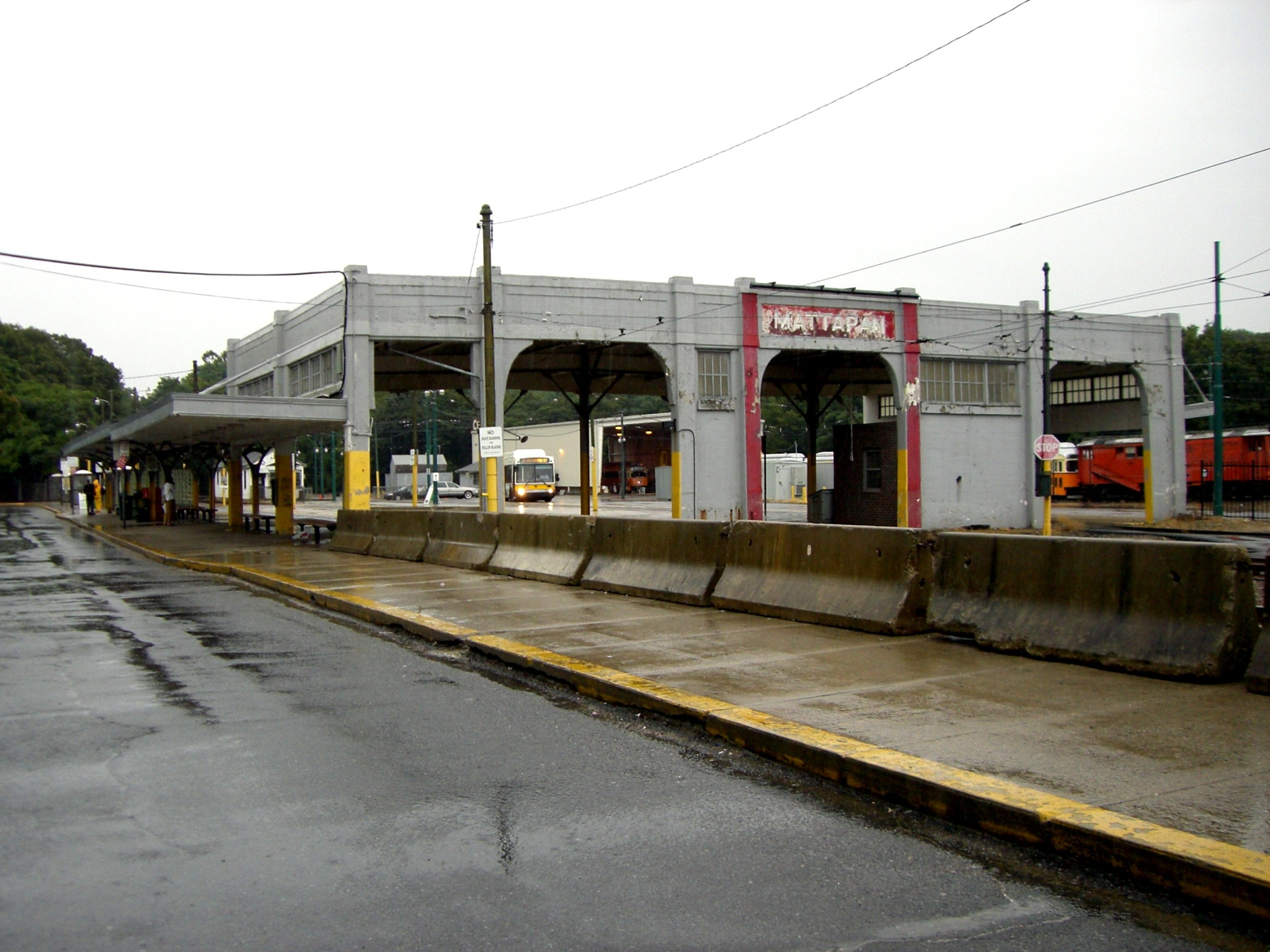
The remnant of the 1929-built station in 2006

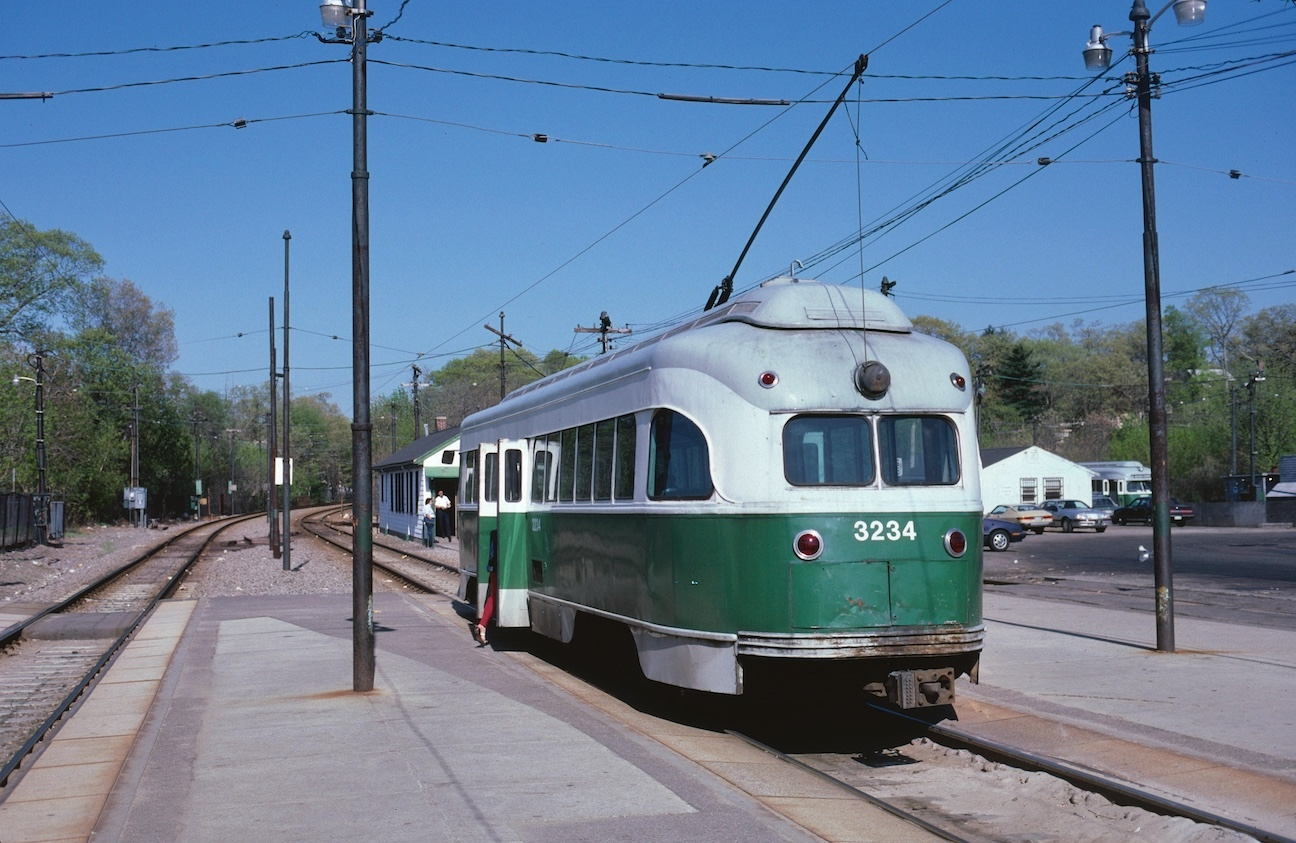
A passenger boarding via the left-side door of a streetcar in 1987, when the Mattapan fleet still wore Green Line colors

Passenger service on the Milton Branch ended on August 24, 1929, for conversion of the line to rapid transit. The first segment of the Mattapan Line, a "high-speed" streetcar line, opened between Ashmont and Milton two days later. The second segment, between Milton and Mattapan, opened on December 21, 1929. A streetcar transfer station and yard replaced the old rail yard. The station building was kept and converted for use by businesses. The MTA began charging for parking at its stations, including Mattapan, on November 2, 1953.

Around 2000, the MBTA constructed an enclosed maintenance facility at Mattapan, replacing an open pit.

On May 5, 2006, the MBTA awarded a $6.2 million contract to replace the 1929-built station. The MBTA closed the line on June 24 to allow a new viaduct to be constructed at Ashmont station. During the closure, all stations on the line were modernized and (except for Valley Road) made accessible. The 1929-built shelter and platforms were replaced by modern platforms with canopies; a new building for MBTA police and bus operations with a community room was built. Streetcar service resumed on December 22, 2007.

In 2014, the MBTA made $500,000 in additional renovations to the station. These included upgraded shelters and heating in passenger waiting areas, pedestrian improvements, improved signage, and bicycle storage.

The MBTA plans to convert the line to modern light rail equipment. All stations would have raised platforms for level boarding on the new vehicles; the existing Mattapan platforms would be replaced by a single island platform. An expanded maintenance facility for the line would be built next to the south busway.

=== Transit-oriented development ===
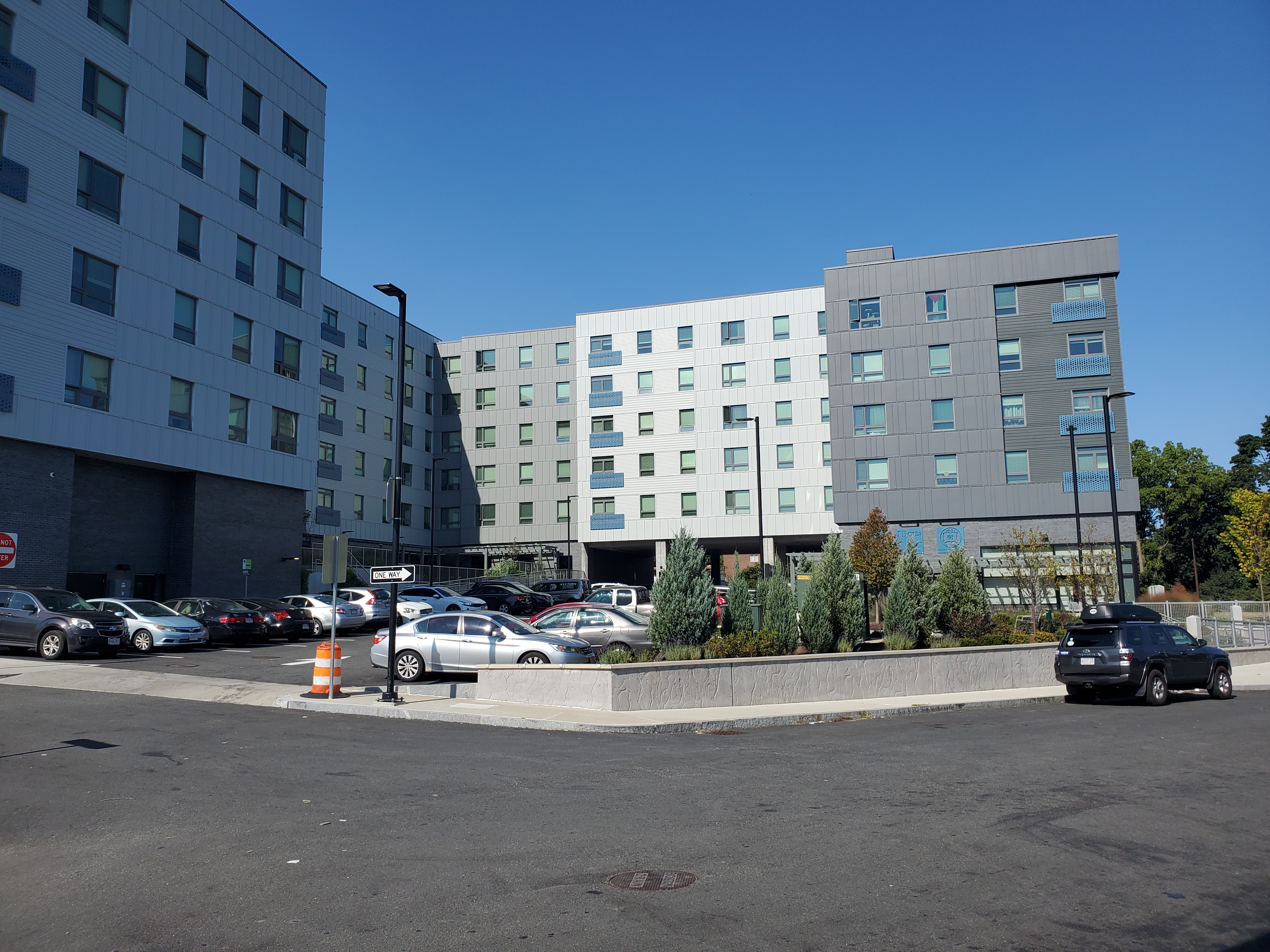
The completed development in 2024

As part of the first round of modernization, the MBTA began planning for mixed-use transit-oriented development (TOD) to be built on the underused station parking lot. The planned development was not built, even after a second request for proposals was issued in 2012. In July 2014, a local charter school announced plans to build a new building on the site, despite calls for a third RFP to be issued to attract TOD instead. In January 2015, after opposition from local officials about the school's $1.5 million offer, the MBTA announced it would instead issue a third RFP that March. The third RFP was issued in November 2015.

In July 2016, the MBTA Fiscal and Management Control Board selected the winner from two proposals for the property. The winning bidder, POAH/Nuestra, will pay the MBTA $4.89 million over the first 20 years of a 99-year lease of the site, upon which they built 135 rental units and 12,000 square feet (1,100 m^{2}) of ground-floor retail. 50 parking spaces were reserved for MBTA riders. The project was approved by the city in 2018. Financing was secured in November 2020, with construction starting shortly after for a planned 2022 completion. The $57 million development, called "The Loop at Mattapan Station", opened in April 2023.
