= Lower Neponset River Trail =

Rail trail in Boston, Massachusetts, United States

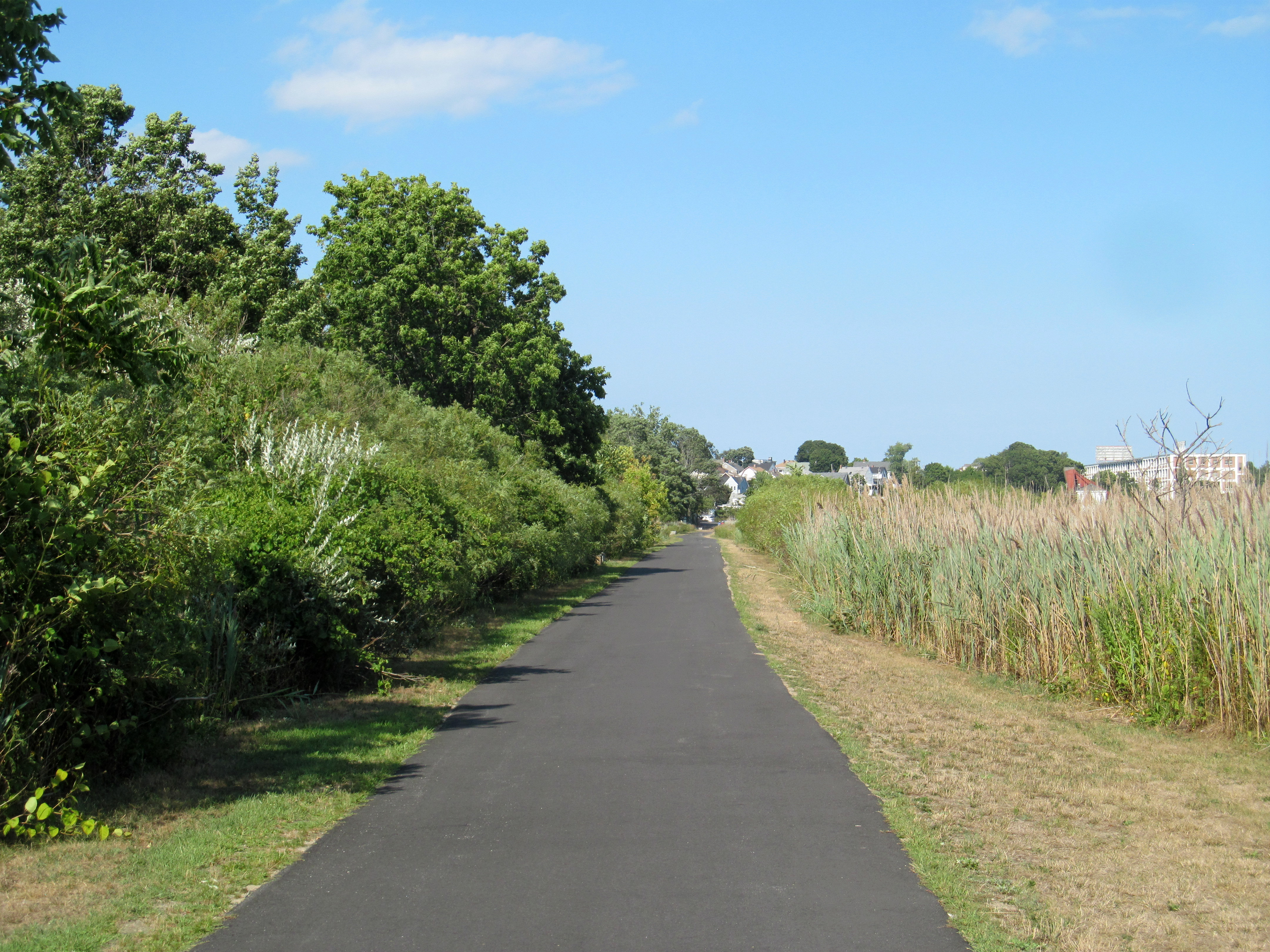
- Neponset Trail east of Shawmut underpass in 2016
- Length: 2.4 mi (3.9 km)
- Location: Dorchester, Massachusetts to Mattapan, Massachusetts
- Trailheads: Port Norfolk, Dorchester; River Street, Mattapan (42°16′12″N 71°04′24″W)
- Use: Hiking, bicycling
- Difficulty: Easy
- Season: Year-round
- Sights: Marsh, mills

The Lower Neponset River Trail is a 2.4-mile-long (3.9 km) rail trail running along the Neponset River in the Dorchester section of Boston, Massachusetts. It roughly follows the path of the eastern part of the Dorchester and Milton Branch Railroad from the Port Norfolk neighborhood in Dorchester to the Central Avenue T Station in Milton, passing through Pope John Paul II Park, the Neponset Marshes, and the Lower Mills area.
