= Mattapan Line =

Light rail line in Boston and Milton, Massachusetts

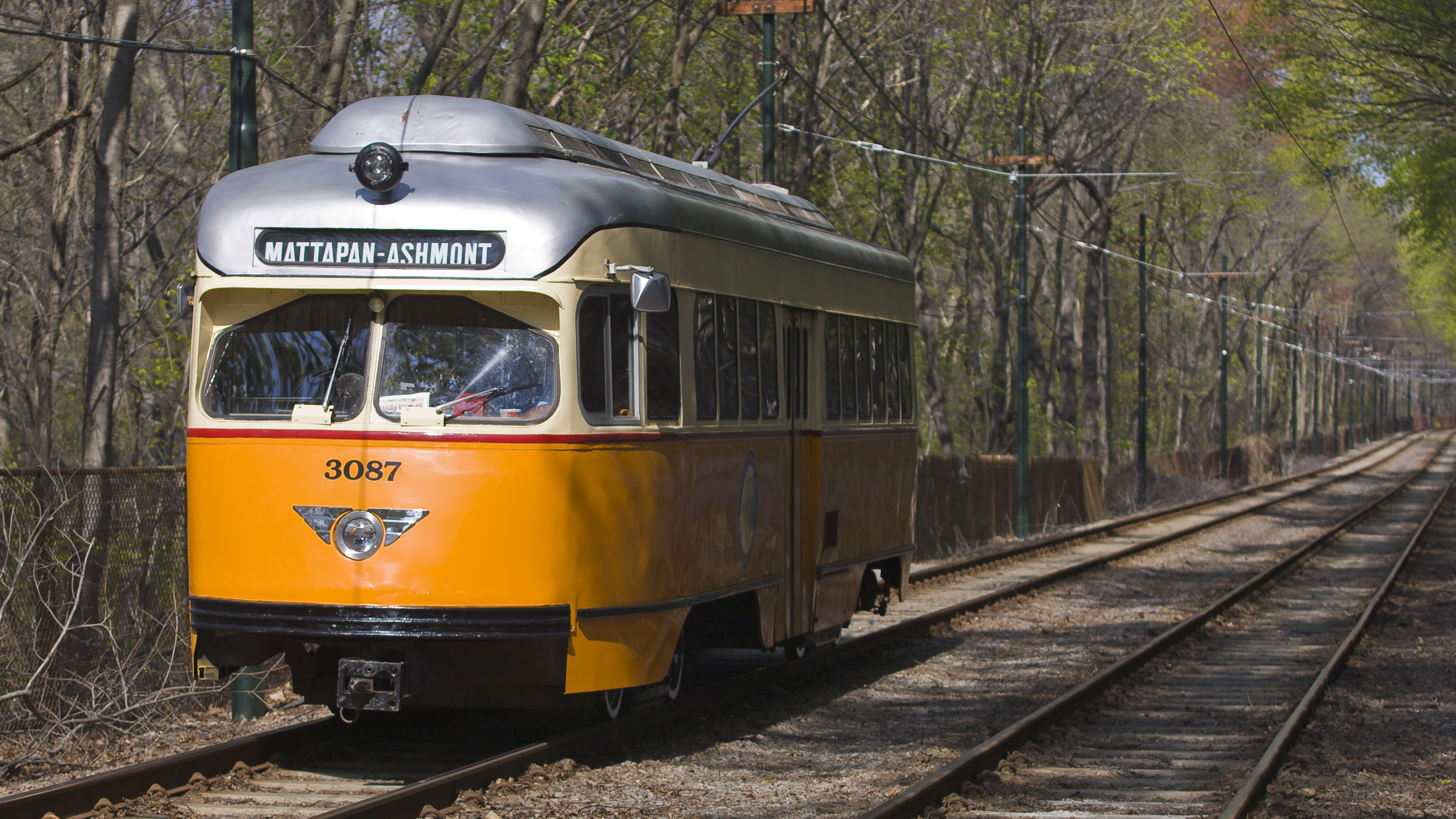
- PCC streetcar #3087 in Milton in 2008

Overview
- Other name(s): Mattapan Trolley; Ashmont–Mattapan High-Speed Line
- Owner: MBTA
- Locale: Boston and Milton, Massachusetts
- Termini: Ashmont; Mattapan
- Stations: 8

Service
- Type: Light rail
- System: MBTA subway
- Rolling stock: PCC streetcar
- Daily ridership: 2,807 (July 2026)

History
- Opened: August 26, 1929 (Ashmont to Milton); December 21, 1929 (Milton to Mattapan)

Technical
- Line length: 2.54 miles (4.09 km)
- Character: Private right-of-way (largely grade-separated)
- Track gauge: 4 ft 8 1/2 in (1,435 mm) standard gauge
- Minimum radius: 43 ft (13 m)
- Electrification: Overhead line, 600 V DC

The Mattapan Line (alternatively the Mattapan Trolley and historically the Ashmont–Mattapan High-Speed Line) is a partially grade-separated light rail line which forms part of the MBTA's Red Line rapid transit line. The line, which runs through Boston and Milton, Massachusetts, opened on August 26, 1929, as a conversion of a former commuter rail line. It exclusively uses PCC streetcars built in the 1940s. Passengers must transfer at Ashmont to access the rest of the Red Line, which uses heavy rail metro rolling stock.

The trolley's 2.6-mile (4.2 km) route is used only by streetcars and has just two public grade crossings. All stations have low platforms, but all except Valley Road have been retrofitted with wheelchair lifts or wooden ramps for accessibility. Unlike most heritage streetcar lines, it is an integral part of the modern MBTA transit system rather than a tourist attraction. A rebuild of the line for modern light rail vehicles is planned.

== History ==
=== Commuter rail lines ===
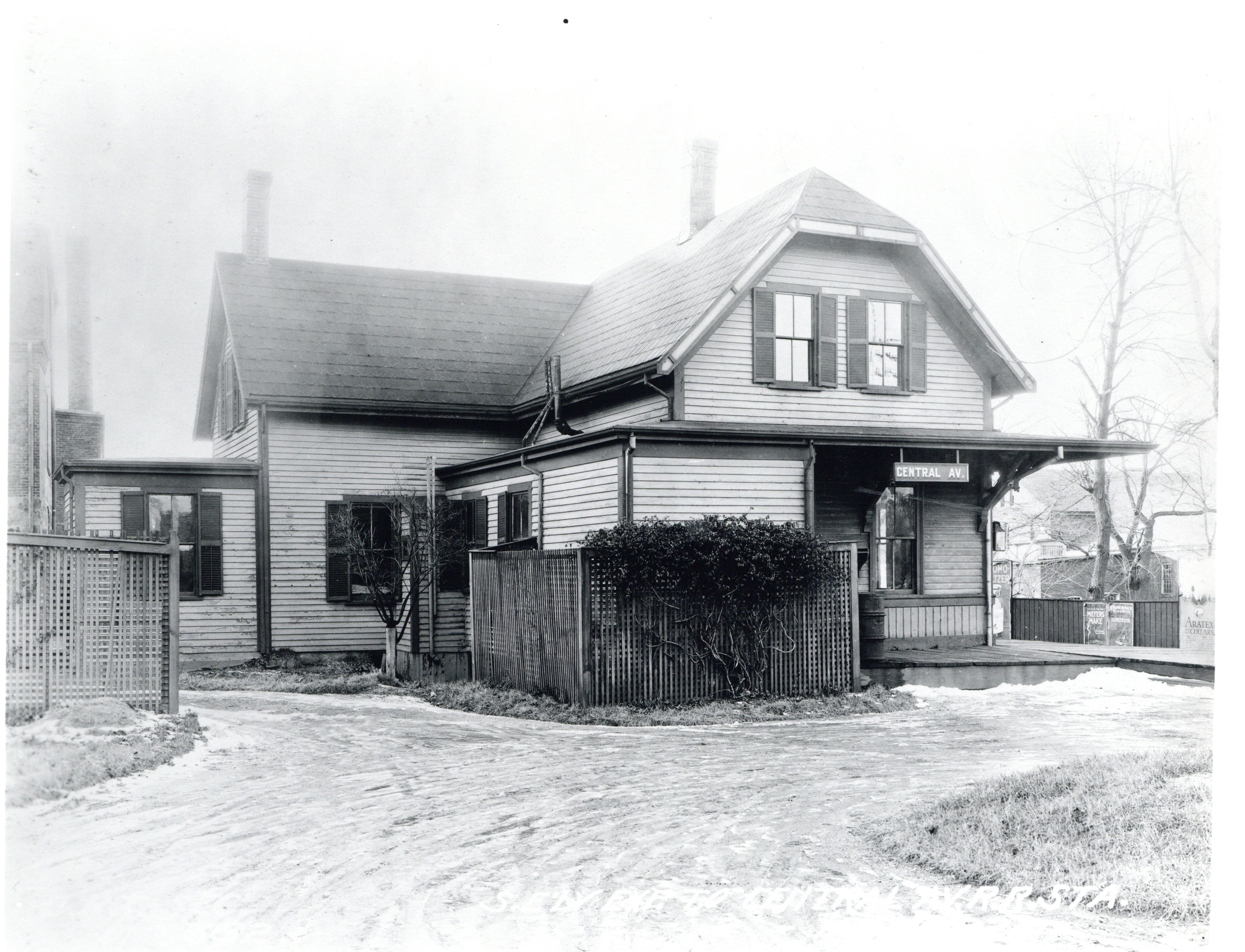
Central Avenue station in 1924

The Dorchester and Milton Branch Railroad opened in December 1847 from Neponset on the Old Colony Railroad main line to Mattapan station in Dorchester via Milton Mills (later Milton Lower Mills, then simply Milton). The line was immediately leased by the Old Colony as its Milton branch. The Old Colony built the Shawmut Branch Railroad from Harrison Square on the main line to Milton Lower Mills via Peabody Square in 1872. Most Mattapan passenger service switched to use the new branch east of Milton, as it ran through dense urban neighborhoods rather than swamps. The Old Colony Railroad and its branches were acquired by the New York, New Haven and Hartford Railroad in 1893.

When the Boston Elevated Railway (BERy) was first constructing its rapid transit Cambridge–Dorchester line in the early 1910s, plans called for the line to be extended south from Andrew to Codman Square via Edward Everett Square, Columbia Square, and Mount Bowdoin. The route would have paralleled the New Haven's Shawmut branch and Midland Division. By the end of that decade, however, passenger traffic on both New Haven-owned lines had been decimated by the BERy's network of electrified streetcar lines, which connected to rapid transit trains at Forest Hills, Egleston, Dudley Square, and Andrew. Around 1920, BERy reached an agreement with the New Haven and the Boston Transit Commission to pursue the Dorchester Circuit Plan. Under that plan, a bidirectional rapid transit loop would run south from Andrew along the Old Colony main line, take over the Shawmut Branch and Milton branch to Mattapan, cut over to the Midland Division on a tunnel, and return to Andrew via the Midland Division right-of-way and another tunnel segment.

=== Rapid transit conversion ===
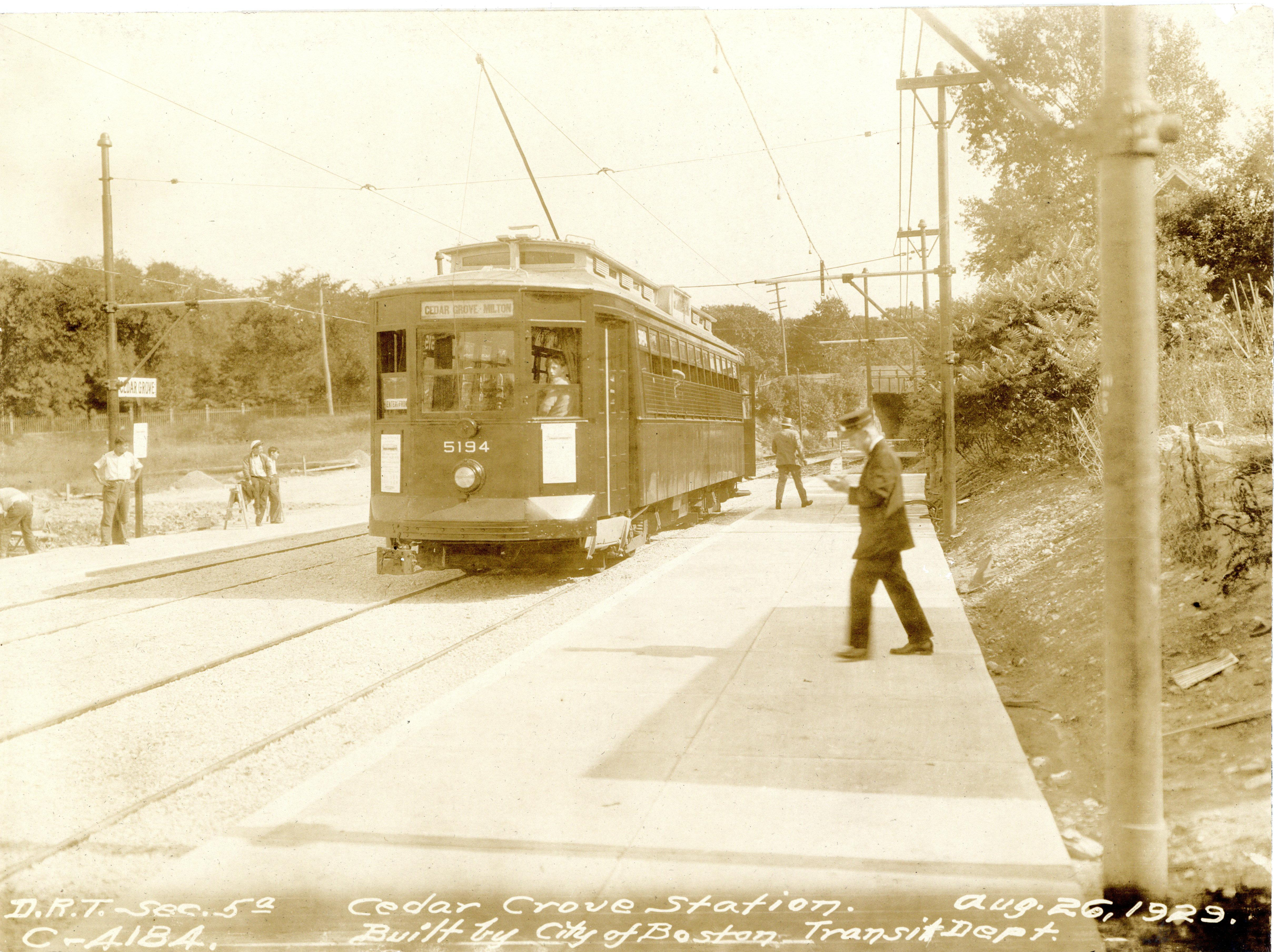
A streetcar at Cedar Grove station in 1929

Although the Midland Branch served more populated areas, real estate deals along the Shawmut branch stood to benefit key state politicians. Construction of a rapid transit extension to Mattapan via the Shawmut branch was approved on March 23, 1923.

Steam trains were discontinued in 1927 and the line was closed for two years while it was modified for streetcars. There was a debate at that time whether or not to continue subway trains from Boston to Ashmont onwards to Mattapan, but the cost of full-scale subway service was apparently too high for the Boston Elevated Railway which then operated it. The line opened from Ashmont to Milton on August 26, 1929, and from Milton to Mattapan on December 21, 1929. Infill stations were opened at Capen Street in September 1930 and Butler on October 7, 1931.

=== MBTA era ===
In 1966, the Red Line designation was also applied to the line, which had been known as 28 Mattapan–Ashmont. On March 18, 1968, the Neponset River flooded the line at Milton. Restoration work began at 6:00 am on March 21 as the waters receded; service was resumed by 4:30 pm. In January 1981, the MBTA proposed to close the Mattapan Line at all times beginning that March due to severe budget issues. The closure was cancelled, though the Mattapan Line and the Ashmont Branch were closed from June 20, 1981, to January 16, 1982, for track replacement and tunnel repairs.

On November 5, 1999, an HP Hood warehouse near Milton station was destroyed by fire. Mattapan Line service was suspended until November 17, 1999, while hazardous material was removed and the warehouse demolished. Around 2000, a sheltered maintenance facility replaced the open pit at Mattapan.

The line's longest shutdown took place from June 24, 2006, to December 22, 2007, with shuttle buses replacing streetcar service. A new elevated loop was built at Ashmont – part of a major reconstruction of the station – and the aging canopy at Mattapan was replaced. The intermediate stations were also rebuilt; all stations except Valley Road were made accessible. The streetcars were modified for the new Charliecard fare collection system during the closure. Buses again replaced service on the line from October 14–29, 2023, to allow for track work.

The MBTA launched the Mattapan Line Transformation project in 2019, though it was largely inactive until 2022. The project aims to replace the PCC trolleys with light rail vehicles as the Green Line fleet turns over, restore the line's ability to operate during snowstorms, rebuild all eight stations, replace track and signals, and repair bridges. Rehabilitation of the existing fleet is happening at the same time, to extend trolley life a few more years until LRVs arrive. By 2023, work was underway on 15% design. The 2007-built loop at Ashmont station will be removed as part of the project.

== Route ==
Geographical map of the line

The line begins and ends within the city of Boston, but most of the southern half of its route is in the northern part of the neighboring town of Milton. It follows the right-of-way of two former Old Colony Railroad branches which had commuter rail service until the 1920s. Much of the route parallels the Neponset River, crossing it twice. The right-of-way is owned by the MBTA and has only two at-grade crossings on its 2.6-mile (4.2 km) route. Between Cedar Grove and Butler stations, the line runs through the center of the Cedar Grove Cemetery.

As of July 2023, the line operates on 6 minute headways at weekday peak hours and 12–13 minute headways at other times.

=== Station listing ===
Location	Station	Opened	Notes and connections
Dorchester, Boston	Ashmont	August 26, 1929	MBTA subway: Red Line; MBTA bus: 18, 21, 22, 23, 24, 26, 215, 217, 240; BAT: 12
Dorchester, Boston	Cedar Grove	August 26, 1929	
Dorchester, Boston	Butler	October 7, 1931	
Milton	Milton	August 26, 1929	MBTA bus: 217
Milton	Central Avenue	December 21, 1929	MBTA bus: 240; BAT: 12
Milton	Valley Road	December 21, 1929	
Milton	Capen Street	September 1930	
Mattapan, Boston	Mattapan	December 21, 1929	MBTA bus: 24, 28, 29, 30, 31, 33, 245, 716

== Accidents ==
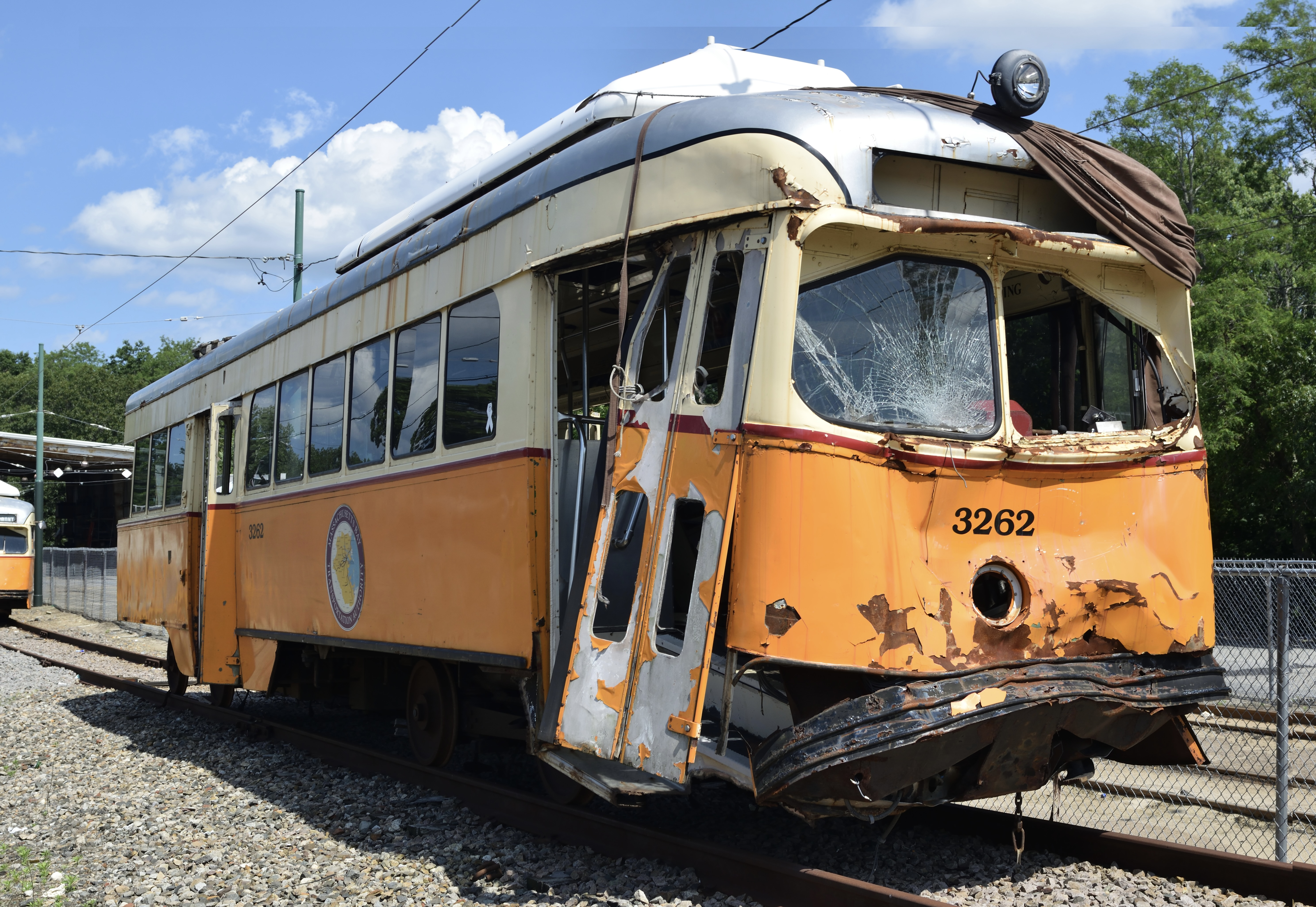
Streetcar #3262, which was wrecked in December 2017

On March 20, 1979, three trolleys collided between Central Avenue and Valley Road stations. The first two trolleys had stopped to avoid a police car, which had become stuck on the tracks while the officer was investigating teenagers drinking near the line. A third trolley was unable to stop in time while approaching around a blind curve; it slammed into the first two trolleys, causing injuries, but no deaths.

Using funding from the American Recovery and Reinvestment Act of 2009, the MBTA conducted a pilot test of technology similar to a collision avoidance system in an automobile, using radar and increasingly fast beeping to warn train operators of obstacles ahead. Like positive train control, it would stop the train if the driver did not take action to avoid an impending collision. If successful, the system would be considered for deployment on the Green Line, where multiple collisions had occurred in recent years.

On November 26, 2014, an out-of-service streetcar collided with an in-service streetcar near Cedar Grove. Seven people were injured.

On December 29, 2017, a collision between two in-service streetcars caused 17 injuries. The accident, caused by operator error, reduced the line to five operable streetcars.

== Rolling stock ==
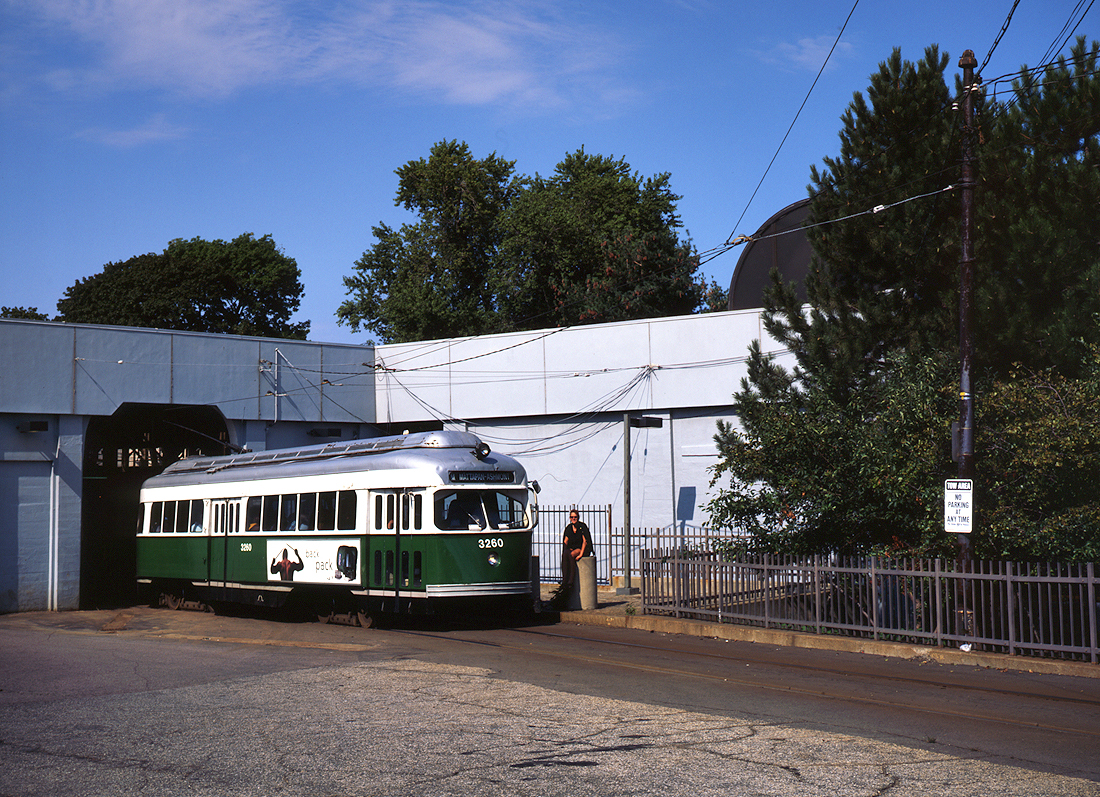
PCC streetcar 3260 in the older green paint scheme at Ashmont in 1999

The rolling stock consists of rebuilt PCC streetcars, which were formerly part of a fleet shared with the Green Line. The historic rolling stock is retained largely because the line, built for 1920s streetcars, would have to be substantially rebuilt to accommodate the heavier modern cars used on the Green Line. In order to clear the line of snow, the MBTA maintains a jet engine–powered snowblower, officially the Portec RMC Hurricane Jet Snow Blower, model RP-3, dubbed "Snowzilla". Snowzilla weighs 26,000 pounds (12,000 kg), measures 8 by 12 by 27 feet, and is powered by a Westinghouse J34 turbojet engine. It uses approximately 500 US gallons (1,900 L; 420 imp gal) of jet fuel per line clearing run. Other T lines simply run regular trains to clear the tracks of snow, but the PCC cars' traction motors would short out if they were used for that purpose.

The current set of PCC cars are "Wartime" PCCs, built by Pullman-Standard in 1945–46. They have been in continuous revenue service in Boston since their construction, although PCC cars were not assigned to the Mattapan Line until 1955. The current fleet was rebuilt as part of a systemwide PCC rebuild program in 1978–83, and again in 1999–2005. During the latter rebuild, the cars were repainted from their former Green Line paint scheme to a brighter orange and cream design, similar to their original coloring. The cars also carry a unique geographic MBTA logo, reminiscent of the old Metropolitan Transit Authority map logo found on the cars between 1948 and 1955. Air-conditioning was added to the PCC cars in 2008.

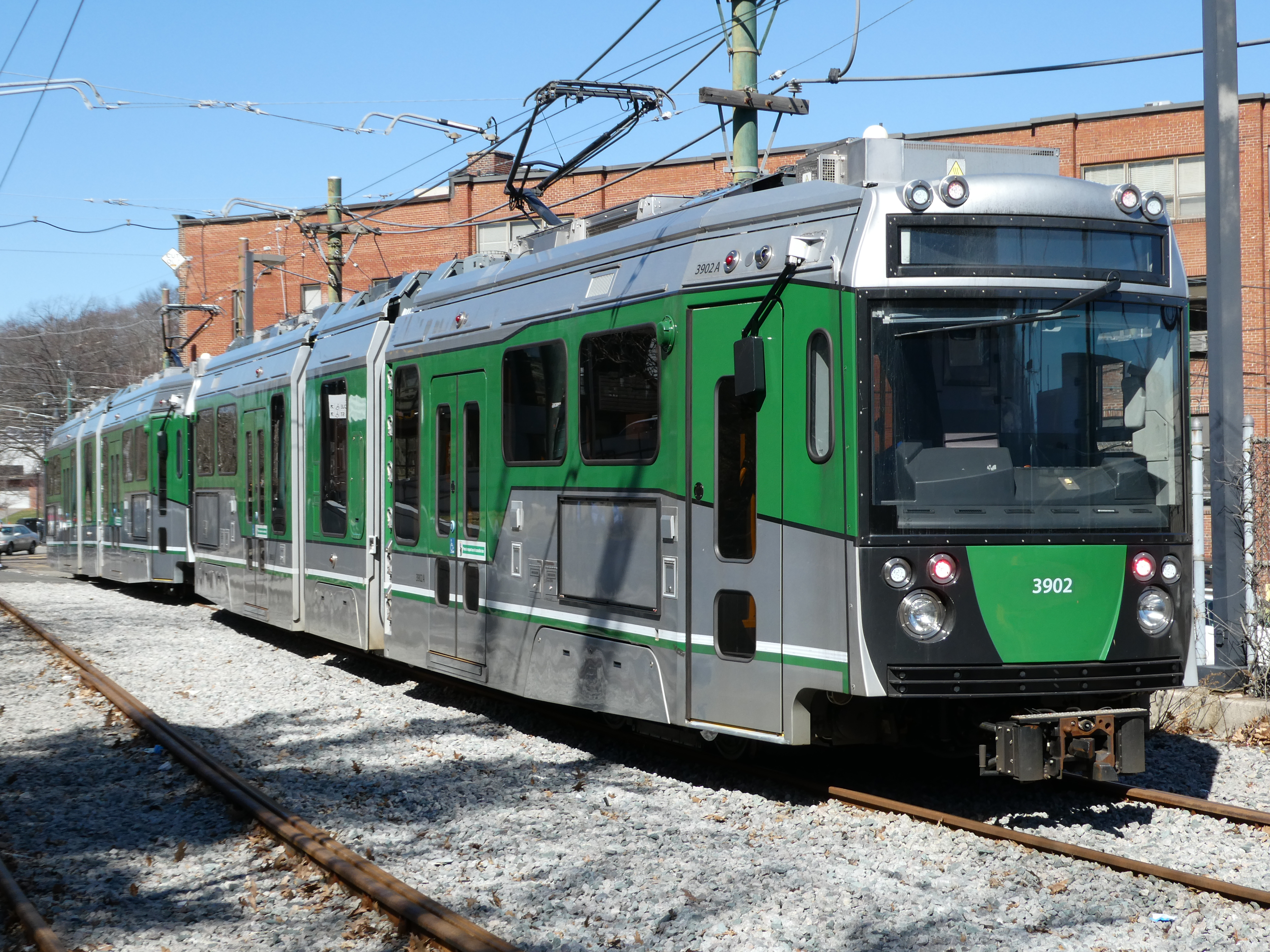
Type 9 LRVs on the Green Line; these are planned to replace the PCC streetcars

On several occasions, the MBTA has proposed to replace the PCC streetcars either with newer trolleys or with buses, and has met with substantial community opposition on each occasion. The FY2017–FY2021 Capital Investment Plan, approved by the MassDOT board in June 2016, allocated $9 million to the line including $3.7 million for maintaining the PCC cars. The plan also allocated $5 million for "PCC Car Replacement-Alternative Service" which was to be used for future funding should an alternate form of transportation be decided upon. In 2017, MBTA began a $7.9 million project to overhaul the trolleys and update the propulsion systems, but further problems such as fluctuations in power damaged the four operating trains in early 2018. On February 5, 2018, it was reported that eight more trolleys were going to re-enter service in 2019, the fixes will prolong the lifespan of the trains by another 7 to 8 years. After several delays, the first rebuilt trolley entered service in March 2022.

The MBTA also announced in 2018 that it was studying alternatives again to running trolleys. Alternatives that were being considered were further repairs of the existing PCC cars, procurement of new replicas of historic cars, and turning the line into a busway. Local politicians and citizens who live along the line have voiced their concerns over the potential conversion of the line into a busway and prefer that the route be maintained as using rail technology. In January 2019, eventual conversion for use of new light rail vehicles (or Type 9 LRVs transferred from the Green Line) was reported to be the most viable option. As of 2024, the MBTA plans to have Type 9 LRVs replace the PCC streetcars.

=== Fleet ===
The Mattapan Line fleet of PCC streetcars consist of ten units, of which six are in service. Of the six in service, four have been rebuilt.

Car #	Image	Status	Rebuilt?
3087		Held for propulsion work	No
3230		Held for truck work	No
3234		Active	Yes
3238		Active	Yes
3254		In testing, to re-enter service	Yes
3260		Active; Rear end replaced after 12/2017 collision	Yes
3262		Wrecked beyond repair after collision in 12/2017. Rear end removed to repair 3260, although not used. To be scrapped at a later date.	No
3263		Active	No
3265		Active	Yes
3268		Active	No
