= Central Avenue station (MBTA) =

Light rail station in Milton, Massachusetts, US

Central Avenue
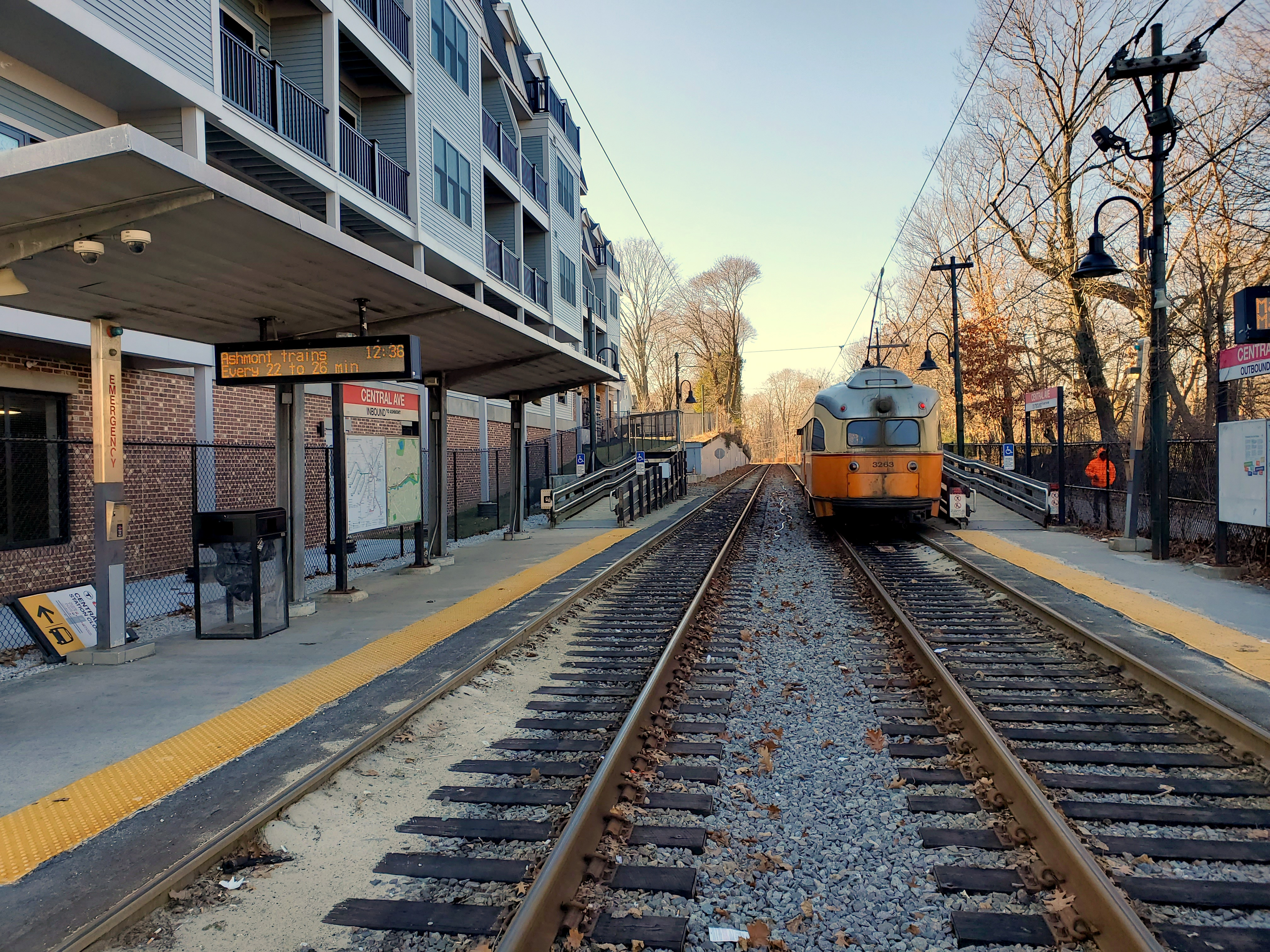
- An outbound streetcar at Central Avenue station in 2022

General information
- Location: 23 Central Avenue; Milton, Massachusetts
- Coordinates: 42.27002°N 71.07352°W
- Line: Milton Branch
- Platforms: 2 side platforms
- Tracks: 2
- Connections: MBTA bus: 240; BAT: 12

Construction
- Accessible: Yes

History
- Opened: 1877
- Rebuilt: June 19, 1882; August 24–December 21, 1929; June 24, 2006–December 22, 2007

Passengers
- 2025: 831 daily boardings

Services
Preceding station	MBTA	Following station
Valley Road toward Mattapan	Mattapan Line	Milton toward Ashmont
Former services
Preceding station	New York, New Haven and Hartford Railroad	Following station
Mattapan Terminus	Boston–Mattapan	Milton toward Boston
Location

Central Avenue station is a light rail station located off Central Avenue near Eliot Street in Milton, Massachusetts. It serves the Mattapan Line, a branch of the MBTA Red Line. Central Avenue consists of two side platforms which serve the Ashmont–Mattapan High Speed Line's two tracks.

== History ==
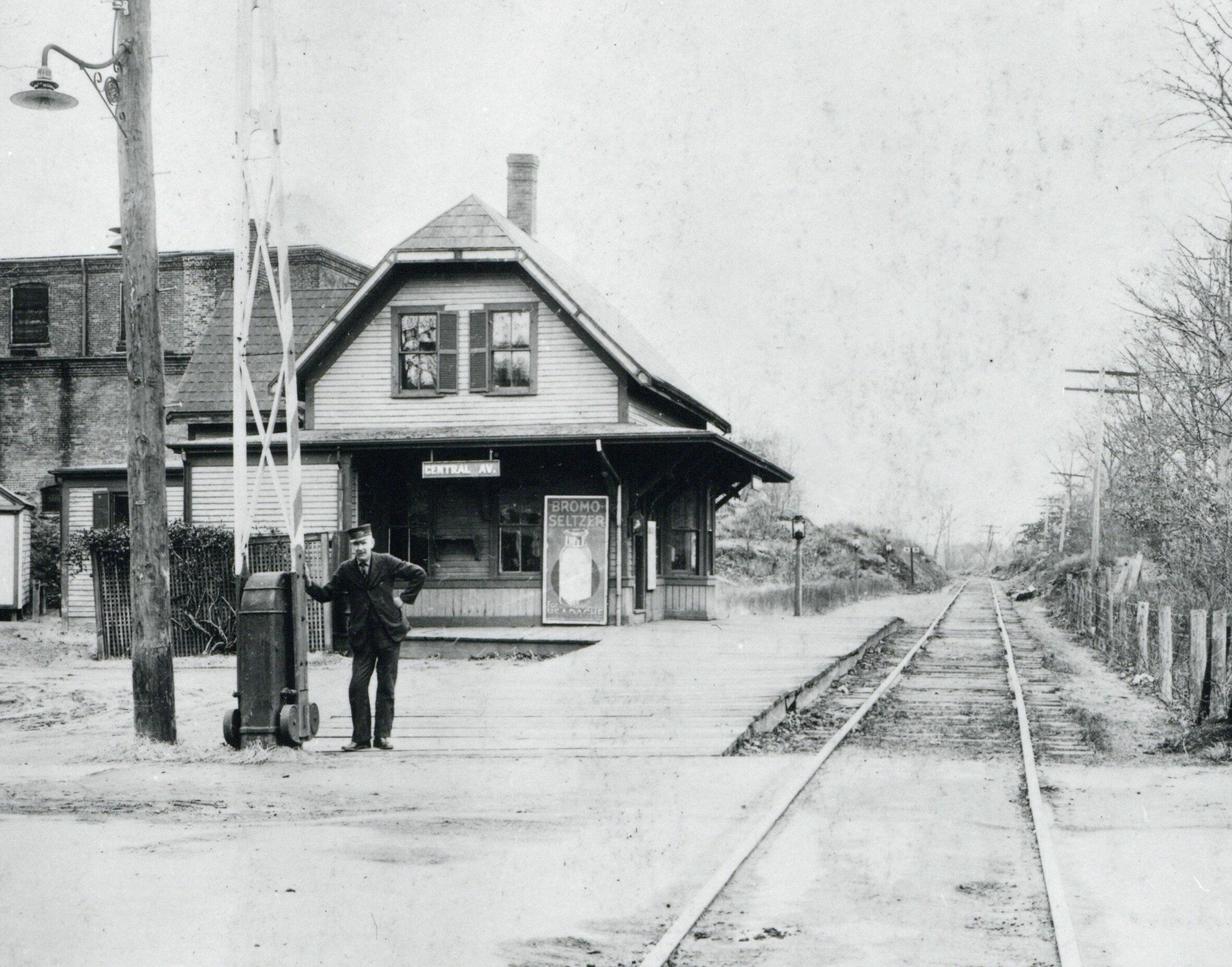
Central Avenue station in January 1928

The Dorchester and Milton Branch Railroad opened across northern Milton on December 1, 1847, and became part of the Old Colony Railroad system the next year. In 1876–77, a bridge over the Neponset River was built to connect Central Avenue in Milton with River Street in Dorchester. The Old Colony added a flag stop with a waiting shelter at Central Avenue in 1877. It became a regular station on June 19, 1882, with a wooden station building added.

Passenger service on the Milton Branch ended on August 24, 1929, for conversion of the line to rapid transit. The first segment of the Mattapan Line, a "high-speed" streetcar line, opened between Ashmont and Milton two days later. The second segment, between Milton and Mattapan with an intermediate stop at Central Avenue, opened on December 21, 1929. East of Shawmut Junction, the Milton Branch remained in use for freight service. Freight tracks flanked the streetcar tracks west of Shawmut Junction; the north track ran as far as Central Avenue to serve the nearby Baker Chocolate factory. The MTA began charging for parking at its stations, including Central Avenue, on November 2, 1953.

The line was closed for renovations from June 24, 2006, to December 22, 2007. During the closure, all stations on the line were modernized and (except for Valley Road) made accessible. Central Avenue station received new platforms and canopies, with wooden ramps for accessibility.

The MBTA plans to convert the line to modern light rail equipment. All stations would have raised platforms for level boarding on the new vehicles; the inbound platform at Central Avenue would be moved to the east side of the grade crossings. Construction cost for Central Avenue station was estimated as $9.5 million in 2023.
