= Dorchester and Milton Branch Railroad =

Former rail line in Massachusetts, US

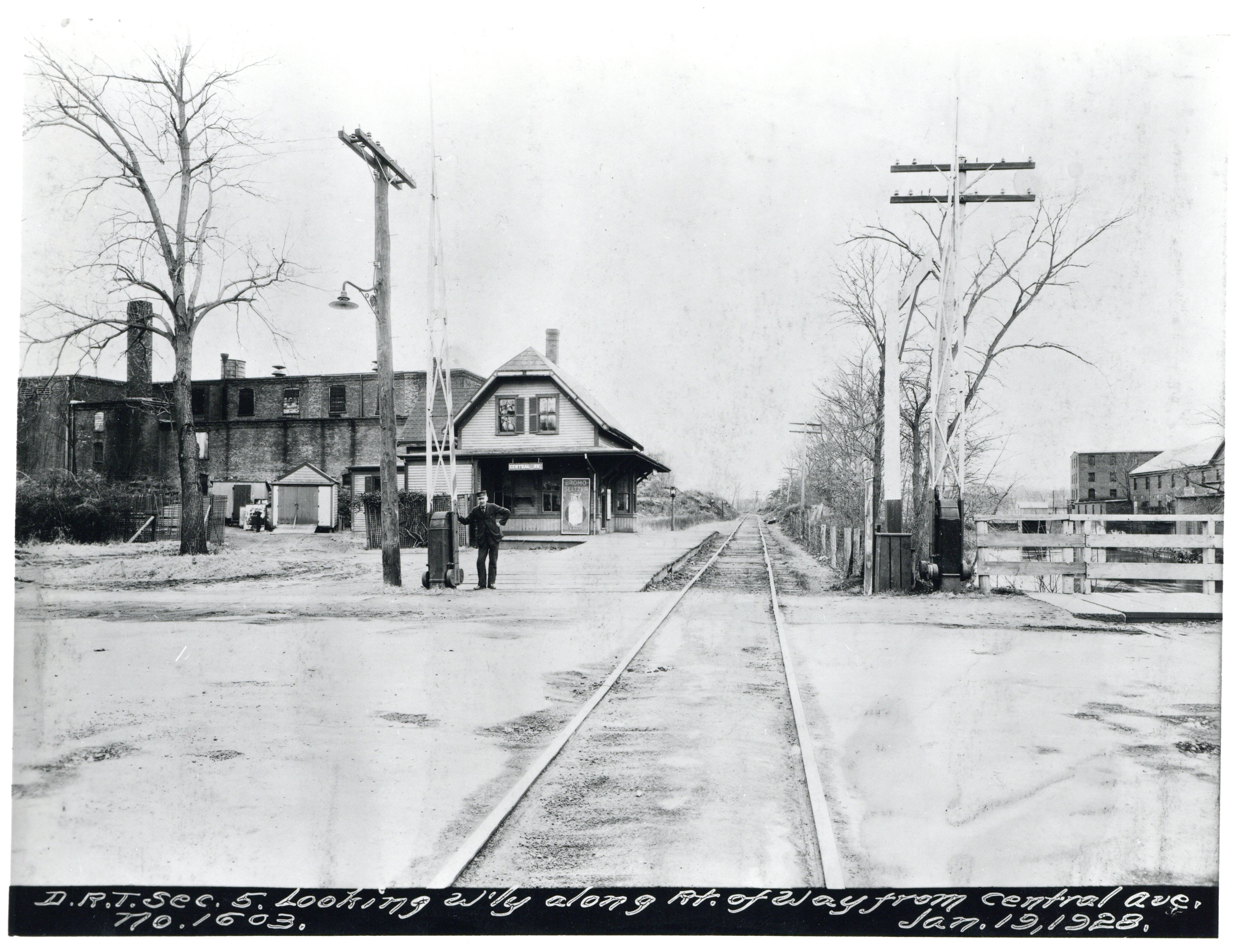
- The Milton Branch at Central Avenue station in 1928

Overview
- Other name(s): Milton Branch

The Dorchester and Milton Branch Railroad was a railroad in Massachusetts. It ran between Neponset Village in Dorchester, Massachusetts, through the town of Milton to the village of Mattapan. It was opened in 1847 and became part of the Old Colony Railroad system in 1848. The western portion was converted to a streetcar line in 1929, while the eastern portion remained in use for freight until the 1980s.

== History ==
It was incorporated in 1846 as a branch off the Old Colony Railroad main line from Boston to Plymouth. The 3.3-mile (5.3 km) road was completed on December 1, 1847.

The line was leased to the Old Colony Railroad from January 1, 1848 to January 1, 1856, and operated under contract by the Old Colony from 1856 to 1863, when it was merged into the Old Colony and Fall River Railroad Company. In 1893, it became part of the New York, New Haven and Hartford Railroad as part of the lease of the entire Old Colony Railroad network.

In 1854 an extension of approximately 0.5 miles (0.80 km) west-southwest was proposed, which would have extended the line from the Mattapan to a connection with the Boston and New York Central railroad (today's Fairmount Line) approximately midway between today's Blue Hill Avenue station and the River Street crossing. This extension was never built.

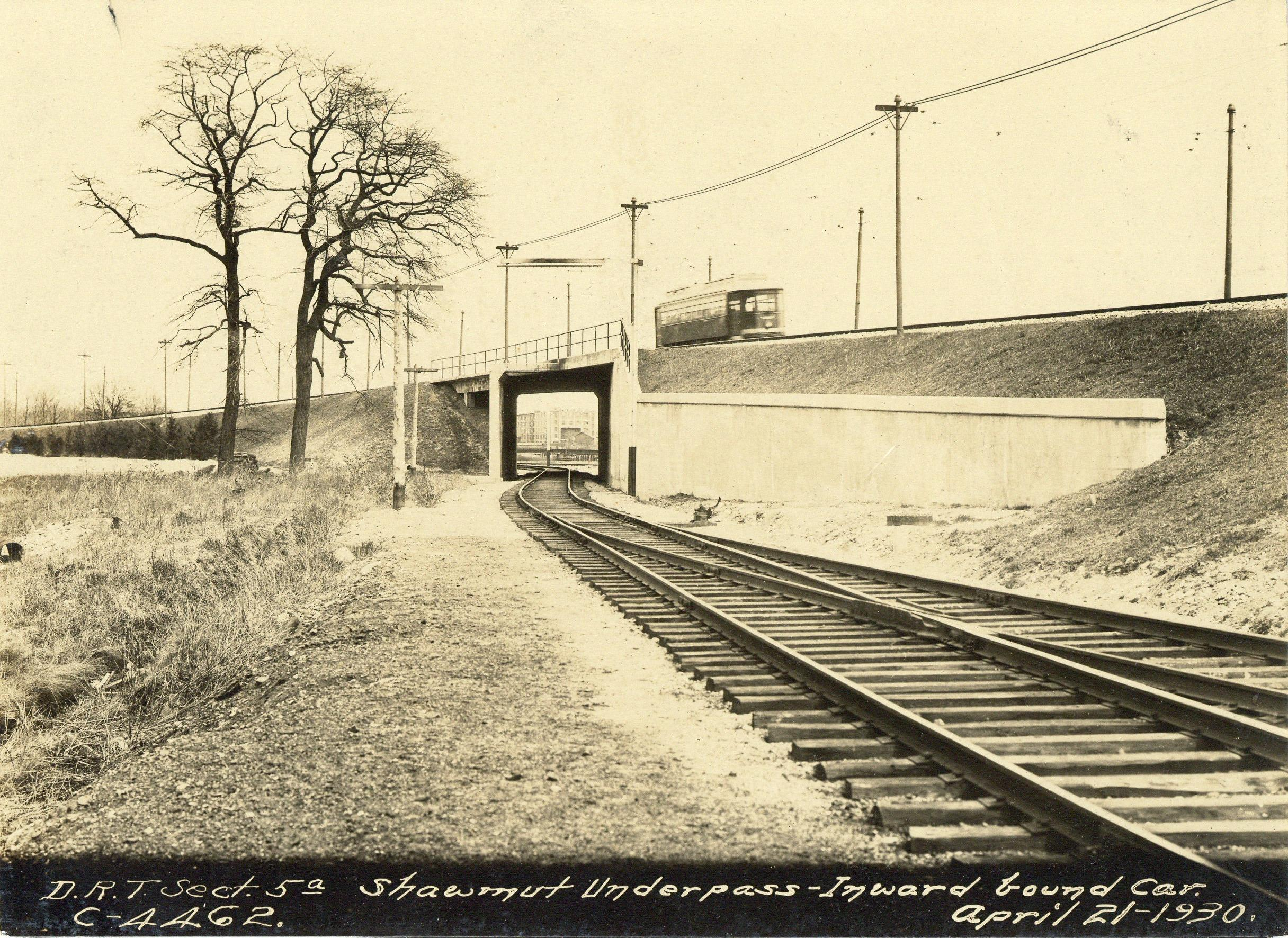
Milton Branch freight tracks pass under the high-speed trolley line at Shawmut Junction in 1930

From 1848 to 1872, commuter rail service to Ashmont operated over the whole line (as the Milton Branch). When the Shawmut Branch Railroad opened in 1872, Mattapan commuter service was diverted over the new line, and the Milton Branch east of Shawmut Junction saw little passenger traffic. After the Shawmut Branch was closed on September 6, 1926 for construction of the Dorchester Extension, all Mattapan passenger and freight service was rerouted via Neponset over the Milton Branch. Local residents lobbied for the restoration of a flag stop at the Granite Avenue (Granite Bridge) station to serve the Cedar Grove and Ashmont neighborhoods, a request granted in October 1926.

The first section of the Ashmont–Mattapan High-Speed Line opened from Ashmont to Milton on August 26, 1929. The high-speed trolley line entered the center of the Milton Branch right of way on a flyover, and ran to Milton flanked by the Milton Branch tracks. Commuter rail service ended when the trolley line reached Milton, over the protests of Milton residents who wanted limited service kept while the trolley line was extended to Mattapan. After four more months of construction, the full trolley line was opened to Mattapan on December 21, 1929.

Freight service was retained on the line as far as Milton until the 1980s. The Neponset Trail, a multi-use rail trail, was later built on the right-of-way from Neponset Avenue to Central Avenue. From Shawmut Junction to Central Avenue, the trail shares the corridor with the MBTA trolley line, and occupies only the former northern freight track. An extension of the trail to Mattapan, paralleling the line to the north, opened in 2017.
