= Red Blue Connector =

Proposed subway in Boston

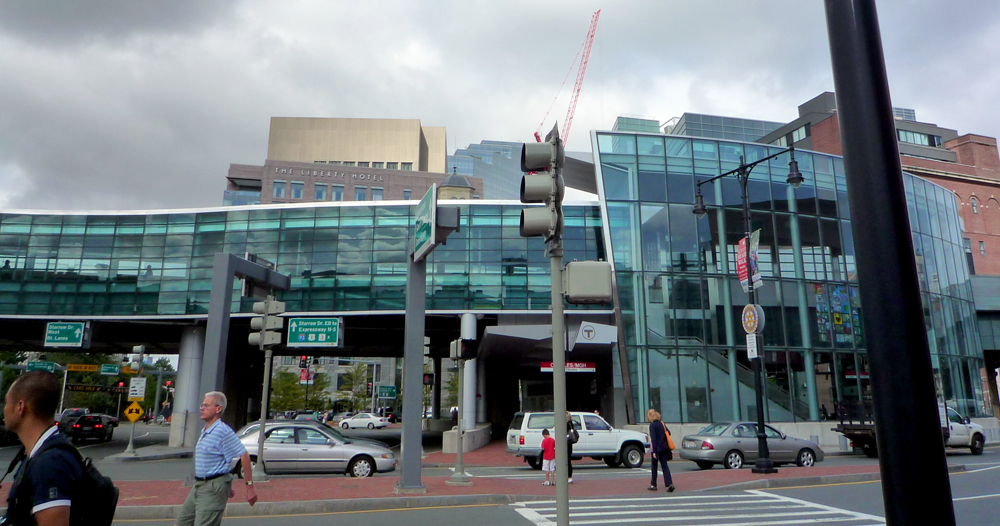
- Charles/MGH station, the proposed terminus of the extension

Overview
- Status: Proposed
- Owner: MBTA
- Locale: Boston, Massachusetts
- Termini: Government Center; Charles/MGH
- Stations: 1 proposed

Service
- Type: Rapid transit
- System: MBTA subway
- Operator: MBTA
- Daily ridership: 12,000 (estimated)

Technical
- Line length: 1,500 feet (460 m)
- Track gauge: 4 ft 8 1/2 in (1,435 mm)
- Electrification: Third rail, 600 V DC

The Red Blue Connector is a proposed construction project to extend the Massachusetts Bay Transportation Authority (MBTA) Blue Line west to connect to the Red Line, which are the only two MBTA subway lines that lack a direct connection. It would extend the Blue Line 0.4 mi (0.64 km) west beyond the current terminus at Bowdoin station to a new terminus at Charles/MGH station, eliminating the former as a result. The project is suggested to relieve pressure on Downtown Boston stations, overcrowding on the Green Line (which is currently the most convenient way to transfer between the two lines), and to connect communities unlinked by public transit, including Cambridge and East Boston.

An underground connection between the Blue Line and the Red Line has been considered since the 1920s. However, the connector idea did not gain serious traction until the early 1970s. Progress of any kind on the proposed project was mostly stagnant until 1991, when the Commonwealth of Massachusetts agreed to build a direct connection between the two lines as part of the Big Dig highway project. Along with several other transit projects promised during the Big Dig, the connector was never constructed, and the project was briefly put on hold between 2005 and 2006. In the 2010s, continued interest in the project resulted in a renewed effort to design and build the connector. The lack of progress on the connector has been controversial, as the project has been repeatedly delayed or put on hold despite a significant amount of support from politicians and the public. As of 2024, design is funded through 30%, but no construction funding has been allocated to the project.

== Background ==
The Blue Line and Red Line are currently the only two MBTA subway rail lines without a direct connection; passengers must either ride one stop on the Green (or Orange) lines to transfer, or walk 0.5 miles (0.80 km) on Cambridge Street between Bowdoin and Charles/MGH.

The Green Line has been the most convenient way to transfer between the Blue Line and the Red Line, causing the segment of the line between Government Center and Park Street to be exceptionally congested, notably during peak travel times. This frequently causes significant delays on the Green Line. It currently takes an average of 11 minutes to travel between Government Center and Charles/MGH during rush hour, by way of the Green and Red lines. The Blue-Red connector is estimated to save riders 4 minutes on average between Government Center and Charles/MGH.

=== Former connection ===
A physical rail connection between the Red and Blue Lines existed in the early part of the 20th century (prior to the MBTA assigning the color designations of the subway lines). Railcars from what is today the Blue Line could emerge from a ramp portal surfacing between Joy Street and Russell Street, just beyond Bowdoin station. The railcars would run on former streetcar track down Cambridge Street and then most of the distance to the western end of the Longfellow Bridge, connecting to what is now the Red Line just east of its Cambridge subway portal, near what is now Kendall/MIT station. Because the tracks were unpowered, individual cars had to be towed along the street at night. This connection was never used in passenger service, but was used to transport Blue Line cars to the Eliot Street Yard maintenance shops then located near Harvard Square station. When the Blue Line eventually got its own maintenance shops, the connection was removed and the ramp portal was permanently covered in 1952.

== Route and design ==
=== Tunnel ===
The connector would be located in a tunnel underneath Cambridge Street, entirely within the city of Boston. Various construction methods have been considered over the years, including cut-and-cover (C&C), sequential excavation method (SEM), and a deep-bore tunnel constructed using a tunnel boring machine (TBM). The project was originally conceived as a cut-and-cover tunnel, although there has been significant concern regarding surface-level disruption to Cambridge Street if a cut-and-cover tunnel is to be constructed. A deep-bore tunnel was the preferred construction method from 2010 until 2018 when a deep-bore tunnel was ultimately ruled out in favor of a shallow cut-and-cover tunnel.

=== Stations ===
As of 2024, only one station is planned as part of the connector. An underground Blue Line platform at Charles/MGH is planned to be built underneath Cambridge Street to the east of the main headhouse. This will provide a direct transfer between the Blue and Red lines without passengers having to exit fare control.

Bowdoin station is planned to be closed if the connector is constructed, due to construction costs and travel time savings. However, prior iterations of the project included a rebuilt or untouched Bowdoin station. Recent plans for the connector indicated that Bowdoin station is planned to serve as a staging area during construction if the connector is built.

== Connector proposals ==
=== Early planning ===
An extension of the East Boston Tunnel to Charles Street was considered in a 1924 study of Charles station. A 1926 proposal to convert the Tremont Street subway and connecting streetcar lines into a pair of rapid transit trunk lines called for the East Boston Tunnel to be extended south to Park Street station, with through service running between Maverick Square and Brighton using the Commonwealth Avenue line. (Three potential alignments were considered: one running south from Bowdoin, and two running southwest from a relocated Scollay Under.)

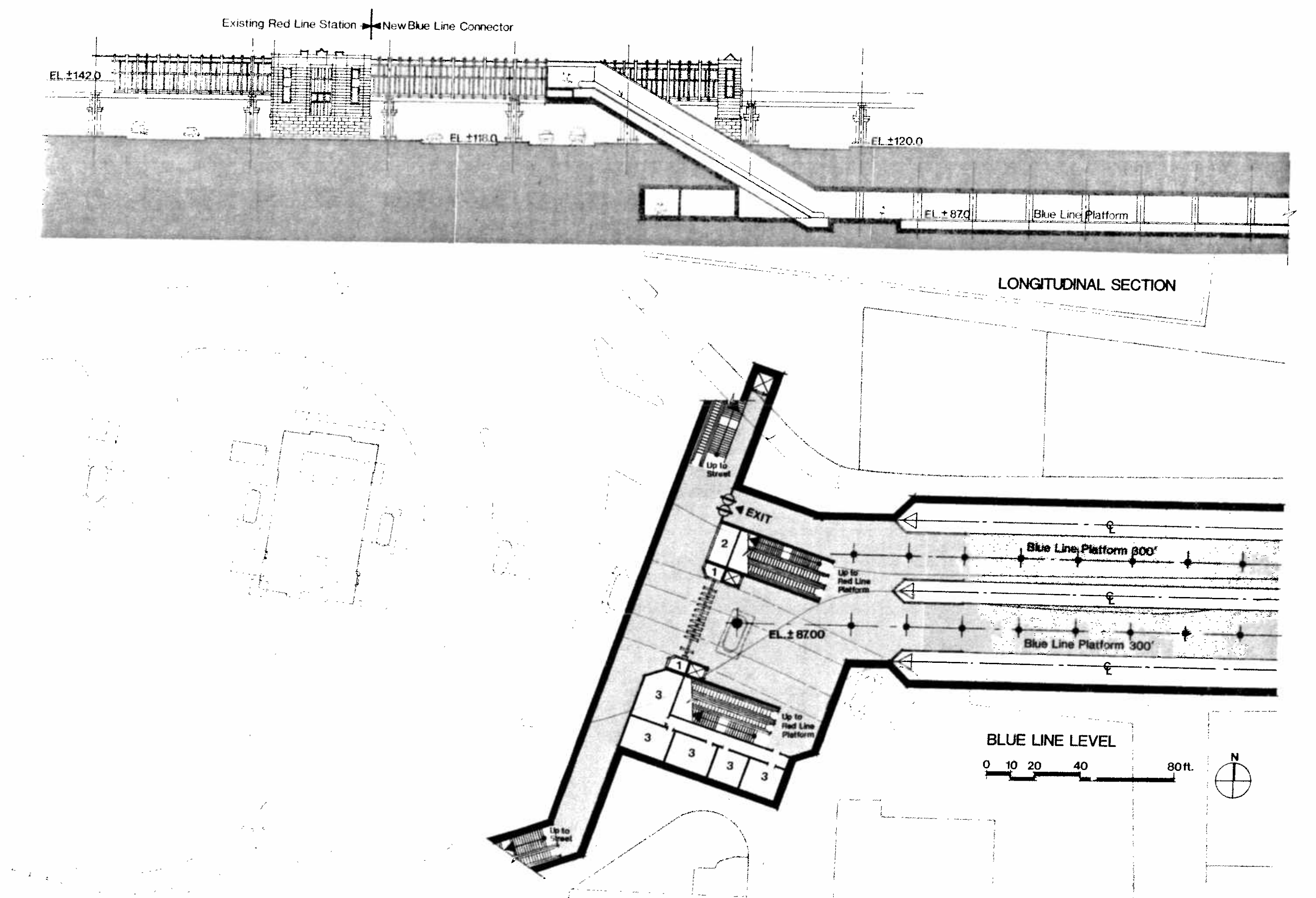
One of three potential designs for the Blue Line level at Charles/MGH from the 1986 study

Regional transportation plans from the 1940s to the early 1970s focused on suburban extensions, with no downtown extension past Bowdoin. By the mid-1970s, the rise of Kendall Square as a major employment center, the coming of the Red Line extension to Alewife, and increased traffic to and from Logan Airport created enough demand to justify a direct connection between the Red and Blue lines. A 1974 state plan again proposed an extension to Park Street, while the 1978 and 1983 Program for Mass Transportation updates called for an extension to Charles/MGH instead.

A 1986 MBTA feasibility study for an extension to Charles/MGH evaluated a cut-and-cover tunnel beginning west of Bowdoin Street with no changes to Bowdoin station. The project was then estimated to cost $79–95 million (equivalent to $197–236 million in 2025). A 1987 cost-effectiveness study estimated 9,030 daily one-way trips over the extension.

=== Big Dig ===
In 1991, the state agreed to build a set of transit projects as part of an agreement with the Conservation Law Foundation (CLF), which had threatened a lawsuit over auto emissions from the Central Artery/Tunnel Project (Big Dig). Among these projects was the Red Line–Blue Line connector, which was to be complete by the end of 2011. The reconstruction of Charles/MGH station (rebuilt 2003–2007) was designed to accommodate a future Blue Line platform to the east of the existing headhouse. However, the project was put on hold in 2005 to prioritize other projects providing similar air quality improvements. After another lawsuit from the CLF in 2006, the state agreed to finish designing the connector.

The 2010 Draft Environmental Impact Report (DEIR) instead called for a pair of deeper tunnels bored by a tunnel boring machine (TBM), starting east of Bowdoin station and passing underneath the existing platform. Alternatives with a replacement Bowdoin station west of Bowdoin Street, and without a replacement station, were considered; the latter was recommended due to lower cost and reduced travel time. Keeping Bowdoin station and loop was ruled out because evacuation from a disabled train would not be possible in the confined loop, and the eastbound platform is not long enough for six-car trains. Use of a TBM rather than cut-and-cover construction was intended to reduce construction cost and limit disruption on Cambridge Street.

Lacking available funding for design and construction, the MBTA did not complete the design of the extension. The possibility of a public-private partnership (P3) to advance the project was considered in 2013. In 2015, the EPA removed the requirement for the MBTA to complete design.

=== Project redesign ===
In 2018, the state commissioned a $50,000 study to reevaluate tunneling methods and their associated costs; it found that contrary to the 2010 DEIR, cut-and-cover tunneling could be considerably less costly than a TBM, albeit with more surface disruption. Cut-and-cover was estimated to cost $200–250 million for the tunnel costs alone, compared to $300–350 million for TBM and the $413 million estimated in the DEIR. An MBTA long-range planning document from June 2018 considered a pedestrian tunnel between the Orange Line platforms at State and Downtown Crossing, which would allow transfers between the Red and Blue lines similar to (though considerably longer than) the Winter Street Concourse between the Green and Orange lines. In 2019 and 2023, the MBTA indicated plans to spend $15 million to design the connector in a five-year spending plan.

A conceptual design completed in 2020 called for cut-and-cover construction, with Bowdoin station still planned for closure. The new Blue Line platform at Charles/MGH would have egresses from the existing lobby and an under-construction MGH development on the north side of Charles Street. Total project cost was estimated as $850 million ($740 million for construction including 30% contingency, $50 million for design, $30 million in administration costs, and $30 million for additional rolling stock), with construction lasting from 2025 to 2030. A Notice of Project Change (NPC) was issued on October 2, 2023. In November 2023, the Massachusetts Executive Office of Energy and Environmental Affairs required the MBTA to prepare a Supplemental Draft Environmental Impact Report (SDEIR).

The project has $30M in programmed funding to complete 30% of the design and environmental review. As of June 2024, the connector lacks funding for 100% design and construction.
