= Beames =

Beames is a surname. Notable people with the surname include:

- Adrienne Beames (1942–2018), Australian long-distance runner
- H. P. M. Beames (1875–1948), British mechanical engineer
- Jack Beames (1890–1970), Welsh rugby union and rugby league player
- John Beames (1837–1902), British civil servant, writer, historian and linguist
- Margaret Beames (1935–2016), New Zealand writer
- Percy Beames (1911–2004), Australian rules footballer and cricketer
- Peter Beames (born 1963), Australian triple jumper

== See also ==
- Abraham Beame (1906–2001), American politician
- Beams (disambiguation)
