= MBTA subway =

Boston region transit service

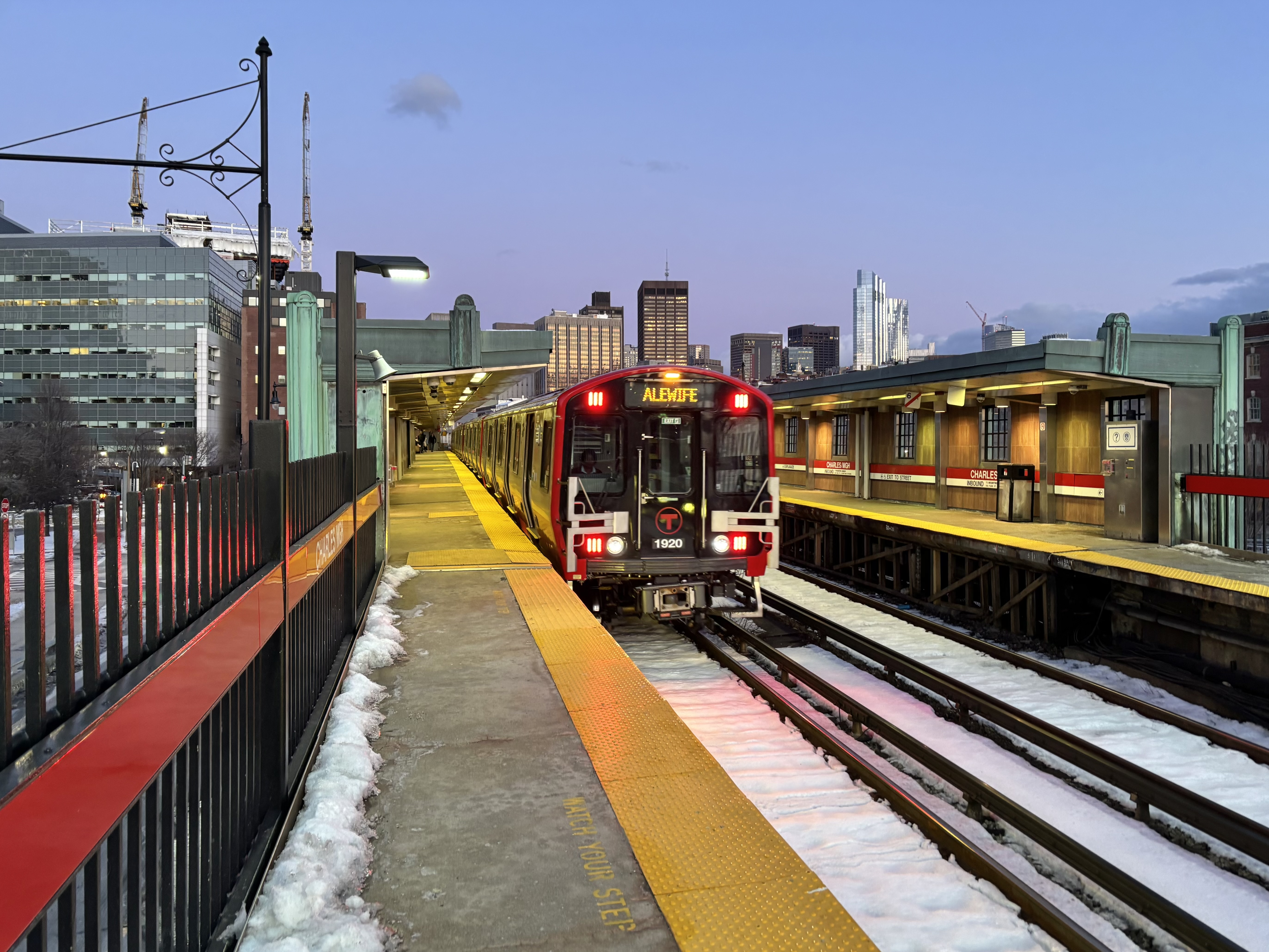
- Red Line train entering Charles/MGH station in 2025

Overview
- Locale: Greater Boston, Massachusetts
- Number of lines: 3 heavy rail (Red, Orange, Blue); 2 light rail (Green, Mattapan); 1 bus rapid transit (Silver)
- Number of stations: 152 (list of stations)
- Annual ridership: 101,054,600 (heavy rail, 2025); 42,065,000 (light rail, 2025)
- Website: mbta.com

Operation
- Began operation: September 1, 1897 (Tremont Street subway)
- Operator: Massachusetts Bay Transportation Authority (MBTA)
- Train length: 6 cars (rapid transit); 1-3 cars (light rail)

Technical
- System length: 68.7 mi (110.6 km) – rail

The Massachusetts Bay Transportation Authority (MBTA) operates rapid transit (heavy rail), light rail, and bus rapid transit services in the Boston metropolitan area, collectively referred to as the rapid transit, subway, or the T.

The color-branded lines consist of three heavy rail lines (Red, Orange, and Blue), one branched light rail system (Green), and a short light rail line (the Mattapan Line, colored as part of the Red Line). All except the Ashmont–Mattapan line operate in tunnels in the downtown area, but no route operates entirely underground, and only 31 out of the system's 153 stations are located underground. The five branches of the Silver Line bus network are also shown as part of the rapid transit system. Three branches operate underground and charge rapid transit fares; two branches operate entirely on the surface and charge lower bus fares.

In 2025, the heavy rail lines had 101,054,600 rides, or about 371,800 per weekday in the second quarter of 2026, and comprised the fourth-busiest heavy rail system in the United States. In the same period, the light rail lines had 42,065,000 rides, or about 135,500 per weekday, and comprised the third-busiest light rail system in the United States.

The section of the Tremont Street subway between Park Street and Boylston Street stations, now on the Green Line, opened in 1897, making it the oldest transit subway in North America still in use (preceded only by the short-lived Beach Pneumatic Transit demonstration line in New York City).

== History ==
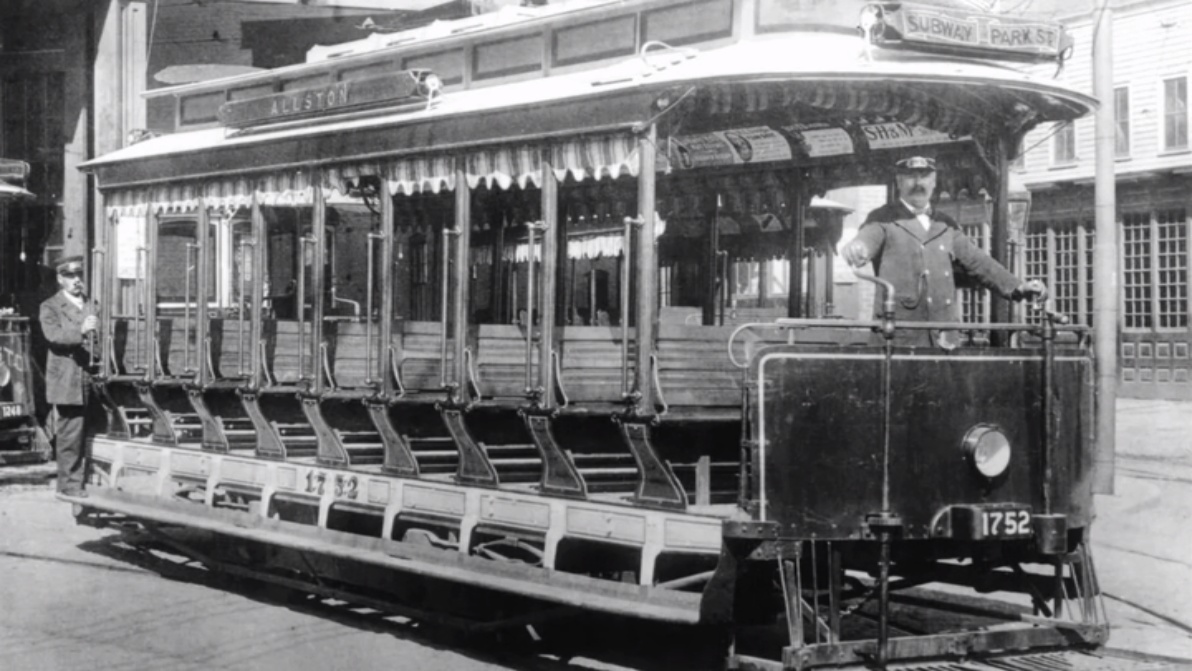
Streetcar number 1752, driven by the veteran motorman Jimmy Reed, is shown here after it became the first revenue car in the Boston subway system on September 1, 1897. This also marked the beginning of subway traffic in the United States.

Opened in September 1897, the four-track-wide segment of the Green Line tunnel between Park Street and Boylston stations was the first subway in the United States, and has been designated a National Historic Landmark. The downtown portions of what are now the Green, Orange, Blue, and Red line tunnels were all in service by 1912. Additions to the rapid transit network occurred in most decades of the 1900s, and continued in the 2000s with the addition of Silver Line bus rapid transit and Green Line Extension. (See MBTA History and MBTA Future plans sections.)

Streetcar congestion in downtown Boston led to the creation of underground subways and elevated rail, the former in 1897 and the latter in 1901. The Tremont Street subway was the first rapid transit tunnel in the United States and had a 24/7 service. The grade-separated railways added transportation capacity while avoiding delays caused by intersections with cross streets. The first elevated railway and the first rapid transit line in Boston were built three years before the first underground line of the New York City Subway, but 34 years after the first London Underground lines, and 29 years after the first elevated railway in New York City.

Various extensions and branches were added to the subway lines at both ends, bypassing more surface tracks. As grade-separated lines were extended, street-running lines were cut back for faster downtown service. The last elevated heavy rail or "El" inter-station segments in Boston – with the exception of the Red Line's still-active elevated tracks, connecting Charles/MGH station over Charles Circle to the Longfellow Bridge and the Cambridge Tunnel's northern portal – were at the extremities of the Orange Line: its northern end was relocated in 1975 from Everett to Malden, MA, and its southern end was relocated into the Southwest Corridor in 1987. However, the Green Line's Causeway Street Elevated remained in service until 2004, when it was relocated into a tunnel with an incline to reconnect to the Lechmere Viaduct.

The final section of elevated, between the Lechmere Viaduct and Lechmere station, was closed in 2020 for construction of the Green Line Extension. The extension opened in two phases in 2022 with new branches from Lechmere to Union Square and Medford/Tufts – the first rail expansion since 1987.

== System ==
=== Lines ===
The rapid transit lines consist of 3 heavy rail (Metro) lines, 2 light rail lines, and a bus rapid transit line. The heavy rail Red Line has two southern branches, while the light rail Green Line has four services (B, C, D, and E) that use four western and two northern branches. The Silver Line has five bus rapid transit routes; two run on Washington Street with different downtown terminals, while three run underground in the Seaport with surface branches.

Line	Route	Inauguration	Type	Route length	Number of stations
Green Line	B: Government Center ↔ Boston College; C: Government Center ↔ Cleveland Circle; D: Union Square ↔ Riverside; E: Medford/Tufts ↔ Heath Street	1897	Light rail	26.7 mi (43.0 km)	69
Orange Line	Oak Grove ↔ Forest Hills	1901	Heavy rail	11 mi (18 km)	20
Blue Line	Wonderland ↔ Bowdoin	1904	Heavy rail	6 mi (9.7 km)	12
Red Line	Alewife ↔ Ashmont; Alewife ↔ Braintree	1912	Heavy rail	22.5 mi (36.2 km)	22
Mattapan Line	Ashmont ↔ Mattapan	1929	Light rail	2.5 mi (4.0 km)	8
Silver Line	SL1: South Station ↔ Logan International Airport; SL2: South Station ↔ Design Center/Drydock; SL3: South Station ↔ Chelsea; SL4: South Station ↔ Nubian Square; SL5: Downtown Crossing ↔ Nubian Square; SLW: South Station ↔ Silver Line Way	2002	Bus rapid transit	—N/a	34
Heavy rail subtotal				39.5 mi (63.6 km)	52 (Note: There are 2 heavy-rail-exclusive stations which act as interchanges and use multiple heavy-rail lines, and were not counted more than once in this total: Downtown Crossing and State.)
Light rail subtotal				29.2 mi (47.0 km)	77 (Note: This subtotal includes counting interchange stations between light and heavy-rail lines multiple times for every line they utilize.)
Total				68.1 mi (109.6 km)	152 (Note: There are 12 stations which act as interchanges: 11 of them connect two lines, and 2 connects three (Downtown Crossing and Park Street). For this reason, these were not counted more than once in this total: Tufts Medical Center, Chinatown, Boylston, Park Street, Downtown Crossing, South Station, State, Government Center, Haymarket, North Station, Airport, and Ashmont.)

==== Coverage ====
To-scale map of the Boston subway system from 2022

All four subway lines cross downtown, forming a quadrilateral configuration, and the Orange and Green Lines (which run approximately parallel in that district) also connect directly at two stations just north of downtown. The Red Line and Blue Line are the only pair of subway lines which do not have a direct transfer connection to each other. Because the various subway lines do not consistently run in any given compass direction, it is customary to refer to line directions as "inbound" or "outbound". Inbound trains travel towards the four downtown transfer stations–Park Street, State Street, Government Center and Downtown Crossing–and outbound trains travel away from these hub stations.

==== Colors ====
Originally, transit lines in the region only used geographic names; though numbering was added to public maps in 1936. The three heavy rail lines were assigned numbers 1, 2, and 3; what is now the Green Line was assigned different numbers for each branch. However, riders generally continued to use the geographic names. Colors were assigned on August 26, 1965, as part of a wider modernization under design standards developed by Cambridge Seven Associates, and have served as the primary identifier for the lines since then. The numbers for the heavy rail lines and the Mattapan Line were retained in public information until 1966. In 1967, the then-current five branches of the Green Line were lettered A through E.

Cambridge Seven originally intended to use red, yellow, green, and blue for the four lines. However, yellow proved unsuitable, since some patrons would have difficulty reading yellow text on a white background; orange was substituted, and yellow eventually was used for the MBTA bus service's visibility markings and signage. When sketching design concepts, Peter Chermayeff labeled the subway-surface light rail routes as the Green Line because they run adjacent to parts of the Emerald Necklace park system. The East Boston Tunnel became the Blue Line because it runs under Boston Harbor, and the Cambridge-Dorchester Tunnel became the Red Line because its northernmost terminus was then at Harvard University, whose school color is crimson. According to Chermayeff, the Main Line El "ended up being orange for no particular reason beyond color balance." The MBTA and transit historians later claimed that orange came from Orange Street, an early name for the street that ran southwards down the Boston Neck to connect the Shawmut Peninsula to the mainland, for what is now part of Washington Street.

=== Stations ===
The MBTA rapid transit system consists of 153 stations, with the 5 most recent stations opening on December 12, 2022 as part of the Medford/Tufts branch of the Green Line Extension project in Somerville.

=== Rolling stock ===
The MBTA is in the process of replacing its entire fleet of Red Line and Orange Line cars, which are over 40 years old, as of 2024. The Blue Line cars were replaced in 2008. The Green Line has a variety of vehicles, some dating back to 1986, with the latest batch delivered in 2019.

All four transit lines use standard-gauge railway tracks (4 ft 8 1/2 in / 1,435 mm) and are electrified at 600V DC, but are otherwise incompatible, with varying loading gauges, car lengths, platform heights, and power collection systems as detailed in the chart below:

MBTA subway car dimensions
Line	Car length	Car width	Platform height	Power
Red	69 ft 6 in (21.2 m)	10 ft (3.05 m)	49 in (1.24 m)	Third rail
Orange	65 ft (19.8 m)	9 ft 3 in (2.82 m)	45 in (1.14 m)	Third rail
Blue	48 ft (14.6 m)	9 ft 3 in (2.82 m)	41 1/2 in (1.05 m)	Third rail, overhead line
Green	72–74 ft (21.9–22.6 m)	8 ft 8 in (2.64 m)	8 in (0.20 m)	Overhead line

There are no direct track connections between lines, except between the Red Line and Mattapan Line, but all except the Blue Line have little-used connections to the national rail network, which have been used for deliveries of railcars and supplies.

== Fares ==
MBTA subway fares are $2.40 regardless of fare medium (CharlieCard, paper ticket, cash, contactless tap to ride), with two transfers on MBTA bus local routes allowed. Daily, weekly, and monthly passes are also available, and MBTA Commuter Rail passes for these time periods are valid for subway fares. MTicket CR Tickets are not valid on bus or subway. Discounted fares are available for groups including adults over 65, people with disabilities, certain schoolchildren, and young adults with low incomes. These fares are typically $1.10. Children under 11, legally blind people, and certain government workers are allowed to ride free of charge.

All Blue, Orange, and Red Line stations are fare controlled with faregates, as are underground Green and Silver Line stations (plus the aboveground Science Park and Riverside stations). Green Line Extension stations require proof of payment verification at a fare machine. All other aboveground Green and Silver Line stations require payment when boarding the vehicle.

== See also ==
- List of metro systems
- List of United States rapid transit systems by ridership
