= Beams =

Beams may refer to:

== Music ==
- Beams (band), a psych-folk band formed in Toronto
- Beams, a 2002 album by Hiromitsu Agatsuma
- Beams (Matthew Dear album), a 2012 album by Matthew Dear
- Beams (The Presets album), a 2005 album by The Presets
- Beams (song), a 1995 single by Kuroyume

== People ==
- Ben Beams (born 1978), Australian rules footballer
- Byron Beams (1929–1992), American football player
- Claye Beams (born 1991), Australian rules footballer
- Dayne Beams (born 1990), Australian rules footballer
- Dovie Beams (1932–2017), American actress
- Jesse Beams (1898–1977), American physicist
- Kristen Beams (born 1984), Australian cricketer
- Mary Beams (born 1945), American artist and animator

== Other ==
- Beams (brand), a Japanese clothing brand.

== See also ==
- Beam (disambiguation)
- Battle of the Beams
- BEAM robotics
- Beam theory
- Beame, surname
