= Bowdoin station =

Subway station in Boston, Massachusetts, US

Bowdoin
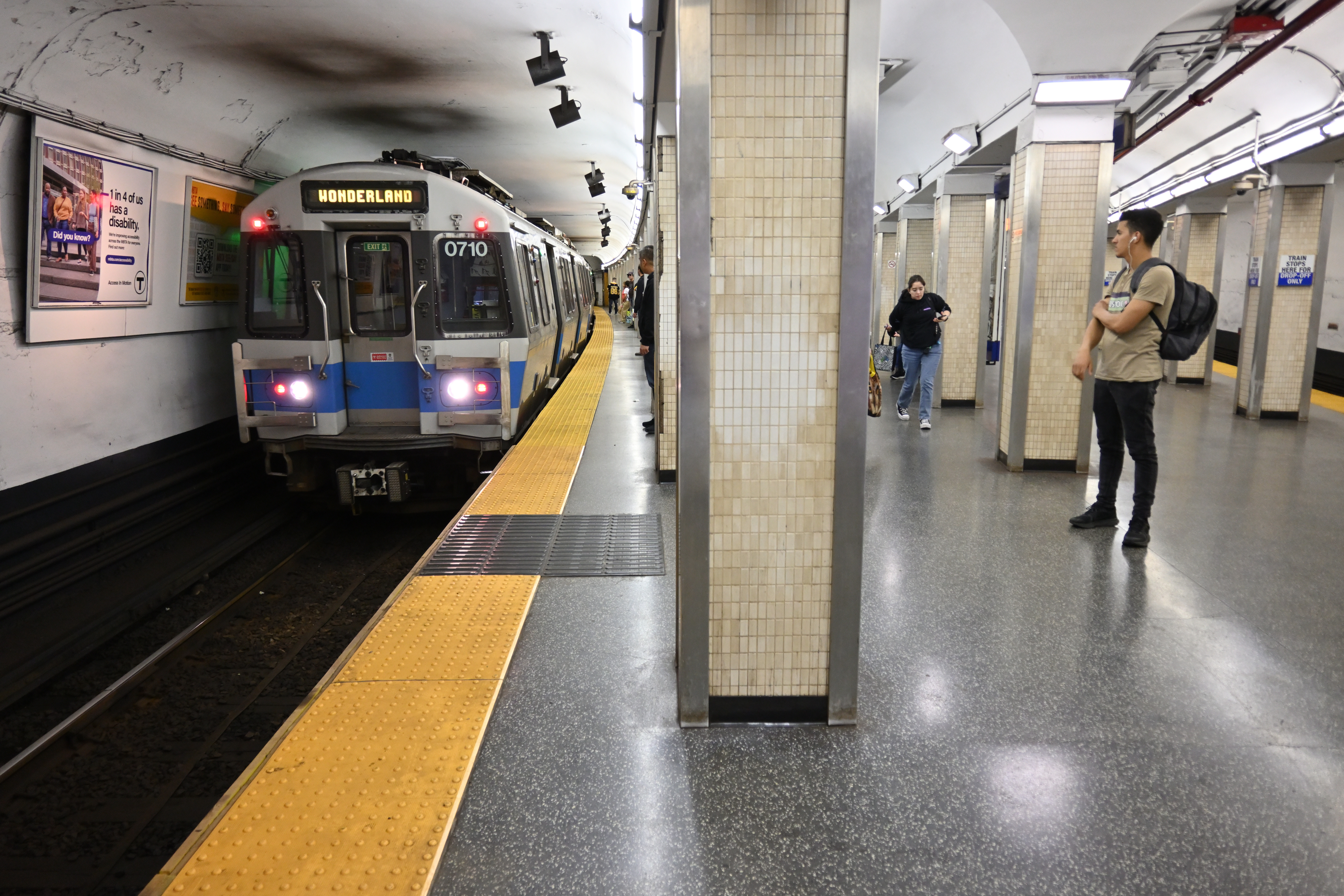
- A Wonderland-bound train at Bowdoin station in 2024

General information
- Location: Cambridge Street at New Chardon Street; Boston, Massachusetts
- Coordinates: 42.3614°N 71.0622°W
- Line: East Boston Tunnel
- Platforms: 1 wedge-shaped island platform
- Tracks: 1 balloon loop

Construction
- Structure type: Underground
- Accessible: No

History
- Opened: March 18, 1916
- Closed: January 3, 1981–January 11, 1982; March 3, 1982–April 20, 1982
- Rebuilt: 1924, 1968

Passengers
- FY2019: 2,127 boardings (weekday average)

Services
Preceding station	MBTA	Following station
Terminus	Blue Line	Government Center toward Wonderland
Track layout
- Cambridge Street is omitted
Location

Bowdoin station (/ˈboʊdɪn/ BOH-din) is a Massachusetts Bay Transportation Authority (MBTA) rapid transit station in Bowdoin Square in Boston, Massachusetts. The station is the downtown terminus of the Blue Line, part of the MBTA subway system. It has a single wedge-shaped island platform located inside a balloon loop. Bowdoin is the only Blue Line station that is not accessible.

Bowdoin opened in 1916 as part of an extension of the East Boston Tunnel, serving as the terminal for streetcar lines from East Boston. The line was converted to use high-floor trains in 1924, with raised platforms constructed at the stations. The station was modernized in 1968, with a new brutalist headhouse designed by Josep Lluís Sert. Bowdoin was closed for two periods in the early 1980s due to budget cuts; it was open for limited hours on weekdays only until 2014, when it returned to full-time service during the reconstruction of nearby Government Center station. The proposed Red Blue Connector would extend the Blue Line west to a Red Line transfer at Charles/MGH station, with Bowdoin station likely eliminated.

== Station design ==
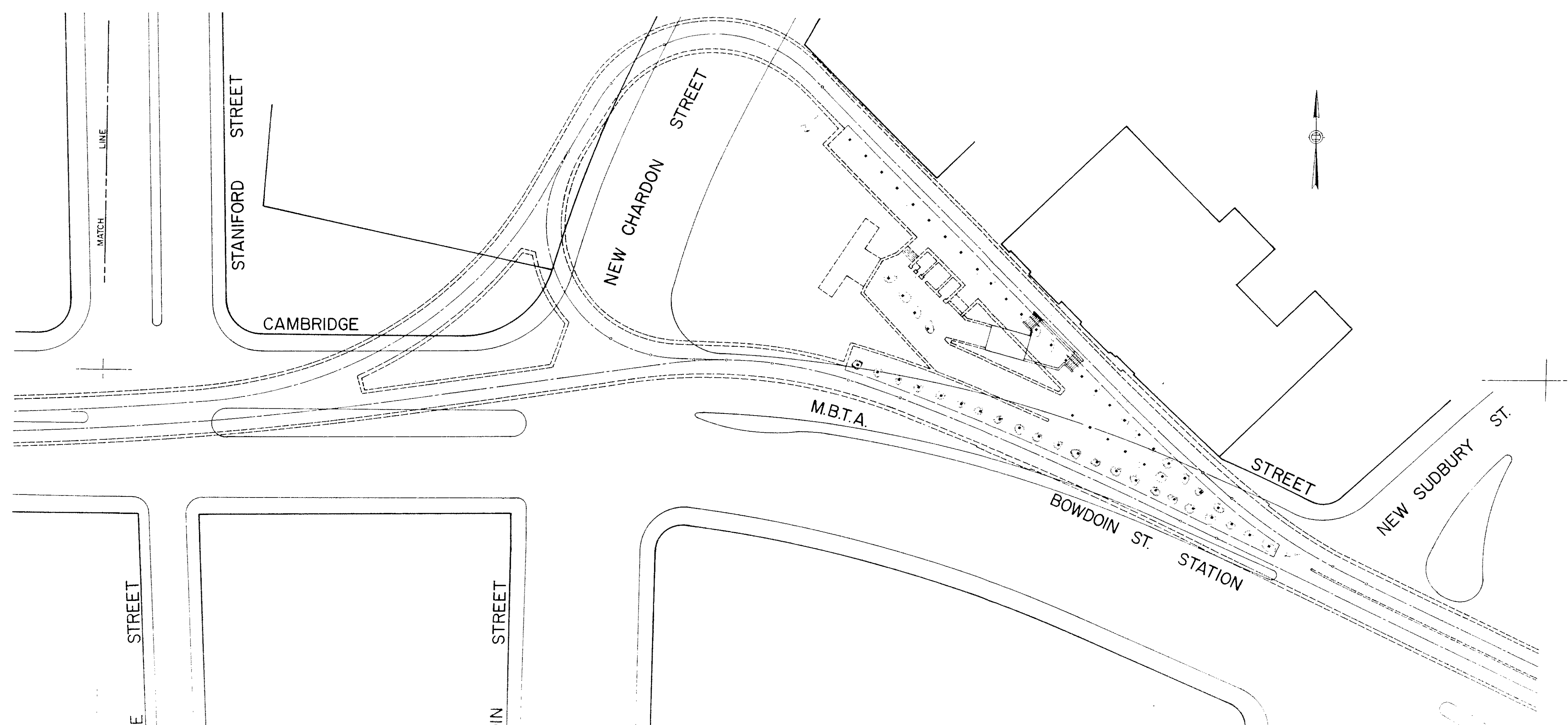
A 1986 plan of the station

The station is located under Cardinal Cushing Memorial Park, a triangular public plaza at the northeast corner of Bowdoin Square – the intersection of Cambridge Street with Bowdoin Street and New Chardon Street, located at the junction of Beacon Hill neighborhood and the Government Center area. The single entrance to the station is near the east end of the park, with a small sunken plaza 4 feet (1.2 m) below the rest of the park and a concrete triangular prism headhouse.

Bowdoin station has a single wedge-shaped island platform (two side platforms that intersect at their east ends) about 20 feet (6.1 m) below the surface. The platform is located inside a balloon loop which allows westbound trains to turn eastbound. West of the loop, about 600 feet (180 m) of two tail tracks (Bowdoin Yard) run west under Cambridge Street. The yard is used as weather-protected train storage during the winter. Six-car trains are able to fit on the westbound platform, but the eastbound section of the platform is only long enough for four cars. Since the Blue Line uses six-car trains, doors cannot be automatically opened; passengers must use pushbuttons on the outside of the train to open doors.

The fare lobby, slightly higher in elevation than the platform, is located in the center of the station. A ramp leads from the fare lobby to the east end of the platform, with stairs connecting the west end of the westbound side of the platform to the lobby. Stairs and an up escalator lead from the lobby to the surface. The station floor is terrazzo, and the walls brown enameled brick. The walls of the track area plus the ceilings are the painted concrete of the tunnel structure. Trim and fittings are primarily stainless steel; columns on the platform are covered with white enamel tile and trimmed with stainless steel.

== History ==
=== Streetcar station ===
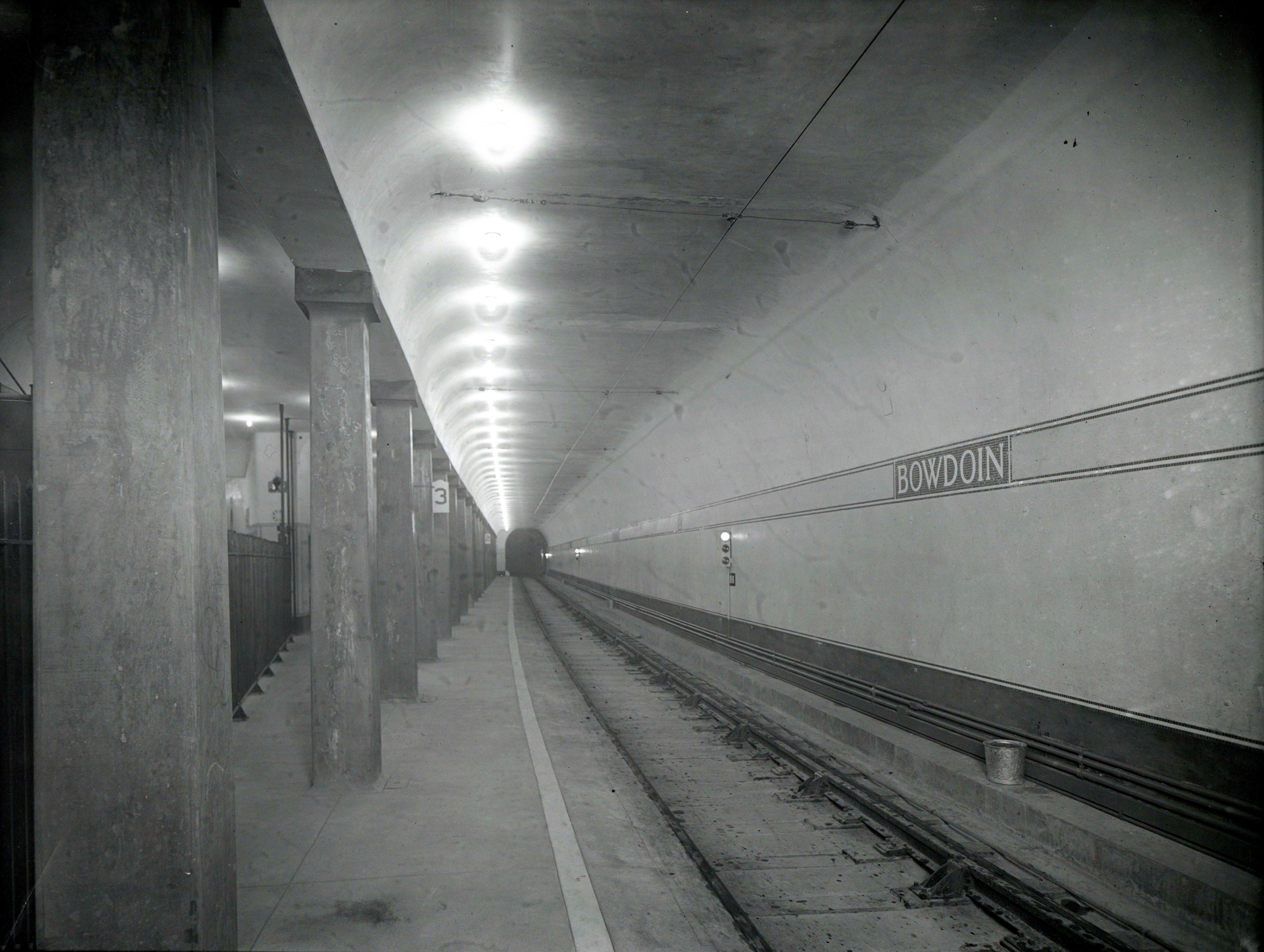
Bowdoin station in January 1916, shortly before opening

The East Boston Tunnel was opened to Boston Elevated Railway (BERy) streetcar service as far as Court Street on December 30, 1904. Court Street proved to be a problematic terminus; its stub-end single-track design limited frequent service and resulted in several fatal crashes. The Boston Transit Commission (BTC) began construction of a 0.5-mile (0.8 km) extension of the East Boston Tunnel on November 29, 1912. The extension ran from Scollay Square (where a new platform was constructed to replace Court Street station) to a new station and loop at Bowdoin Square. Tracks continued west under Cambridge Street to an incline at Joy Street, where streetcars could continue on surface tracks to Charles Street and the Longfellow Bridge to Cambridge.

Bowdoin was built with a wedge-shaped island platform inside a balloon loop, which eliminated the awkward end-changing required at Court Street and allowed use of unpowered trailer cars in the tunnel to increase capacity. The station had two staircase entrances at the west end of Bowdoin Square, adjacent to the Parkman building. The finish of Bowdoin and Scollay Under stations was similar to Washington station (opened 1915) and the Boylston Street subway stations (1914): granolithic platforms, wainscotting of white polished terrazzo, and white plaster upper walls and ceiling. Bands of ceramic tile trimmed the wainscotting; at Bowdoin, the tile was dark blue. The stairwells were walled with polished Quincy granite and roofed with smoothed concrete.

Construction of the station began on March 2, 1914; 247 men were employed for the work. Several buildings had to be underpinned to allow the loop to be built underneath them. Construction of the station was completed on December 4, 1914, with finish work following. On March 13, 1916, service was extended to the new Scollay Under, with streetcars looping empty around the Bowdoin loop. Bowdoin station opened on March 18. All streetcar lines from East Boston looped at Bowdoin except for a Central Square, Cambridge–Orient Heights line, while several Cambridge streetcar lines terminated at Scollay Under.

=== Modifications ===
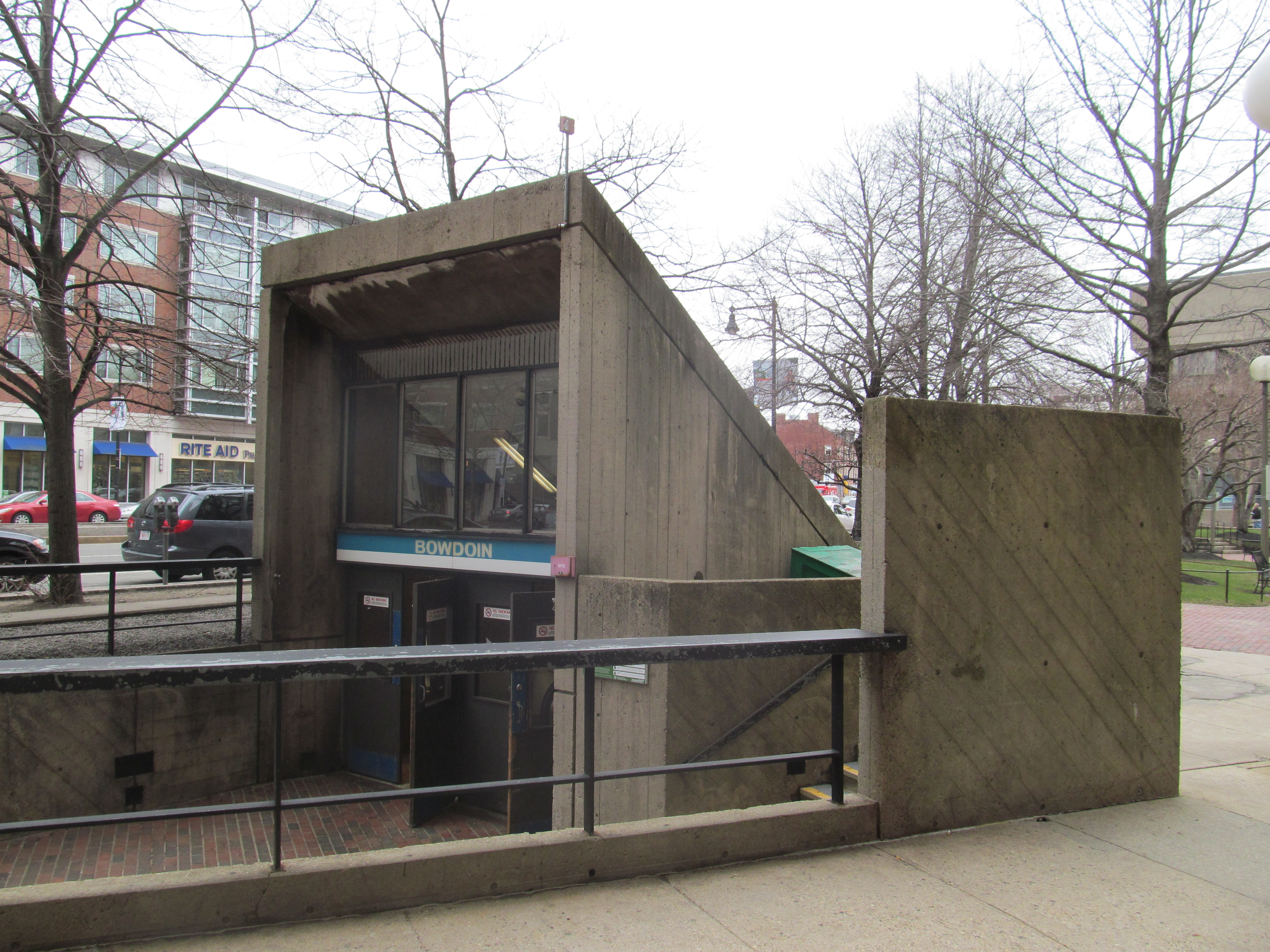
The 1968-built headhouse in April 2017

Though originally planned to use high-floor rapid transit trains, the East Boston Tunnel opened with streetcars serving low-platform stations. Large bi-loading streetcars (with high floors but capable of loading from low platforms), which incorporated many attributes from metro cars used on the Main Line El, began use in 1905. However, neither these nor the large center-entrance cars introduced in 1917 (which were designed for multiple unit operation) could fully handle the crowds.

In 1921, the Boston Transit Department (BTD) – the successor to the BTC – began work at Maverick Square to convert the East Boston Tunnel to high-floor metro trains. The next year, the BTD board approved the construction of high-level platforms at Atlantic Avenue, Devonshire, Scollay Under, and Bowdoin. Construction of concrete high-level platforms 40 inches (1.0 m) above the rails at Bowdoin began in December 1923 or January 1924. A section of low-level platform was left to serve streetcars during construction. Temporary wooden platform sections were put in place to allow service to begin on April 21, with the permanent concrete sections completed by July 12. The Bowdoin platform was also extended 28 feet (8.5 m) east from August 27 to December 12.

Rather than modify the tunnel, the BERy elected to build smaller-than-usual rapid transit cars which could operate in a tunnel designed for streetcars—particularly around the tight loop at Bowdoin. Blue Line cars are thus 48.5 feet (14.8 m) long, substantially shorter than the 65-foot (20 m) Orange Line cars and the 69.5-foot (21.2 m) Red Line cars. Because the line did not have a dedicated heavy maintenance facility, major repair work was performed at Eliot Shops – the main maintenance facility for the Cambridge–Dorchester line. Trains used the former streetcar portal west of Bowdoin and ran on surface streetcar tracks on the Longfellow Bridge, which connected to the Cambridge–Dorchester line tracks near Kendall Square. When the first phase of the Revere Extension opened to Orient Heights with a new maintenance facility in 1952, the connection was no longer necessary and the portal was filled.

The newly formed Massachusetts Bay Transportation Authority (MBTA) assigned colors to the four MBTA subway lines in 1965, with the East Boston Tunnel and Revere Extension becoming the Blue Line. The station was modernized in 1967–1968 as part of a $9 million systemwide station improvement program. The original entrances at the west end of the station were replaced with a glassy entrance under a tilted concrete slab, set into a shallow depression to reduce the costs of installing the escalator. The new headhouse, near the middle of the station, was designed by Josep Lluís Sert as part of a project for a never-built Catholic chapel nearby. Illustrations showing the history of Bowdoin Square were added to the station signs. Bowdoin was closed during part of the renovations and reopened on March 7, 1968. The station was surveyed in 1984 and 1987 for potential inclusion on the National Register of Historic Places; it was concluded that the 1924 and 1968 reconstructions had left little of the original station, and that it was of minor significance within the system.

=== Closures and reopening ===
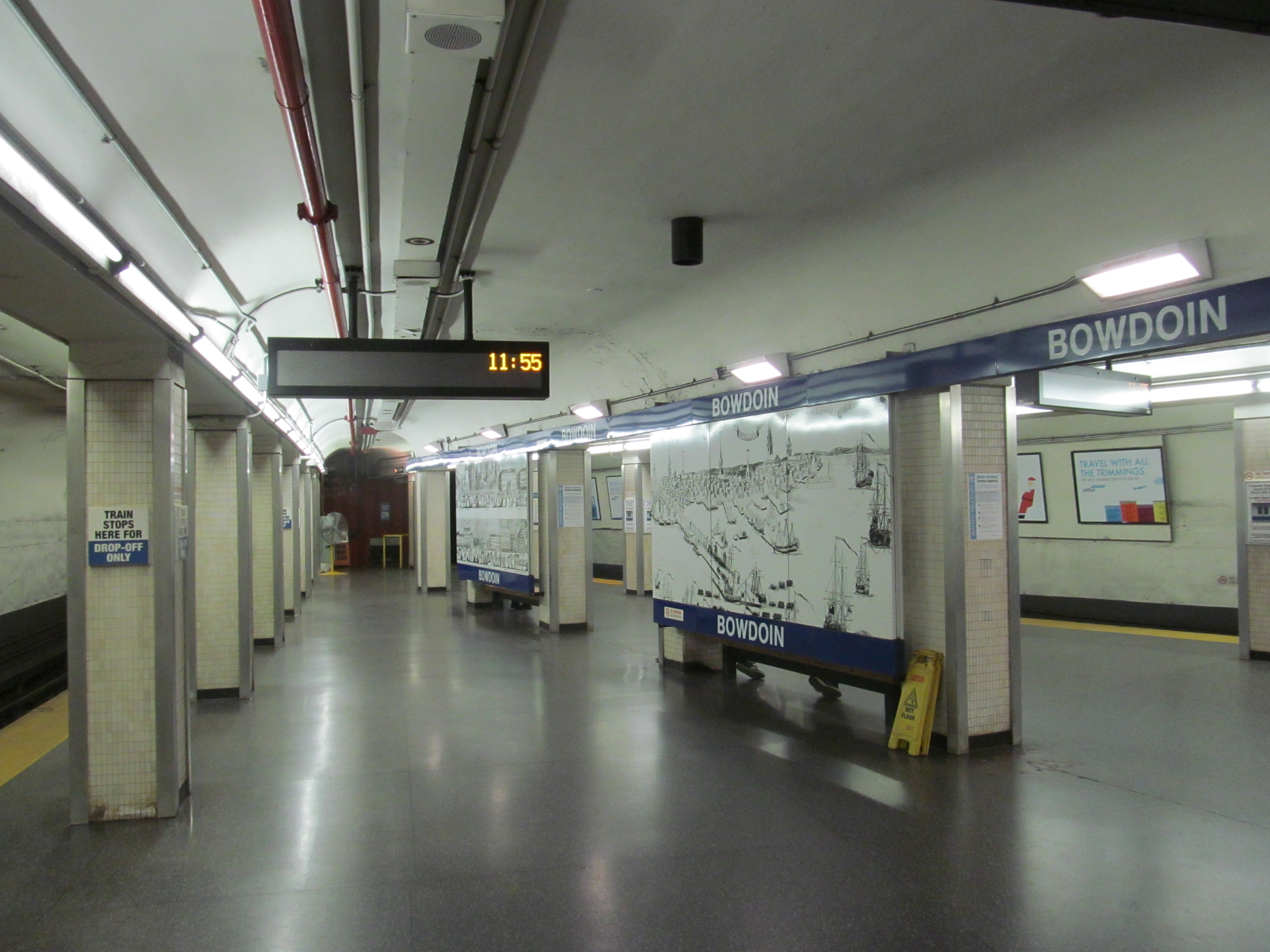
The east end of the platform in 2015

In the early 1980s, the MBTA suffered from a serious budget crisis, which resulted in service cuts. MBTA Commuter Rail service to Providence and Concord and on the Woburn Branch was cut entirely, five underused commuter rail stations were closed, Boylston and Essex were closed for short periods, and the outer ends of the Orange and Blue lines were bustituted on Sundays. Bowdoin, with low ridership and in close proximity to Government Center, was closed on January 3, 1981 due to budget cuts. It reopened on January 11, 1982, but only on weekdays until 6:30 pm – intended to serve workers in nearby office and government buildings. Bowdoin was briefly closed again from March 3 to April 20, 1982, and reopened again with limited hours, with Government Center serving as the terminus on nights and weekends (though trains continued to loop at Bowdoin). After the early 1980s, it was the only MBTA subway station with limited hours.

The station was closed from July 29 to September 8, 1992, during track work on the loop. As the MBTA planned the Blue Line Modernization Project in the early 1990s, the agency planned to close Bowdoin in order to eliminate the tight loop. The closure would take place after the renovation of Government Center, which would re-add a long-closed entrance at the west end of the Blue Line platform. In 2008, the MBTA began running six-car trains on the Blue Line. Because the eastbound side of the Bowdoin platform can only fit four cars, the MBTA had originally planned to close the station when six-car trains entered service; a planned renovation of Government Center station was to add a second headhouse close to Bowdoin Square. However, the station was kept open, with only four cars on each eastbound train berthed at the platform.

Until at least 2011, the MBTA still planned to close the station after Government Center was renovated. However, by 2013, the MBTA decided not to construct the planned west entrance at Government Center, and to instead build only a less-expensive emergency exit. On December 28, 2013, the MBTA resumed night and weekend service to Bowdoin station. The change was intended to provide alternative transportation during the three-month closure of the Callahan Tunnel and subsequent two-year closure of Government Center station. This was the first time since 1981 that the station was open during all operating hours. In February 2016, the MBTA announced that Bowdoin would remain open at all times even after Government Center reopened on March 21. Daily ridership at the station increased from 1,526 in 2013 to 2,127 in FY 2019.

The reconstructions of Government Center in 2014–16 left Bowdoin as the only non-accessible metro station on the Blue Line; aside from street-level light rail stops, Bowdoin is one of only four non-accessible MBTA subway stations. In 2019, the MBTA indicated that Bowdoin was a "Tier II" accessibility priority pending the results of conceptual design.

=== Red Blue Connector ===
The Red Blue Connector is a proposed extension of the Blue Line under Cambridge Street to Charles/MGH station, about 0.4 miles (0.6 km) west of Bowdoin, where a transfer to the Red Line would be available. The project was first proposed in 1924, and returned to consideration in the 1978 update to the Program for Mass Transportation, although extensions from Bowdoin or Government Center to Park Street were proposed in 1926 and 1978. In 1991, the state agreed to build a set of transit projects as part of an agreement with the Conservation Law Foundation (CLF), which had threatened a lawsuit over auto emissions from the Central Artery/Tunnel Project (Big Dig). Among the projects was the Red Blue Connector, to be completed by 2011. This commitment was changed to design only in 2007–08 and lifted entirely in 2015.

Original plans for the connector in 1986 called for a cut-and-cover extension west from Bowdoin Yard, with Bowdoin station retained without significant modifications. The 2010 Draft Environmental Impact Report instead called for a pair of deeper tunnels bored by a tunnel boring machine (TBM), starting east of Bowdoin station and passing underneath the existing platform. Alternatives with a replacement Bowdoin station west of Bowdoin Street, and without a replacement station, were considered; the latter was recommended due to lower cost and reduced travel time. A 2018 update which analyzed multiple tunneling methods only considered an extension without a replacement Bowdoin station, as did a 2020 conceptual design. A 2021 conceptual design raised the possibility of retaining the loop as a storage track.
