= Mary Beams =

American artist and animator

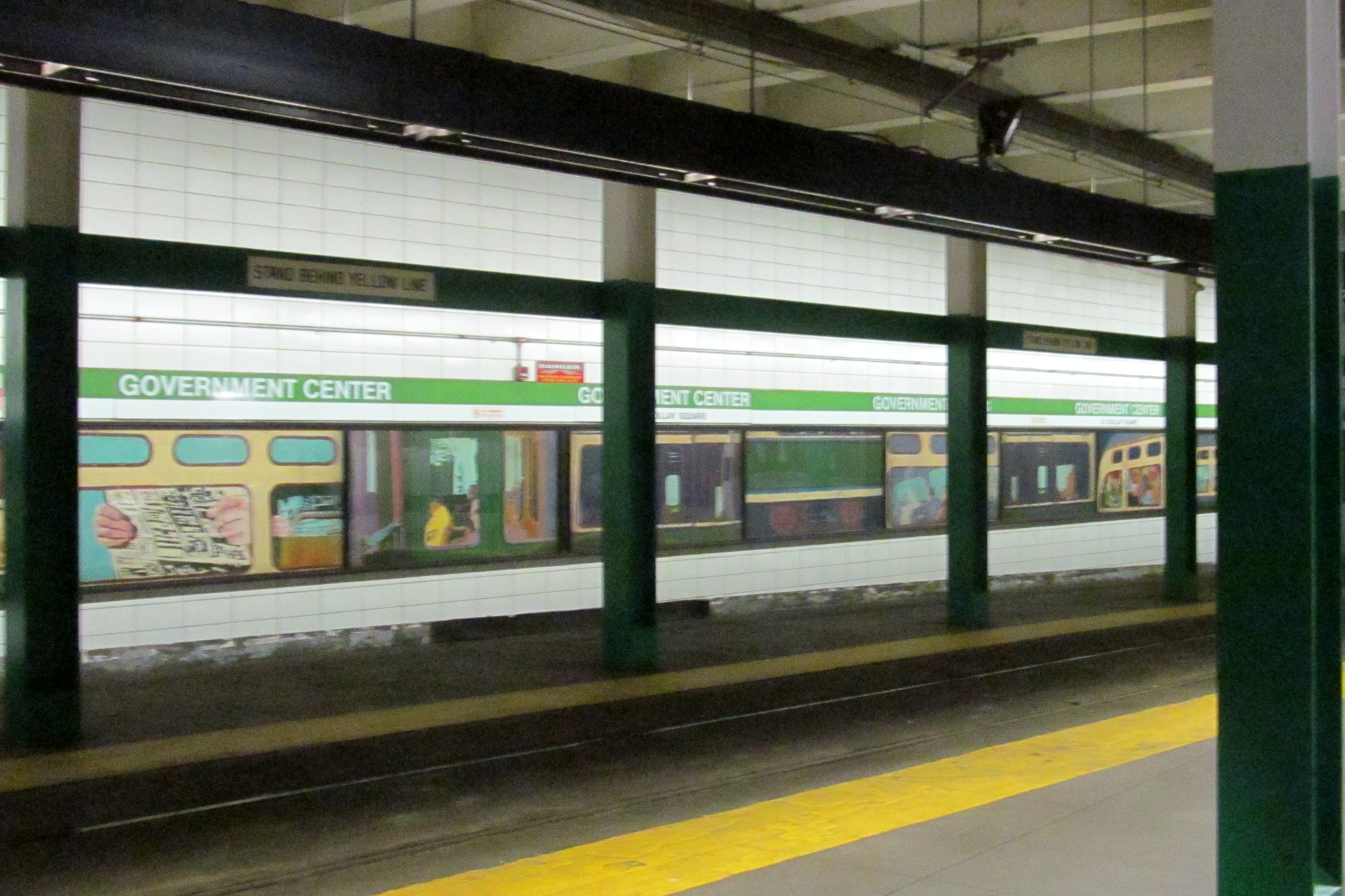
The murals in 2013

Mary Beams (born March 30, 1945) is an American artist and animator, known for her experimentation with animation in the 1970s, which produced "pioneering feminist" work that is considered a "type of personal filmmaking all their own."

== Early life ==
Beams was born in Chicago, March 30, 1945. After studying painting and graphics at Miami University, Beams moved to the Boston area, where she took her M.A. in filmmaking at Boston University, then went on to study animation at Harvard. Beams worked as a teaching assistant at Harvard's Carpenter Center for the Visual Arts.

== Career in art ==
=== Animation ===
Mary Beams's work in animation includes experiments in motion via minimalist Super 8 and 16mm rotoscoping, and hybrids of hand-rubbed animation and live action. Through film, Beams conveys "a worldview centered around gentleness and delight in the beauty of being alive." Her themes include "memory, erotic fantasy and feminism."

=== Murals ===
Beams became known as the creator of the Boston MBTA Green Line murals. She had created 19 murals for the city's Government Center station in 1978. The panels, approximately 130 linear feet in length, depicted the exterior of a subway train, with the train riders visible through the train's windows. Intended as a temporary installation, the murals remained in place for three decades. Describing the imagery, Beams said "I'd put anything I felt like putting, so in one window you might see giant hands holding giant newspapers, and then in the next you might see a group of people playing with a dog."

When they were removed in 2015 during an overhaul of the station, the Massachusetts Bay Transportation Authority made efforts to contact her and return the paintings. She rejected their offer, and suggested that the panels be put up for public auction, to generate more art-devoted funds for the MBTA. The plywood panels, painted with Benjamin Moore paints, were auctioned separately, raising $65,000 for a replacement artwork in enameled porcelain.

=== Later years ===
By the 1990s Beams had "largely abandoned the art world and destroyed her archive without regret." "It was incredibly freeing," Beams is quoted as saying.

Beams's freedom did not last long. The time-specific originality of Beams' animated work, constructed by hand in the pre-computer age of animation, and often on 4 × 6" index cards, has become more fully appreciated with the passage of time. Her films now appear in regular screenings at major art institutions in North America and Europe, including the Tate Modern and MoMA, which holds a large store of Beams' work in its permanent collection.

Currently resident in Grand Marais, Minnesota, Beams has become known in recent years as a maker of pies, and is part-owner of the Pie Place Café.

== Filmography ==
Whale Songs (1979)

School in the Sky (c. 1979)

Paul Revere Is Here (1976)

Rain Seeds (1976)

Going Home Sketchbook (1975)

Seed Reel No. 1 (1975)

Piano Rub (1975)

Solo Film (1975)

The Tub (1972)

Quilt Film (n.d.)

== Selected screenings ==
- MoMA Presents: Mary Beams and Emily Hubley (Feb 4–17, 2021) MoMA, New York, NY
- Animatedly Yours (March 2018) Walker Art Center Minneapolis, MN
- The Eyeworks Festival of Experimental Animation at REDCAT (Fall, 2018)
- Independent Frames: American Experimental Animation in the 1970s + 1980s (February, 2017) Tate Modern, London, UK
