= Charles/MGH station =

Rapid transit station in Boston, Massachusetts, US

Charles/MGH
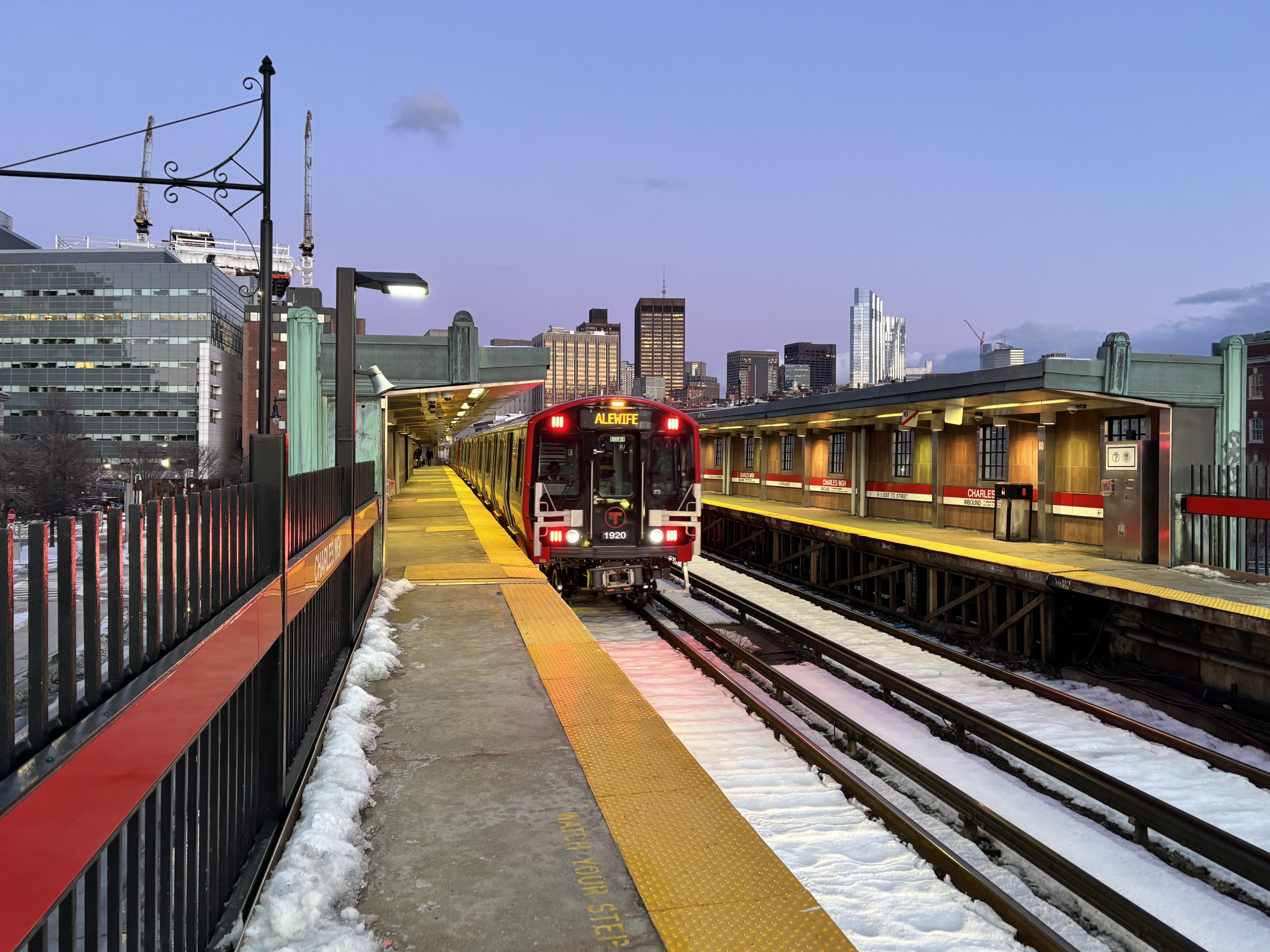
- A northbound train entering Charles/MGH station in 2025

General information
- Location: 170 Charles Street; Boston, Massachusetts
- Coordinates: 42.3612°N 71.0710°W
- Platforms: 2 side platforms
- Tracks: 2

Construction
- Structure type: Elevated
- Accessible: Yes

History
- Opened: February 27, 1932
- Rebuilt: June 2003–February 17, 2007

Passengers
- FY2019: 10,515 daily boardings

Services
Preceding station	MBTA	Following station
Kendall/MIT toward Alewife	Red Line	Park Street toward Ashmont or Braintree
Proposed services
Preceding station	MBTA	Following station
Terminus	Blue Line	Government Center toward Wonderland
Track layout
Location

Charles/MGH station is a rapid transit station on the MBTA Red Line, elevated above Charles Circle on the east end of the Longfellow Bridge in the West End neighborhood of Boston, Massachusetts. The station is named for Charles Circle and the adjacent Massachusetts General Hospital (MGH) campus. It has two side platforms, with a glass-walled headhouse structure inside Charles Circle. Charles/MGH station is fully accessible.

The Cambridge subway opened in 1912; planning for an infill station at Charles Street began in 1924. After several false starts, construction of Charles station began in 1931. The Art Deco station, with cast stone headhouse and copper-sheathed platforms, opened on February 27, 1932. A pedestrian tunnel that provided station access was replaced by footbridges in 1961. The station was renamed Charles/MGH in 1973. From 2003 to 2007, the station was renovated for accessibility; a new glass entrance replaced the original structure. The proposed Red Blue Connector would extend the Blue Line to Charles/MGH, with a new underground platform level.

== Station design ==
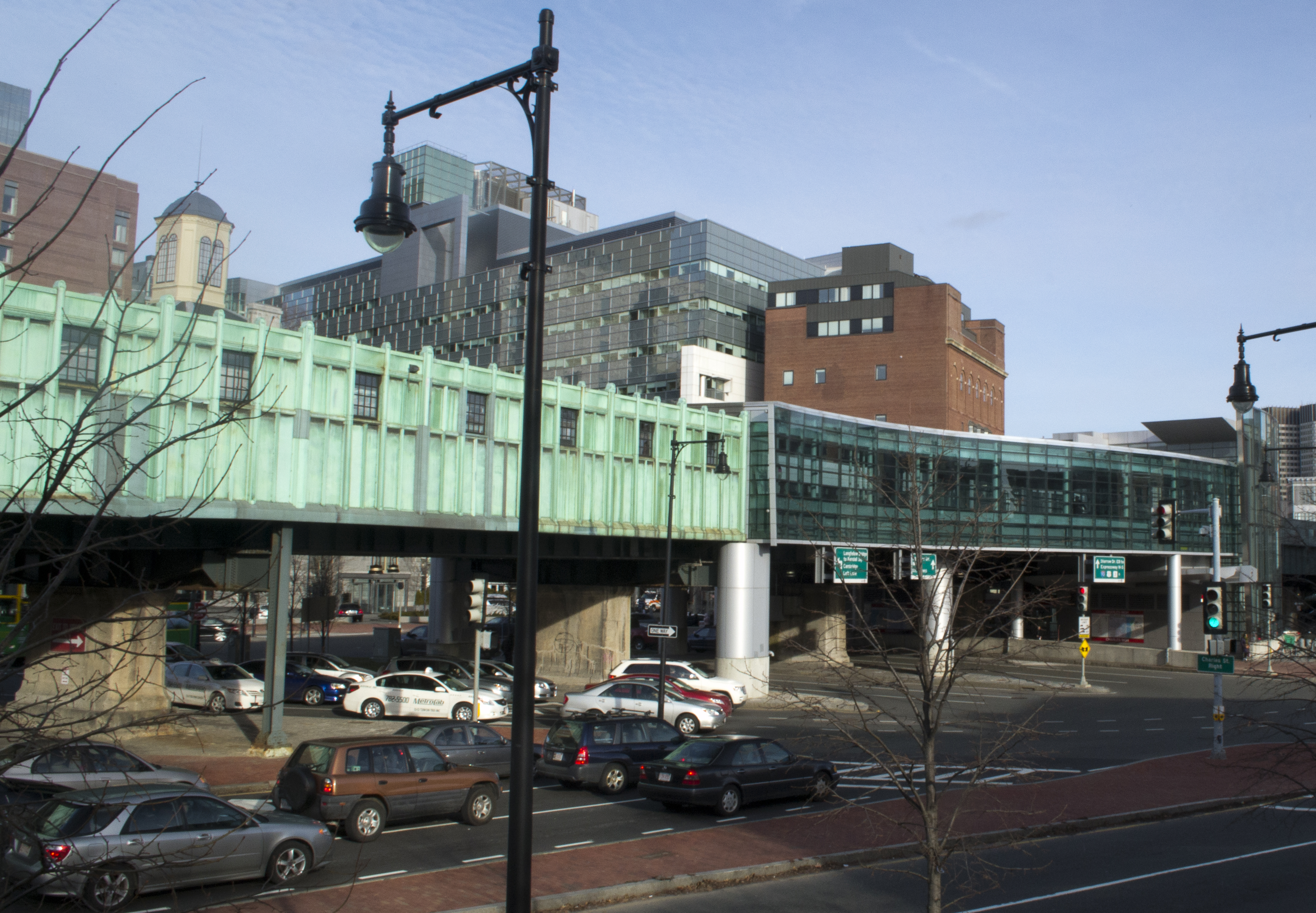
The platforms (left) and headhouse

Charles/MGH station is located at Charles Circle at the west end of the West End and Beacon Hill neighborhoods. The station is on a short elevated segment that connects tracks in the median of the Longfellow Bridge to the west with an incline into the Beacon Hill Tunnel to the east. The two elevated side platforms, 22 feet (6.7 m) above ground level, run west from Charles Circle onto the east end of the Longfellow Bridge.

At their east ends, the platforms widen into passageways that lead to elevators, escalators, and stairs to the surface-level fare lobby in the center of Charles Circle. The station entrance is on the west side of the fare lobby under the tracks, with crosswalks connecting to the sidewalks on both sides of Cambridge Street. The fare lobby and passageways are wrapped in a teardrop-shaped curved glass facade, while most of the platforms have a patinaed copper windscreen.

== History ==
=== Opening ===
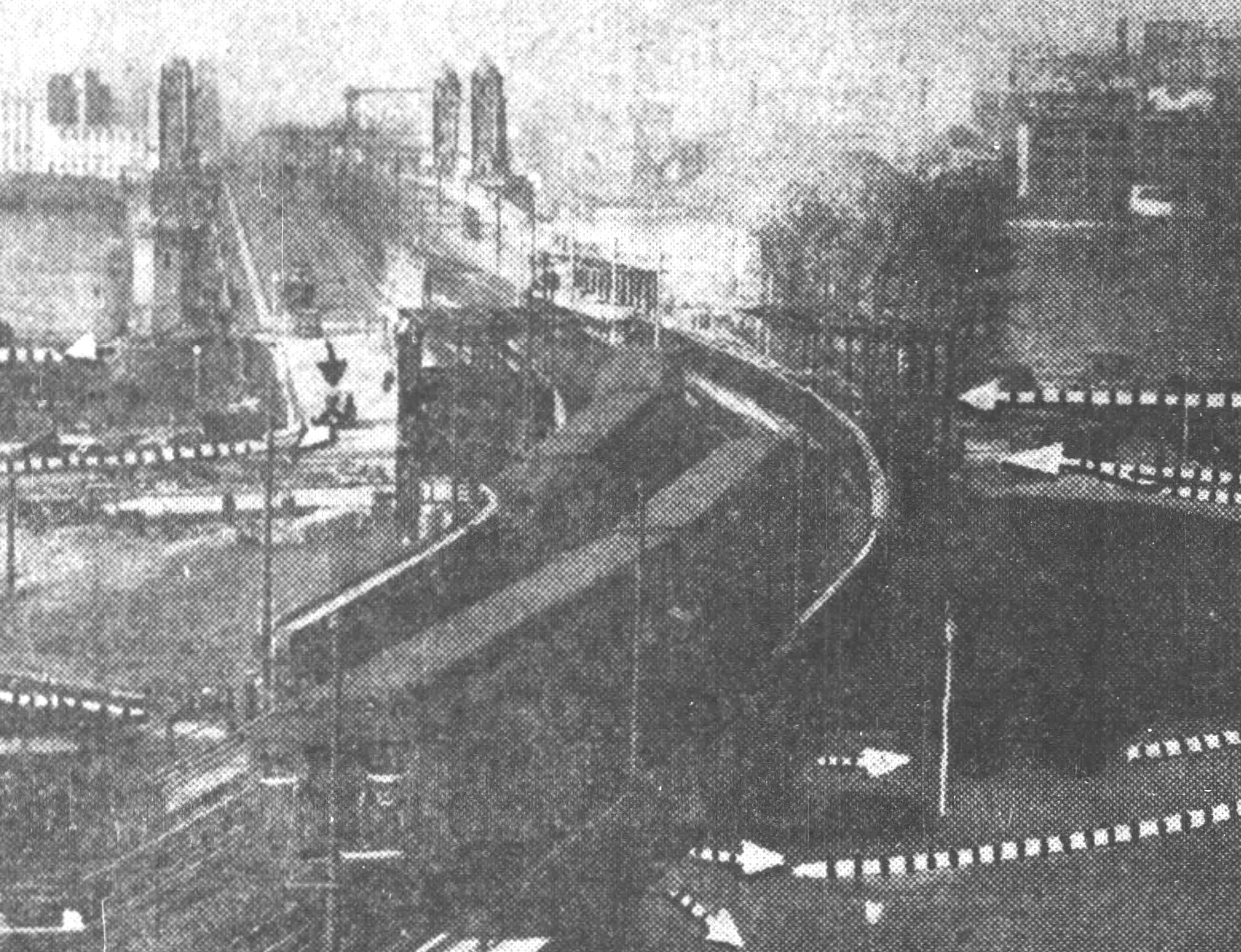
The station under construction in 1931

The Boston Elevated Railway (BERy) opened its Cambridge Subway from Park Street Under to Harvard on March 23, 1912. The line ran in the median of the Longfellow Bridge to cross the Charles River. Like the Lechmere extension opened the same year and the Boylston Street subway opened in 1914, the Cambridge Subway originally had no station serving the area just outside downtown Boston, to speed travel time from farther stations. Although Bowdoin opened on an extension of the East Boston Tunnel in 1916, much of the West End and Beacon Hill neighborhoods were poorly served by the subway system.

Boston mayor James Michael Curley began advocating in 1923 for a station to serve the West End and Massachusetts General Hospital. On June 2, 1924, the Massachusetts General Court passed legislation authorizing the state Department of Public Utilities (DPU) to construct an infill station at Charles Street. Following a 1924 study by the Boston Transit Department (BTD), the DPU delegated the project to the BTD on January 12, 1925. That study also considered an extension of the East Boston Tunnel to Charles Street to provide a transfer between the lines.

The project stalled in 1926 as the $600,000 appropriated by the legislature was only sufficient for four-car platforms, while the BERy insisted on six-car platforms at a cost of $850,000 to accommodate its future plans. Despite pressure from the Massachusetts General Hospital, located adjacent to the proposed station site, the legislature again refused additional funding in 1927. Uncertainty over whether the station would be built delayed plans to construct a traffic circle at the intersection.

No further progress was made until 1930, when the BERy and BTD reached an agreement for a $350,000 station with four-car platforms. The cost reduction was achieved by having the platforms on the straight track west of Charles Street, rather than the curve to the east. Plans for the station were completed in July 1930. Bidding on the station opened in early July 1931, and a construction contract was awarded later that month. Charles Circle was completed in November 1931, by which time the steel structure of the station was in place in the center of the traffic circle. Charles station opened on February 27, 1932. The station was served by Bowdoin Square–Park Square and Charles station–Massachusetts station bus routes, though a Kendall Square–Bowdoin Square route was closed with the station's opening.

Charles station was designed by H. Parker from the office of Richard Clipston Sturgis. The three-story headhouse structure, 42 by 70 feet (13 m × 21 m), was framed with steel and clad in cast stone. The first story had a rough finish, while the double-height second story and the third story (divided into two by the tracks) were smooth. The structure was Art Deco/Art Moderne in style, with decorative pilasters and a chevron panel. The platforms had copper windscreens, also in Art Deco style. A north-south pedestrian underpass crossed the traffic circle, with stairs leading from the underpass to the station entrance. Only the north half of the underpass was originally planned; public pressure resulted in the addition of the south half. A 14-story Art Deco tower over the station, designed by H. F. Kellogg, was proposed but never built.

=== Modifications and the MBTA ===
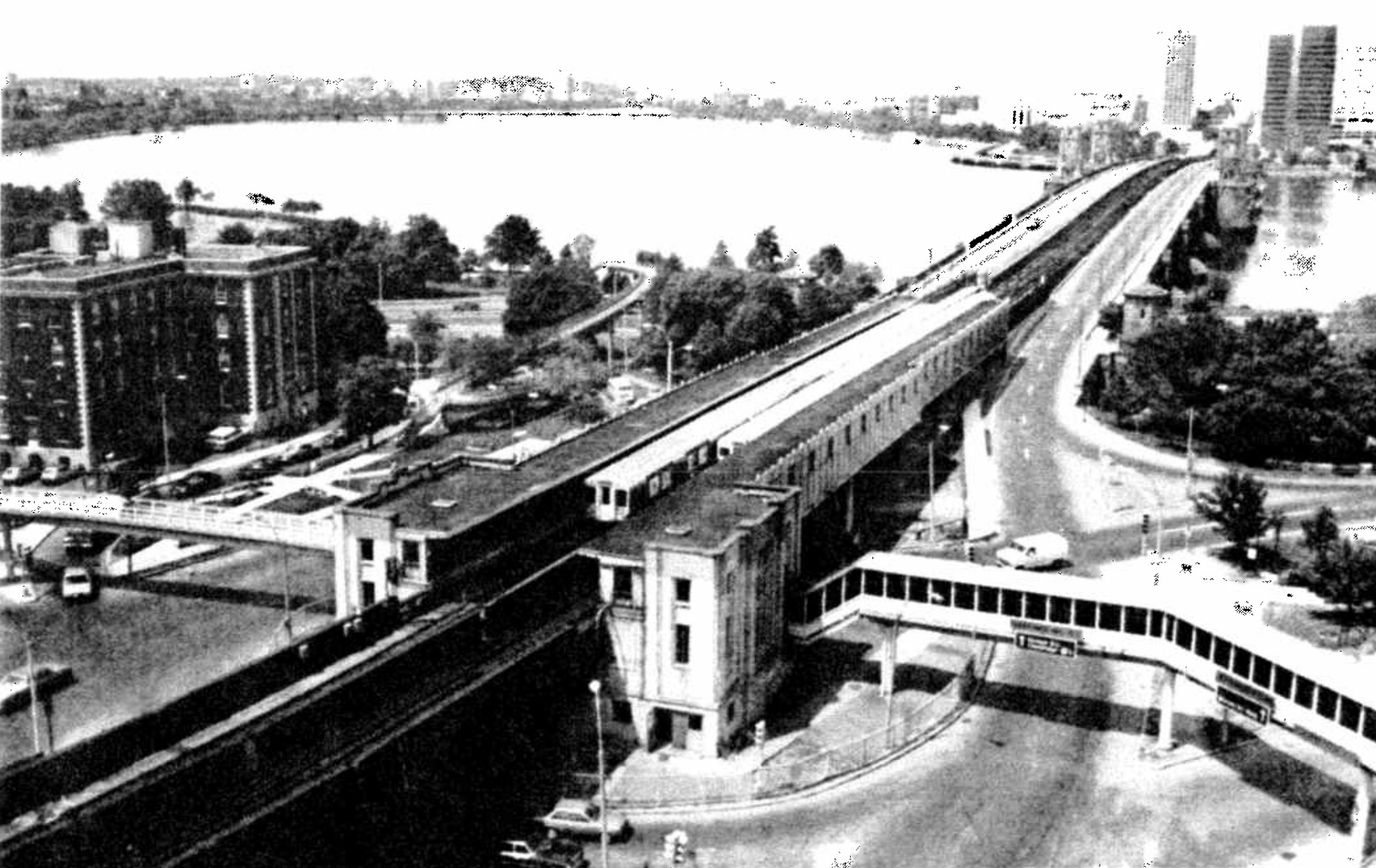
The station in 1986

In 1961, the pedestrian underpass was replaced by a pair of footbridges, with the south footbridge forked to reach both sides of Charles Street. The second story was modified to serve as a fare mezzanine, with a low ceiling under the trackway. Openings were cut in the walls to accommodate the footbridges. Around half of pedestrian traffic on the footbridges was crossing the circle rather than using the station, which caused congestion in the mezzanine area.

On January 13, 1961, the MTA began operating "modified express service" on the line during the morning rush hour, following the introduction of similar service on the Forest Hills–Everett line the month before. Every other train bypassed Charles and three other stations. This was discontinued in September 1961 to reduce wait times at the skipped stations, most of which were outdoors. In 1964, the Massachusetts Bay Transportation Authority (MBTA) replaced the Metropolitan Transit Authority, which had replaced the BERy in 1947. The MBTA designated the line as the Red Line in 1965.

The final bus service at the station, a Back Bay–Downtown circulator route, was discontinued in June 1971. In December 1973, the station was renamed Charles/MGH after the nearby Massachusetts General Hospital (MGH). Three southbound trains collided inside the Beacon Hill Tunnel just south of the station on August 1, 1975, injuring 132 passengers. In 1982, the platforms were extended 120 feet (37 m) west to allow for use of six-car trains, which began operation in 1988. Surveys in 1984 and 1987 found that the station was not eligible for inclusion on the National Register of Historic Places.

=== Reconstruction ===
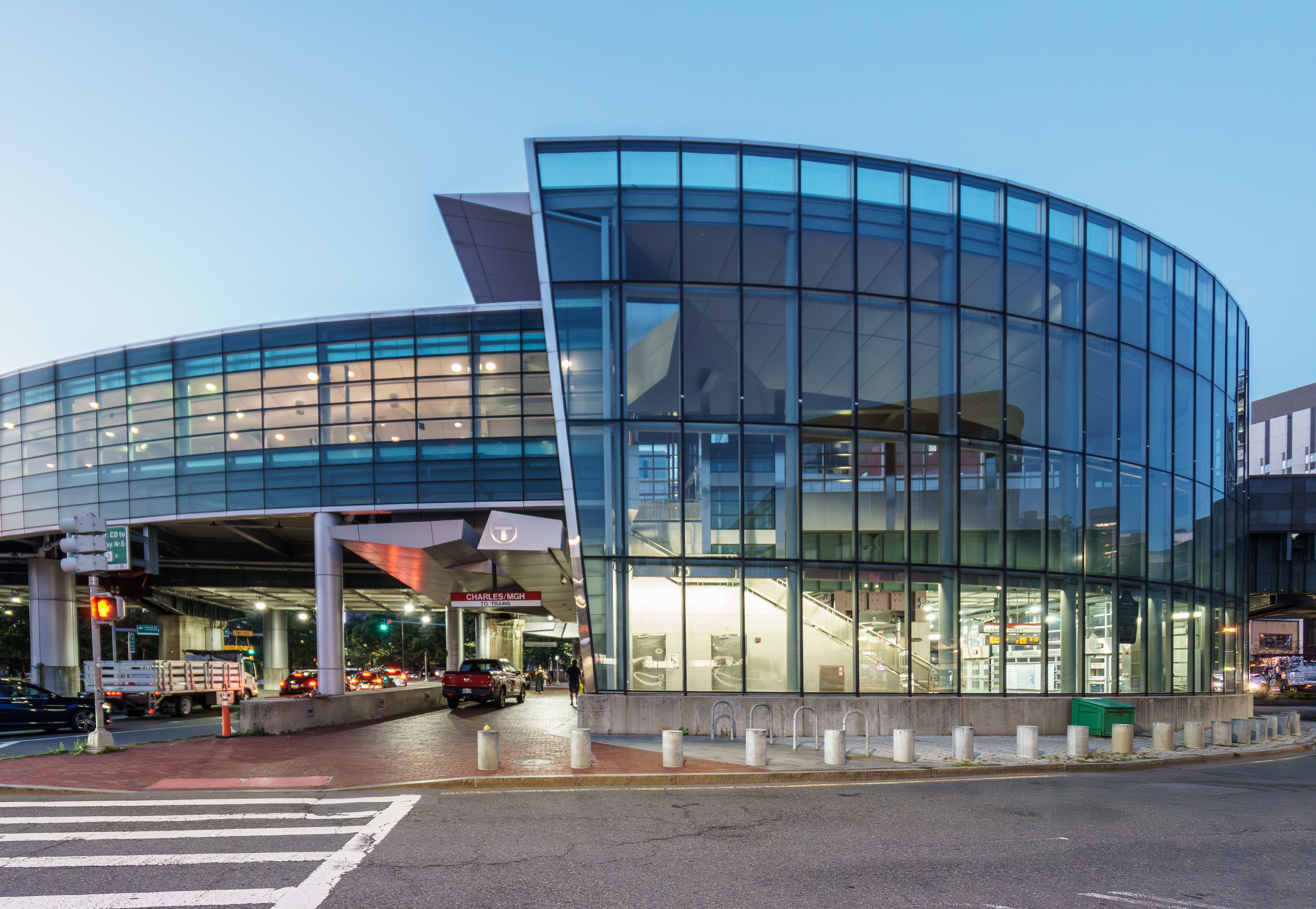
The new headhouse in 2025

The MBTA renovated most Red Line stations for accessibility in the 1980s and 1990s. Planning began for modifications to Charles/MGH in the late 1990s. Although the station was determined to be eligible for inclusion on the National Register, it was in poor condition: the cast stone cladding was spalled and cracked, water infiltration had rusted steel and damaged plaster, and the mezzanine level was overcrowded. The platforms were pitted, columns were rusted, and paint was peeling. Three options were developed in a 2000 design report: rehabilitation of the existing station with added elevators, a new surface-level station entrance slightly to the east inside the traffic circle, and a surface-level entrance at Cedar Street with a footbridge above the tracks and ramps down to the platforms. The second option was recommended.

In June 2003, the MBTA began its $34.4 million reconstruction of the station – part of a $48.6 million project that also realigned Charles Circle. Temporary staircases directly to the platforms were opened in May 2004. The pedestrian bridges were removed, and the original headhouses were demolished in July 2004. The new glass headhouse was built slightly to the east of the former headhouse location. The copper platform enclosures were restored with new interior cladding to preserve some of the historic station architecture.

The new entrance opened on February 17, 2007, making the station fully accessible. Public art created by the community from recycled materials was installed in the fare lobby in June 2007. The renovations made the station no longer eligible for National Register inclusion. The renovation received the "Honor Award" from the Massachusetts Architectural Access Board in 2009.

Design began in October 2019 for rehabilitation of the viaduct spans around the station, as well as the station platforms. The project will also include a new accessible station entrance west of the existing headhouse. Project design was placed on hold in July 2024 at 30% completion pending funding for construction. The MBTA also plans to address excessive vertical gap between train cars and the station platforms.

=== Proposed Blue Line connection ===
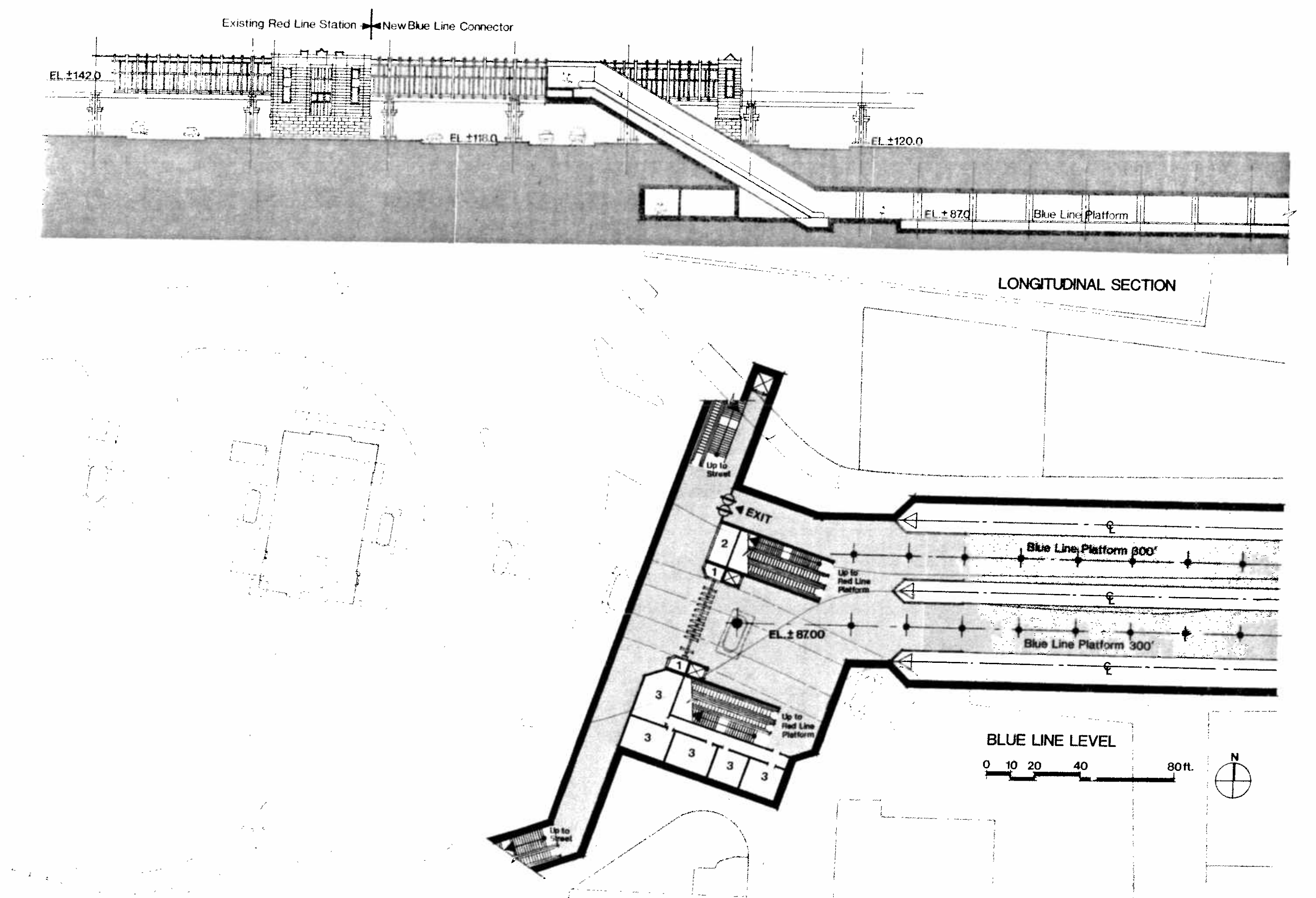
Plan of the two-platform scheme for the Blue Line level from the 1986 study

The Red Blue Connector is a proposed 0.4-mile (0.6 km) extension of the Blue Line from Bowdoin west under Cambridge Street, providing a direct transfer between the Red and Blue lines. The project was first proposed in 1924, and was returned to consideration in the 1978 update to the Program for Mass Transportation. In 1991, the state agreed to build a set of transit projects as part of an agreement with the Conservation Law Foundation (CLF), which had threatened a lawsuit over auto emissions from the Central Artery/Tunnel Project (Big Dig). Among the projects was the Red Blue Connector, to be completed by 2011. This commitment was changed to design only in 2007–08 and lifted entirely in 2015.

Original plans for the connector in 1986 called for a cut-and-cover tunnel extension west from Bowdoin, with an underground stub-end terminal connected to the existing Charles/MGH station. Three configurations for the Blue Line level at Charles/MGH were considered: a three-track terminal with two island platforms, a two-track terminal with one island platform and pocket tracks to the east, and a three-track terminal with one island platform (one track not used for passenger service) and pocket tracks to the east. The 2010 Draft Environmental Impact Report instead called for a pair of deeper tunnels bored by a tunnel boring machine (TBM); the Charles/MGH terminal would have a single island platform with tail tracks extended to the west.

A 2018 update which analyzed multiple tunneling methods maintained this station configuration. In April 2019, the MBTA indicated plans to spend $15 million to design the connector in a five-year spending plan. In April 2021, MGH released the Draft Project Impact Report for their expansion plans, which include space reserved for a new headhouse on the north side of Cambridge Street near North Anderson Street. MBTA conceptual designs created in 2020 and released in 2021 also maintained the station configuration, with the new MGH entrance incorporated. Potential designs not chosen included one with a below-grade fare mezzanine for both lines, and one with the Blue Line platform located on the north side of Charles Circle. Construction was planned to last from 2025 to 2030.
