= Government Center station (MBTA) =

Subway station in Boston, Massachusetts, US

Government Center
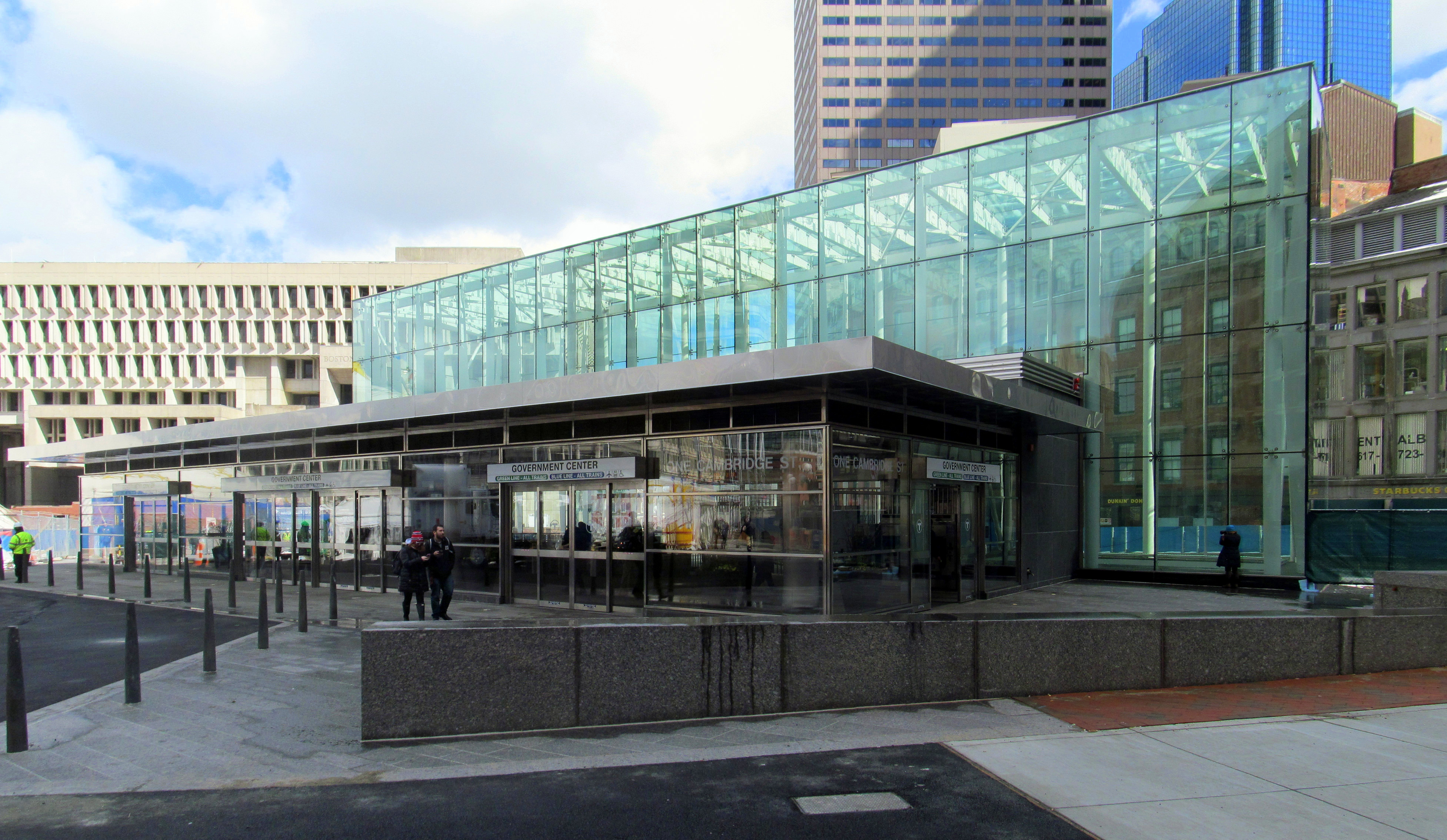
- Government Center station headhouse in March 2016

General information
- Location: 1 Cambridge Street; Boston, Massachusetts
- Coordinates: 42.3597°N 71.0593°W
- Lines: East Boston Tunnel (Blue Line); Tremont Street subway (Green Line)
- Platforms: 1 island platform (Blue Line); 1 triangular island platform (Green Line); 1 disused side platform (Green Line)
- Tracks: Blue Line: 2 Green Line: 2 plus non-revenue loop track
- Connections: MBTA bus: 354

Construction
- Structure type: Underground
- Accessible: Yes

History
- Opened: September 3, 1898 (Green Line); December 30, 1904 (Court Street station); March 18, 1916 (Blue Line)
- Closed: November 15, 1914 (Court Street station)
- Rebuilt: March 22, 2014–March 21, 2016
- Former names: Scollay Square (1898–1963)

Passengers
- FY2019: 7,677 daily boardings

Services
Preceding station	MBTA	Following station
Park Street toward Boston College	Green Line B branch	Terminus
Park Street toward Cleveland Circle	Green Line C branch	Terminus
Park Street toward Riverside	Green Line D branch	Haymarket toward Union Square
Park Street toward Heath Street	Green Line E branch	Haymarket toward Medford/Tufts
Bowdoin Terminus	Blue Line	State toward Wonderland
Former services
Preceding station	Boston Elevated Railway	Following station
Park Street toward Dudley	Main Line Elevated 1901–1908	Haymarket One-way operation
Park Street toward Dudley	Main Line Elevated 1901–1908	Adams Square toward Sullivan Square
Proposed services
Preceding station	MBTA	Following station
Charles/MGH Terminus	Blue Line	State toward Wonderland
Track layout
Location

Government Center station is an MBTA subway station in Boston, Massachusetts. It is located at the intersection of Tremont, Court and Cambridge Streets in the Government Center area. It is a transfer point between the light rail Green Line and the rapid transit Blue Line. With the Green Line platform having opened in 1898, the station is the third-oldest operating subway station (and the second-oldest of the quartet of "hub stations") in the MBTA system; only Park Street and Boylston are older. The station previously served Scollay Square, which was demolished for the creation of Boston City Hall Plaza.

The station was closed on March 22, 2014, for a major renovation, which included retrofitting the station for accessibility and building a new glass headhouse on City Hall Plaza. The newly fully accessible station was reopened on March 21, 2016.

== History ==
=== Scollay Square ===
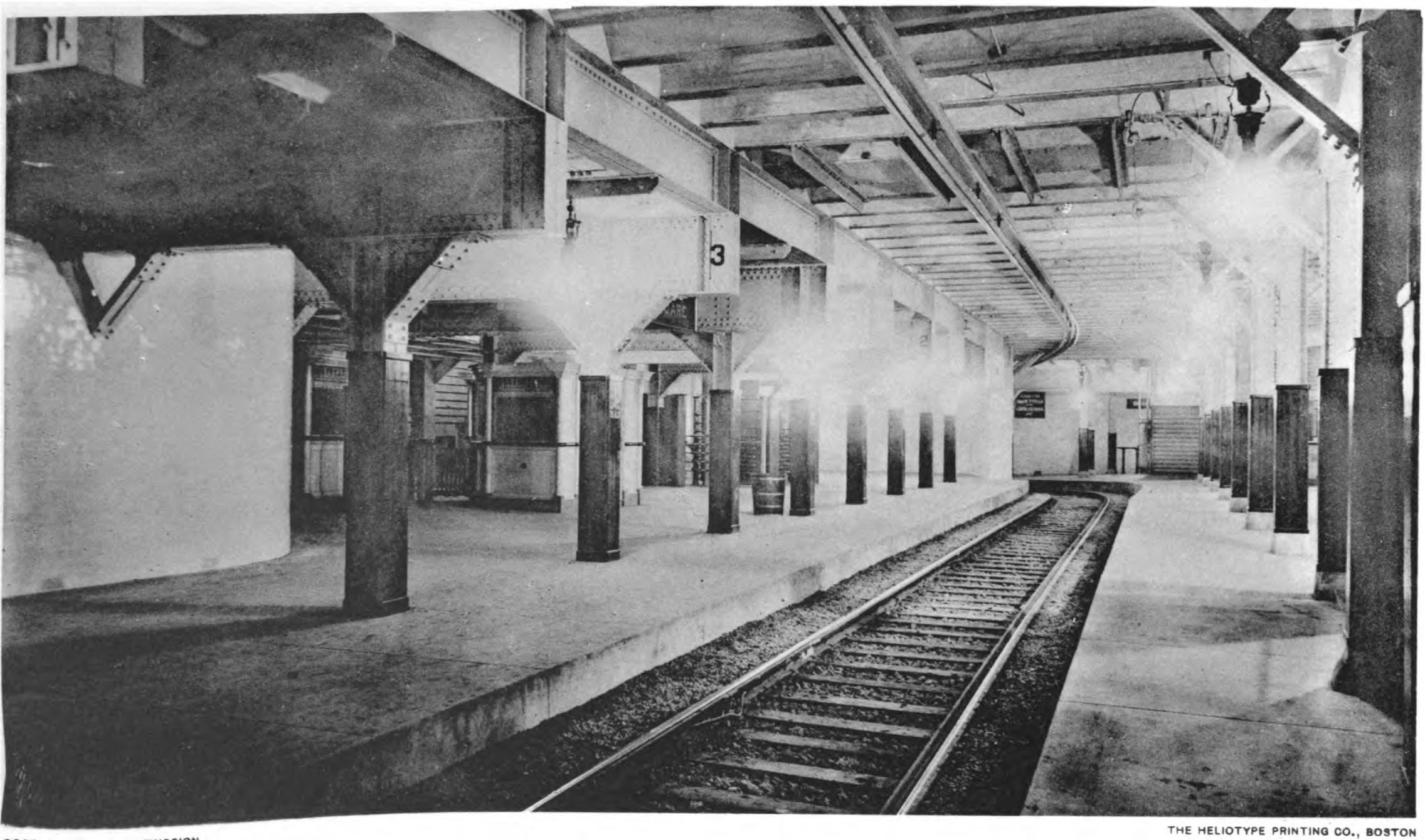
Brattle Loop shortly after the station's opening, with the side platform at left and the main platform at right

As the first horsecar lines were built in the late 1850s, the Scollay Building in Scollay Square became the transfer point between the various lines. The Metropolitan Railroad, the largest of the horsecar systems, used the Tremont House hotel a block to the south of Scollay Square as a terminus for many routes.

The northern section of the Tremont Street Subway opened on September 3, 1898, with a station at Scollay Square. The station had an unusual platform design. The three-sided main platform served northbound and southbound through tracks plus the Brattle Loop track, one of two turnback points (along with Adams Square) for streetcars entering the subway from the north; a side platform also served the loop Boston Elevated Railway (BERy) streetcars from Everett, Medford, and Malden (which formerly ran to Scollay Square on the surface) used Brattle Loop, as did cars from Lynn and Boston Railroad and its successors. The last of those, the Eastern Massachusetts Street Railway, used the loop until 1935.

Scollay Square and Adams Square had similar baroque headhouses with four-sided clock towers. Unlike Adams Square, the Scollay Square headhouse had its entrance at one end of the structure. A small exit structure was located to the north, while the Brattle Loop used a separate entrance built into a building at Court Street and Brattle Street. The headhouses of the Tremont were sharply criticized as "pretentiously monumental", with the Scollay Square headhouse compared to "an enlarged soda fountain". Later stations on the East Boston Tunnel and Washington Street Tunnel incorporated this criticism into their more modest headhouses.

On June 10, 1901, Main Line Elevated trains began using the through tracks through the Tremont Street Subway, while streetcars continued using the Brattle Loop. The main platform was divided into separate sections for northbound and southbound elevated trains, each with separate staircases and ticket takers, with sliding platform sections to meet the high-level doors on the El cars. Passages under the Brattle Loop were built from each side to the Brattle Loop platform, which had its own staircases and ticket takers for streetcars. On July 9, 1904, streetcar passengers began paying fares to the streetcar conductors and the streetcar ticket office was repurposed for southbound El passengers.

=== Court Street ===
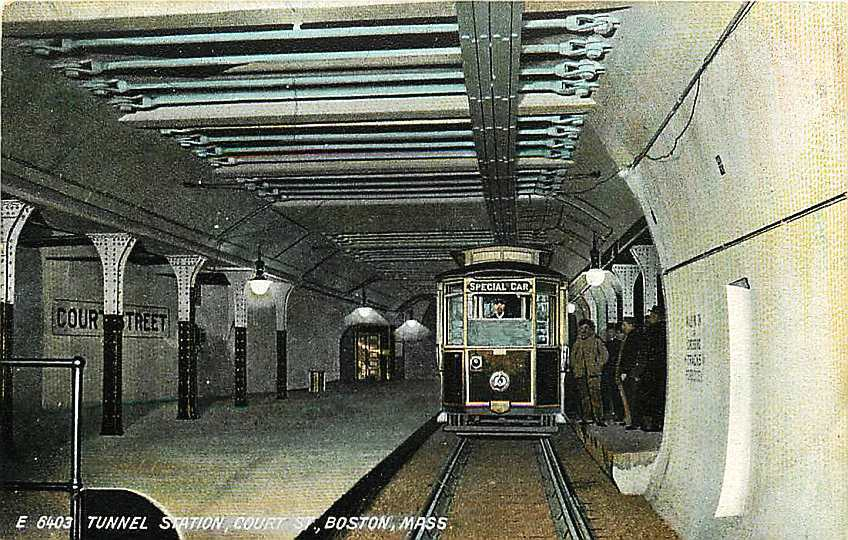
Court Street station on an early postcard

On December 30, 1904, the East Boston Tunnel opened for streetcars from Maverick Square in East Boston to a one-track stub-end terminal at Court Street next to Scollay Square. A passageway was built connecting the two stations. A bronze statue of John Winthrop was relocated from Scollay Square to the Back Bay in 1903 to make room for the exit stairs from the station. Erected in 1880, the statue had already been moved in 1898 to make room for the first headhouse.

The stub-end track at Court Street was normally restricted to one streetcar at a time; however, two were commonly allowed during peak periods. On October 6, 1906, a conductor was crushed to death between two streetcars while preparing his trolley pole for the return trip - the second such accident at the station. In addition to these incidents, the stub-end terminal was operationally inefficient, which prompted the need for a replacement.

=== Return to streetcar use ===
On November 30, 1908, Elevated trains moved into the parallel Washington Street Tunnel and the Tremont Street Subway through tracks returned to streetcar operations. The separated platform areas were kept; the through tracks offered a free transfer to East Boston Tunnel streetcars (plus a small toll for use of the tunnel, separate from normal BERy fares), while the Brattle Loop platform was kept separate for "foreign" (non-BERy) cars on a separate fare system.

=== Scollay Under ===
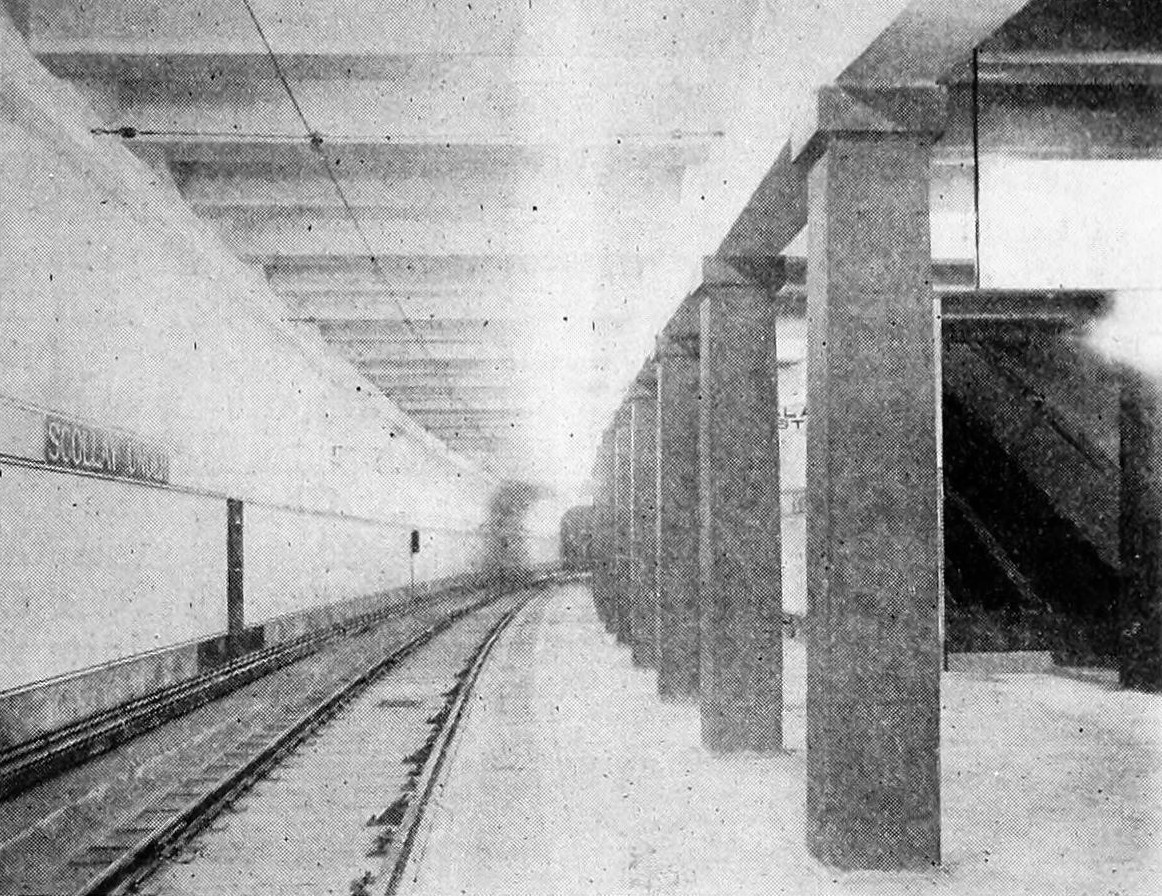
The Scollay Under platform in January 1916, shortly before service began

In November 1912, the Boston Transit Commission began an extension of the East Boston Tunnel west to Bowdoin. Court Street station was abandoned on November 15, 1914; a passageway was opened to connect Scollay Square station with Devonshire, which temporarily served as the terminal. The floor of the station was removed and the tunnel angled down through the former station to allow for the extended tunnel to proceed under the existing Scollay Square station. The upper part of the former station was later converted to storage space.

Scollay Under opened on March 13, 1916, with streetcars looping empty around the Bowdoin loop. It had an island platform with staircases to the existing Scollay station. The 1898-built platform was extended during the project to accommodate expected loads of transferring passengers. Bowdoin station opened on March 18. An Orient Heights–Central Square, Cambridge through service was started, while several Cambridge streetcar lines entered the new tunnel and terminated on a pocket track at Scollay Under.

The northbound (Cornhill Street) entrance was closed on November 24, 1917, forcing all passengers to use the southbound Tremont Row entrance. In 1927, the original headhouse was replaced with a simple staircase to improve sightlines for auto drivers. On April 18, 1924, the East Boston Tunnel including Scollay Under was converted from low-platform streetcars to high-platform third-rail-powered rapid transit. A portion of the low streetcar platform remained east of the new high platform.

The station was further renovated in 1928 with new lights, and improved fare collection equipment. Eastern Massachusetts Street Railway service to Brattle Loop ended on January 13, 1935, though some BERy streetcars continued to use it. The Metropolitan Transit Authority (MTA) replaced the BERy in 1947 and continued to reduce streetcar services. The last Brattle Loop service was discontinued in 1952. The northbound platform was extended over the loop in 1954 to allow two 3-car trains of PCC streetcars to board simultaneously.

=== Government Center ===
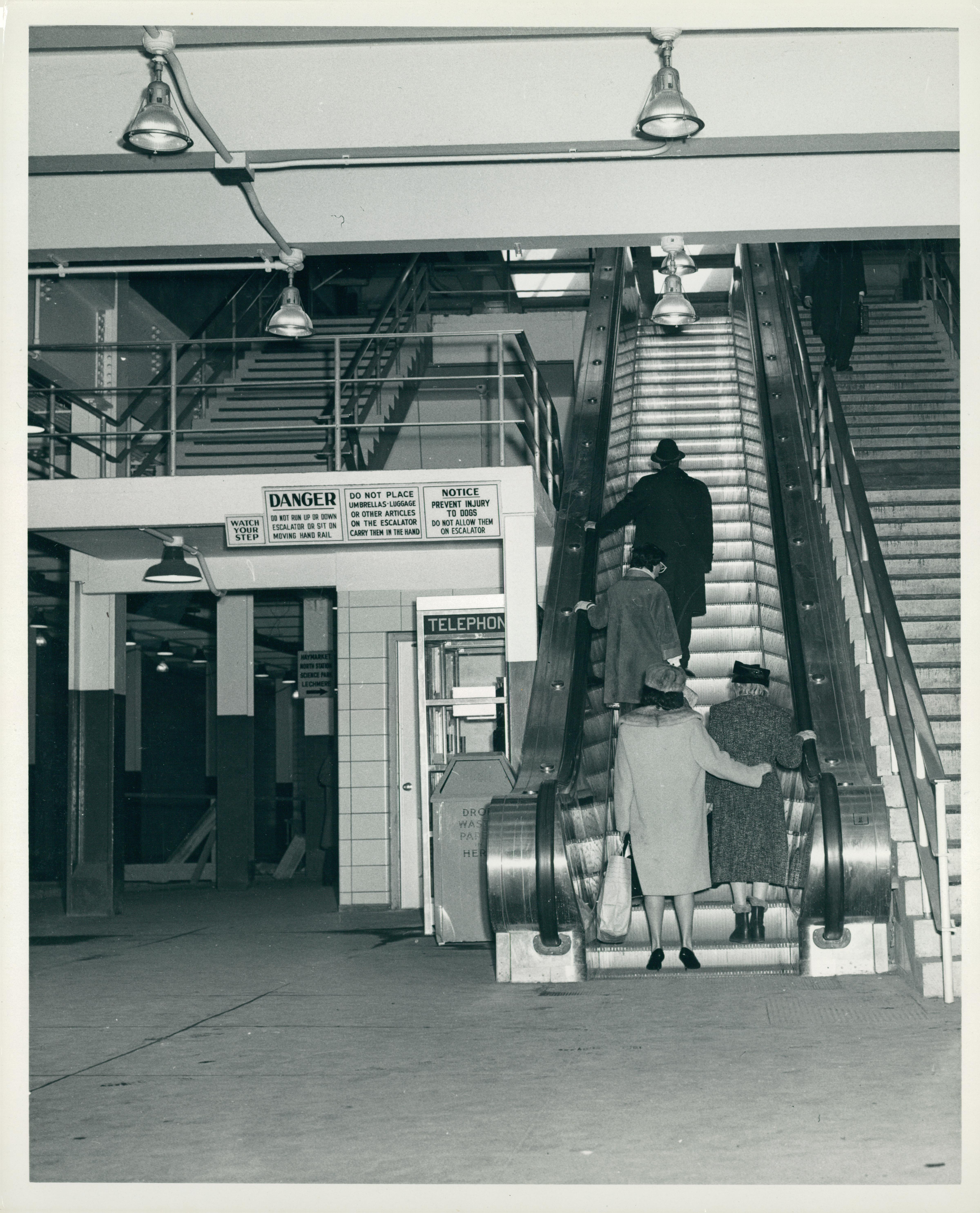
Riders at the then-recently renovated station in 1964

Boston City Hall Plaza replaced Scollay Square in the early 1960s. Scollay Square station was wholly renovated, and the northbound tunnel was realigned to accommodate the foundation of Boston City Hall. The work drastically altered the shape of Brattle Loop and provided a new northbound-to-southbound turnback loop. The stairways to the lower level were relocated, and a fare lobby was built in a low brick structure at the surface. The 1963-built headhouse was often described as resembling a bunker or a cave, even by MBTA management. Government Center station was dedicated on October 28, 1963, though the new loop was not activated until November 18, 1964, when the Commonwealth Avenue line was extended from Park Street to Government Center. Despite the new name, several tiles mosaics reading "Scollay Under" and "S" were still extant and gradually uncovered over the years.

On August 26, 1965, as part of a wholesale rebranding of the system, the MBTA (formed in 1964 to replace the MTA) designated the remaining streetcar routes as the Green Line and the East Boston Tunnel line as the Blue Line. In 1968–69, a "Phase I" modernization added false ceilings, fluorescent lights, and other aesthetic upgrades.

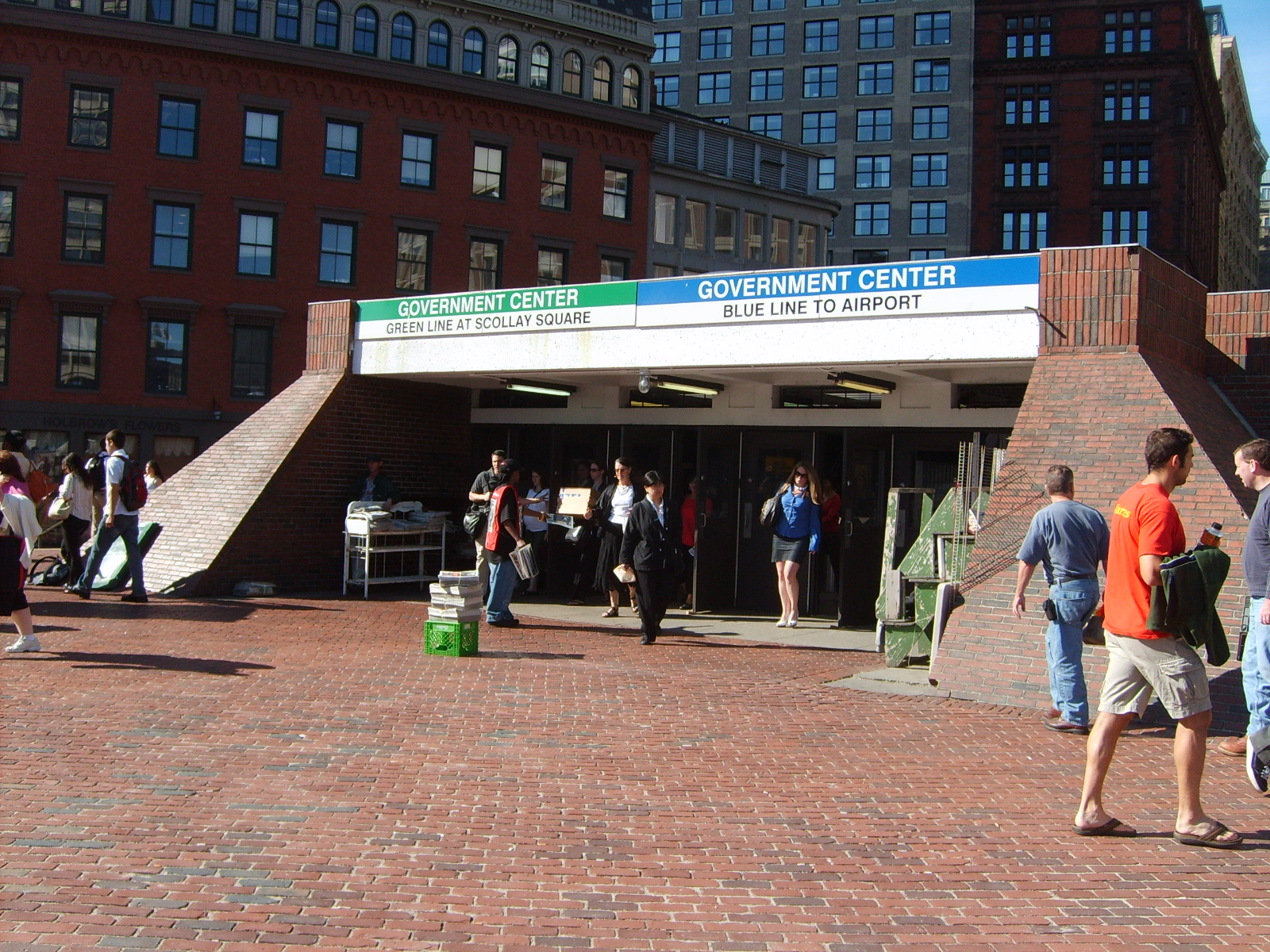
A low brick headhouse (seen here in 2007) was an iconic but disliked part of the 1963-renovated station

In the late 1970s, Mary Beams - an artist at Harvard's Carpenter Center for the Visual Arts - painted 19 murals which were placed along the wall behind the Brattle Loop. Although intended to be temporary, they received protective covers in the late 1980s and remained in good condition until the 2014 closure.

On February 11, 1983, the Green Line E branch was shut down by snow for several days; a Government Center-Lechmere shuttle ran in its stead - the first use of the Brattle Loop in three decades. Even after the E branch resumed operations several days later, the shuttle service ran until June 21, 1997. Since, the loop was used only for temporary car storage, largely during events at Boston Garden (later TD Garden) and after the morning peak.

=== Renovation ===
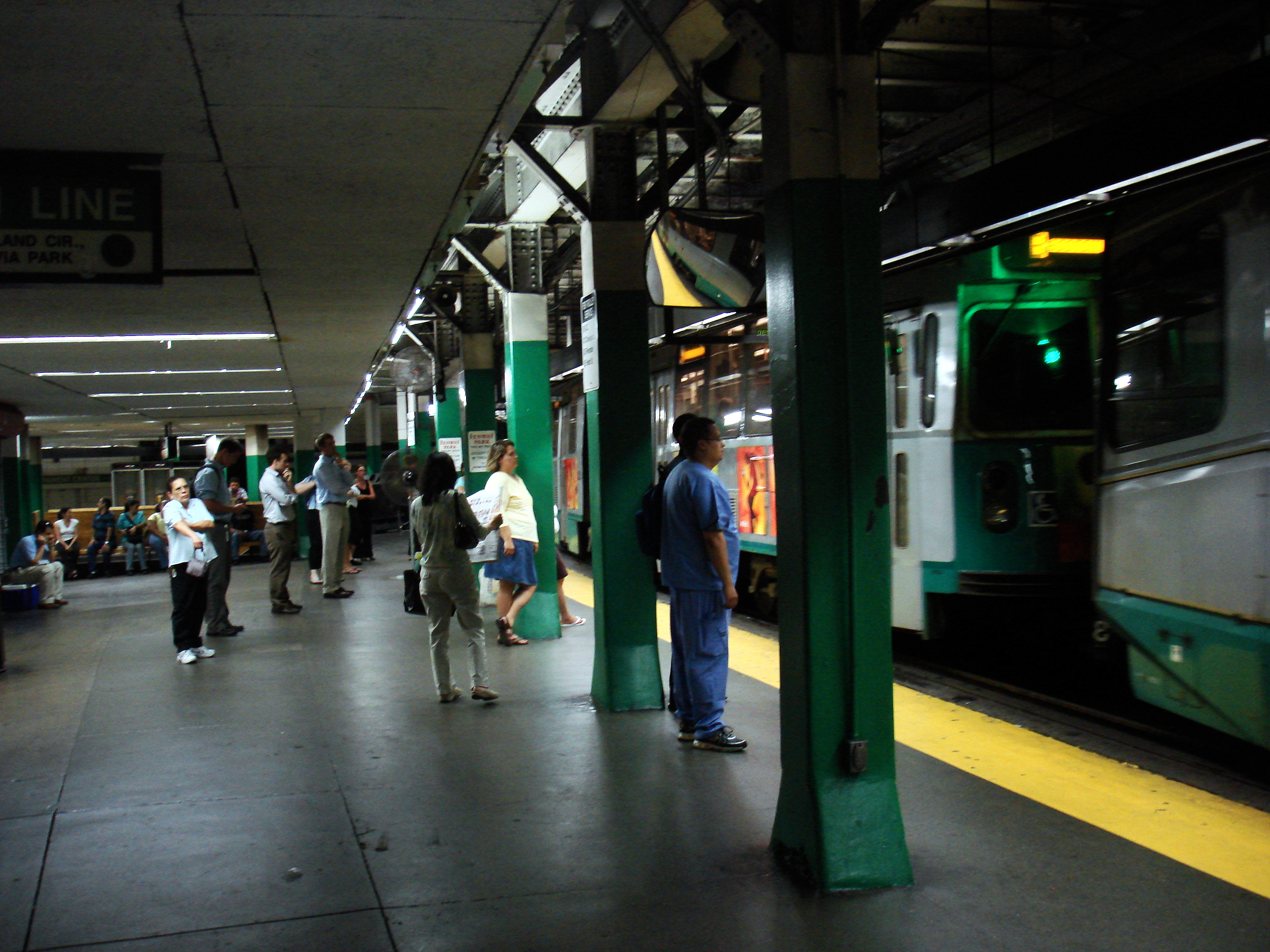
A westbound Green Line train at the station in 2007, before renovation

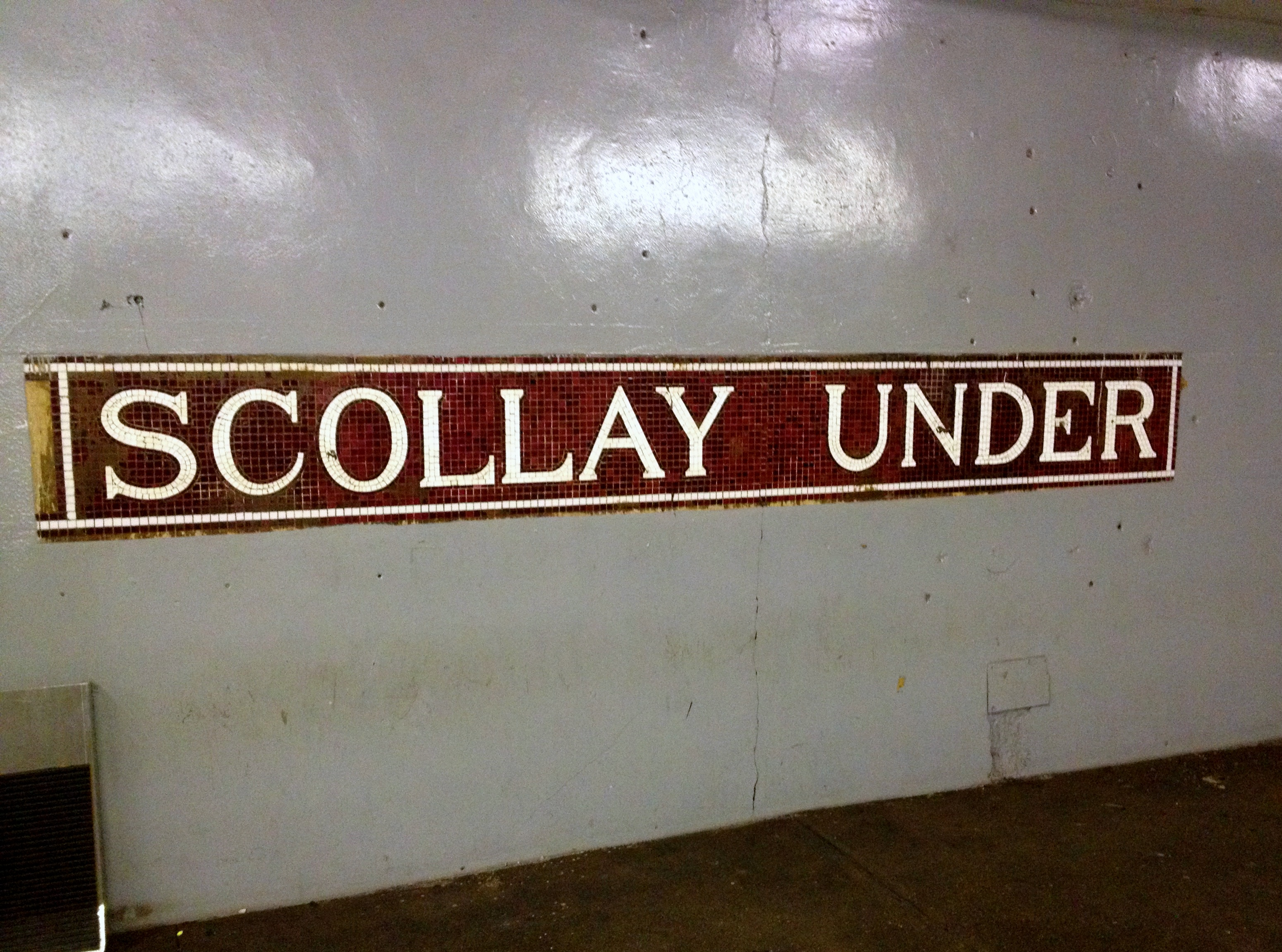
One of the historic "Scollay Under" signs visible before closure; several more were uncovered during demolition of the 1963-built station.

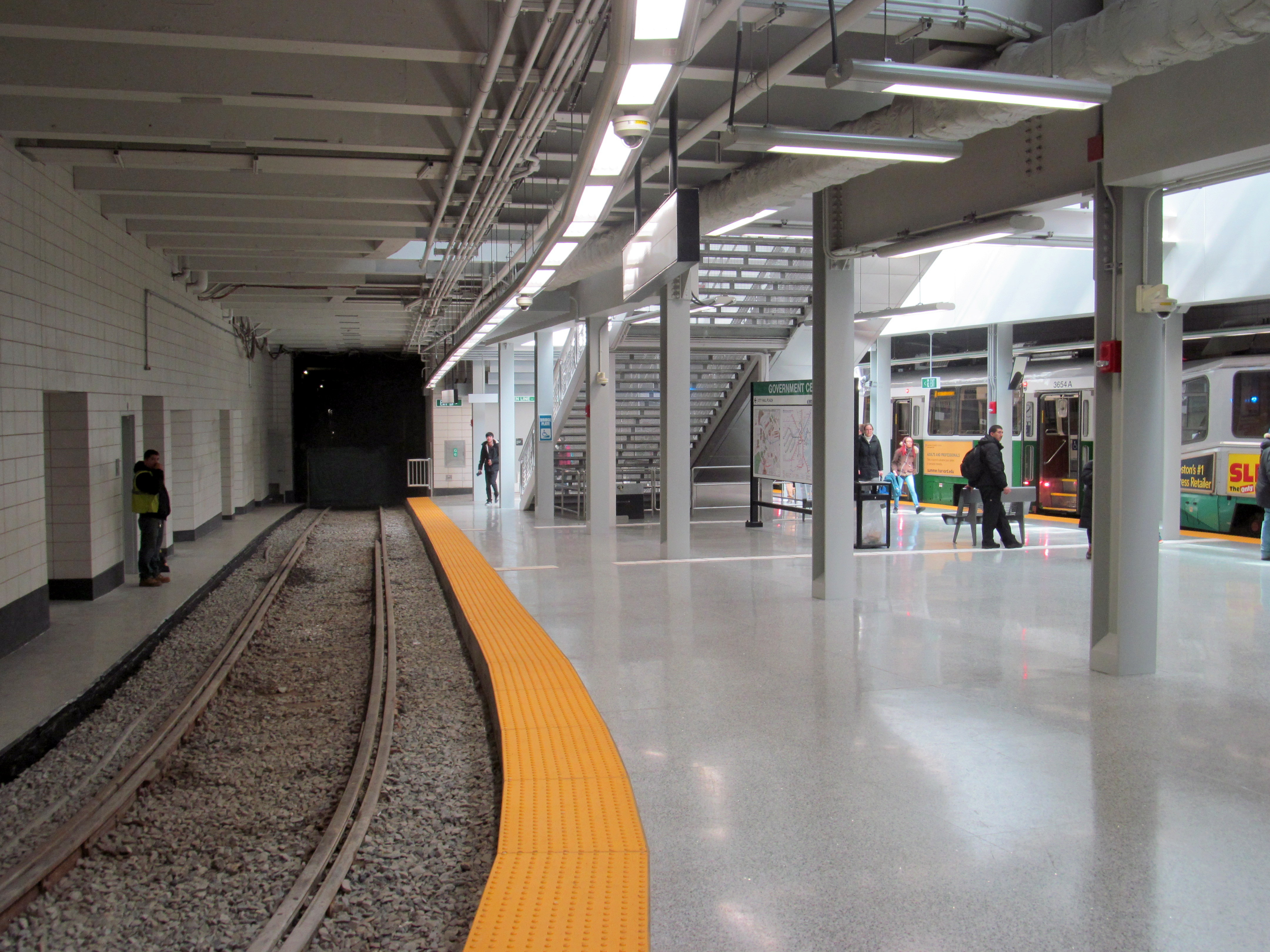
The Green Line platform on reopening day

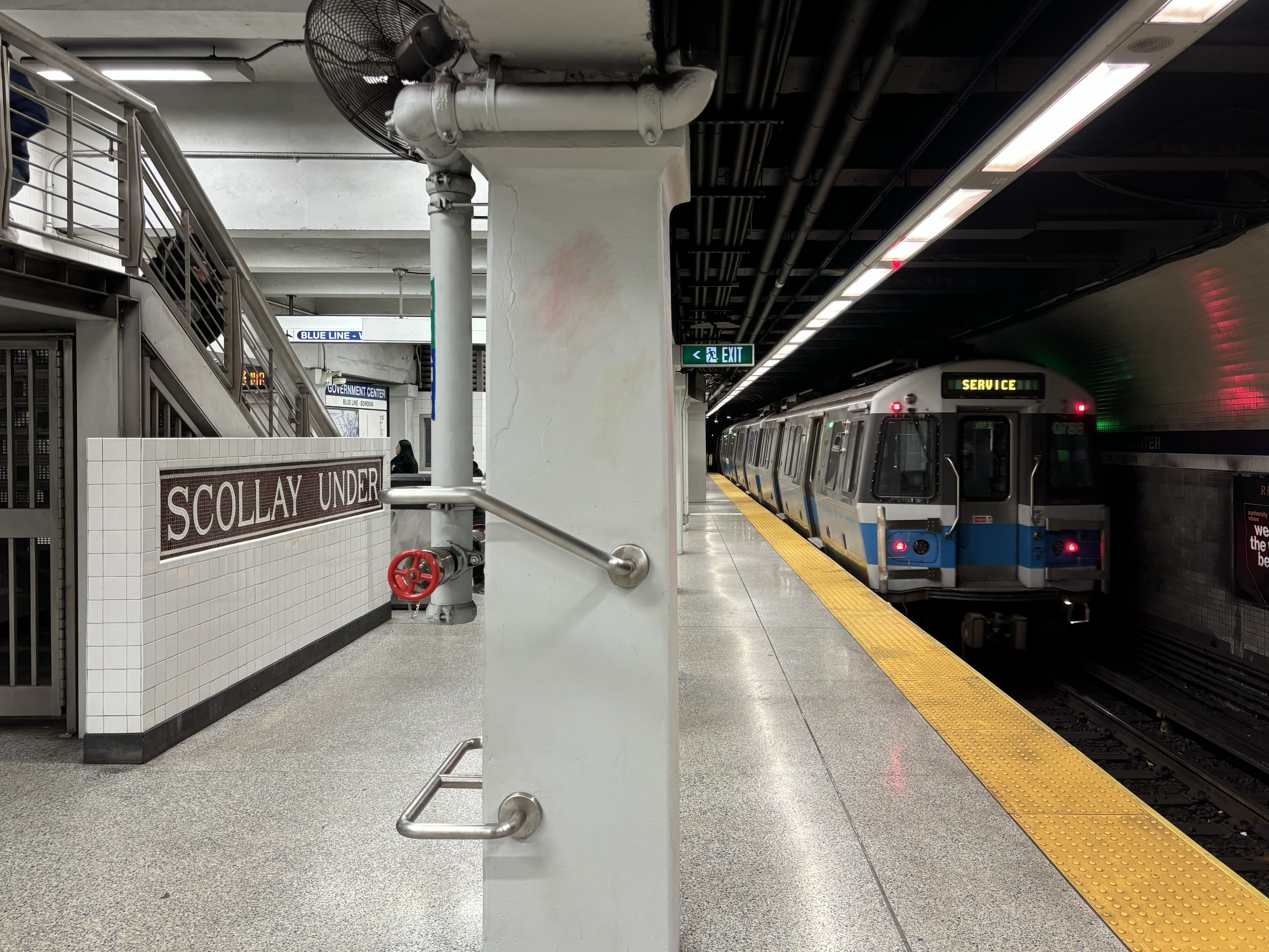
A westbound Blue Line train leaving the renovated station in 2024

In 1991, the state agreed to build a set of transit projects as part of an agreement with the Conservation Law Foundation (CLF), which had threatened a lawsuit over auto emissions from the Central Artery/Tunnel Project (Big Dig). Among these projects was modernization of a number of Blue Line stations, to be complete by the end of 1998. Due to its cost, complexity, and the need to completely shut down a major transfer station, Government Center was the last of 80 key stations to be upgraded for accessibility. Original plans in the 1990s called for the project to add two new entrances to the station, using the former west entrance to the Blue Line level and the former Brattle Loop entrance to the Green Line level. The Blue Line entrance would be close to Bowdoin station, allowing it to be closed. By 2000, the MBTA planned for an asymmetrical glass design for the main headhouse, which was to share design elements with the Community Arcade being built alone Cambridge Street. Construction was then expected to begin in 2001.

The additional Green Line entrance was cut during preliminary design, but the Blue Line entrance was kept; until at least 2011, the MBTA still planned to close Bowdoin after Government Center was renovated. However, by 2013, the MBTA decided not to construct the planned west entrance at Government Center, and to instead build only a less-expensive emergency exit.

The main construction contract was awarded to Barletta Heavy Division in July 2013, and site preparation began in mid-November 2013. On March 22, 2014, Government Center station closed for two years for the reconstruction, which included new elevators, station entrance and lobbies, emergency exit-only structure on Cambridge Street between Court and Sudbury Street, escalators, LED signage, expanded fare collection area, upgraded back-up electrical power supply, improved interior finishes, station lighting, mechanical systems, and public address system. The abandoned side platform was almost completely tiled over. Additional vendor retail space was provided on both Green Line and Blue Line platforms. The platform levels feature terrazzo flooring color-coded to the lines.

During Government Center station's closure, Green Line trains passed through but did not stop at the station. For the duration of the closure, the B branch was cut back to Park Street (after the reopening of Government Center station, this would later be modified to keeping it at as the terminus permanently for five more years), while the D branch was cut to Park Street at rush hours and North Station at other times. The "C" and "E" branches kept their usual terminals. Bowdoin station was kept open for all MBTA operating hours (for the first time since 1981) during the closure. A shuttle bus, the 608 Haymarket via Government Center Loop route, operated in a loop from Haymarket station via State Street station, Government Center station, and Bowdoin station.

During the first two months of renovations, two additional Scollay Under tile signs were uncovered on the Blue Line level. After the first sign was discovered in April, the MBTA announced that it would be restored and placed in the renovated station, similar to previously found mosaics at South Station and Arlington. In total, five 'Scollay Under', one 'Scollay', and two single-letter mosaics were restored. An original faregate, ticket booth, and ceiling arches were also found. The 1970s Mary Beams murals - made of house paint on plywood - did not meet fire code for installation in the rebuilt station. Instead, they were sold at auction in October 2015, with the proceeds going to an enamel commemorative panel and new artworks placed in the new station.

By September 2014, demolition was completed and the steel frame of the new glass headhouse had been erected. At that point, the project was on schedule and on budget. In July 2015 the MBTA announced that the project was still on schedule for a Spring 2016 reopening. In August 2015, the MBTA revealed that the glass used on the headhouse was defective due to poor workmanship, with failed seals between the double-paned glass causing fogging. The glass was replaced at the contractor's expense and did not affect the project's schedule.

On February 2, 2016, the MBTA announced that the station would reopen on March 26, 2016, and that the project was within its budget. On February 19, the MBTA tested multicolored LED lights to illuminate the glass headhouse. After several unpublicized notices, the MBTA announced on March 9 that the station would open on March 21 instead, with a ceremony at 11:45am and full opening an hour later. On the radio command of Governor Charlie Baker, service to the station resumed at 12:43pm.

Design and engineering for the station cost $25 million; the MBTA estimated the construction cost would be $91 million. The primary construction contract was for $82 million, and total construction cost was $88 million. The new station headhouse design was heavily criticized in a monthly architectural review by the social commentator and critic James Howard Kunstler. The headhouse has also been criticized for blocking the view of Old North Church from Tremont Street.

Since the loop opened in 1964, Government Center has been a terminus for scheduled service on one or more branches except for the 2014–2016 closure, 1980–1982, and a short period in 1967. It was the terminus for D branch service from 2016 to October 24, 2021, when it became instead the terminus for B and C branch service as part of preparations for the 2022 opening of the Green Line Extension. Government Center was the northern terminus of the Green Line from August 22 to September 18, 2022; the closure of the northern section allowed for final integration of the Medford Branch, elimination of a speed restriction on the Lechmere Viaduct, demolition of the Government Center Garage, and other work.
