= Butler (disambiguation) =

A butler is a domestic servant, generally in a large household and usually the senior male servant.

Butler or Butlers may also refer to:

== People and fictional characters ==
- Butler (surname), including a list of people and fictional characters
- Butler (given name), a list of people
- Buttlar (noble family), also spelled Butler, an old German noble family
- Butler dynasty, a noble family prominent for several centuries in Ireland

== Places ==
=== Antarctica ===
- Butler Glacier
- Butler Island (Antarctica)
- Butler Nunataks
- Butler Passage
- Butler Peaks
- Butler Rocks
- Butler Summit

=== Australia ===
- Butler, South Australia
- Butler, Western Australia, a suburb of Perth
- Electoral district of Butler, an electorate of the Western Australian Legislative Assembly

=== Canada ===
- Butler, Manitoba
- Butler Range (Canada), a mountain range in British Columbia

=== New Zealand ===
- Butler Range (Canterbury), South Island
- Butler Range (West Coast), South Island
- Butler River

=== United States ===
- Butler, Alabama, a town
- New Kingman-Butler, Arizona, an unincorporated community and census-designated place commonly called Butler
- Butler, Georgia, a city
- Butler, Illinois, a village
- Butler, Indiana, a city
- Butler, Kentucky, a home rule-class city
- Butler, Maryland, an unincorporated community
- Butler, Missouri, a city
- Butler, New Jersey, a borough
- Butler, New York, a town
- Butler, Ohio, a village
- Butler, Oklahoma, a town in Custer County
- Butler, Delaware County, Oklahoma, a census-designated place
- Butler, Pennsylvania, a city
- Butler, South Dakota, a town
- Butler, Tennessee, an unincorporated community
- Butler, Bastrop County, Texas, an unincorporated community
- Butler, Freestone County, Texas, an unincorporated community
- Butler, Clark County, Wisconsin, a town
- Butler, Waukesha County, Wisconsin, a village
- Atwood, Nevada, also known as Butler
- Butler Brook, New York
- Butler Canyon, Arizona
- Butler County (disambiguation)
- Butler Creek (disambiguation)
- Butler Farm, Swedesboro, New Jersey, on the National Register of Historic Places
- Butler Reservoir, New Jersey
- Butler Township (disambiguation)
- Butler Valley (Arizona)
- Camp Butler, original name of Camp Misery, an American Civil War Union Army camp
- Fort Butler (disambiguation)
- Lake Butler (disambiguation)

=== Outer space ===
- 13543 Butler, an asteroid

== Companies ==
- Butler Air Transport, a defunct Australian company
- Butler Amusements, an entertainment company
- Butler Hotel, Seattle, Washington
- Butler International, a defunct engineering services firm based in Fort Lauderdale, Florida
- Butlers (company) (BUTLERS GmbH & Co KG), a German retail chain
- Butlers Chocolates, an Irish-owned manufacturer of luxury chocolate and chocolate products

== Films ==
- The Butler, a 1913 American film produced by the Foster Photoplay Company
- The Butler (1916 film), an American comedy
- The Butler, a 2013 American film

== Schools ==
- Butler University, a liberal arts university in Indianapolis, Indiana
- Butler College, one of the six residential colleges of Princeton University
- Butler College (Texas), a former coeducational black school in Tyler, Texas
- Butler Community College, El Dorado, Kansas
- Butler College (Perth), a public high school in Perth, Australia
- Butler High School (disambiguation)
- Butler Elementary School (disambiguation)
- Butler School (disambiguation)

== Sports ==
- Butler Bucks, a minor league baseball team based in Butler, Pennsylvania, from 1905 until 1908
- Butler Bulldogs, the sports teams of Butler University, Indianapolis, Indiana
- Butler Grizzlies, the sports teams of Butler Community College, El Dorado, Kansas
- Butler Tigers, a baseball team based in Butler, Pennsylvania, from 1935 to 1951
- Butler (basketball), a 1906–07 Central Basketball League team in Butler, Ohio
- Butler National Golf Club, a private golf club in Oak Brook, Illinois

== Titles ==
- Baron Butler, a title created twice, once in the Peerage of Ireland and once in the Peerage of England
- Butler baronets, two baronetcies in the Baronetage of Ireland and two in the Baronetage of the United Kingdom

== Transportation ==
- Butler railway station, in Perth, Western Australia, Australia
- Butler station (MBTA), in Boston, Massachusetts, United States
- Butler station (New Jersey), in Morris County, New Jersey, United States
- Butler Blackhawk, a 1928 American biplane
- Butler Petrol Cycle, considered by many to be the first British car

== Other uses ==
- USS Butler, a World War II United States Navy destroyer
- Butler Medal, a military decoration of the United States Army issued in 1865 to African Americans
- Butler (software), automating application for Mac OS X
- Butler Act, a 1925 Tennessee law prohibiting public school teachers from denying the Biblical account of man's origin
- Butler Block, a building in Uxbridge, Massachusetts
- Butler group, in mathematics
- Butler Hospital, Providence, Rhode Island
- Butler Institute of American Art, Youngstown, Ohio, a museum
- Butler Library, Columbia University
- Butler matrix, a beamforming network used to feed a phased array of antenna elements
- Butler oscillator
- Butler Review, a 2004 British report about the intelligence on Iraq's weapons of mass destruction
- Butlers: Chitose Momotose Monogatari, a Japanese anime television series
- "The Butler", a short story written by Roald Dahl in the collection The Great Automatic Grammatizator

== See also ==
- Pagan the Butler (died c. 1149), lord of Oultrejordain in the Kingdom of Jerusalem
- Lucan the Butler, in Arthurian legend King Arthur's servant
- Battler (disambiguation)
- Butler House (disambiguation), various buildings
