= Butler House =

Butler House may refer to:

in the United Kingdom

- Butler House, County Durham, UK

in Ireland

- Butler House, Kilkenny

in the United States

- Noble-McCaa-Butler House, Anniston, AL, listed on the National Register of Historic Places (NRHP) in Alabama
- Charles Butler House (Childersburg, Alabama), NRHP-listed in Alabama
- Dr. John L. Butler House, Sheridan, AR, NRHP-listed
- Butler-Matthews Homestead, Tulip, AR, NRHP-listed
- Butler House (Pueblo, Colorado), listed on the NRHP in Colorado
- Butler-McCook Homestead, Hartford, CT, NRHP-listed
- James Butler House, West Hartford, CT, NRHP-listed
- Roger Butler House, Wethersfield, CT, NRHP-listed
- James D. and Alice Butler House, Deerfield Beach, FL, NRHP-listed
- Hiram Butler House, Kennesaw, GA, listed on the NRHP in Georgia
- James and Clara Butler House, Blakely, GA, NRHP-listed
- Morris-Butler House, Indianapolis, IN, NRHP-listed
- Gen. William O. Butler House, Carrollton, KY, NRHP-listed
- Butler-Greenwood Plantation, St. Francisville, LA, NRHP-listed
- Wright Butler House, Cumberland, MD, NRHP-listed
- Butler House (Oxon Hill, Maryland), NRHP-listed
- Pierce and Walter Butler House, St. Paul, MN, NRHP-listed
- A. B. Butler House, Portland, ME, listed on the NRHP in Maine
- Emmett Butler House, Hibbing, MN, NRHP-listed
- Decatur N. Butler House, Liberty, MS, listed on the NRHP in Mississippi
- Johnson-Butler House, Aberdeen, MS, listed on the NRHP in Mississippi
- Butler House (St. Louis, Missouri), NRHP-listed
- Butler Farm, Swedesboro, NJ, NRHP-listed
- Walter Butler Homestead, Fonda, NY, NRHP-listed
- Howell-Butler House, Roseboro, NC, NRHP-listed
- J. G. Butler House, Dublin, OH, listed on the NRHP in Ohio
- Charles Butler House (Franklin, Ohio), NRHP-listed
- Cyrus Butler House, Birmingham, OH, listed on the NRHP in Ohio
- Butler House (West Chester, Pennsylvania), NRHP-listed
- Simerly-Butler House, Hampton, TN, NRHP-listed
- Butler House (Mountain City, Tennessee), NRHP-listed
- William F. Butler House, St. George, UT, listed on the NRHP in Utah
- Butler-Wallin House, Salt Lake County, UT, NRHP-listed
- Roswell Butler House, Essex, VT, NRHP-listed
- Butler House (Stowe, Vermont), Stowe, VT
- Butler-Jackson House, Everett, WA, listed on the NRHP in Washington
- Norman Francis Butler House, Walla Walla, WA, listed on the NRHP in Washington

== See also ==
- Charles Butler House (disambiguation)
