= Butler station =

Butler station may refer to:

- Butler station (MBTA), a light rail station in Boston, Massachusetts, United States
- Butler station (New Jersey), a former railway station now used as a museum in Morris County, New Jersey, United States
- Butler railway station, in Perth, Western Australia, Australia
- the work or waiting area for a domestic butler

== See also ==
- Butler (disambiguation)
