= Butler Creek =

Butler Creek may refer to the following streams:

- Butler Creek (Elk River tributary), Arkansas and Missouri
- Butler Creek (White River tributary), Arkansas and Missouri
- Butler Creek (Nine Partners Creek tributary), Pennsylvania

== See also ==
- Little Butler Creek
