= Butler City =

Butler City may refer to multiple historic place names:

- Tonopah, Nevada (originally named Butler City after founder Jim Butler)
- Blaine, Kansas (originally named Butler City after Thomas A. Butler)

== See also ==
- Butler (disambiguation)
