= Butler School =

Butler School may refer to schools in the United States:

- Mary Butler School, a K-8 school in Long Beach, California
- Butler School (Oak Brook, Illinois), listed on the NRHP in Illinois
- Butler School (Lowell, Massachusetts), listed on the NRHP in Massachusetts

== See also ==
- Butler Elementary School (disambiguation)
- Butler Middle School
- Butler High School (disambiguation)
- Butler School, Maryland
- Butler Area School District, Pennsylvania
- South Butler County School District, Pennsylvania
