= Butler Township, Indiana =

Butler Township is the name of three townships in the U.S. state of Indiana:

- Butler Township, DeKalb County, Indiana
- Butler Township, Franklin County, Indiana
- Butler Township, Miami County, Indiana

== See also ==
- Butler Township (disambiguation)
