= Camp Butler (disambiguation) =

Marine Corps Base Camp Smedley D. Butler is a U.S. Marine Corps base in Okinawa, Japan.

Camp Butler may also refer to:

- Camp Butler National Cemetery, in Illinois, originally the site of an American Civil War training camp for Union soldiers and a prison camp.
- Camp Misery, in Virginia, a Union camp originally known as Camp Butler
