= Butler, Wisconsin =

Butler is the name of some places in the U.S. state of Wisconsin:

- Butler, Clark County, Wisconsin, a town
- Butler, Waukesha County, Wisconsin, a village
