= Hazard Rock =

Hazard Rock (64°59′S 63°44′W) is a small isolated rock, 1 metre (3 ft) high, lying on the east side of Butler Passage, 2.5 nautical miles (5 km) northeast of Cape Renard, off the west coast of Graham Land, on the Antarctic Peninsula. It was named by Lieutenant Commander F.W. Hunt, Royal Navy, following his survey in 1952. This feature is a hazard to navigation in the low visibility which is frequent in this vicinity.
