= Butler College (disambiguation) =

Butler College (founded 1983) is one of seven residential colleges at Princeton University.

Butler College may also refer to:

- Butler University, formerly Butler College, a university in Indianapolis, Indiana, US, founded in 1855
- Butler College (Texas), a historically black college in Tyler, Texas, US, in existence from 1905 to 1972
- Josephine Butler College, Durham, a college at Durham University, UK, founded in 2006
- Butler College (Perth), a high school in Butler, Perth, Western Australia, opened in 2013

== See also ==
- Butler College Preparatory High School, a high school in Chicago, Illinois, US
- Butler Community College, a community college in Kansas, US
- Butler County Community College, a community college in Pennsylvania, US
- Butler High School (disambiguation)
