= Battler =

Battler or Battlers may refer to:

== Common uses ==
- Battler (underdog), a working-class person who perseveres through their commitments despite adversity
- Combatant, a person entitled to directly participate in hostilities during an armed conflict
- Soldier, a person who is a member of an army
- Warrior, a person specializing in combat or warfare

== Arts and entertainment ==
- Battler (album), a 2009 album by Gregory Douglass
- "The Battler", a 1925 short story by Ernest Hemingway
- The Battlers (novel), a 1941 novel by Kylie Tennant
  - The Battlers, an Australian television miniseries based on the novel
- The Battlers (TV series), an Australian television series
- Battler Ushiromiya, the protagonist of the visual novel series Umineko When They Cry

== Other uses ==
- Barcode Battler, a handheld game console by Epoch Co.
- HMS Battler (D18), an American-built escort aircraft carrier that served with the Royal Navy during the Second World War
- Battler, a local party registered in the Australian state of New South Wales.

== See also ==
- Butler (disambiguation)
- Battle (disambiguation)
