= Little Butler Creek =

Physical characteristics
- Source
  - location: unnamed pond in Jackson Township, Susquehanna County, Pennsylvania
  - elevation: 1,687 feet (514 m)
- Mouth
  - location: Butler Creek in Jackson Township, Susquehanna County, Pennsylvania near Gibson
  - coordinates: 41°49′40″N 75°38′03″W
  - elevation: 1,352 feet (412 m)
- Length: 3.1 mi (5.0 km)
- Basin size: 1.63 sq mi (4.2 km^{2})

Basin features
- Progression: Butler Creek → Nine Partners Creek → Tunkhannock Creek → Susquehanna River → Chesapeake Bay

Little Butler Creek is a tributary of Butler Creek in Susquehanna County, Pennsylvania, in the United States. It is approximately 3.1 miles (5.0 km) long and flows through Jackson Township. The watershed of the creek has an area of 1.63 square miles (4.2 km^{2}). The creek is classified as a Coldwater Fishery and a Migratory Fishery and has wild trout naturally reproducing in it. The surficial geology in the creek's vicinity includes Wisconsinan Till, alluvium, alluvial fan, and bedrock.

== Course ==
Little Butler Creek begins in an unnamed pond in Jackson Township. It flows south-southeast for a few tenths of a mile before entering Little Butler Lake. From the southern end of Little Butler Lake, the creek flows southwest for a few tenths of a mile before turning south and then south-southwest for several tenths of a mile, crossing Pennsylvania Route 492. The creek then turns south for several tenths of a mile before turning southwest and then south-southeast. Several tenths of a mile further downstream, it reaches its confluence with Butler Creek.

Little Butler Creek is approximately 3.1 miles (5.0 km) long. It joins Butler Creek 8.20 miles (13.20 km) upstream of its mouth.

== Geography and geology ==
The elevation near the mouth of Little Butler Creek is 1,352 feet (412 m) above sea level. The elevation near the creek's source is 1,687 feet (514 m) above sea level.

The surficial geology along the lower and upper reaches of Little Butler Creek consists of a till known as Wisconsinan Till. However, in the middle reaches, there is a large area of alluvium and a small patch of alluvial fan. There is also a patch of alluvium further upstream, just below Little Butler Lake, and patches of bedrock consisting of sandstone and shale on nearby hills.

A 27-acre (11 ha) lake known as Little Butler Lake is situated on Little Butler Creek. It is a former kettle hole bog but was dammed several decades ago to create an open lake. It could return to being a bog within several hundred years, though this process would be expedited by removing the dam. The creek is separated from its tributary Butler Creek by two broad, low cols partially filled by till.

== Watershed ==
The watershed of Little Butler Creek has an area of 1.63 square miles (4.2 km^{2}). The stream is entirely within the United States Geological Survey quadrangle of Harford. Its mouth is located near Gibson.

Southwestern Energy Production Company has been issued an Erosion and Sediment Control permit for which one of the receiving waterbodies is Little Butler Creek.

== History ==
Little Butler Creek was entered into the Geographic Names Information System on August 2, 1979. Its identifier in the Geographic Names Information System is 1179494.

A concrete slab bridge carrying Pennsylvania Route 547 over Little Butler Creek was built in 1954 in Jackson Township and is 21.0 feet (6.4 m) long. A bridge rehabilitation/replacement has been proposed and/or slated for a bridge carrying Pennsylvania Route 492 over the creek.

== Biology ==
Wild trout naturally reproduce in Little Butler Creek in its lower 2.48 miles (3.99 km). The creek is classified as a Coldwater Fishery and a Migratory Fishery.

Little Butler Lake, a lake on Little Butler Creek, is listed on A Natural Areas Inventory of Susquehanna County, Pennsylvania. Despite the lake being a flooded former bog, some remnants of bog vegetation remain on floating islands. The Inventory has recommended reforesting the western edge of the lake to protect from nonpoint source pollution like runoff from residences, roads, and fields.

== See also ==
- List of rivers of Pennsylvania
