= Leslie Creek (Nine Partners Creek tributary) =

Physical characteristics
- Source
  - location: near Wolf Hill in New Milford Township, Susquehanna County, Pennsylvania
  - elevation: 1,637 feet (499 m) above sea level
- Mouth
  - location: Nine Partners Creek in Harford Township, Susquehanna County, Pennsylvania near East Lenox
  - coordinates: 41°46′13″N 75°41′12″W
- Length: 4.7 mi (7.6 km)

Basin features
- Progression: Nine Partners Creek → Tunkhannock Creek → Susquehanna River → Chesapeake Bay
- Tributaries
  - left: one unnamed tributary
  - right: four unnamed tributaries

Leslie Creek is a tributary of Nine Partners Creek in Susquehanna County, Pennsylvania, in the United States. It is approximately 4.7 miles (7.6 km) long and flows through New Milford Township and Harford Township. The watershed of the creek has an area of 4.59 square miles (11.9 km^{2}). The creek is not designated as an impaired waterbody. It flows through a lake known as Tingley Lake in its upper reaches. The surficial geology in the vicinity of Leslie Creek mainly includes Wisconsinan Till and alluvium, with some alluvial fan, wetlands, and lakes.

== Course ==
Leslie Creek begins near Wolf Hill in New Milford Township. It flows south for several tenths of a mile, passing through an unnamed pond, entering Harford Township, and passing through another unnamed pond. The creek then turns east before turning south again for a short distance, entering Tingley Lake, where it receives an unnamed tributary from the right. The creek then flows southeast for several tenths of a mile, receiving one unnamed tributary from the right and one from the left before entering a wetland. Here, it turns south for several tenths of a mile before turning south-southeast. After a few tenths of a mile, the creek receives an unnamed tributary from the right and crosses Pennsylvania Route 547. It continues flowing south-southeast for several tenths of a mile before turning south, receiving another unnamed tributary from the right, and turning southeast. After a few tenths of a mile, the creek turns south-southeast for a few tenths of a mile before reaching the end of its valley and turning east. A short distance further downstream, the creek reaches its confluence with Nine Partners Creek.

Leslie Creek is approximately 4.7 miles (7.6 km) long. Leslie Creek joins Nine Partners Creek 4.48 miles (7.21 km) upstream of its mouth.

== Hydrology, geography, and geology ==
The elevation near the mouth of Leslie Creek is 1,040 feet (320 m) above sea level. The elevation near the creek's source is 1,637 feet (499 m) above sea level.

The surficial geology at the mouth of Leslie Creek mainly consists of alluvial fan, with some alluvium. Further upstream, the surficial geology along the creek consists mainly of alluvium, but the sides of the valley have a till known as Wisconsinan Till. In the upper reaches, the surficial geology along the creek mainly consists of Wisconsinan Till, but there is some alluvium, wetlands, and lakes.

Leslie Creek has been described as a "small creek". It passes through a lake known as Tingley Lake in its upper reaches.

Leslie Creek is not designated as an impaired waterbody.

== Watershed and biology ==
The watershed of Leslie Creek has an area of 4.59 square miles (11.9 km^{2}). The creek is entirely within the United States Geological Survey quadrangle of Harford. Its mouth is located within 1 mile (1.6 km) of East Lenox.

The designated use for Leslie Creek is aquatic life.

== History ==
Leslie Creek was entered into the Geographic Names Information System on August 2, 1979. Its identifier in the Geographic Names Information System is 1179216.

According to several local residents in the 1960s, an official 1932 map of the area showed Leslie Creek flowing too far to the east. The creek was described as flowing through the community of Harford in several old deeds and documents.

By 2005, the Pennsylvania Department of Transportation had made plans to reconstruct a bridge carrying Pennsylvania Route 547/Fair Hill Road over Leslie Creek. The bridge, whose purpose was to allow access to the village of Harford, was deemed structurally deficient and functionally obsolete, but contributed to the Harford Historic District.

== See also ==
- Butler Creek (Nine Partners Creek), next tributary of Nine Partners Creek going downstream
- List of rivers of Pennsylvania
