= Milton station (MBTA) =

Light rail station in Milton, Massachusetts, US

Milton
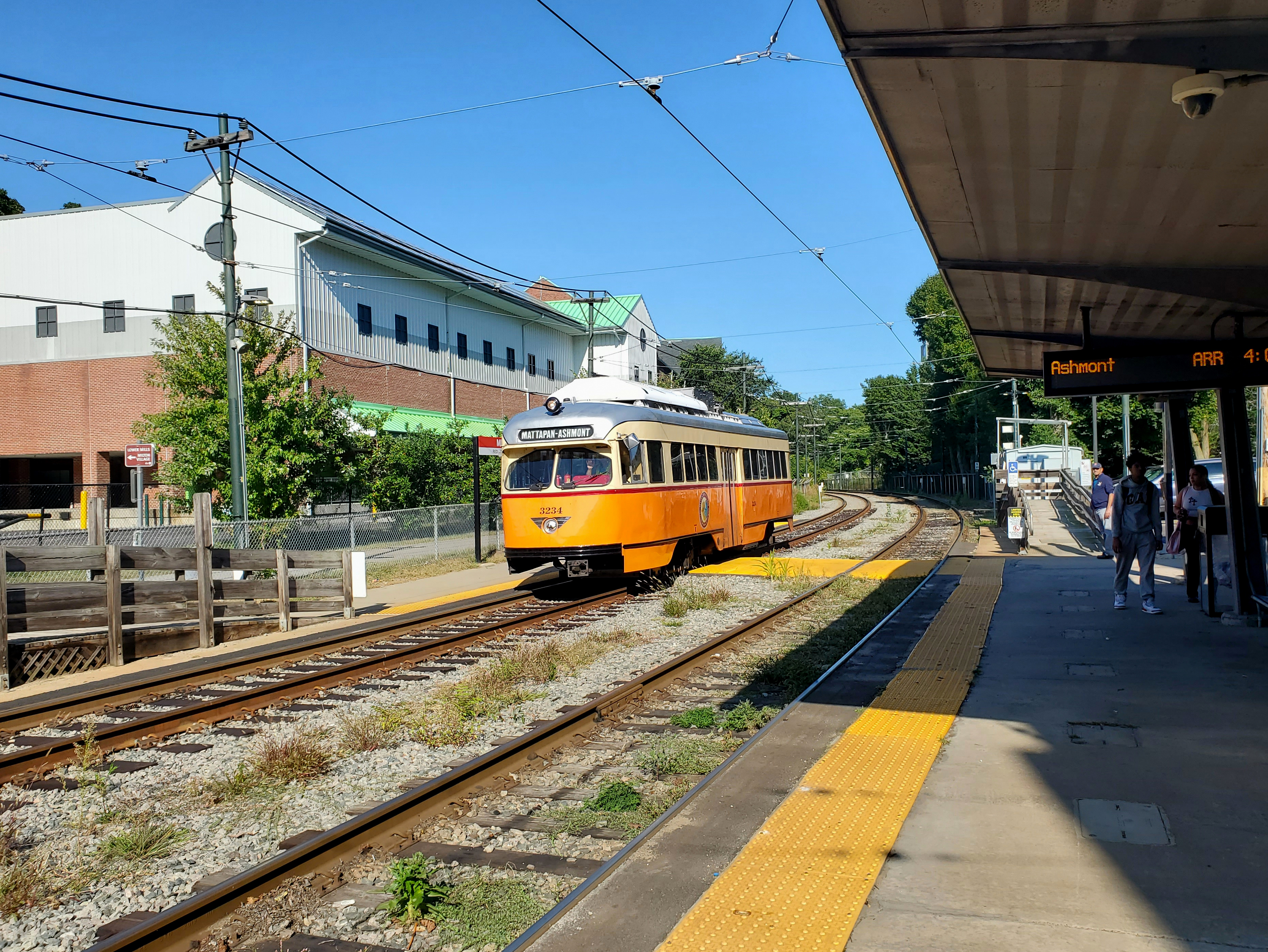
- An outbound streetcar at Milton station in 2024

General information
- Location: 1 Adams Street at 1 Eliot Street; Milton, Massachusetts
- Coordinates: 42.27035°N 71.06727°W
- Lines: Milton Branch, Shawmut Branch
- Platforms: 2 side platforms
- Tracks: 2
- Connections: MBTA bus: 217

Construction
- Parking: 41 spaces
- Cycle facilities: 8 spaces
- Accessible: Yes

History
- Opened: c. 1847–1849; August 26, 1929 (streetcar)
- Rebuilt: 1926–1929; June 24, 2006–December 22, 2007
- Former names: Milton Mills (1848–1871); Milton Lower Mills (1871–1885)

Passengers
- 2025: 257 daily boardings

Services
Preceding station	MBTA	Following station
Central Avenue toward Mattapan	Mattapan Line	Butler toward Ashmont
Former services
Preceding station	New York, New Haven and Hartford Railroad	Following station
Central Avenue toward Mattapan	Boston–Mattapan	Cedar Grove until 1926 toward Boston
Central Avenue toward Mattapan	Boston–Mattapan	Granite Bridge 1926–1929 toward Boston
Location

Milton station is a light rail station in Milton, Massachusetts, served by the Mattapan Line of the MBTA subway system. Located in the Dorchester-Milton Lower Mills Industrial District, the station has two side platforms serving the line's two tracks. It is accessible via wooden ramps on both platforms.

Milton Mills station opened on the Dorchester and Milton Branch Railroad between 1847 and 1849. It was renamed Milton Lower Mills in 1871 and Milton in 1885. The line was converted for streetcar use in 1926–1929, with streetcar service to Milton beginning on August 26, 1929. It was rebuilt for accessibility in 2006–2007.

== History ==
=== Railroad station ===
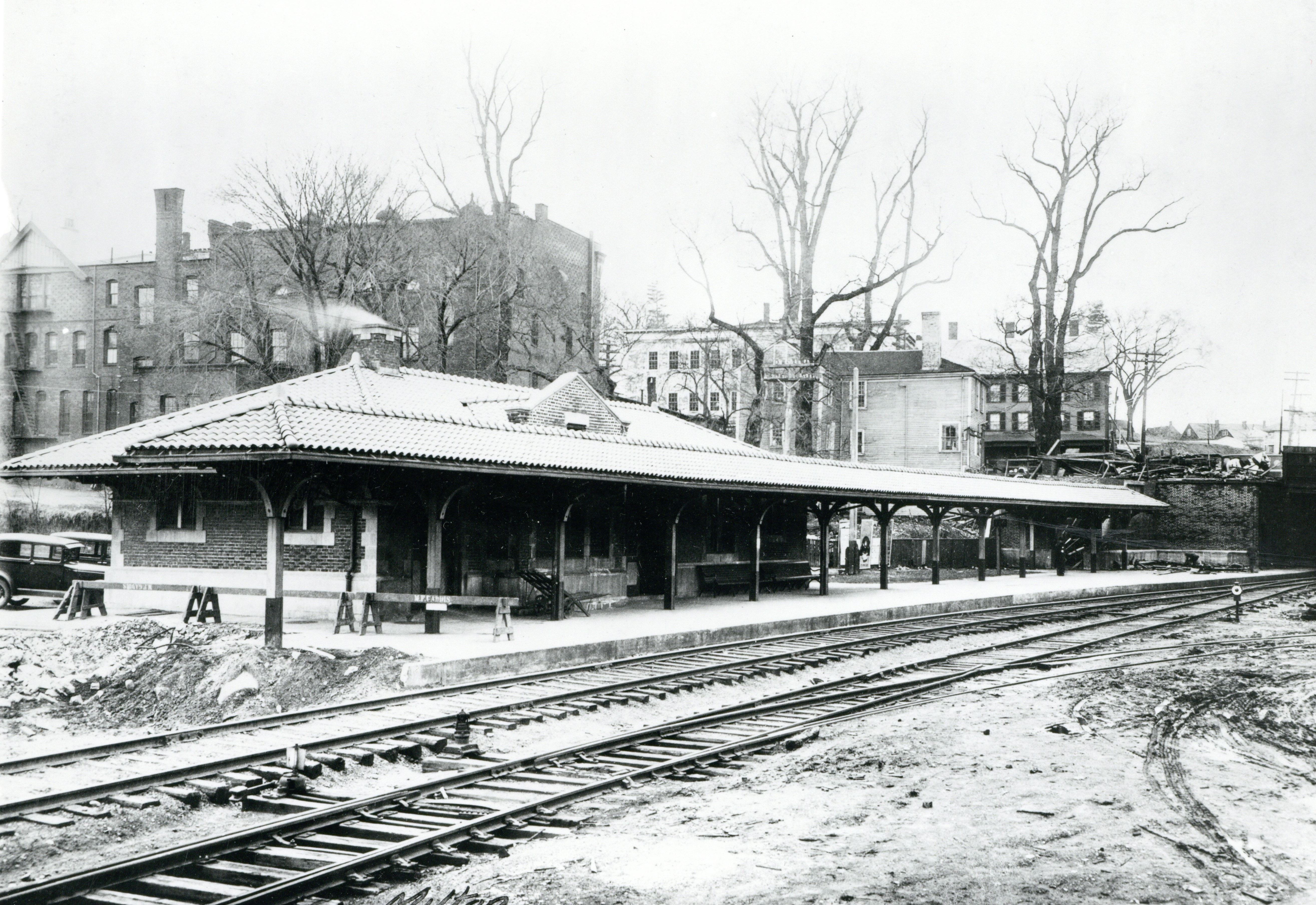
Milton station in 1929, shortly before it was demolished for the streetcar conversion

The Dorchester and Milton Branch Railroad, a subsidiary of the Old Colony Railroad, opened on December 1, 1847. An intermediate station at Milton Mills opened within two years. The station was renamed Milton Lower Mills in 1871. The Shawmut Branch Railroad opened between Harrison Square and Milton Lower Mills on December 2, 1872, and most Mattapan–Boston service began using that line north of Milton Lower Mills.

A new station building was constructed in 1884–85. On February 2, 1885, the station was renamed Milton at the request of residents, who considered the new name "more dignified". The building was destroyed on February 28, 1887, by a fire caused by a lamp explosion. The loss to the railroad was estimated at $20,000 (equivalent to $610,000 in 2024). A temporary station was in use until construction began on a new station on August 30. Some 30 by 80 feet (9.1 m × 24.4 m) in size, it was completed later in 1887.

=== Streetcar station ===
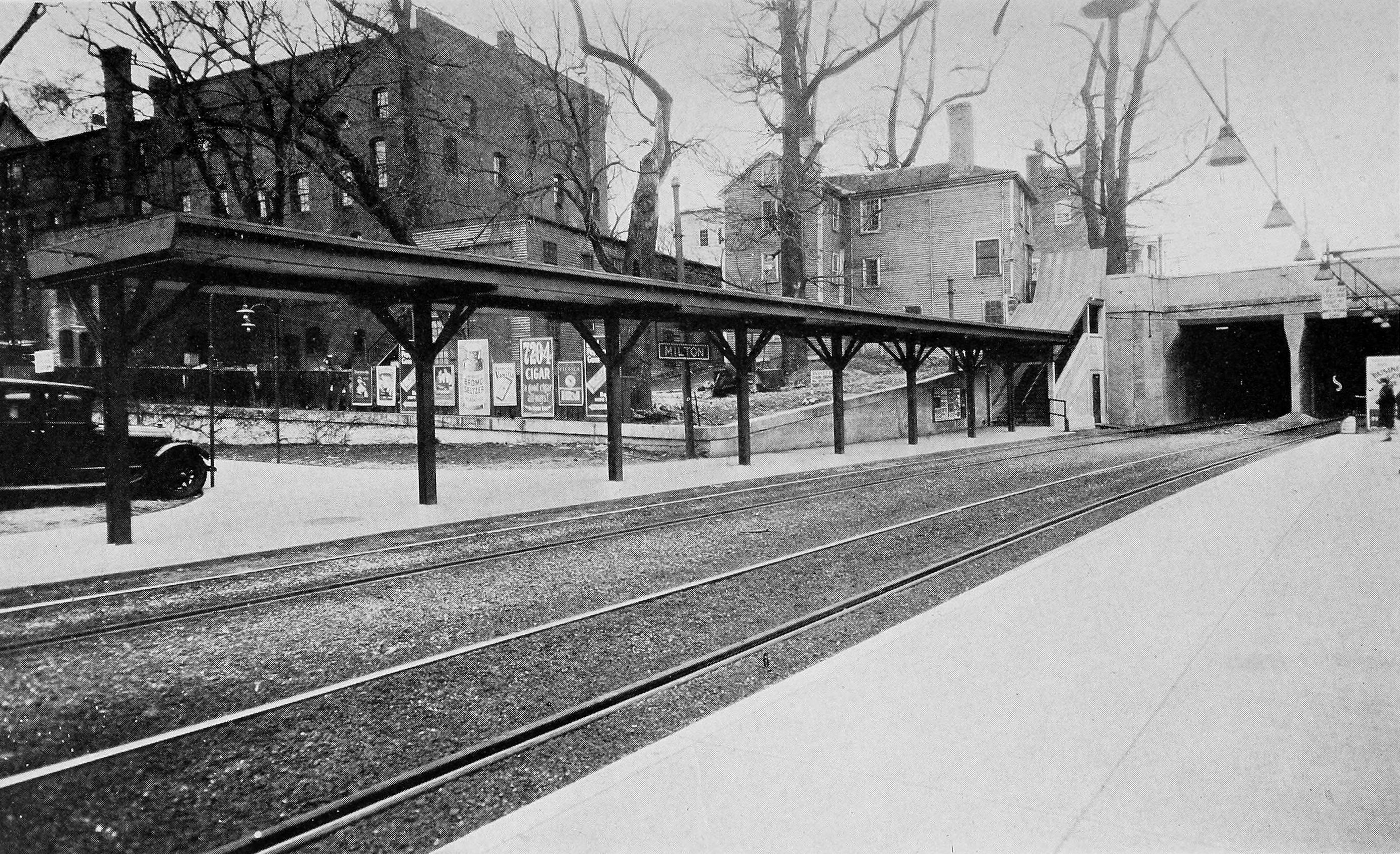
Milton station in 1930

Conversion of the section between Ashmont and Mattapan to an interurban-style streetcar line by the Boston Elevated Railway began in 1926. The former Milton station building was demolished in May 1929. The segment of the Ashmont–Mattapan High Speed Line from Ashmont to Milton was opened on August 26, 1929. Milton was the terminus of the streetcar line until the remaining segment to Mattapan opened on December 21, 1929. The MTA began charging for parking at its stations, including Milton, on November 2, 1953.

On March 18, 1968, the Neponset River flooded the line at Milton station after a 7-inch (180 mm) rainfall. Restoration work began at 6:00 am on March 21 as the waters receded; service was resumed by 4:30 pm. The station flooded again on February 18, 2025.

=== Renovations ===
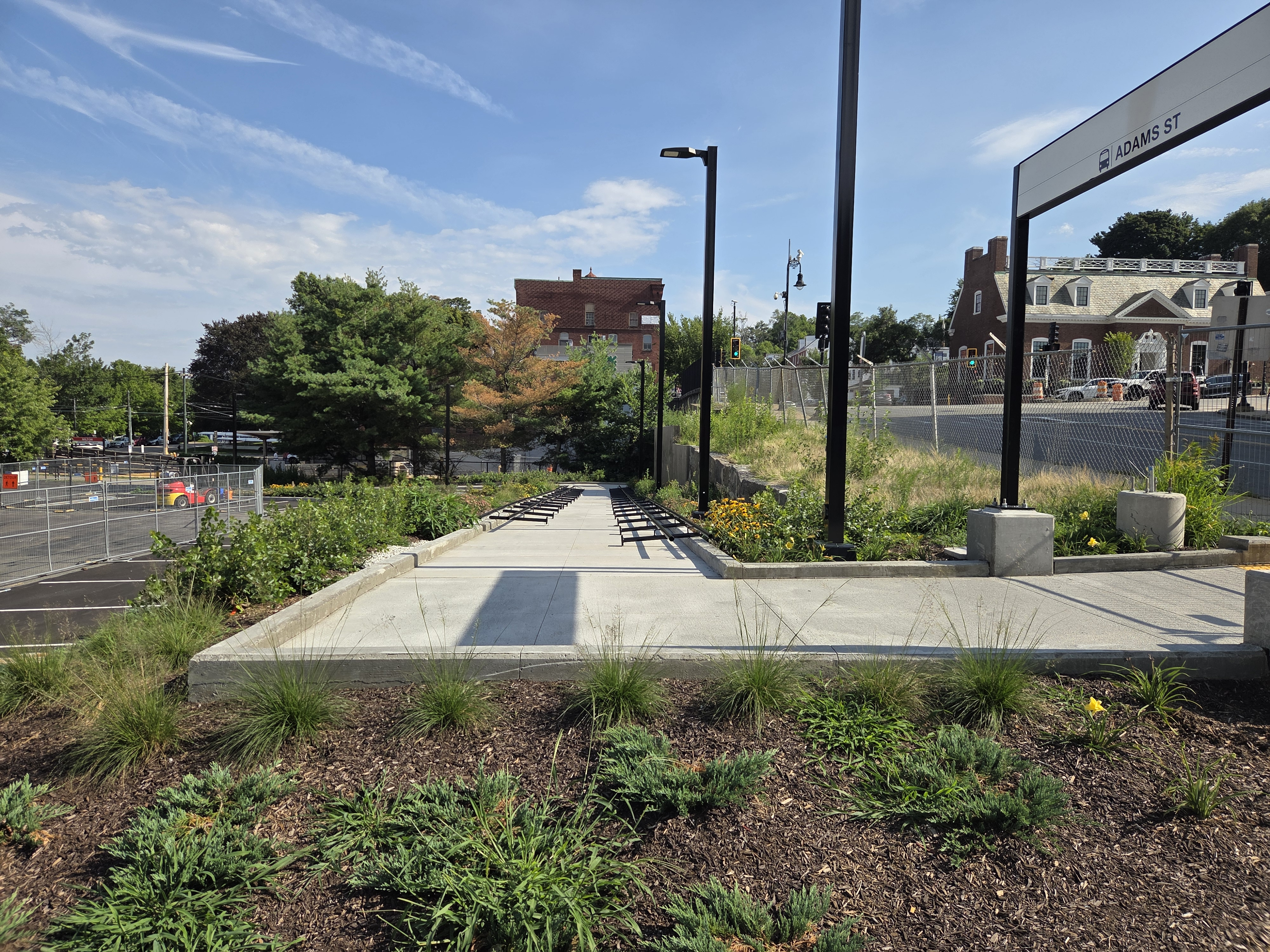
A new ramp to Adams Street near completion in August 2026

In June 2006, Milton station was closed for 18 months while the MBTA renovated stations on the Mattapan Line. Streetcar service was replaced by shuttle buses, and resumed in December 2007.

The staircase to the station from Adams Street – the only entrance not via private parking lots - was closed in 2018 due to deteriorating condition. The MBTA did not repair this staircase because doing so would trigger a larger accessibility renovation of the station, likely including an elevator. In August 2022, the town of Milton threatened to sue the MBTA to force repair of the staircase. The MBTA, in response, indicated it would demolish the staircase rather than repairing it. The Milton board voted in September to sue the MBTA; at that point, the MBTA intended to demolish the staircase by the end of the year. The lawsuit was filed in October 2022. Despite the objections of town officials, including an appeal to state governor Maura Healey, the MBTA demolished the staircase on March 6–9, 2023.

The MBTA plans to convert the line to modern light rail equipment. All stations would have raised platforms for level boarding on the new vehicles. An elevator to the inbound platform would be added at Milton, with an accessible ramp possibly added prior to the main renovation. Construction cost for Milton station was estimated as $11.5 million in 2023. In December 2023, the Milton Conservation Commission approved plans for an accessible path from Adams Street to the southbound platform – an interim measure to improve access to the station. Design for the ramp was completed in May 2025, with a contract awarded that October. Construction began around April 2026, and a ribbon-cutting ceremony for the opening of the ramp took place that September.
