= Cedar Grove station =

Light rail station in Boston, Massachusetts, US

Cedar Grove
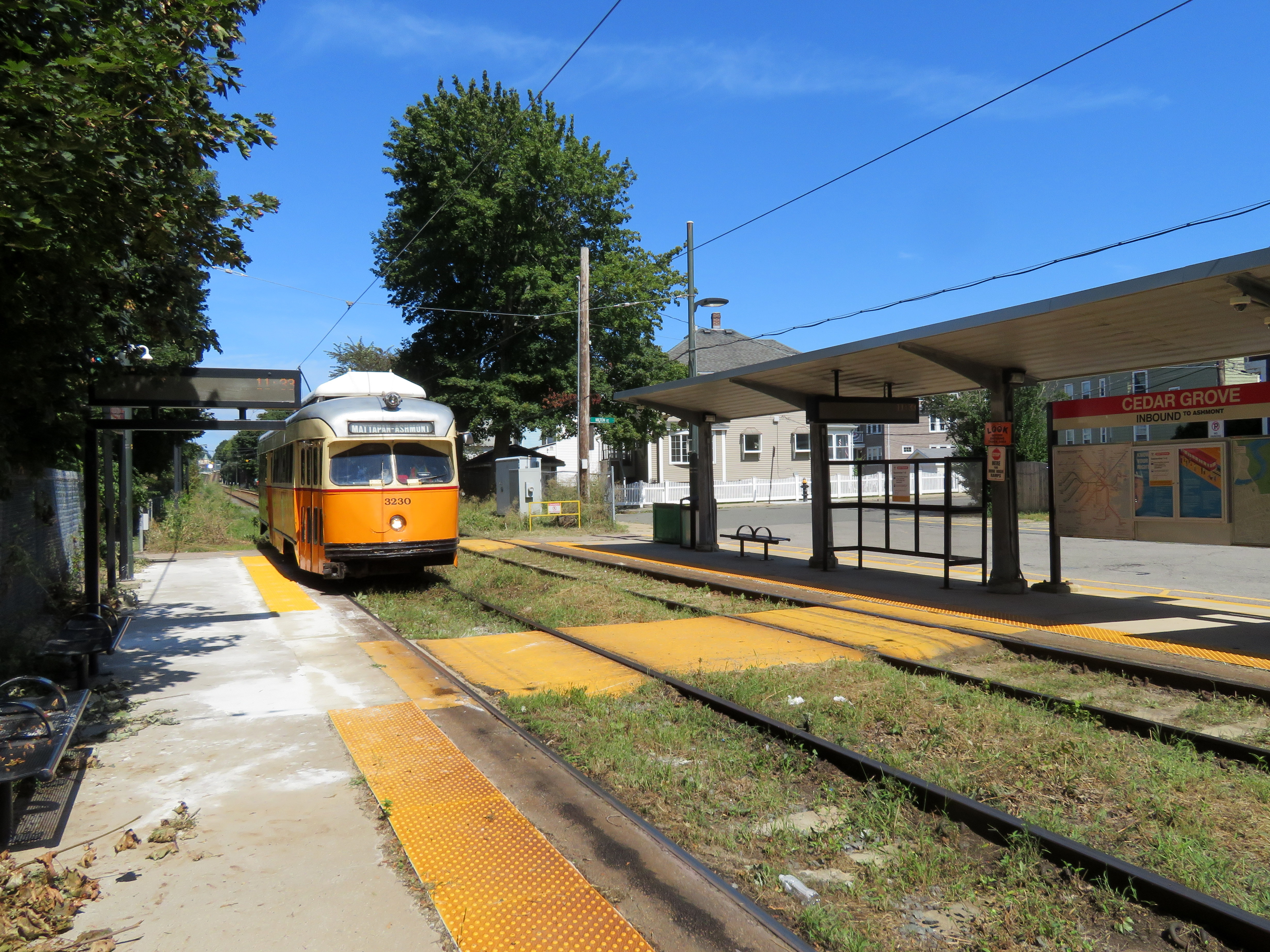
- An outbound streetcar at Cedar Grove in 2018

General information
- Location: Fellsway Street and Milton Street; Boston, Massachusetts
- Coordinates: 42.27960°N 71.06038°W
- Line: Shawmut Branch
- Platforms: 2 side platforms
- Tracks: 2

Construction
- Accessible: Yes

History
- Opened: December 2, 1872
- Rebuilt: September 4, 1926–August 26, 1929; June 24, 2006–December 22, 2007

Passengers
- 2025: 81 daily boardings

Services
Preceding station	MBTA	Following station
Butler toward Mattapan	Mattapan Line	Ashmont Terminus
Former services
Preceding station	New York, New Haven and Hartford Railroad	Following station
Milton toward Mattapan	Boston–Mattapan	Ashmont toward Boston
Location

Cedar Grove station is a light rail station on the Mattapan Line (part of the MBTA Red Line) located in the southern part of the Dorchester neighborhood of Boston, Massachusetts. The station, named for the adjacent Cedar Grove Cemetery, has two side platforms serving the line's two tracks. It is accessible via wooden ramps on both platforms.

== History ==
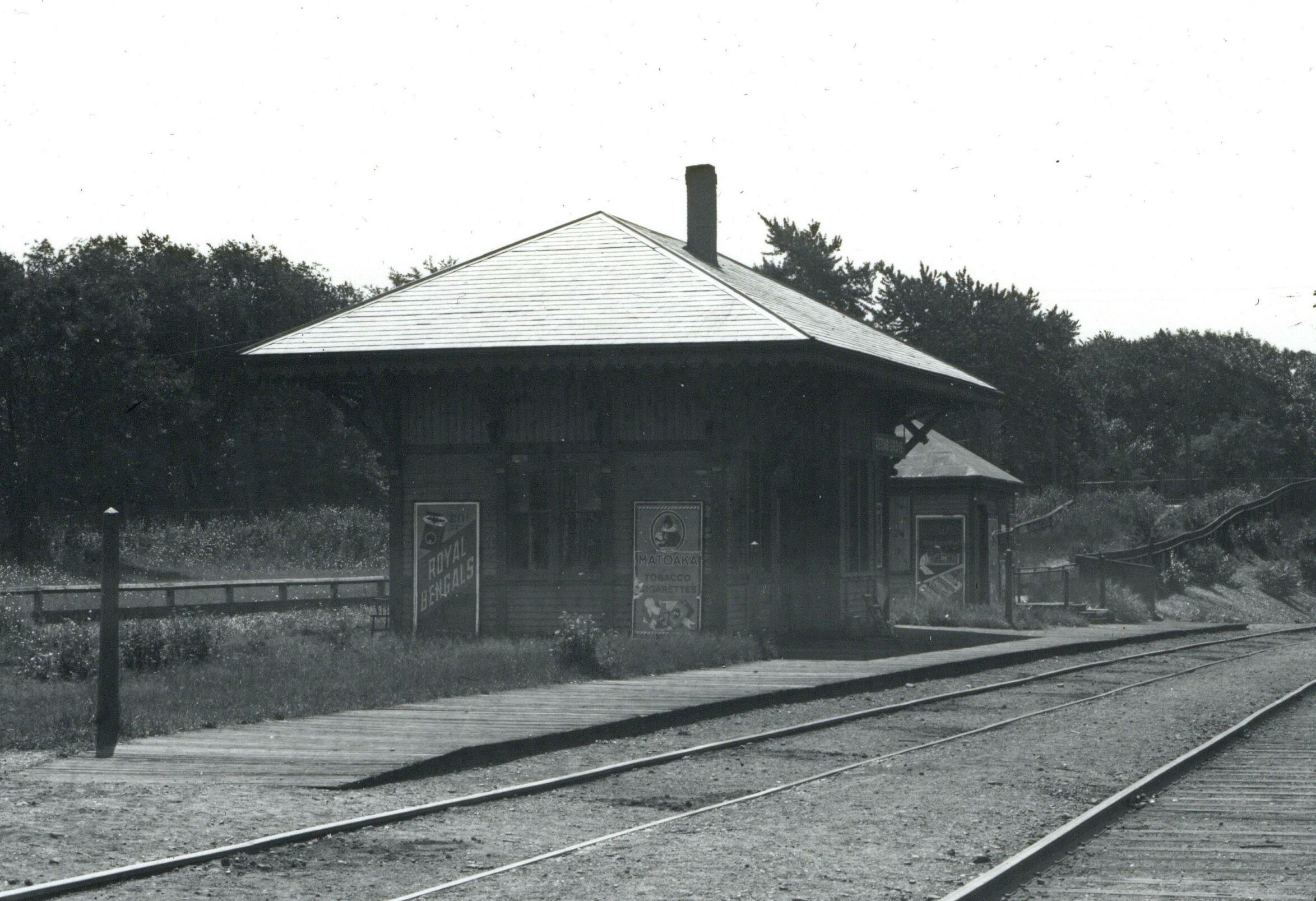
Cedar Grove station in 1923

The Shawmut Branch Railroad, owned by the Old Colony Railroad opened between Harrison Square and Milton Lower Mills on December 4, 1872. One of four intermediate stations was Cedar Grove, built to serve the recently opened Cedar Grove cemetery. The station building was similar to that at Shawmut, though the doors and windows were located differently. The station agent died of rabies in November 1908 after being bitten by a dog which had found its way into the station.

Passenger service on the Shawmut Branch ended on September 4, 1926, for conversion of the line to rapid transit. The first segment of the Mattapan Line, a "high-speed" streetcar line, opened between Ashmont and Milton on August 26, 1929, with Cedar Grove as an intermediate station. The MTA began charging for parking at its stations, including Cedar Grove, on November 2, 1953.

The line was closed for renovations from June 24, 2006, to December 22, 2007. During the closure, all stations on the line were modernized and (except for Valley Road) made accessible. Cedar Grove station received new platforms and canopies, with wooden ramps for accessibility.

The MBTA plans to convert the line to modern light rail equipment. All stations would have raised platforms for level boarding on the new vehicles; Cedar Grove and three other stations would be converted to island platforms. Construction cost for Cedar Grove station was estimated as $6.8 million in 2023.
