= Charles Butler House =

Charles Butler House may refer to:

in the United States

- Charles Butler House (Childersburg, Alabama), listed on the National Register of Historic Places in Talladega County, Alabama
- Charles Butler House (Franklin, Ohio), listed on the NRHP in Warren County, Ohio
