= Nine Partners Creek =

Nine Partners Creek Leslie Creek
- Etymology: association of early settlers who came from Connecticut

Physical characteristics
- Source
  - location: small unnamed pond on a hill in New Milford Township, Susquehanna County, Pennsylvania
  - elevation: 1,615 feet (492 m) above sea level
- Mouth
  - location: Tunkhannock Creek in Lenox Township, Susquehanna County, Pennsylvania near East Lenox
  - coordinates: 41°42′42″N 75°40′16″W
  - elevation: 869 feet (265 m) above sea level
- Length: 10 mi (16 km)

Basin features
- Progression: Tunkhannock Creek → Susquehanna River → Chesapeake Bay
- Tributaries
  - left: Butler Creek
  - right: Leslie Creek

Nine Partners Creek (also known as Leslie Creek) is a tributary of Tunkhannock Creek in Susquehanna County, Pennsylvania, in the United States. It is approximately 10 miles (16 km) long and flows through New Milford Township, Harford Township, and Lenox Township. The watershed of the creek has an area of 38.6 square miles (100 km^{2}). The creek has two named tributaries: Butler Creek and Leslie Creek. The surficial geology in the vicinity of Nine Partners Creek includes Wisconsinan Till, alluvium, bedrock, alluvial fan, and wetlands. The creek's drainage basin is designated as a Coldwater Fishery and a Migratory Fishery.

== Course ==
Nine Partners Creek begins in a small unnamed pond on a hill in New Milford Township. It flows east-northeast for a few tenths of a mile before passing through Hunt Lake, and then turns south. After a few tenths of a mile, the creek turns southeast for more than a mile, entering Harford Township. Here, it turns south-southeast for several tenths of a mile before beginning to flow south alongside Interstate 81, crossing Pennsylvania Route 547 and receiving the tributary Leslie Creek from the right. After a few miles, it flows south-southeast for more than a mile before turning south again. Several tenths of a mile further downstream, the creek receives the tributary Butler Creek from the left and enters Lenox Township. Here, it continues flowing south for several tenths of a mile before turning south-southeast. Several tenths of a mile further downstream, the creek crosses Pennsylvania Route 92 and reaches its confluence with Tunkhannock Creek.

Nine Partners Creek is approximately 10 miles (16 km) long. The creek joins Tunkhannock Creek 26.39 miles (42.47 km) upstream of its mouth.

=== Tributaries ===
Nine Partners Creek has two named tributaries: Butler Creek and Leslie Creek. Butler Creek joins Nine Partners Creek 1.40 miles (2.25 km) upstream of its mouth, within 1 mile (1.6 km) of Harding Corners, and drains an area of 20.8 square miles (54 km^{2}). Leslie Creek joins Nine Partners Creek 4.48 miles (7.21 km) upstream of its mouth, within 1 mile (1.6 km) of Lenox, and drains an area of 4.59 square miles (11.9 km^{2}).

== Geography and geology ==
The elevation near the mouth of Nine Partners Creek is 869 feet (265 m) above sea level. The elevation near the creek's source is 1,615 feet (492 m) above sea level.

The surficial geology inside the valley of Nine Partners Creek in its lower reaches mainly consists of alluvium and fill, although there is a small patch of alluvial fan. The sides of the valley have surficial geology containing a till known as Wisconsinan Till and bedrock consisting of sandstone and shale. Further upstream the surficial geology is similar, but with two more alluvial fan patches and a wetland patch. Along the uppermost reaches of the creek, includes Wisconsinan Till (especially at the headwaters) and alluvium, as well as small patches of alluvial fan and wetland.

Nine Partners Creek has been described as a "small creek". Some sources describe the creek as flowing into Leslie Creek, which is one of its tributaries.

== Watershed ==
The watershed of Nine Partners Creek has an area of 38.6 square miles (100 km^{2}). The mouth of the creek is in the United States Geological Survey quadrangle of Lenoxville. However, its source is in the quadrangle of Harford. The creek's mouth is located near East Lenox.

A natural lake known as Hunt Lake is located in Nine Partners Creek. It has an area of 18 acres (7.3 ha) and is located in New Milford Township. Other lakes in the creek's watershed, on tributaries of the creek, include the 35.9-acre (14.5 ha) Tyler Lake and the 42.3-acre (17.1 ha) Tingley Lake.

Interstate 81 is located in the vicinity of Nine Partners Creek. The reach of the highway running in the creek's vicinity was built in the 1960s.

== History ==
The creek is also known as Leslie Creek. This variant name appears in a 1981 map of Susquehanna County from the Pennsylvania Department of Transportation. However, in the 1960s, it was found that all locals who were asked referred to the creek as Nine Partners Creek.

Nine Partners Creek receives its name from an association of early settlers who came from Connecticut.

== Biology ==
The drainage basin of Nine Partners Creek is designated as a Coldwater Fishery and a Migratory Fishery.

In 2005, one of a number of brook trout released into Tunkhannock Creek to study trout movement made its way 7.5 miles (12.1 km) downstream to go up Nine Partners Creek as far as the tributary Butler Creek. This was the only occurrence of a trout entering a tributary stream during the study. Fishing can be done in the creek.

In the upper part of the Nine Partners Creek watershed, 65.4 percent of the watersheds have a Habitat Quality Index (the maximum probability of finding brook trout in a zero-stress situation) of at least 0.50.

== See also ==
- Partners Creek, next tributary of Tunkhannock Creek going downstream
- Bell Creek (Tunkhannock Creek), next tributary of Tunkhannock Creek going upstream
- List of rivers of Pennsylvania
