= Butler County =

Butler County is the name of eight counties in the United States:

- Butler County, Alabama
- Butler County, Iowa
- Butler County, Kansas
- Butler County, Kentucky
- Butler County, Missouri
- Butler County, Nebraska
- Butler County, Ohio
- Butler County, Pennsylvania
