= Fort Butler =

Fort Butler may refer to:

- Fort Butler (Astor, Florida)
- Fort Butler (Donaldsonville, Louisiana), listed on the NRHP in Louisiana
- Fort Butler (Murphy, North Carolina)
