= Butler Township, Pemiscot County, Missouri =

Township in Pemiscot County, Missouri, U.S.

Coordinates: 36.3639769°N 89.6243343°W

Butler Township is an inactive township in Pemiscot County, in the U.S. state of Missouri.

Butler Township has the name of F. C. Butler, a local law enforcement agent.
