= James and Clara Butler House =

- U.S. National Register of Historic Places
- Location within Georgia
- Location: 418 College St., Blakely, Georgia
- Coordinates: 31°22′45″N 84°56′27″W
- Area: less than one acre
- Built: c.1890
- Architectural style: Folk Victorian
- NRHP reference No.: 01001430
- Added to NRHP: January 11, 2002

The James and Clara Butler House, at 418 College St. in Blakely, Georgia, was built around 1890. It was listed on the National Register of Historic Places in 2002.

It is a one-story, frame, Folk Victorian-style, Georgian cottage. It has a steep side-gable roof.

It was expanded before the 1930s by the addition of a two-room ell, and further additions were made to the left rear, to the right side, and to the rear, between 1937 and 1950.

It was deemed notable as a good example of a Folk Victorian-style Georgian cottage. It was one of only two such houses identified in a survey of historic houses in Blakely. The NRHP nomination states:

The house retains its original exterior character-defining features including the Folk Victorian details of the porch with its chamfered posts, scrollwork, unusual wainscoting, and balustrade; sidelights and transom; scrolled bargeboard in the gable ends; and gable things [sic]. As defined in Georgia's Living Places: Historic Houses in Their Landscaped Settings, the house retains its Georgian cottage plan with two rooms flanking a center hall with interior chimneys between each pair of rooms. The Georgian cottage was the most popular and long-lived house type in Georgia, with the greatest concentration built between 1850 and 1890. The house also retains its interior features including original wood walls, ceilings, floors, doors, and two original mantels.
