= Roswell Butler House =

Historic house in Vermont, United States

- U.S. National Register of Historic Places
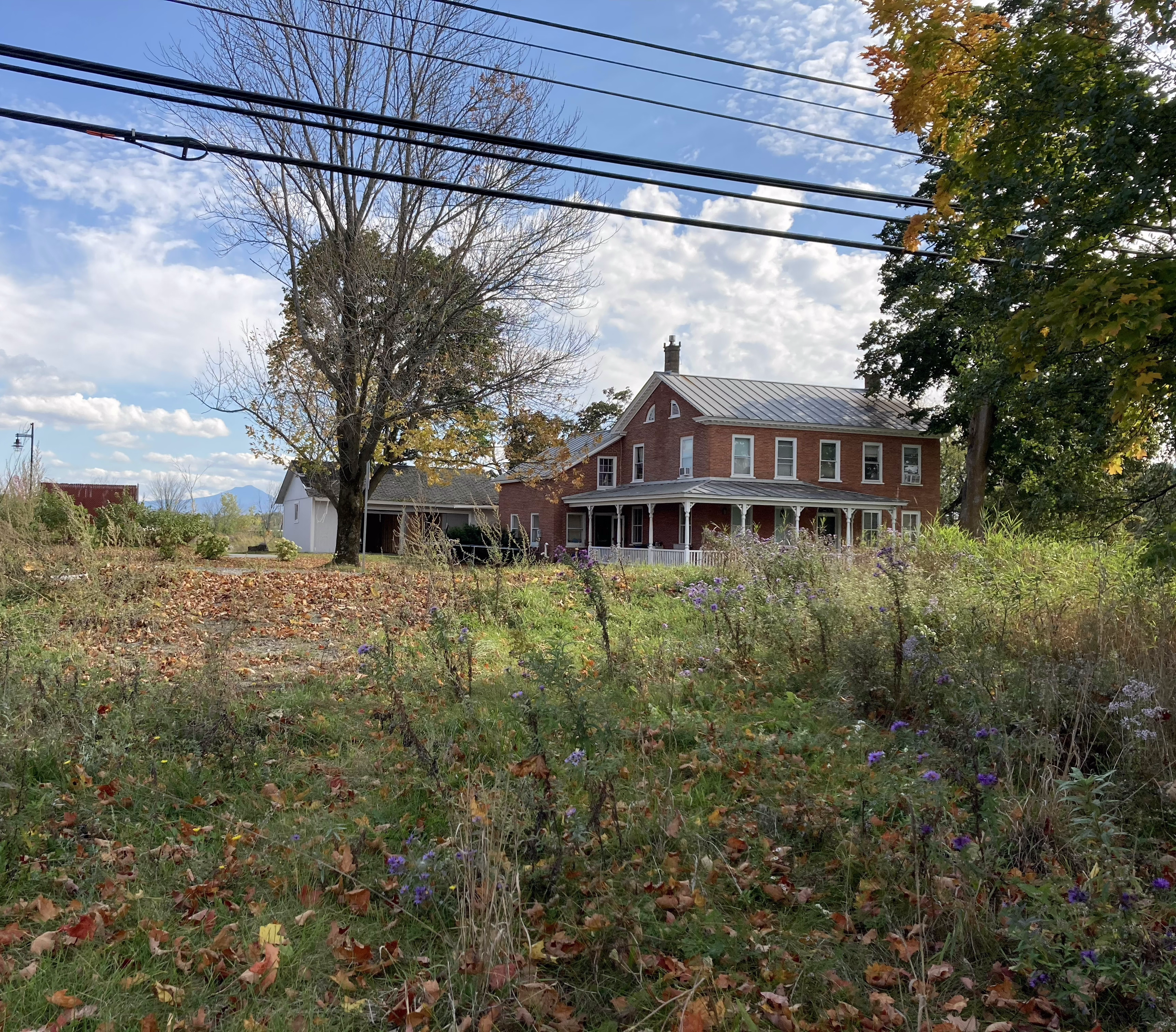

- Location within Vermont Location within the United States
- Location: Upper Main St., Essex, Vermont
- Coordinates: 44°30′34″N 73°5′5″W
- Area: less than one acre
- Built: 1822
- NRHP reference No.: 01001226
- Added to NRHP: November 08, 2001

The Roswell Butler House is a historic house on Upper Main Street in Essex, Vermont. Built about 1822 with later alterations, it is a good local example of Federal period architecture. It was built for Roswell Butler, a prominent local businessman from whom the surrounding Butler's Corner neighborhood takes its name. The house was listed on the National Register of Historic Places in 2001. It is also known as the 1820 Coffee House and the Kilmoyer House on the Essex Vermont town list of historic sites.

== Description and history ==
The Roswell Butler House stands facing Upper Main Street (Vermont Route 15), roughly midway between the town's current downtown and its historic town center. It is on the south side of the road, a short way west of its junction with Commonwealth Avenue. It is a 2 1/2-story brick building, with a gabled roof, interior end chimneys, and a stone foundation. It is five bays wide, with a late 19th-century porch extending across three bays and around to the left side. Windows have splayed stone lintels, and the roof cornice is modillioned. The main entrance is at the center of the front facade, topped by a semicircular fanlight. The porch has Queen Anne style turned posts, decorative brackets, and latticework skirting. The interior retains many original period features, including woodwork and plaster walls.

The Butler's Corner area was purchased in 1822 by Roswell Butler, who soon thereafter built this house and a store. His brother also built a house here, giving the area its name. It was until 1830 a center of civic activity, until it was supplanted by Essex Center, where the town hall, school, and churches were built. Butler was involved in a variety of businesses, lumber being the primary good, which was shipped to communities on the Hudson River via the Champlain Canal. He also established a hemp mill at Essex Junction, which was destroyed by a spring freshet in 1830.

== See also ==
- National Register of Historic Places listings in Chittenden County, Vermont
