= Butler, Delaware County, Oklahoma =

- Census-designated place
- Location within the state of Oklahoma
- Coordinates: 36°32′24″N 94°45′11″W
- Country: United States
- State: Oklahoma
- County: Delaware

Area
  - Total: 2.80 sq mi (7.25 km^{2})
  - Land: 2.80 sq mi (7.25 km^{2})
  - Water: 0 sq mi (0.00 km^{2})
- Elevation: 840 ft (260 m)

Population (2020)
  - Total: 146
  - Density: 52.2/sq mi (20.15/km^{2})
- Time zone: UTC-6 (Central (CST))
  - Summer (DST): UTC-5 (CST)
- FIPS code: 40-10460
- GNIS feature ID: 2584376

Butler is an unincorporated community and census-designated place (CDP) in Delaware County, Oklahoma, United States. The population was 117 at the 2010 census.

== Geography ==
Butler is located in northeastern Delaware County on the south side of Honey Creek where it enters the Grand Lake o' the Cherokees. It is 10 miles (16 km) north of Jay, the county seat, and 5 miles (8 km) southeast of Grove.

According to the United States Census Bureau, the Butler CDP has a total area of 2.8 square miles (7.2 km^{2}), all land.

== Demographics ==
Historical population
Census	Pop.	Note	%±
2020	146		—
U.S. Decennial Census

=== 2020 census ===
As of the 2020 census, Butler had a population of 146. The median age was 47.5 years. 24.0% of residents were under the age of 18 and 24.0% of residents were 65 years of age or older. For every 100 females there were 108.6 males, and for every 100 females age 18 and over there were 105.6 males age 18 and over.

0.0% of residents lived in urban areas, while 100.0% lived in rural areas.

There were 50 households in Butler, of which 26.0% had children under the age of 18 living in them. Of all households, 42.0% were married-couple households, 28.0% were households with a male householder and no spouse or partner present, and 18.0% were households with a female householder and no spouse or partner present. About 26.0% of all households were made up of individuals and 8.0% had someone living alone who was 65 years of age or older.

There were 61 housing units, of which 18.0% were vacant. The homeowner vacancy rate was 0.0% and the rental vacancy rate was 60.0%.

Racial composition as of the 2020 census
Race	Number	Percent
White	79	54.1%
Black or African American	0	0.0%
American Indian and Alaska Native	44	30.1%
Asian	1	0.7%
Native Hawaiian and Other Pacific Islander	0	0.0%
Some other race	0	0.0%
Two or more races	22	15.1%
Hispanic or Latino (of any race)	2	1.4%

== Education ==
It is in the Grove Public Schools school district.
