= Butler Creek (Nine Partners Creek tributary) =

Creek in Pennsylvania, USA

Physical characteristics
- Source
  - location: unnamed pond on a hill in Jackson Township, Susquehanna County, Pennsylvania
  - elevation: 1,780 feet (540 m)
- Mouth
  - location: Nine Partners Creek in Harford Township, Susquehanna County, Pennsylvania near Harding Corners
  - coordinates: 41°43′43″N 75°40′35″W
  - elevation: 892 feet (272 m)
- Length: 12 mi (19 km)
- Discharge
  - location: at Gibson
  - average: 11.9 cubic feet per second (0.34 m^{3}/s) (annual average, 1976); 17.5 cubic feet per second (0.50 m^{3}/s) (annual average, 1979)

Basin features
- Progression: Nine Partners Creek → Tunkhannock Creek → Susquehanna River → Chesapeake Bay
- Tributaries
  - right: Little Butler Creek
- Waterbodies: Butler Lake

Butler Creek is a tributary of Nine Partners Creek in Susquehanna County, Pennsylvania, in the United States. It is approximately 12 miles (19 km) long and flows through Jackson Township, Gibson Township, and Harford Township. The watershed of the creek has an area of 20.6 square miles (53 km^{2}). The creek has one named tributary, which is known as Little Butler Creek, and is not designated as an impaired waterbody. The creek's valley is a "beaded valley", at least in its upper reaches, and has thick deposits of till in its valley.

The headwaters of Butler Creek are in a lake known as Butler Lake. A number of bridges have also been constructed over the creek. Wild trout naturally reproduce within it, and forested blocks occur along the creek.

== Course ==
Butler Creek begins on an unnamed pond on a hill in Jackson Township. It flows south for a short distance, entering a wetland where it turns east for a few tenths of a mile, entering another wetland and passing through Butler Lake. From the southern end of the lake, the creek flows south-southwest for several tenths of a mile before turning west for a short distance and then turning south-southwest again. After several tenths of a mile, it crosses Pennsylvania Route 492 before continuing south-southwest. After several tenths of a mile, it turns south-southeast and then southwest for a few tenths of a mile, receiving the tributary Little Butler Creek from the right. It then turns south-southwest for several tenths of a mile, entering Gibson Township. After more than a mile, the creek turns southwest for several tenths of a mile before turning south-southwest and entering Harford Township. In this township, it flows south-southwest for a few miles before turning southeast and then south. After several tenths of a mile, the creek turns southwest for several tenths of a mile before crossing Interstate 81 and reaching its confluence with Nine Partners Creek.

Butler Creek is approximately 12 miles (19 km) long. The creek joins Nine Partners Creek 1.40 miles (2.25 km) upstream of its mouth.

=== Tributaries ===
Butler Creek has one named tributary, which is known as Little Butler Creek. Little Butler Creek joins Butler Creek 8.20 miles (13.20 km) upstream of its mouth, near Gibson, and drains an area of 1.63 square miles (4.2 km^{2}).

== Hydrology ==
Butler Creek is not designated as an impaired waterbody.

The average annual discharge of Butler Creek at Gibson between 1974 and 1979 ranged from 11.9 cubic feet per second (0.34 m^{3}/s) in 1976 to 17.5 cubic feet per second (0.50 m^{3}/s) in 1979. In 1974 and 1975, the discharges were 13.4 and 12.6 cubic feet per second (0.38 and 0.36 m^{3}/s), respectively. In 1977 and 1978, the average annual discharges were 13.9 and 17.3 cubic feet per second (0.39 and 0.49 m^{3}/s).

Between October 1973 and September 1979, the months where Butler Creek had the highest average discharge at Gibson were March and January; the discharges were 31 and 24 cubic feet per second (0.88 and 0.68 m^{3}/s), respectively. The months with the lowest average discharge were August and July, with average discharges of 2.4 and 2.3 cubic feet per second (0.068 and 0.065 m^{3}/s), respectively.

== Geography and geology ==
The elevation near the mouth of Butler Creek is 892 feet (272 m) above sea level. The elevation near the creek's source is 1,780 feet (540 m) above sea level.

The surficial geology along Butler Creek near its mouth mainly consists of alluvium, although there is one patch of alluvial fan nearby. The sides of the valley are lined with a till known as Wisconsinan Till and there are some patches of bedrock consisting of sandstone and shale on nearby hills. Further upstream, the surficial geology along the creek continues to consist mainly of alluvium, but there are several patches of Wisconsinan Ice-Contact Stratified Drift nearby, as well as one small patch of alluvial fan. Wisconsinan Till continues to line the sides of the valley and bedrock is present on nearby hills. In the upper reaches, the surficial geology along the creek mainly includes Wisconsinan Till, but there are patches of alluvial fan, alluvium, and wetlands. At the headwaters, there is Butler Lake and patches of wetlands and peat bogs.

In the Harford quadrangle, the alluvium in the valley of Butler Creek can be up to 12 feet (3.7 m) thick. The creek is separated from its tributary Little Butler Creek by two broad, low cols partially filled by till. The valley of Butler Creek in its upper reaches includes a "beaded valley" that was little affected by glacial erosion but considerably affected by glacial deposition, to the point that large amounts of glacial till partly or fully block off individual valleys. Along with Bell Creek and the West Branch Lackawanna River, the valley of Butler Creek is one of the best examples of such beaded valleys in the Thompson quadrangle.

== Watershed ==
The watershed of Butler Creek has an area of 20.8 square miles (54 km^{2}). The mouth of the creek is in the United States Geological Survey quadrangle of Lenoxville, while its source is in the quadrangle of Thompson. The creek also flows through the quadrangle of Harford. Its mouth is located within 1 mile (1.6 km) of Harding Corners.

A 24-acre (9.7 ha) lake known as Butler Lake is on Butler Creek in its upper reaches. There is a stream gage on Butler Creek at Gibson. The area of the creek's watershed at this gage is 7.38 square miles (19.1 km^{2}).

== History and recreation ==
Butler Creek was entered into the Geographic Names Information System on August 2, 1979. Its identifier in the Geographic Names Information System is 1170794.

By the 1870s, there was a village known as Burrow's Hollow in the vicinity of Butler Creek.

A steel stringer/multi-beam or girder bridge carrying T-548/Podunk Road over Butler Creek was built 3 miles (4.8 km) south of Harford in 1920 and repaired in 1982 and is 37.1 feet (11.3 m) long. Two prestressed box beam or girders bridges carrying Interstate 81 over the creek and T-582 were built in 1961 in Harford Township and are 215.9 feet (65.8 m) long. One was repaired in 1984 and the other in 2009. Another steel stringer/multi-beam or girder bridge carrying T-548/Podunk Road over the creek was built in 1968 2.1 miles (3.4 km) east of Harford and is 53.2 feet (16.2 m) long. A two-span concrete culvert bridge carrying Pennsylvania Route 547 over the creek was built in Gibson Township in 1999 and is 38.1 feet (11.6 m) long. A steel stringer/multi-beam or girder bridge carrying T-582/Penny Hill Road over the creek 3 miles (4.8 km) southeast of Harford was built in 2009 and is 50.9 feet (15.5 m) long.

There are several boat docks on Butler Lake, a lake on Butler Creek. The Susquehanna County Natural Areas Inventory has recommended removing these and replacing them with a single boat launch in the lake's northeastern corner. Although there is recreational development pressure, the Susquehanna County Natural Areas Inventory also opposed flooding the bog with a dam.

== Biology ==
Wild trout naturally reproduce in Butler Creek from its headwaters down to an unnamed tributary unofficially known as Gibson Creek, a distance of 6.07 miles (9.77 km). The creek serves as a transition between cold headwater streams and larger, warmer creeks. Brook trout were observed in the creek in the 1930s.

Butler Lake, a lake on Butler Creek, is listed on the Susquehanna County Natural Areas Inventory. The lake is a bog habitat, though there is some residential development along its shoreline. There is a large floating bog mat in the southern part of the lake.

One of the largest forested blocks in Harford Township is situated along Butler Creek and its tributaries. It forms a "critical starting point" for riparian buffer conservation there. A block of forested land is also present along the creek in Gibson Township.

== See also ==
- Leslie Creek (Nine Partners Creek), next tributary of Nine Partners Creek going upstream
- List of rivers of Pennsylvania
