= Butlers Chocolates =

Irish confectioner

Butlers Chocolate
- Company type: Private
- Industry: Confectionary
- Founded: 1932
- Headquarters: Dublin, Ireland
- Key people: Marion Bailey-Butler, founder
- Website: butlerschocolates.com/en

Butlers Chocolates is an Irish manufacturer of luxury chocolate products, based in North Dublin. Founded by Marion Bailey-Butler in 1932, the company produces a wide range of confectionery products including chocolate bars, truffles, fudge, toffee, chocolate eggs and seasonal novelties. The company has also created a chain of Butlers Chocolate Cafés.

Butlers chocolates were founded in 1932 by Ms Bailey-Butler. Based in Dublin's Lad Lane, Bailey-Butler developed a range of handmade chocolates.

In 1959, the company was purchased by Seamus Sorensen, and in 1984, the Butlers Irish Chocolates brand was born. The company was named in memory of its founder, Marion Bailey-Butler.

Five years later, in 1989, Butlers Chocolates' first retail outlet opened on Grafton Street in Dublin City Centre. Since then, retail outlets have opened all over Ireland. There were also five stores in New Zealand.

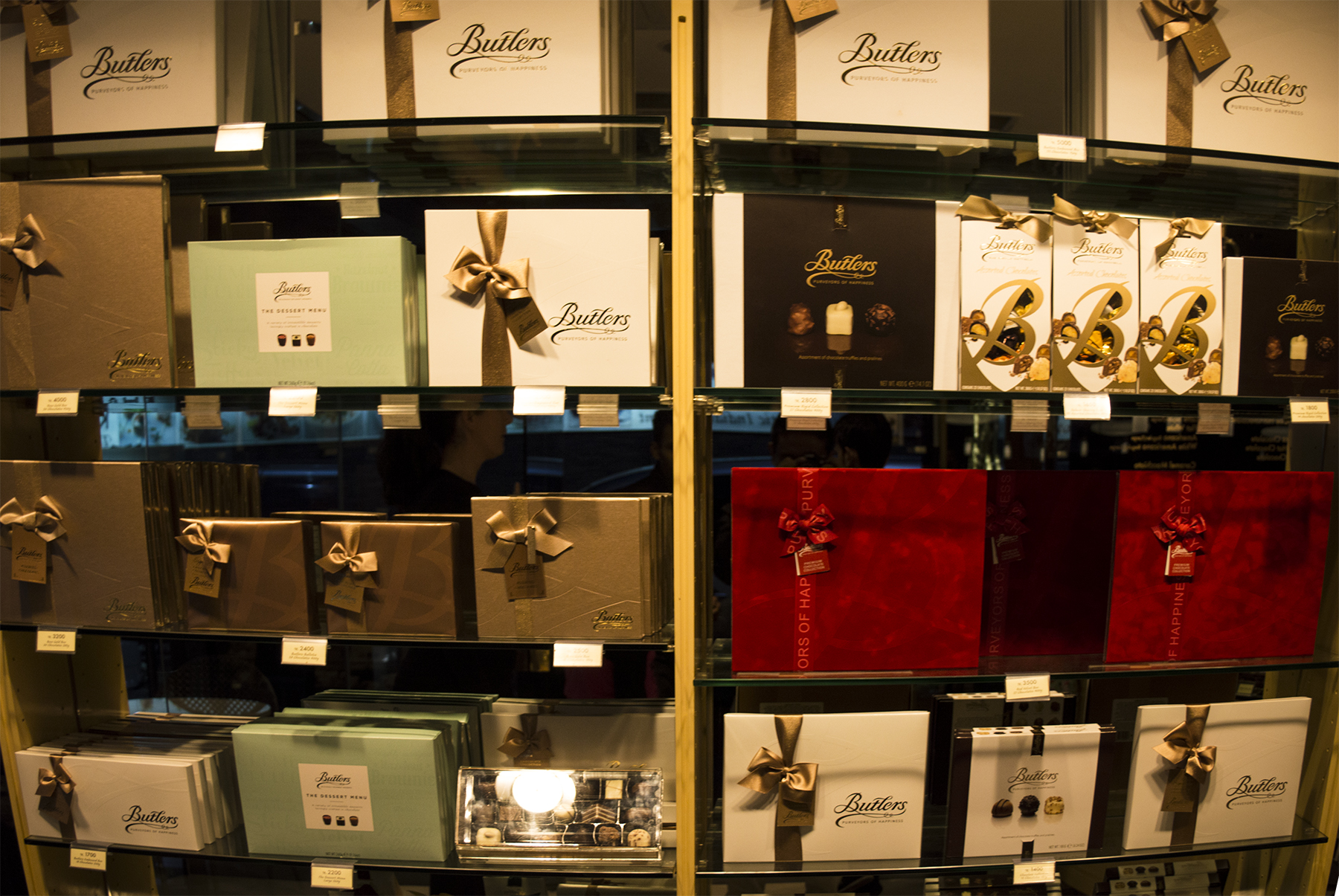
Selection of Butlers products

The first Butlers Chocolate Café opened on Wicklow Street, Dublin in 1998 and since then, they have opened a further 39 Butlers Chocolate Cafés – in Dublin, Cork, Galway, Limerick, Naas, Kildare & Bray (Ireland), Karachi, Lahore & Islamabad (Pakistan) and Abu Dhabi (United Arab Emirates).

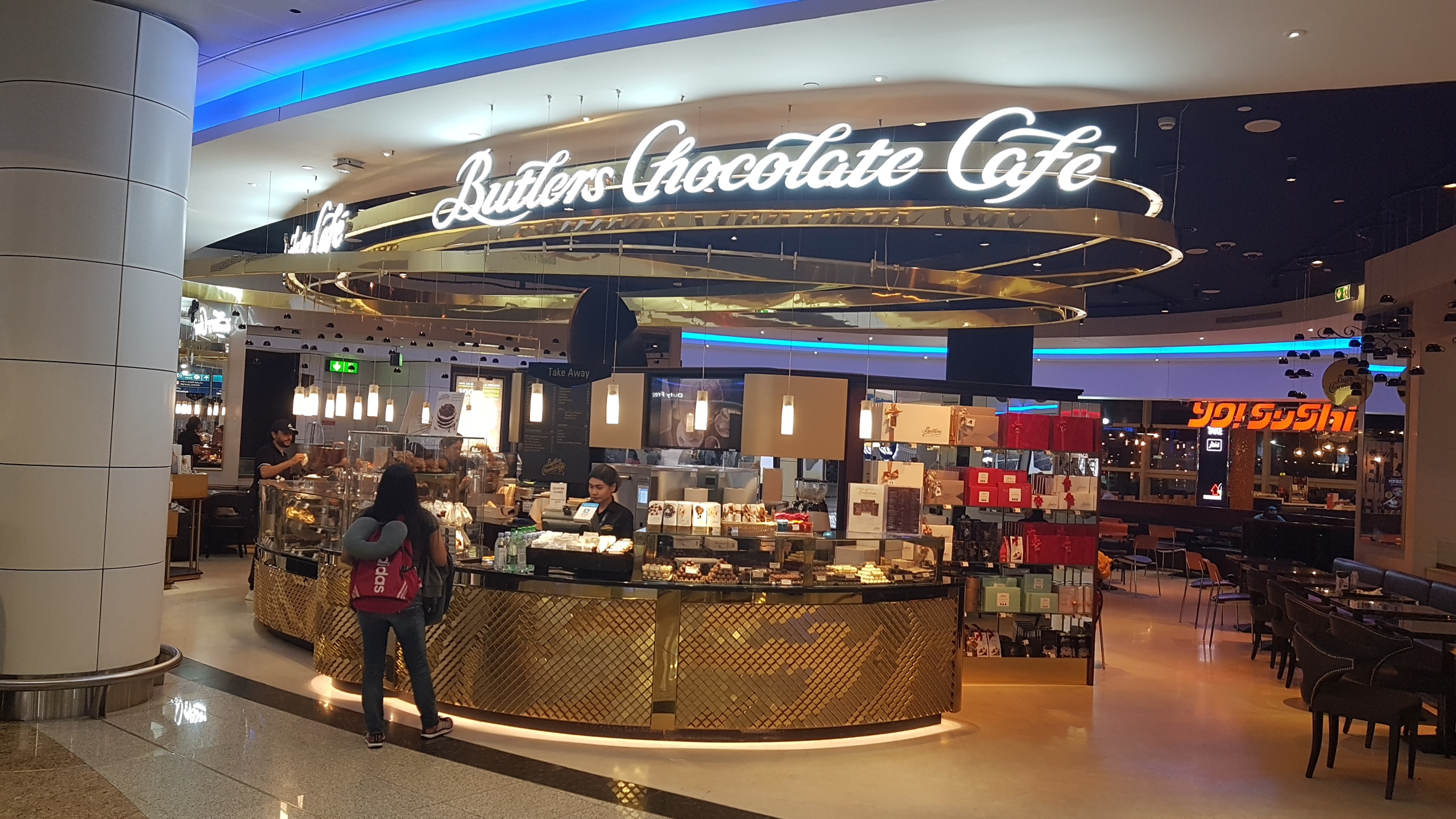
Butlers Chocolate Café, Dubai Airport

Butlers has also expanded into the Great Britain with the opening of a café in Westfield, London, and their chocolates are now widely available in most major airports throughout the UK and at Waitrose stores.

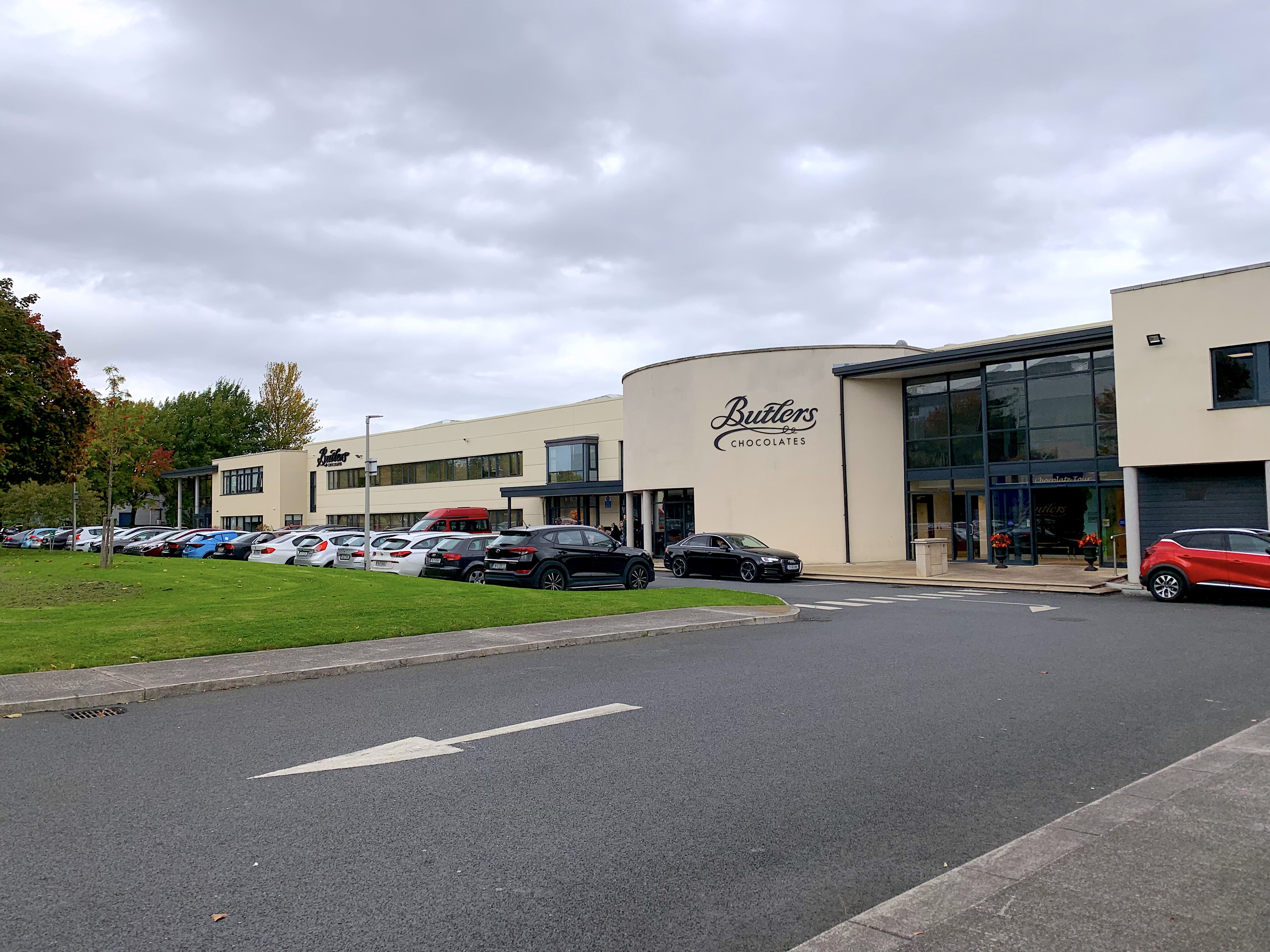
The factory and main office of Butlers Chocolates, featuring a Butlers Chocolate Café.

In 2003, Butlers Chocolates relocated to Clonshaugh, Dublin 17.

Butlers plans to expand internationally, using a franchise model outside of Ireland and Great Britain.

In July 2025, the parent company of the New Zealand stores, Chocolate Cafes (New Zealand), went into liquidation, resulting in a nationwide closure of all stores. The business had operated chocolate cafés for 18 years across Auckland and Wellington but had suffered from increased raw material costs and declining sales.
