= Butler House (Stowe, Vermont) =

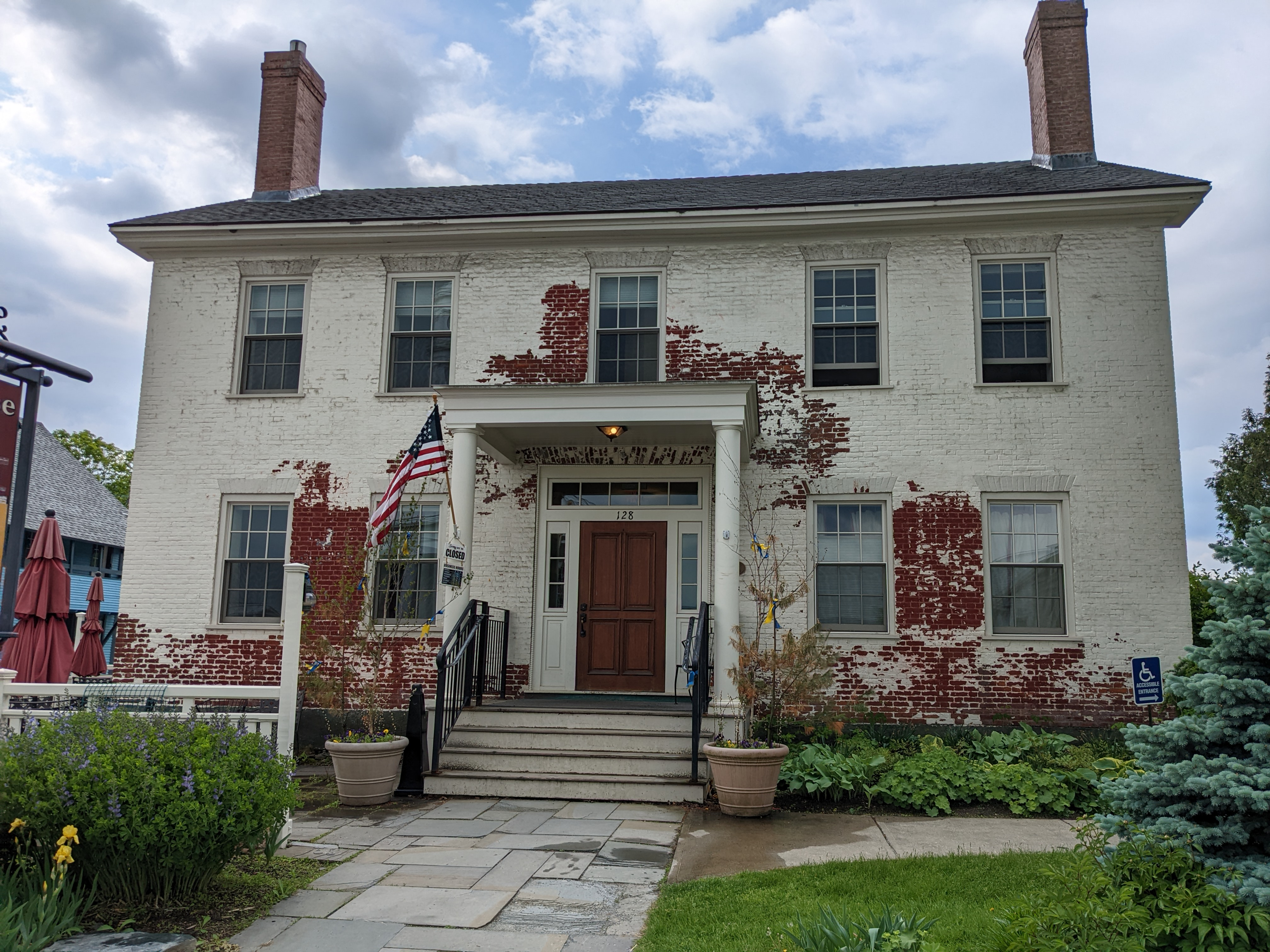
- The building in 2022
- Interactive map of the Butler House area
- Former names: Swisspot Building

General information
- Location: Stowe, Vermont, U.S., 128 Main Street
- Coordinates: 44.465086361°N 72.6849048°W
- Completed: 1835 (191 years ago)
- Owner: Paul and Laura Biron (since 2009)

Technical details
- Floor count: 3

Butler House is an inn and restaurant in the Stowe Village Historic District in Vermont, United States. Located at 128 Main Street (Vermont Route 100), at the intersection with School Street, the building dates to 1835. It stands directly opposite Stowe Community Church.

The building was formerly the home of Orion W. Butler (1803–1883), one of Stowe's first attorneys. It has also been a tavern and a post office.

Current owners Paul and Laura Biron purchased the property in 2009, shortly after its thirty-year stint as the Swisspot Restaurant. They renovated the building in line with National Historic Trust guidelines. Preceding the Butler House name change, the couple also owned the previous two businesses at the location: a restaurant named Mi Casa, and its predecessor, Frida's Taqueria.

In addition to guest rooms, a restaurant, named Butler's Pantry, serves breakfast. The restaurant won the Most Popular Breakfast award from Insider.com in 2018 and the Best Pancakes in Vermont award from People in 2020.

In the mid-19th century, Butler House was one of several buildings used to determine the height of Mount Washington:

A line of levels gave the height of the Butler House in Stowe to be 851.70. A triangulation from a base measured near this point gave the height of No. 18 to be 4,387.25 and of No. 19 4,061.46

— Edward Charles Pickering, Accurate Mountain Heights
