= Butler-Wallin House =

- U.S. National Register of Historic Places
- The Butler-Wallin House in 2026

- Location within Utah Location within the United States
- Location: 1045 E 4500 S, Millcreek, Utah, in Salt Lake County, Utah
- Coordinates: 40.674558°N 111.861699°W
- Area: 0.4 acres (0.16 ha)
- Built: 1928
- Architect: Butler, Robert W.
- Architectural style: Tudor Revival, Colonial Revival
- NRHP reference No.: 05000593
- Added to NRHP: June 10, 2005

The Butler-Wallin House, at 1045 E 4500 S, Millcreek, Utah, in Salt Lake County, Utah, was built in 1928–29. It was listed on the National Register of Historic Places in 2005.

The Butler-Wallin House, built in 1928-1929, is a one-and-a-half-story Period Revival-style residence. The house is significant under Criteria A for its association with the agricultural and suburban development of central Salt Lake County. The Butler-Wallin House was originally built as the showpiece of a 35-acre farm. The house and farm had several owners during the historic period, and each had different agricultural use for the property. The farm acreage land was sold for residential development between the 1950s and 1980s, but the house remains a distinctive reminder of the neighborhood's agricultural heritage. The Butler-Wallin House is a rare example of a farmhouse that represents a subset of second-generation Salt Lake County residents, the "gentlemen" farmers. Prosperous businessmen, who like Robert Butler and Alvin G. Wallin, kept their in-town jobs while maintaining suburban farms for hobby, experimentation, and educational purposes. The Butler-Wallin House is also significant under Criterion C as an architectural landmark in the area. The Butler-Wallin House was designed by the first owner, Robert W. Butler, whose avocation was architecture. The design of the house was derived from published plans for farmhouses, but adapted by Butler to produce a period revival hybrid of the English Tudor and Colonial Revival styles. It is the only substantial period revival-style frame house in the area. Thehome's beautiful architecture and lush landscaping made it a popular venue for weddings, receptions, and other social events during the historic period. The Butler-Wallin House and landscape contribute to the historic resources of its Salt Lake County neighborhood.

It has also been known as Butler Farm, as Wallin Farm, as Jensen Dairy.

A three-space garage is a second contributing building on the property.

It is no longer a residence, has been used as a business location since the 1980s.

It is located on the northeast corner of E 4500 S and S 1025 E. in what is now Millcreek, Utah, which was incorporated in 2016.
