= Butlers (company) =

German interior decoration retail chain

Butlers GmbH & Co. KG
- Genre: Retail
- Founded: Neuss, Germany (1999)
- Headquarters: Cologne, Germany
- Number of locations: c. 160
- Area served: Europe
- Key people: Wilhelm Josten, André Martens
- Products: accessories, decoration, furniture, gifts
- Number of employees: around 1,200
- Website: butlers.com

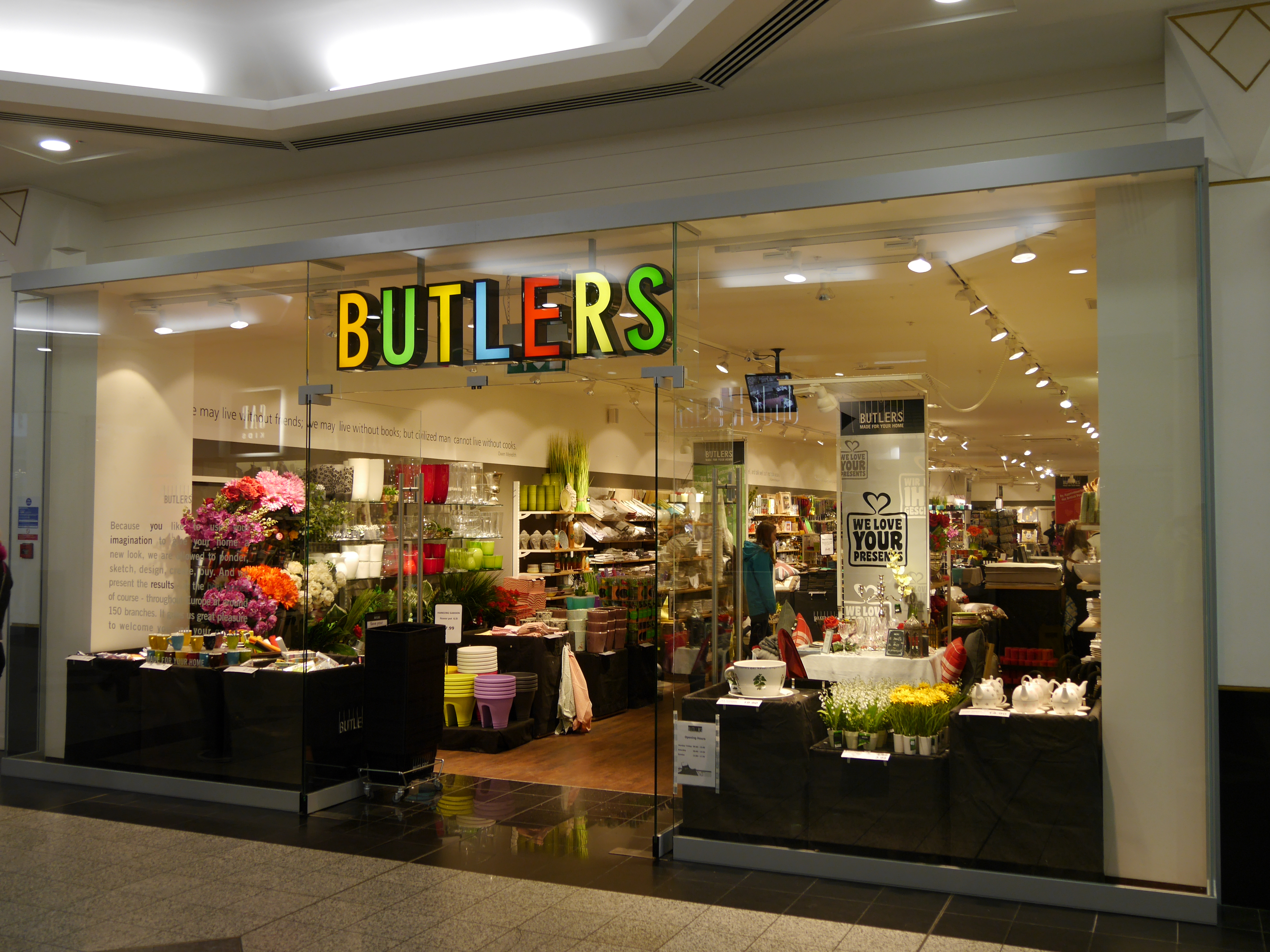
Butlers, Putney Exchange, London (now closed)

Butlers GmbH & Co KG is a German lifestyle retail chain that sells home accessories, decoration, furniture, and gifts in more than 160 stores throughout Europe. The Cologne-based company also operates an online shop for Austria, Great Britain, Germany, Switzerland, and Spain, utilizing the tag line “made for your home” and presenting decoration ideas through themed tables.

== History ==
Butlers originated from the family-run company "Wilhelm Josten Söhne", founded in 1829 in Neuss, Germany, which operated the department store "Josten", known for kitchenware and household appliances. In 1999, the brothers Wilhelm and Paul Josten, together with Frank Holzapfel, opened the first Butlers store in Cologne.

In 2005, Butlers expanded abroad with its subsidiaries "Butlers Trading Ltd." and "Butlers Handel GmbH". The first branches outside of Germany were established in London, Zurich, and Vienna. While stores in Germany, Austria, Switzerland, Spain, and Great Britain are managed directly by Butlers, franchise partners operate shops in Hungary, Ukraine, Greece, Croatia, Malta, Luxembourg, and the Czech Republic.

In cooperation with the German start-up Stickvogel, Butlers introduced in 2011 the service "Made by you", allowing customers to individualize products via an online configurator through embroidering and engraving, or to print pictures on canvas.

In 2004, Butlers won a German Retail Association award. The company was a two-time finalist (2005 and 2012) in the contest Ernst & Young Entrepreneur of the Year Award. Furthermore, Butlers won the German eCommerce Awards 2012 ("Deutscher Online-Handels-Award") and the NEOCOM Congress 2013 ("Versender des Jahres").

== Assortment ==
The assortment includes kitchenware, household appliancess, furniture, table decorations, home accessories, and textiles.
