= Butler group =

In mathematics, a Butler group is a group that is the image of a completely decomposable abelian group of finite rank. They were introduced by M. C. R. Butler (1965).
