= Butler Creek (White River tributary) =

Location
- Country: United States
- States: Arkansas, Missouri

Butler Creek is a stream in the U.S. states of Arkansas and Missouri. It is a tributary of the White River.

The stream headwaters are in Barry County, Missouri at 36°31′26″N 93°56′18″W and its confluence with the White River in Carroll County, Arkansas is at 36°28′15″N 93°46′31″W. The stream source is southeast of Seligman and it flows east to northeast for about 3.5 miles then turns southeast for about three miles to enter Arkansas north of Busch. East of Busch, the stream crosses under Arkansas Route 187. The stream runs parallel to that road for about 2.5 miles to its confluence with the White River just upstream from Beaver.

Butler Creek was named after the local Butler family.

== See also ==
- List of rivers of Arkansas
- List of rivers of Missouri
