= Butler Canyon =

Landform in Apache County, Arizona

Coordinates: 34°00′28″N 109°26′52″W

Butler Canyon is a valley in Apache County in the U.S. state of Arizona.

Butler Canyon has the name of Jacob Noah Butler, a Mormon pioneer.
