= Lake Butler =

Lake Butler may refer to:

- Lake Butler, Union County, Florida, a census-designated place
- Lake Butler, Orange County, Florida, a census-designated place
- Lake Butler Woman's Club, a building in Lake Butler, Union County, Florida
- Lake Butler (Polk County, Florida), a lake in Haines City, Florida
