= Butler Township =

Butler Township may refer to:

== Arkansas ==
- Butler Township, Lonoke County, Arkansas, in Lonoke County, Arkansas
- Butler Township, Randolph County, Arkansas, in Randolph County, Arkansas

== Illinois ==
- Butler Township, Vermilion County, Illinois

== Indiana ==
- Butler Township, DeKalb County, Indiana
- Butler Township, Franklin County, Indiana
- Butler Township, Miami County, Indiana

== Iowa ==
- Butler Township, Butler County, Iowa
- Butler Township, Calhoun County, Iowa
- Butler Township, Jackson County, Iowa
- Butler Township, Scott County, Iowa

== Michigan ==
- Butler Township, Branch County, Michigan

== Minnesota ==
- Butler Township, Otter Tail County, Minnesota

== Missouri ==
- Butler Township, Harrison County, Missouri
- Butler Township, Pemiscot County, Missouri
- Butler Township, St. Clair County, Missouri

== Nebraska ==
- Butler Township, Platte County, Nebraska

== Ohio ==
- Butler Township, Columbiana County, Ohio
- Butler Township, Darke County, Ohio
- Butler Township, Knox County, Ohio
- Butler Township, Mercer County, Ohio
- Butler Township, Montgomery County, Ohio
- Butler Township, Richland County, Ohio

== Pennsylvania ==
- Butler Township, Adams County, Pennsylvania
- Butler Township, Butler County, Pennsylvania
- Butler Township, Luzerne County, Pennsylvania
- Butler Township, Schuylkill County, Pennsylvania

== South Dakota ==
- Butler Township, Day County, South Dakota, in Day County, South Dakota
- Butler Township, Sanborn County, South Dakota, in Sanborn County, South Dakota
