= Butler (given name) =

Butler is a masculine given name which is borne by:

- Butler Ames (1871–1954), American politician, engineer, soldier and businessman
- Butler B'ynote' (born 1972), American football player
- Butler Derrick (1936–2014), U.S. Representative from South Carolina
- Butler B. Hare (1875–1967), U.S. Representative from South Carolina
- Butler Lampson (born 1943), American computer scientist
- Butler D. Shaffer (1935–2019), American author, law professor and speaker
