= Emmett Butler House =

Historic house in Hibbing, Minnesota

- U.S. National Register of Historic Places
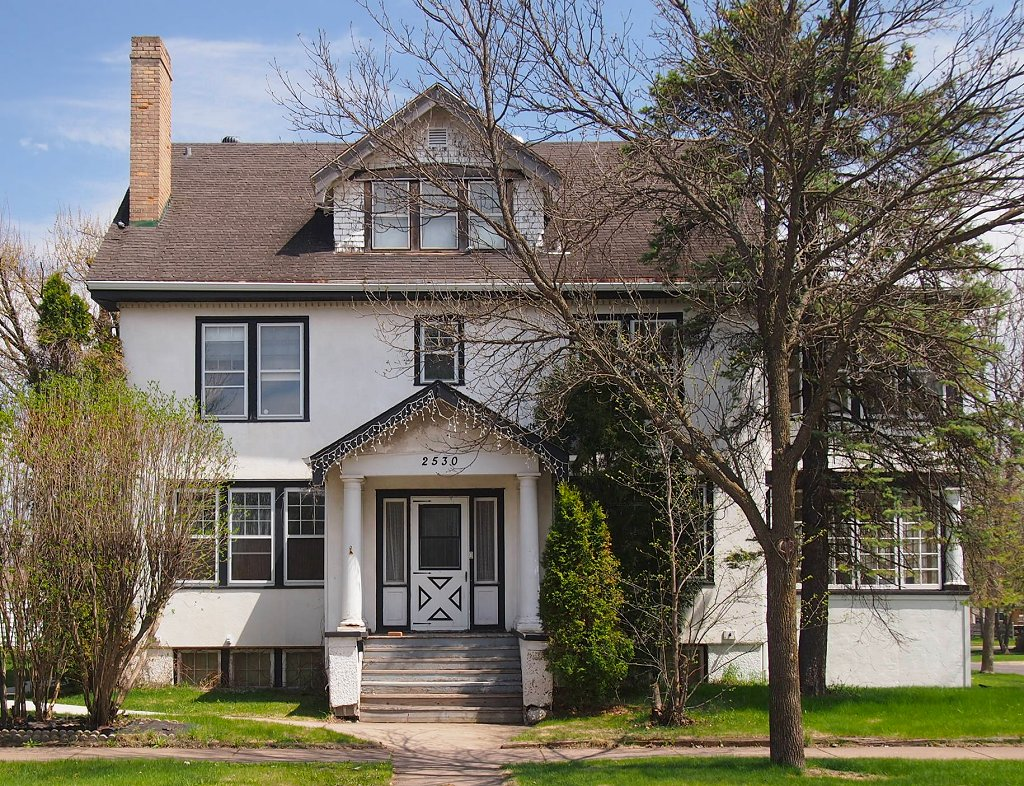
- The Emmett Butler House from the west

- Location within Minnesota Location within the United States
- Interactive map showing the location of Emmett Butler House
- Location: 2530 3rd Avenue W., Hibbing, Minnesota
- Coordinates: 47°25′14″N 92°56′39″W
- Area: Less than one acre
- Built: 1916
- Built by: Butler Brothers Construction Company
- Architectural style: Colonial Revival
- NRHP reference No.: 80004349
- Added to NRHP: December 4, 1980

The Emmett Butler House is a historic house in Hibbing, Minnesota, United States. It was built in a simplified Colonial Revival mode in 1916 for Emmett Butler, a local leader and an executive in Minnesota's influential Butler Brothers Construction Company. The house was listed on the National Register of Historic Places in 1980 for its local significance in the themes of architecture and industry. It was nominated as an example of the Colonial Revival houses built in Minnesota in the early 20th century and for its associations with Butler.

Butler Brothers Construction Company was responsible for many innovative mine structures on the Iron Range, and served as the contractor on numerous buildings including the Minnesota State Capitol. Emmett Butler was the youngest male in a family of nine children. In his career with the company founded by his older brothers, he served as manager of their Mesabi Range mining operations, then general manager from 1927 to 1936, and ultimately president. When the city of Hibbing relocated to allow the Hull–Rust–Mahoning Open Pit Iron Mine to expand, Butler Brothers was closely involved not only in the frenzy of new construction but also in the politics of the deal, much of which was conducted in this house.

== See also ==
- National Register of Historic Places listings in St. Louis County, Minnesota
