= Butler Passage =

Butler Passage (64°58′S 63°44′W) is a passage between the Wauwermans Islands and the Puzzle Islands, connecting Peltier Channel and Lemaire Channel, off the west coast of Graham Land. The route was probably first used by the French Antarctic Expedition under Jean-Baptiste Charcot, 1903–05 and 1908–10, on their trips between Port Lockroy and Booth Island. It was named by the UK Antarctic Place-Names Committee in 1959 for Captain Adrian R.L. Butler, Royal Navy, captain of the British naval guardship HMS Protector which was in this area in 1957–58 and 1958–59.

Hazard Rock is a small isolated rock lying on the east side of the Butler Passage.
