= Camp Misery =

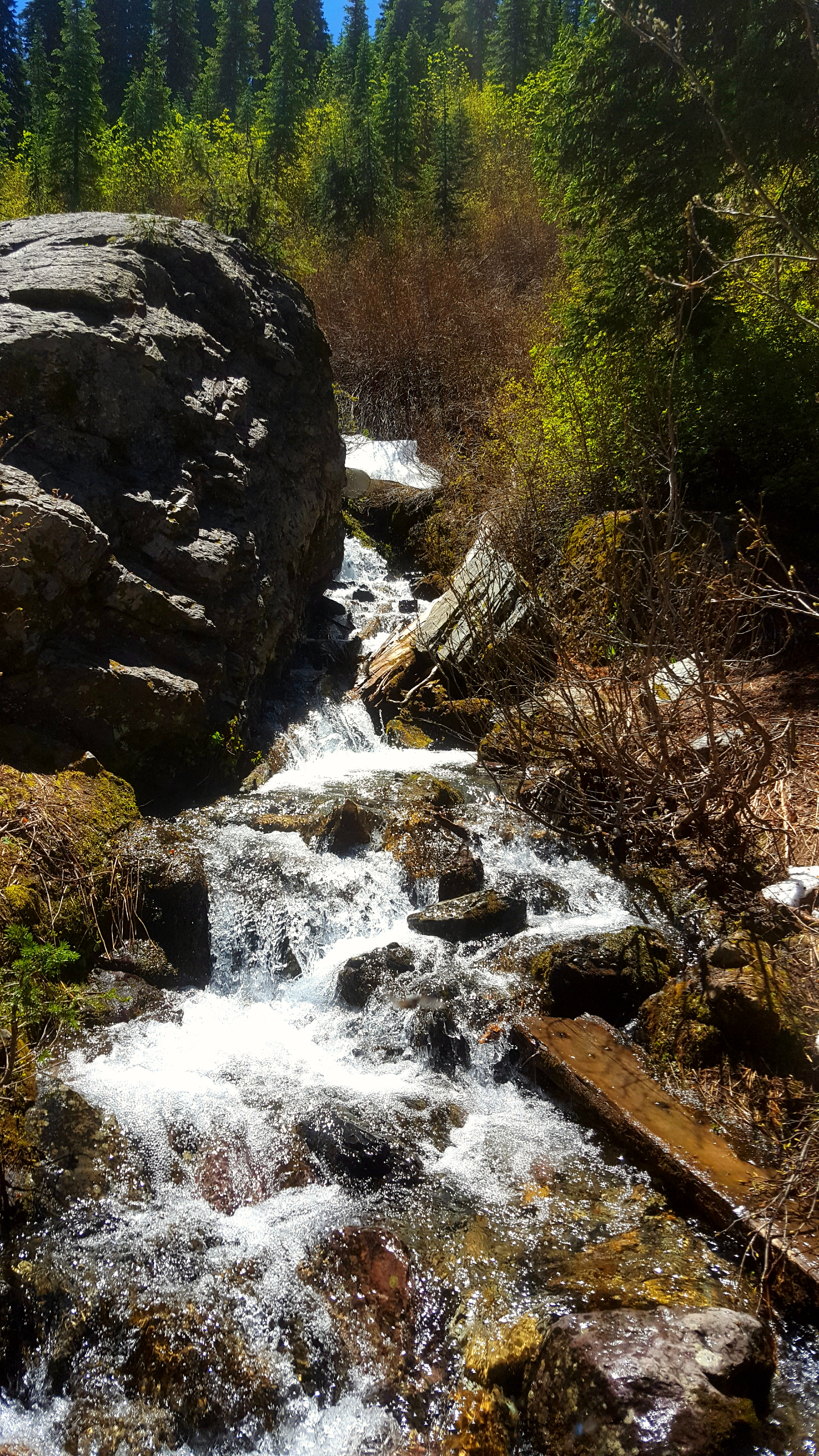
Spring runoff in the stream just south of Camp Misery, Jewel Basin

Camp Misery, located off the bank of the Rappahannock River, was a Union Army camp established in 1861. It was originally known as Camp Butler, but earned the name Camp Misery because of the horrific winter in 1862 that the soldiers experienced.

== Winter 1862 ==
The Winter of 1862 proved to be one of the harshest winters encountered during the Civil War. Camp Butler was plagued pneumonia, cholera, smallpox, dysentery, malaria and other diseases exacerbated by close contact, poor nutrition, and inadequate clothing and housing. Camp Butler also held prisoners, and, due to the poor health conditions, over 148 prisoners died within two and a half weeks.

The mortality at Camp Butler averaged around 3 to 4 soldiers per day, with the death toll reaching as high as 15 men on some days. According to records kept by a Dr. Reece, a physician in the camp, by June 1862, 336 soldiers had been hospitalized. Because of the high mortality and harsh weather conditions recorded in this particular camp, Camp Butler was dubbed "Camp Misery" by Civil War soldiers and historians.

== Excavation ==
Since 2008, Virginia's Department of Historic Resources has conducted excavations in hopes of learning more about the condition of life in Camp Butler. However, may be brought to a halt by the planned 2017 construction of a new high school. James Madison University and the Stafford County School System have begun to excavate a street located in Camp Butler looking for clues to Civil War life.
