= Butler, Clark County, Wisconsin =

Butler, Wisconsin
- Town
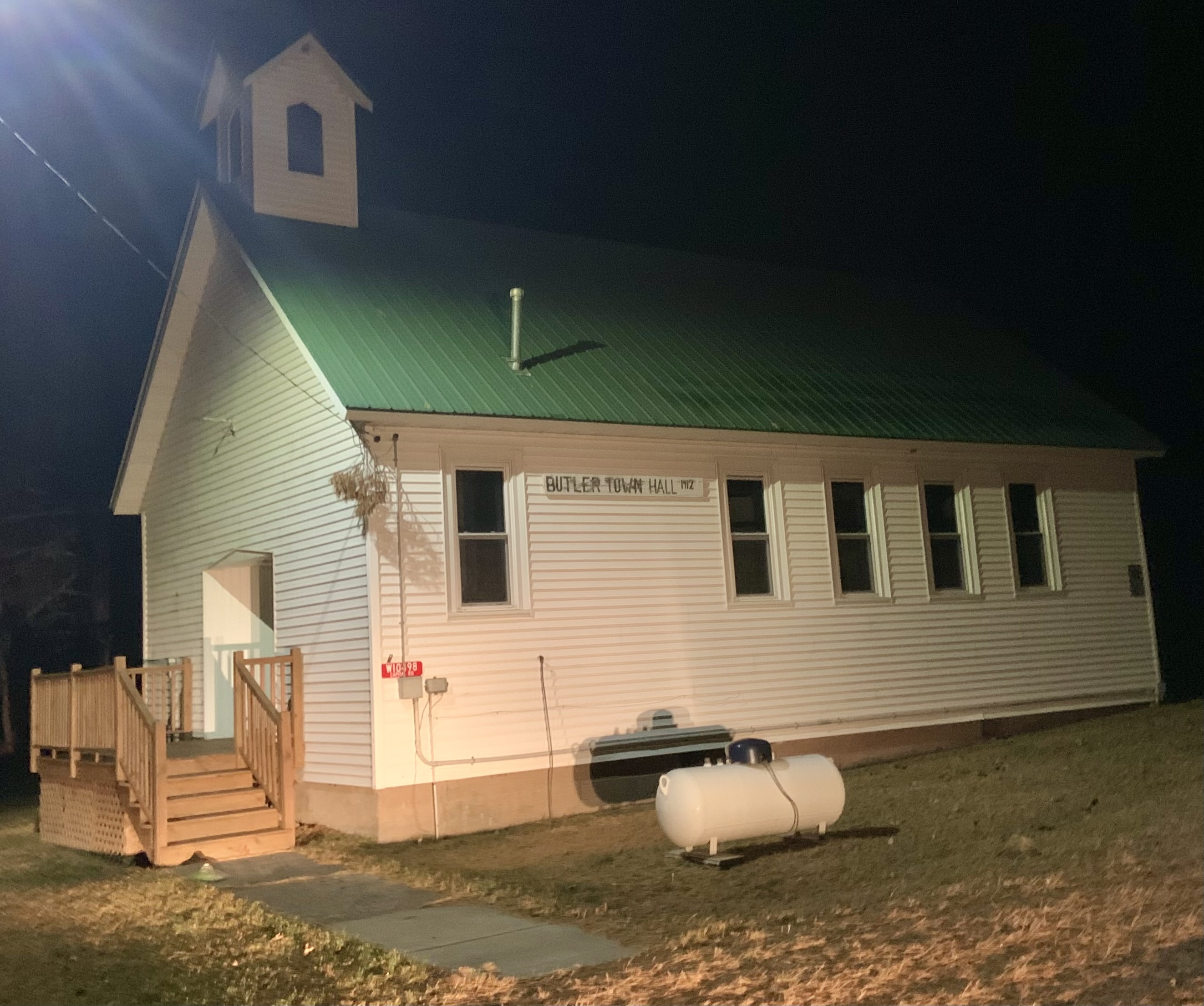
- Town hall

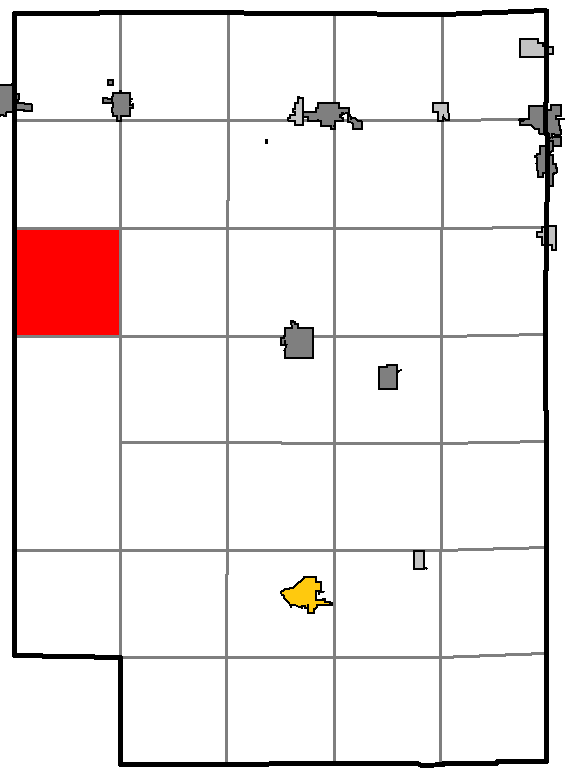
- Location of Butler, Clark County

- Location of Clark County, Wisconsin
- Coordinates: 44°48′34″N 90°52′44″W
- Country: United States
- State: Wisconsin
- County: Clark

Area
  - Total: 36.0 sq mi (93.2 km^{2})
  - Land: 35.8 sq mi (92.6 km^{2})
  - Water: 0.23 sq mi (0.6 km^{2})
- Elevation: 1,047 ft (319 m)

Population (2020)
  - Total: 112
  - Density: 3.13/sq mi (1.21/km^{2})
- Time zone: UTC-6 (Central (CST))
  - Summer (DST): UTC-5 (CDT)
- Area codes: 715 & 534
- FIPS code: 55-11425
- GNIS feature ID: 1582893

Butler is a town in Clark County in the U.S. state of Wisconsin. The population was 112 at the 2020 census.

== Geography ==
Butler is located along the western border of Clark County, adjoining Eau Claire County. According to the United States Census Bureau, the town has a total area of 36.0 square miles (93.2 km^{2}), of which 35.8 square miles (92.6 km^{2}) is land and 0.2 square miles (0.6 km^{2}), or 0.64%, is water.

== Demographics ==
As of the census of 2000, there were 88 people, 32 households, and 26 families residing in the town. The population density was 2.4 people per square mile (0.9/km^{2}). There were 49 housing units at an average density of 1.4 per square mile (0.5/km^{2}). The racial makeup of the town was 100.00% White.

There were 32 households, out of which 34.4% had children under the age of 18 living with them, 75.0% were married couples living together, 3.1% had a female householder with no husband present, and 18.8% were non-families. 15.6% of all households were made up of individuals, and 9.4% had someone living alone who was 65 years of age or older. The average household size was 2.75 and the average family size was 3.08.

In the town, the population was spread out, with 20.5% under the age of 18, 10.2% from 18 to 24, 28.4% from 25 to 44, 26.1% from 45 to 64, and 14.8% who were 65 years of age or older. The median age was 42 years. For every 100 females, there were 95.6 males. For every 100 females age 18 and over, there were 112.1 males.

The median income for a household in the town was $21,250, and the median income for a family was $51,250. Males had a median income of $36,250 versus $26,875 for females. The per capita income for the town was $23,874. There were no families and 11.1% of the population living below the poverty line, including no under eighteens and 25.0% of those over 64.
