= Charles Butler House (Franklin, Ohio) =

Historic house in Ohio, United States

- U.S. National Register of Historic Places
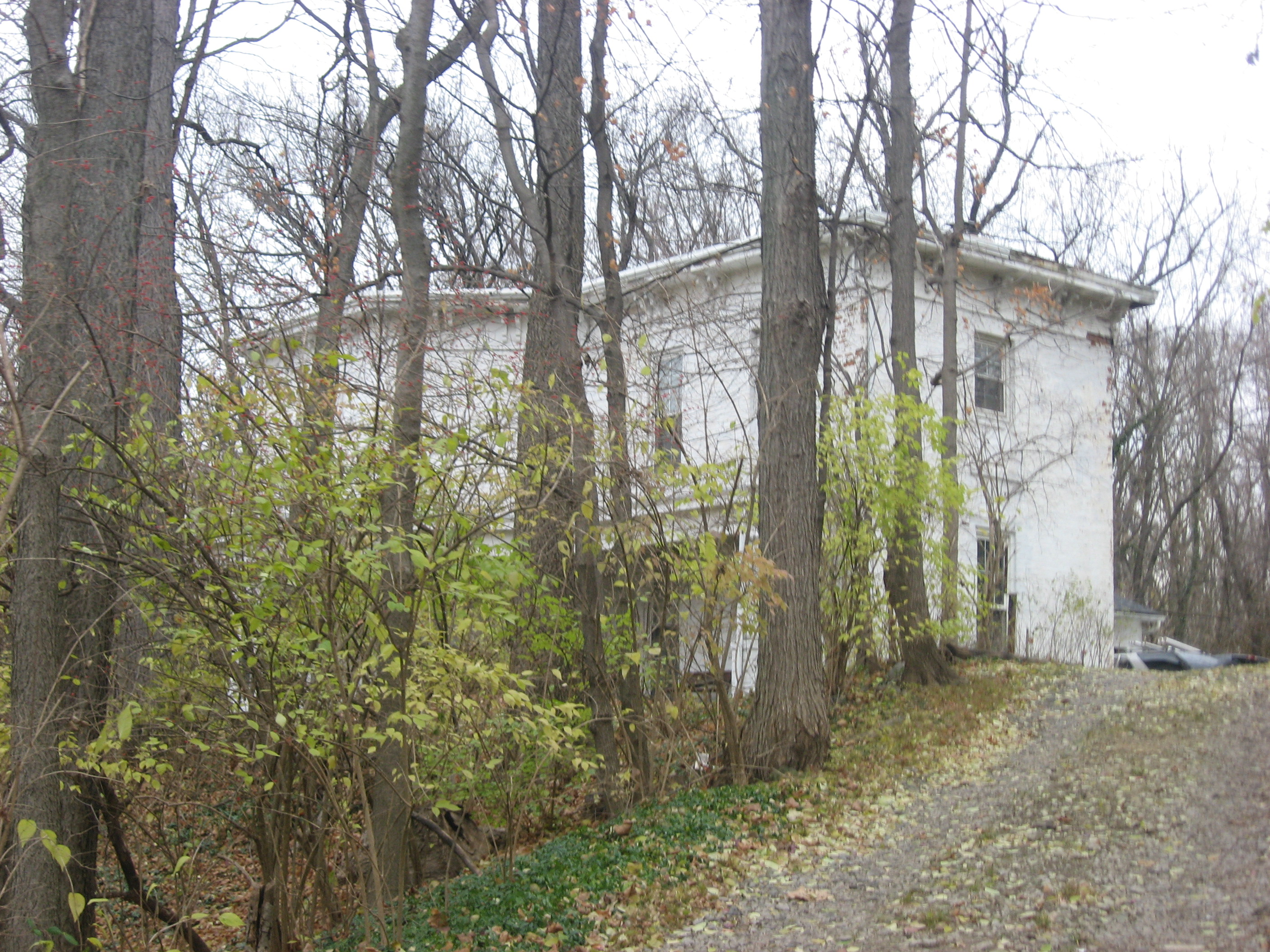
- Streetside view

- Location within Ohio Location within the United States
- Location: 13 E. Jackson St., Franklin, Ohio
- Coordinates: 39°33′52″N 84°18′0″W
- Area: 2.8 acres (1.1 ha)
- Built: 1860
- Architectural style: Octagon Mode
- NRHP reference No.: 82003664
- Added to NRHP: April 29, 1982

The Charles Butler House is a historic octagon house in the city of Franklin, Ohio, United States. Constructed during the middle of the nineteenth century, it was originally home to one of the city's most prominent men, and it has been named a historic site due to its unusual design.

In its earliest years, the city of Franklin was heavily influenced by the Schenck family, who sponsored much of its early development. A member of a later generation of the family, John N. Schenck, arranged for the construction of the present house in 1860. At the time, Orson Squire Fowler's ideal of the octagon house was at the height of its popularity, and Schenck's use of the style demonstrates his wealth at the time. Rather than living in it, Schenck gave it to his daughter and son-in-law, Charles Butler, who occupied a leading place in Franklin's governmental and commercial circles.

Built of brick, the Butler House is covered with a metal roof. The architecture includes numerous distinctive details, including the four-over-four windows placed in pairs, the wooden cornice with brackets, and the molding around the lintels. Because the house sits atop a small hill, a person inside is able to view a panorama of the city as well as the Great Miami River.

In 1982, the Butler House was listed on the National Register of Historic Places, qualifying because of its distinctive architecture; it is one of four National Register-listed locations in the city, along with the prehistoric Hill-Kinder Mound, the Mackinaw Historic District, and the Old Log Post Office. Significant to its designation was its rarity; it is one of two octagon houses in Franklin, but only one other such house remains anywhere else in southwestern Ohio, although the Goldsmith Coffeen House in Lebanon is built as a hexagon.
