= Butler station (MBTA) =

Light rail station in Boston

Butler
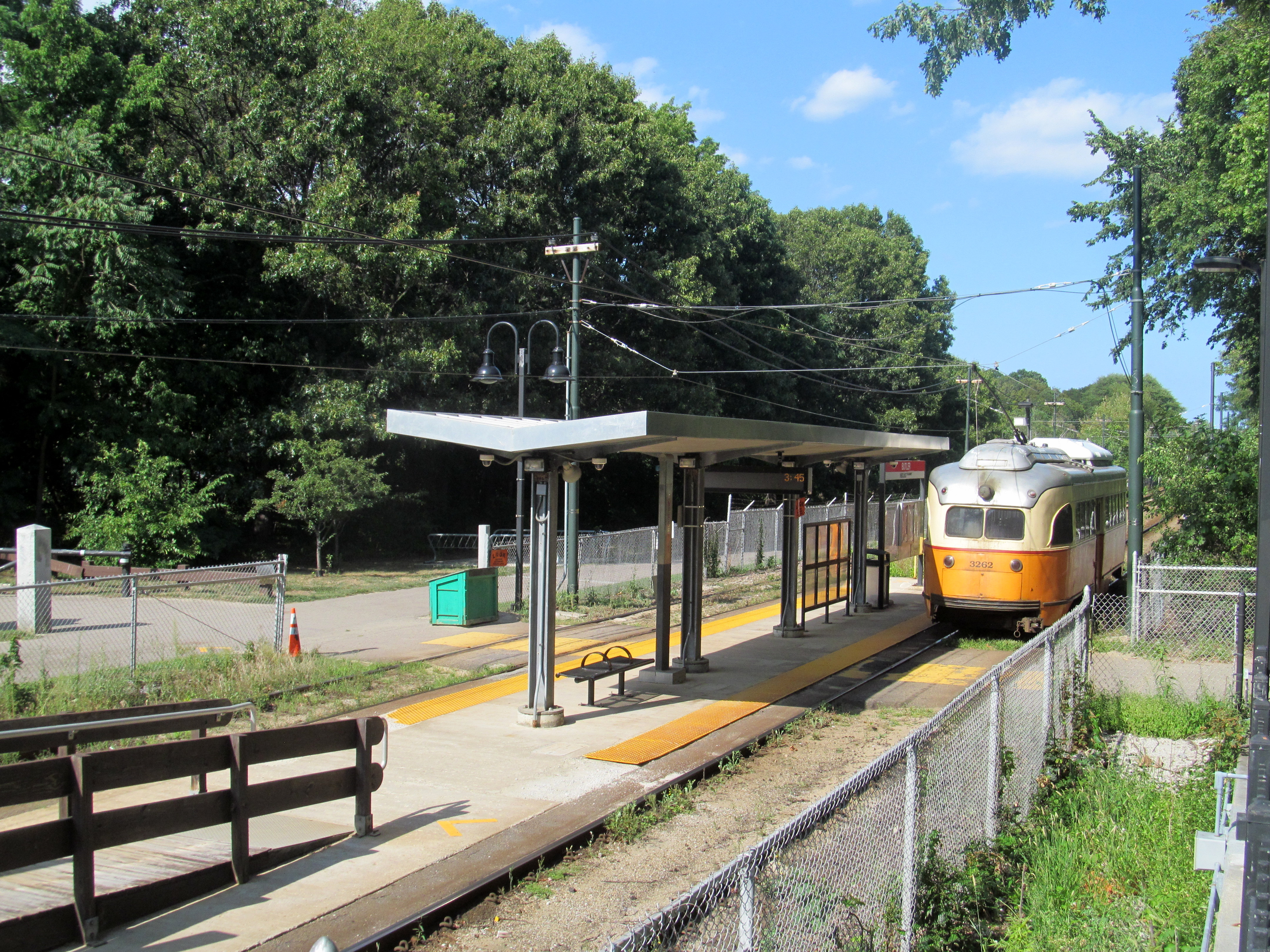
- An inbound streetcar departing Butler station in August 2016

General information
- Location: Butler Street and Branchfield Street; Boston, Massachusetts
- Coordinates: 42.27241°N 71.06257°W
- Lines: Milton Branch, Shawmut Branch
- Platforms: 1 island platform
- Tracks: 2

Construction
- Parking: 40 spaces
- Accessible: Yes

History
- Opened: October 7, 1931
- Rebuilt: June 24, 2006–December 22, 2007

Passengers
- 2025: 84 daily boardings

Services
Preceding station	MBTA	Following station
Milton toward Mattapan	Mattapan Line	Cedar Grove toward Ashmont
Location

Butler station is a light rail station in Boston, Massachusetts. It serves the MBTA Mattapan Line. It is located at Butler Street in the Lower Mills section of the Dorchester neighborhood. It serves a small residential area sandwiched between the Neponset River, Cedar Grove Cemetery, and Dorchester Park. Butler station has no MBTA bus connections. It is accessible via a wooden mini-high ramp on the station's single island platform.

== History ==
=== Old Colony branches ===
In December 1847, the Dorchester and Milton Branch Railroad opened from Neponset to Mattapan and was immediately leased by the Old Colony Railroad as its Milton branch. The Old Colony built its Shawmut Branch Railroad from Harrison Square to Milton Lower Mills in December 1872, joining the Milton branch east of Butler. The area that is now the small Butler Street neighborhood was still empty land in the 1870s, but was developed by the late 1880s. The Old Colony Railroad became part of the New Haven Railroad system in 1893. The lines never had a station at Butler Street due to its proximity to Milton proper, though a freight house for Milton was built at the Butler Street crossing by the 1910s.

=== Trolley conversion and Butler station ===
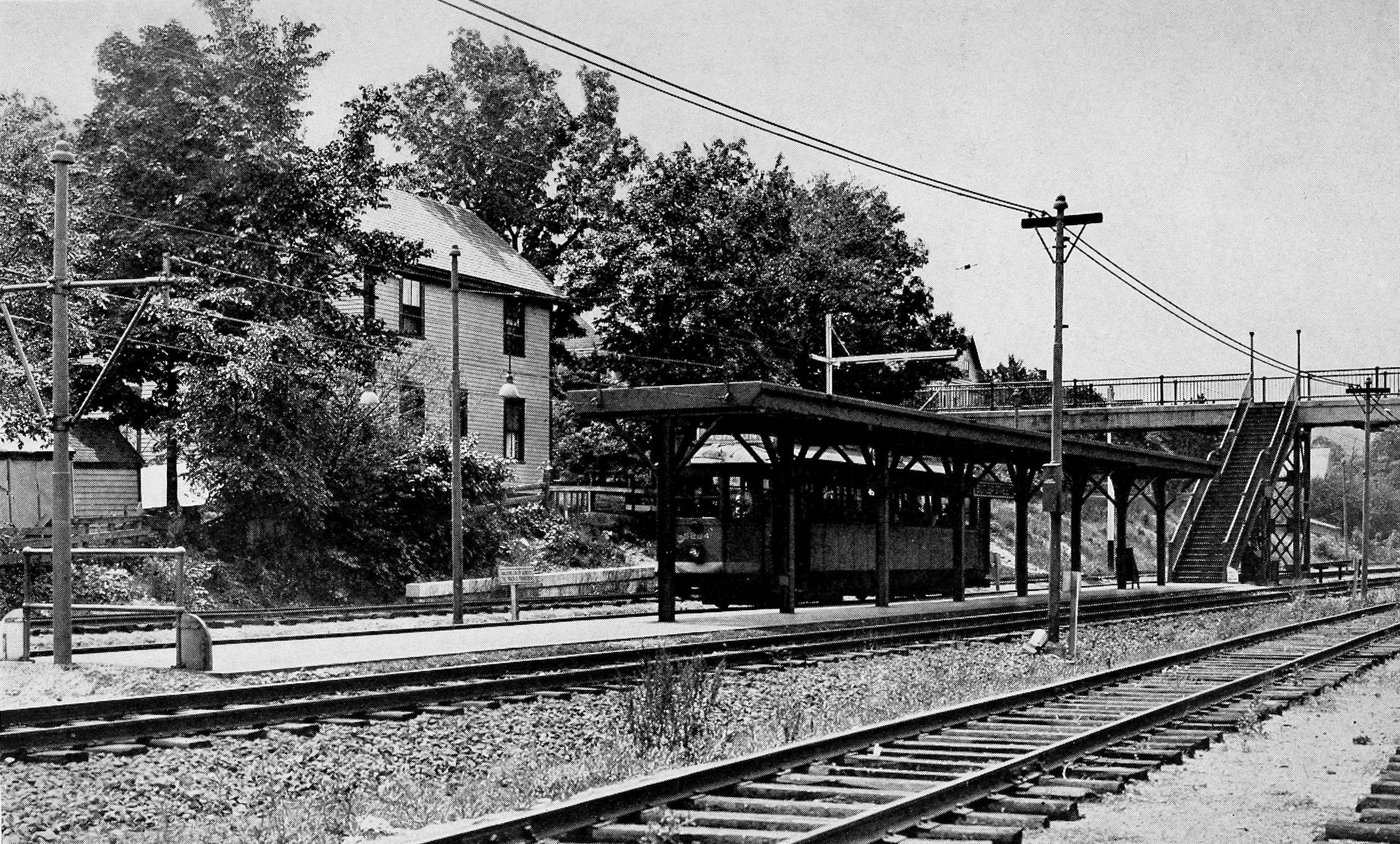
The newly opened Butler Street station in 1931

Passenger service on the Shawmut Branch ended on September 6, 1926 to allow the Boston Elevated Railway to construct its rapid transit Dorchester Extension to Ashmont. Construction on a high-speed trolley line from Ashmont to Mattapan began in early 1929, and the line opened as far as Milton on August 26, 1929. The high-speed trolley line entered the center of the Milton branch right of way on a flyover, and ran to Milton flanked by the Milton branch tracks. Commuter rail service ended when the trolley line reached Milton, over the protests of Milton residents who wanted limited service kept while the trolley line was extended to Mattapan. After four more months of construction, the full trolley line was opened to Mattapan on December 21, 1929.

In 1930, the Boston Transit Department authorized the construction of an infill station at Butler Street, at an estimated cost of $13,695, to serve the small adjacent neighborhood. Butler Street station opened on October 7, 1931. Uniquely on the line, the station was built with a single center island platform rather than two side platforms; this was necessary because freight service continued on the Milton branch, which bracketed the trolley tracks. A footbridge spanned both freight and trolley tracks, with a set of stairs leading to the station platform, which was covered by a canopy. The freight house remained in use by the New Haven Railroad.

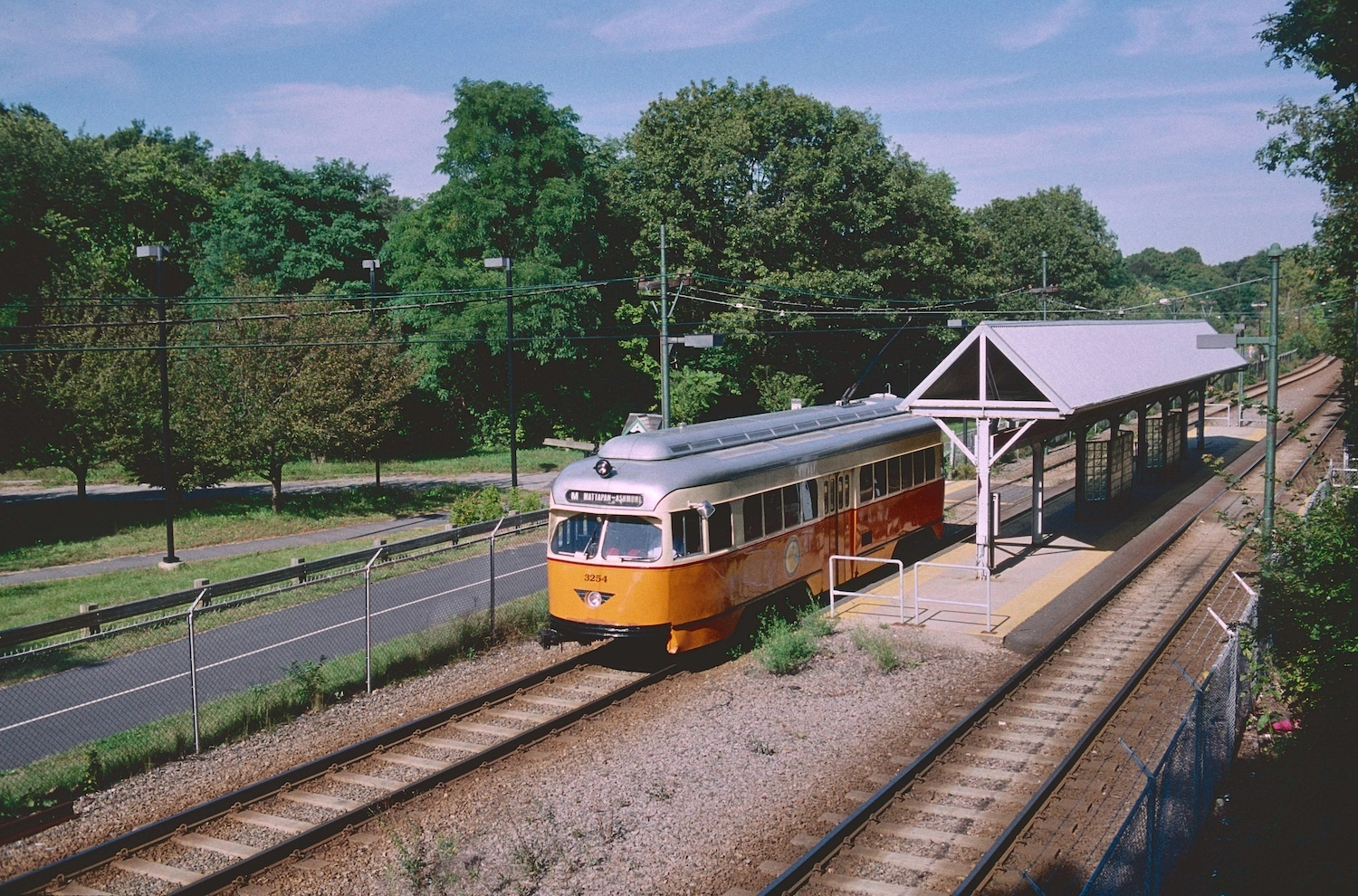
In 2004, two years before the station was closed for modernization

A parking lot north of the station was built in 1951. The MTA began charging for parking at its stations, including Butler, on November 2, 1953. In the early 1980s, the station was rebuilt. The pedestrian bridge was removed and a grade crossing built for platform access; the outer parts also served as small side platforms. An awkward gable roof was added to the old canopy supports.

The MBTA closed the line on June 24, 2006 to allow a new viaduct to be constructed at Ashmont station. During the closure, all stations on the line were modernized and (except for Valley Road) made accessible. Butler station received a new platform and canopy, with a wooden ramp for accessibility. Trolley service resumed on December 22, 2007.

The MBTA plans to convert the line to modern light rail equipment. All stations would have raised platforms for level boarding on the new vehicles. Construction cost for Butler station was estimated as $9.5 million in 2023.
