= Butler Elementary School =

Butler Elementary School may refer to:

- Butler Elementary School (Springfield, Illinois), Springfield, Illinois
- Butler Elementary School, Fort Dodge, Iowa
- Butler Elementary School, a school in the Arlington Independent School District in Arlington, Texas
