= Butler High School =

Butler High School may refer to:

- Butler High School (Augusta, Georgia)
- Butler High School (Gainesville, Georgia)
- Butler High School (Butler, Missouri)
- Butler High School (New Jersey), Butler, New Jersey
- Butler High School (Butler, Oklahoma)
- Butler High School (Vandalia, Ohio)
- Butler High School (Butler, Pennsylvania)
- Butler County High School, Morgantown, Kentucky
- Butler Traditional High School, Louisville, Kentucky
- Candy Butler High School, King City, California
- David W. Butler High School, Matthews, North Carolina
- S. R. Butler High School, Huntsville, Alabama
- Butler College (Perth), Western Australia

== See also ==
- Butler College (disambiguation)
