= Kelly House =

Kelly House may refer to:

- Kelly House, Devon, a manor house and estate in Devon, England
- C.D. Kelly House, in Judsonia, Arkansas
- John and Kate Kelly House, in Honolulu, Hawaii, a National Register of Historic Places listing in Oahu
- Edward M. Kelly House, in Wichita, Kansas, a National Register of Historic Places listing in Sedgwick County, Kansas
- George H. Kelly House, in Omaha, Nebraska
- Eugene V. Kelly Carriage House, at Seton Hall University, South Orange, New Jersey
- Daniel T. Kelly House, in Santa Fe, New Mexico, a National Register of Historic Places listing in Santa Fe County, New Mexico
- Col. William Kelly House, in Buffalo, New York
- Kelly House (Syracuse, New York)
- Alexander Kelly House, in Carthage, North Carolina
- J. Nelson Kelly House, in Grand Forks, North Dakota
- Joseph D. and Margaret Kelly House, in The Dalles, Oregon
- Amos Kelly House, in Cambridge Springs, Pennsylvania
- Albert H. Kelly House, in Salt Lake City, Utah
- John B. Kelly House, in Salt Lake City, Utah
- T.R. Kelly House, in Springville, Utah

== See also ==
- Glaser-Kelly House, in Sheridan, Arkansas
- Kelley House (disambiguation)
- Kelly Family Home, in Dayton, Ohio
- Ormsby-Kelly House, in Emmetsburg, Iowa
- Phillips-Turner-Kelly House, in Monticello, Georgia, a National Register of Historic Places listing in Jasper County, Georgia
