= Kelley House =

Kelley House may refer to:

in the United States

(by state then city)

- James Kelley House (Tennille, Georgia), listed on the National Register of Historic Places (NRHP) in Washington County
- Marion and Julia Kelley House, Hazelton, Idaho, listed on the NRHP in Jerome County
- Kelley-Fredrickson House and Office Building, South Bend, Indiana, listed on the NRHP in St. Joseph County
- Kelley House (Dubuque, Iowa), listed on the NRHP in Dubuque County
- John S. Kelley House, Bardstown, Kentucky, listed on the NRHP in Nelson County
- James Kelley House (Bowling Green, Kentucky), listed on the NRHP in Warren County
- Mercelia Evelyn Eldridge Kelley House, Chatham, Massachusetts, listed on the NRHP in Barnstable County
- Oliver H. Kelley Homestead, Elk River, Minnesota, listed on the NRHP in Sherburne County
- Kelley-Reppert Motor Company Building, Kansas City, Missouri, listed on the NRHP in Jackson County
- Barney Kelley House, Washington Courthouse, Ohio, listed on the NRHP in Fayette County
- Jacob Kelley House, Hartsville, South Carolina, listed on the NRHP in Darlington County
- Kelley House (Chattanooga, Tennessee), listed on the NRHP in Hamilton County
- Mancel Kelley House, Dayton, Washington, listed on the NRHP in Columbia County

== See also ==
- Kelly House (disambiguation)
- James Kelley House (disambiguation)
