= Koon House No. 1 =

Historic house in Arkansas, United States

- Koon House #1
- U.S. National Register of Historic Places
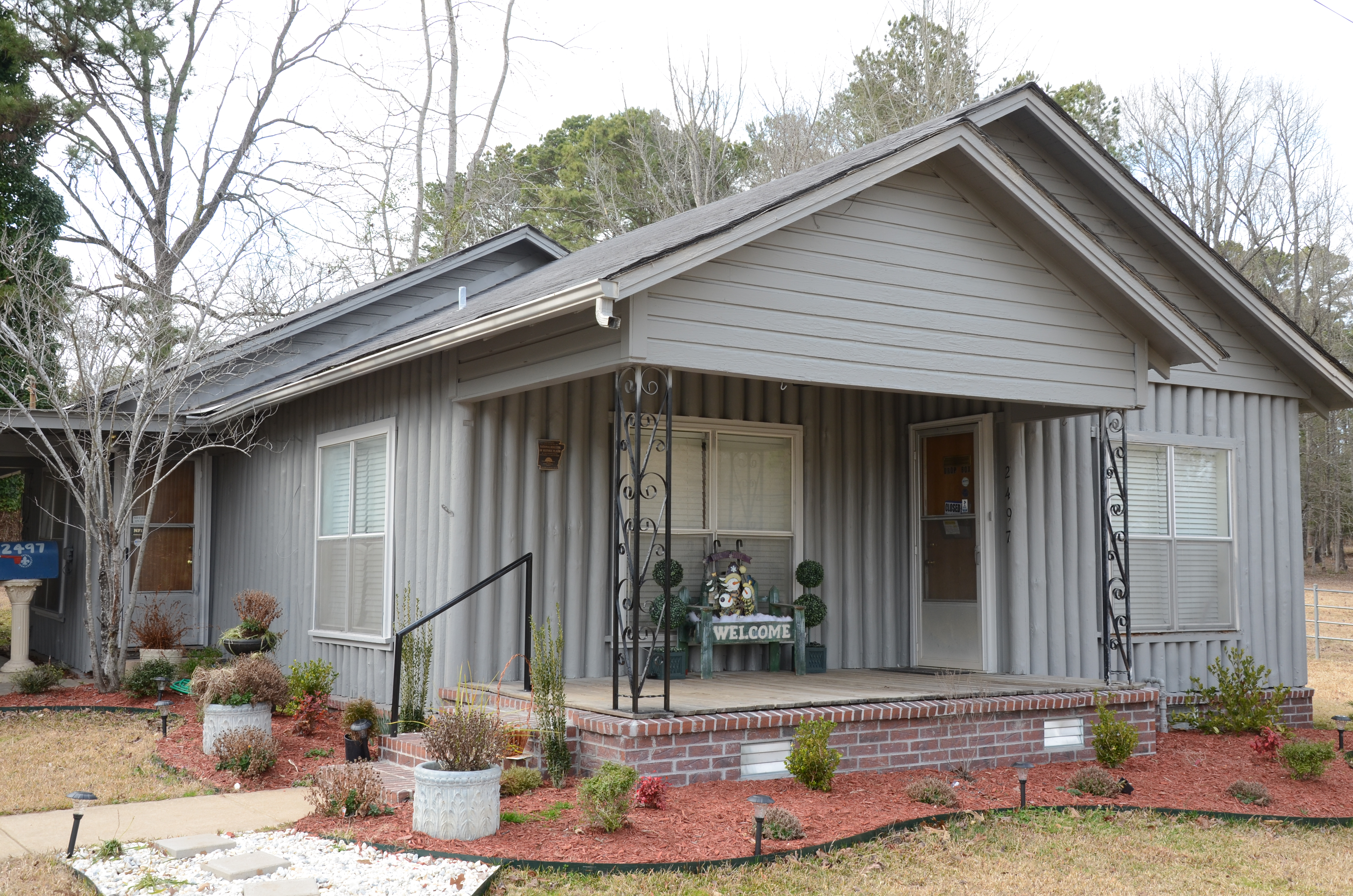

- Location within Arkansas Location within the United States
- Location: Jct. of US 167 and Cty Rd. 523, Sheridan, Arkansas
- Coordinates: 34°16′29″N 92°23′57″W
- Area: less than one acre
- Built: 1940
- Architect: Hillary Henry "Pappy" Koon
- MPS: Vertical Split Log Buildings of "Slabtown", Arkansas MPS
- NRHP reference No.: 99001249
- Added to NRHP: October 14, 1999

The Koon House No. 1 is a historic house at U.S. Highway 167 and Grant County Road 523 in Sheridan, Arkansas. It is a single story structure, built out of small logs split in half and set facing round side out and smooth side in. Its front facade is dominated by a projecting gable-roofed porch. The house was built in 1940 by Hillary Henry "Pappy" Koon, and is one of several houses built in this distinctive manner in the area by Koon.

The house was listed on the National Register of Historic Places in 1999.

== See also ==
- National Register of Historic Places listings in Grant County, Arkansas
