= Koon House No. 6 =

Historic house in Arkansas, United States

- Koon House #3
- U.S. National Register of Historic Places
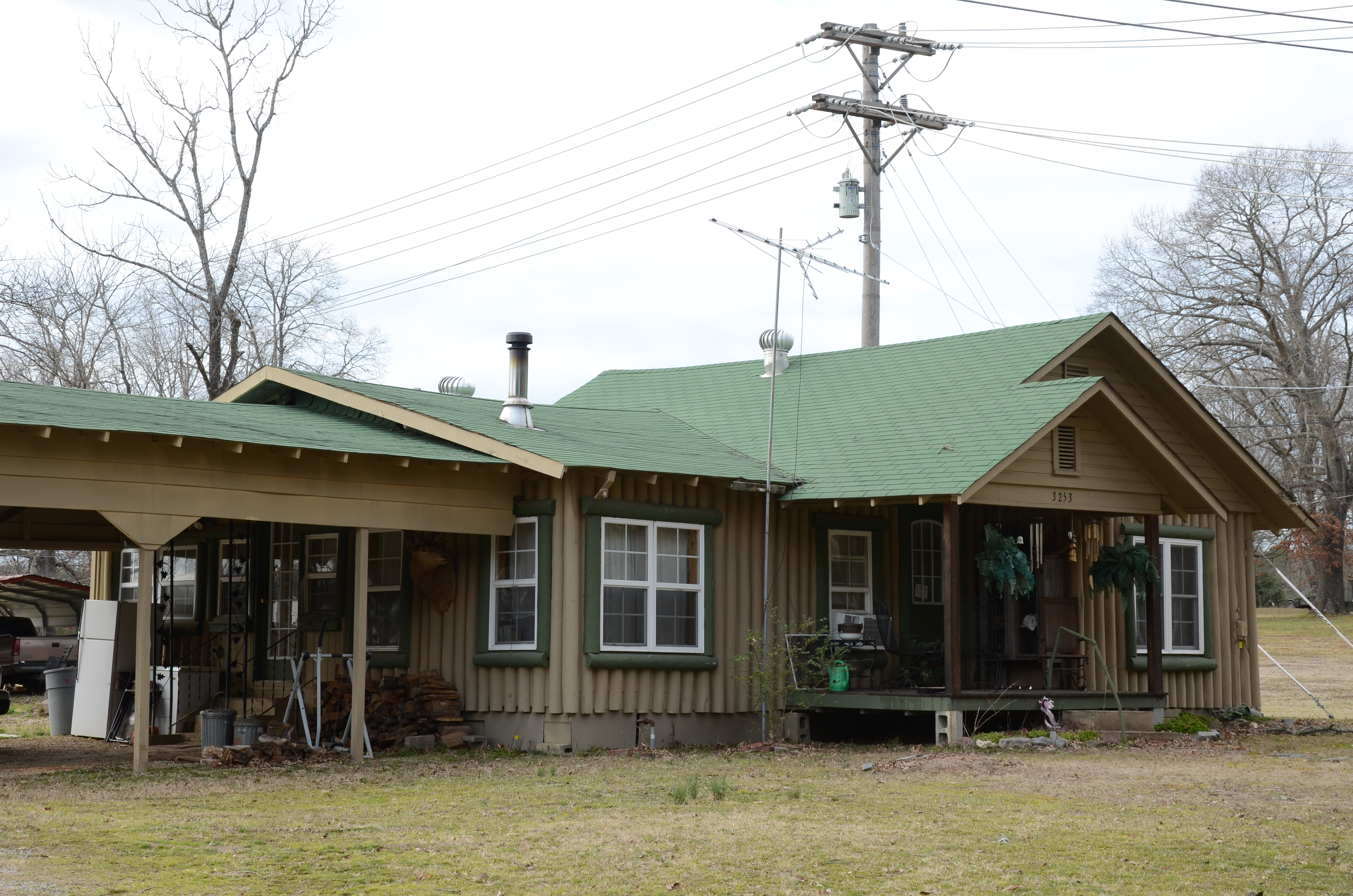

- Location within Arkansas Location within the United States
- Location: 3253 AR 167, Sheridan, Arkansas
- Coordinates: 34°15′49″N 92°23′58″W
- Area: less than one acre
- Built: 1940
- Architect: Hillary Henry "Pappy" Koon
- MPS: Vertical Split Log Buildings of "Slabtown", Arkansas MPS
- NRHP reference No.: 99001245
- Added to NRHP: October 14, 1999

The Koon House No. 6 is a historic house at 3253 U.S. Highway 167 in Sheridan, Arkansas. It is a single story structure, built out of vertically placed small logs, split in half and set smooth side in and round side out. The west (rear) side has been refinished in wood paneling. The building is roughly rectangular in shape, with a gable roof and a gabled front porch, which shelters a recessed entrance. The house was built about 1940 by Hillary Henry "Pappy" Koon, and is one of several houses built in this distinctive manner in the area by Koon.

The house was listed on the National Register of Historic Places in 1999.

== See also ==
- National Register of Historic Places listings in Grant County, Arkansas
