= Dr. John L. Butler House =

Historic house in Arkansas, United States

- U.S. National Register of Historic Places
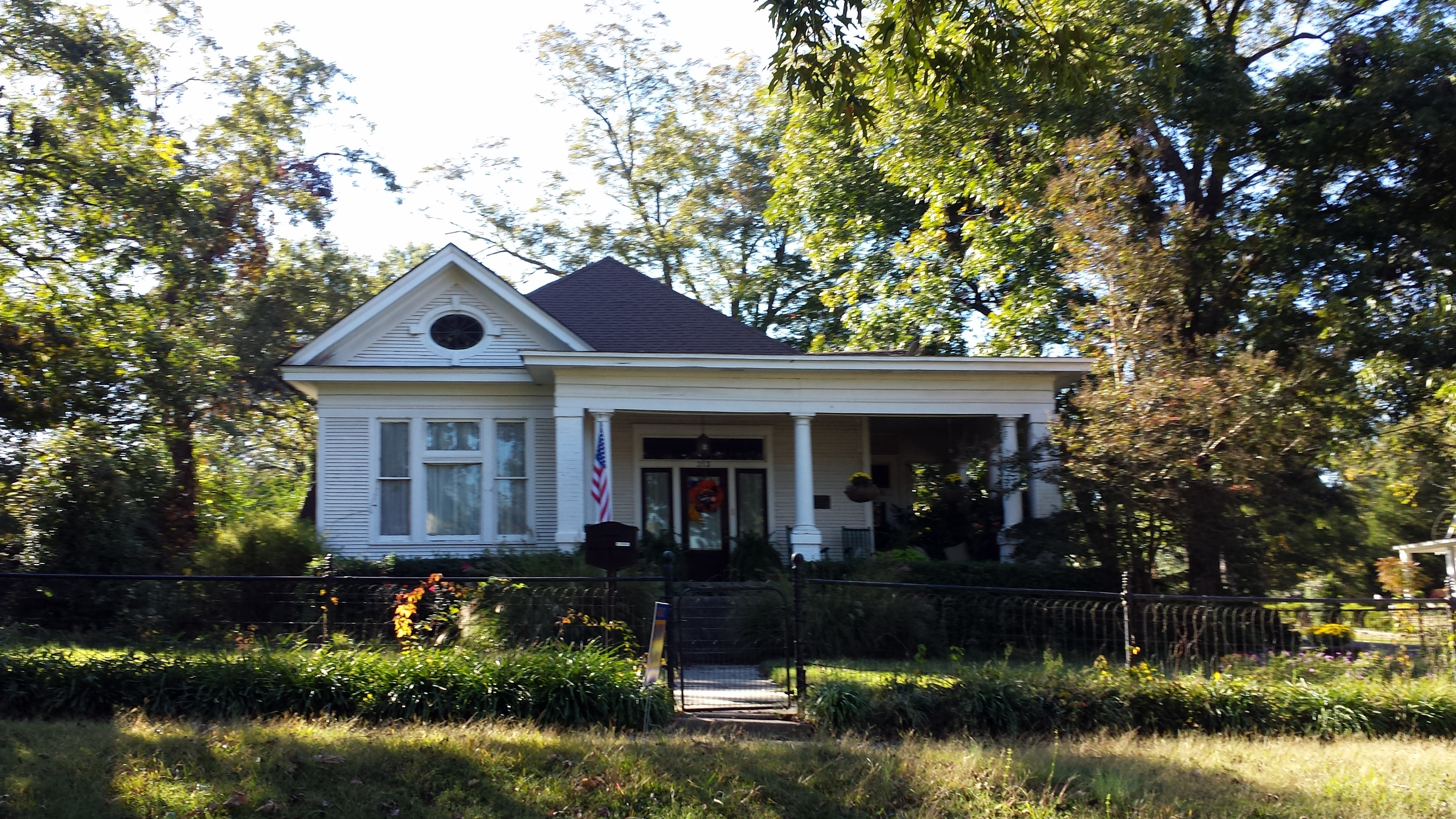

- Location within Arkansas Location within the United States
- Location: 313 Oak St., Sheridan, Arkansas
- Coordinates: 34°18′35″N 92°24′6″W
- Area: less than one acre
- Built: 1914
- Architectural style: Colonial Revival
- NRHP reference No.: 86002848
- Added to NRHP: October 9, 1986

The Dr. John L. Butler House is a historic house at 313 Oak Street in Sheridan, Arkansas. It is a single-story wood-frame structure, with a hip roof, weatherboard siding, and a brick foundation. A gabled section projects on the left front facade, with a fully pedimented gable that has an oculus window at its center. To the right is a porch that wraps around the side of the house, supported by Doric columns set on brick piers. The interior retains most of its original walnut woodwork, including pocket doors. Built in 1914 for a prominent local doctor, it is one of the city's finest examples of Colonial Revival architecture.

The house was listed on the National Register of Historic Places in 1986.

== See also ==
- National Register of Historic Places listings in Grant County, Arkansas
