= Koon House No. 4 =

Historic house in Arkansas, United States

- Koon House #3
- U.S. National Register of Historic Places
- Location within Arkansas Location within the United States
- Location: 3004 AR 167, Sheridan, Arkansas
- Coordinates: 34°16′3″N 92°23′57″W
- Area: less than one acre
- Built: 1940
- Architect: Hillary Henry "Pappy" Koon
- MPS: Vertical Split Log Buildings of "Slabtown", Arkansas MPS
- NRHP reference No.: 99001246
- Added to NRHP: October 14, 1999

The Koon House No. 4 is a historic house at 3004 U.S. Highway 167 in Sheridan, Arkansas, USA. It is a single story structure, built out of vertically placed small logs, split in half and set smooth side in and round side out. It is roughly rectangular in shape, with a cross gable roof. A rectangular section projects from on side near the rear, and it has a front porch recessed under a gable projecting from the left front. The house was built about 1940 by Hillary Henry "Pappy" Koon and is one of several houses in the area built by him in this distinctive manner.

The house was listed on the National Register of Historic Places in 1999.

== See also ==
- National Register of Historic Places listings in Grant County, Arkansas
