= Oak Grove School (Grant County, Arkansas) =

- U.S. National Register of Historic Places
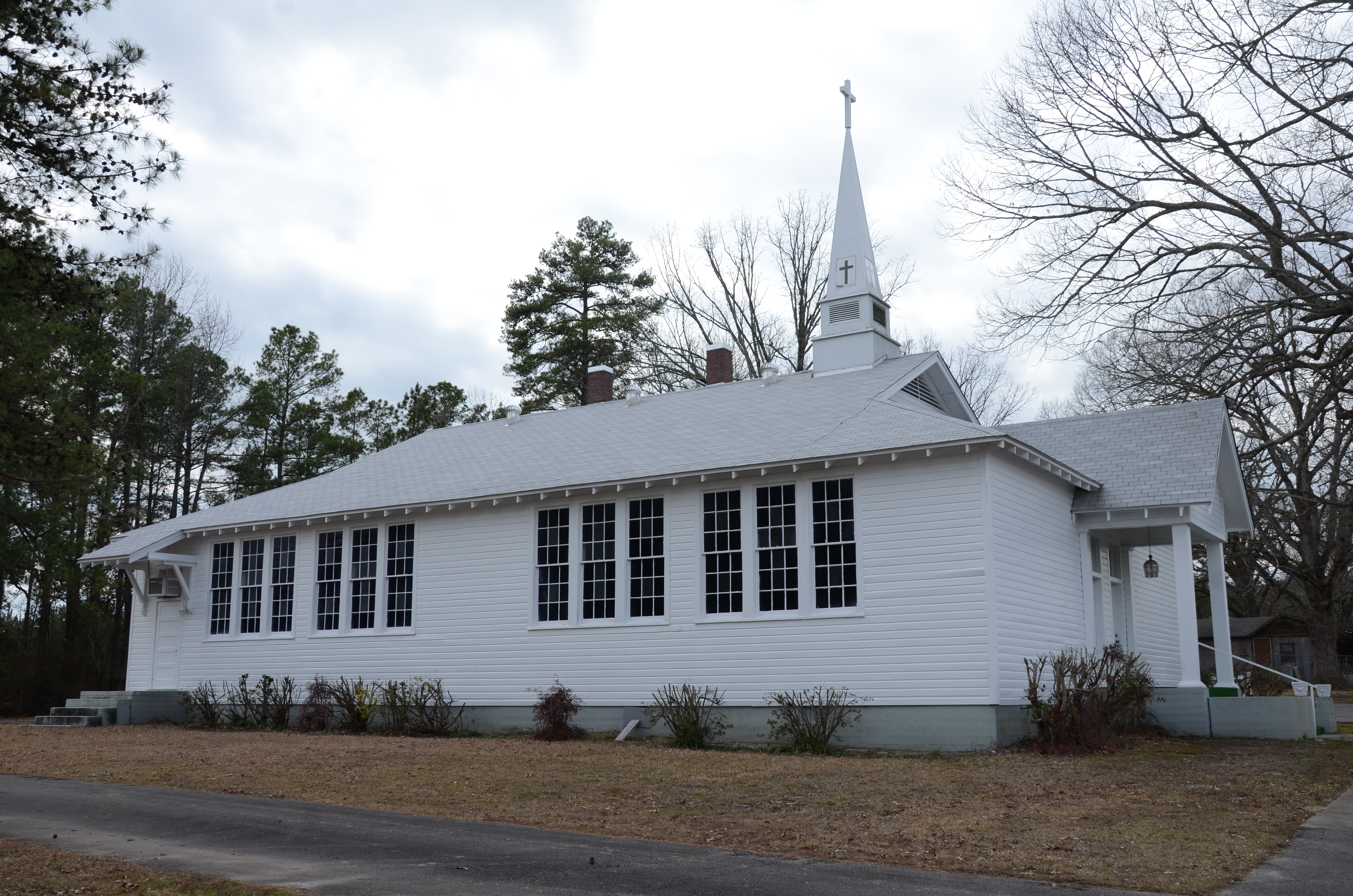

- Location within Arkansas Location within the United States
- Location: US 270, 6 miles (9.7 km) E of Sherida, Oak Grove, Grant County, Arkansas
- Coordinates: 34°18′57″N 92°16′51″W
- Area: less than one acre
- Built by: Works Progress Administration
- Architectural style: Bungalow/American Craftsman
- NRHP reference No.: 91000693
- Added to NRHP: June 14, 1991

The Oak Grove School is a historic school building in rural eastern Grant County, Arkansas. It is located on the south side of United States Route 270, about 6 miles (9.7 km) east of Sheridan, and is now home to the Center Grove United Methodist Church. It is a single-story wood-frame structure, with a hip roof and novelty siding. It was built in 1938 with funding from the Works Progress Administration, and originally housed four classrooms. It was used as a school until 1950, and has served as the church since then.

The building was listed on the National Register of Historic Places in 1991.

== See also ==
- National Register of Historic Places listings in Grant County, Arkansas
