= Koon House No. 2 =

Historic house in Arkansas, United States

- Koon House #2
- U.S. National Register of Historic Places
- Location within Arkansas Location within the United States
- Location: 2959 AR 167, Sheridan, Arkansas
- Coordinates: 34°16′4″N 92°23′58″W
- Area: less than one acre
- Built: 1936
- Architect: Hillary Henry "Pappy" Koon
- MPS: Vertical Split Log Buildings of "Slabtown", Arkansas MPS
- NRHP reference No.: 99001248
- Added to NRHP: October 14, 1999

The Koon House No. 2 is a historic house at 2959 U.S. Highway 167 in Sheridan, Arkansas. It is a single story structure, built out of vertically placed small logs, split in half and set smooth side in and round side out. It is roughly T-shaped, with a frame addition and a carport added later in the 20th century. The house was built in 1936 by Hillary Henry "Pappy" Koon, and is one of several houses built in this distinctive manner in the area by Koon. It is the first of the type he built, and was used as his family residence.

The house was listed on the National Register of Historic Places in 1999.

== See also ==
- National Register of Historic Places listings in Grant County, Arkansas
