= James Kelley House =

James Kelley House may refer to:

- James Kelley House (Tennille, Georgia), listed on the National Register of Historic Places (NRHP) in Washington County
- James Kelley House (Bowling Green, Kentucky), listed on the NRHP in Warren County

== See also ==
- Kelley House (disambiguation)
