= Grant County Courthouse (Arkansas) =

- U.S. National Register of Historic Places
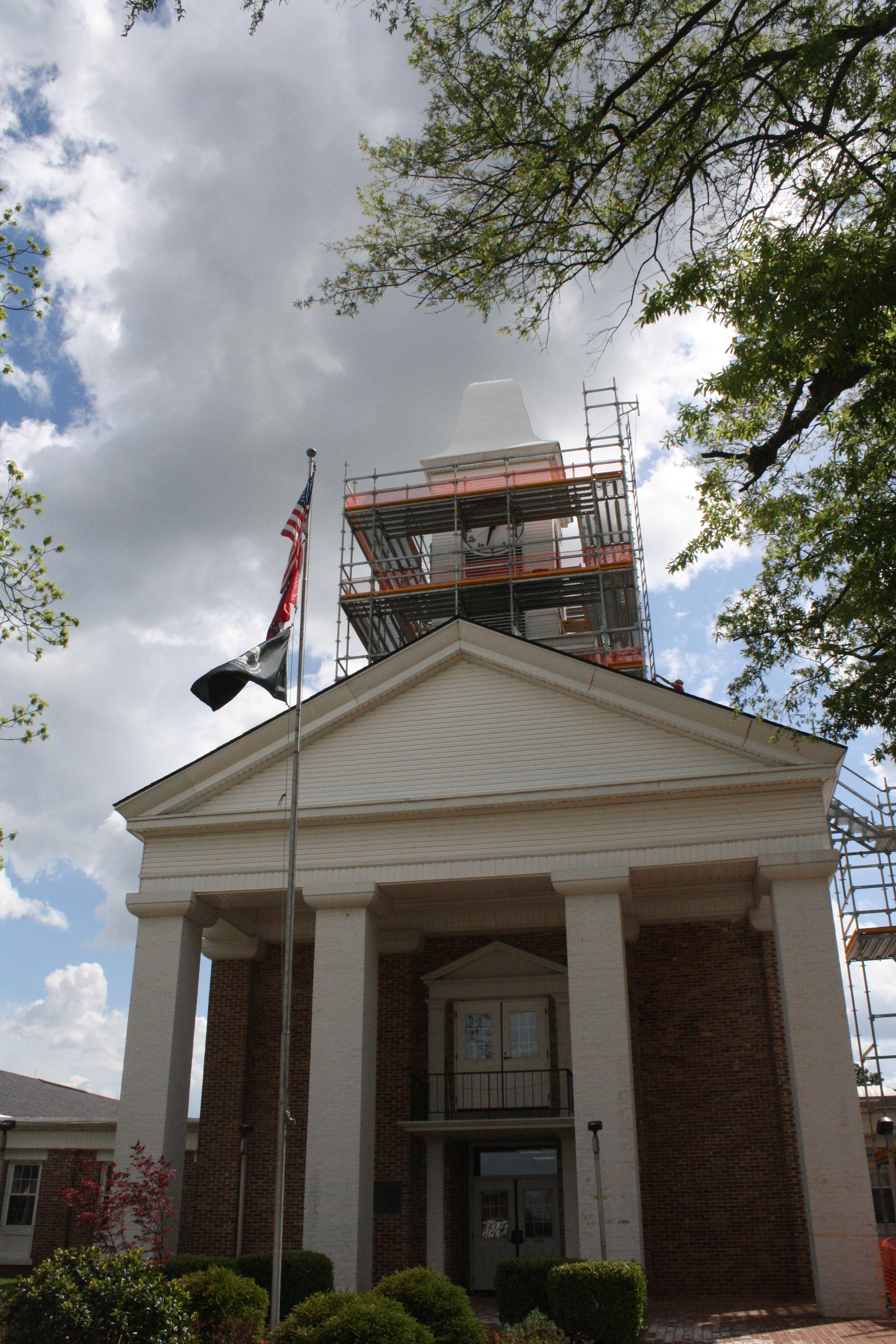

- Location within Arkansas Location within the United States
- Location: 101 W. Center St. Sheridan, Arkansas
- Coordinates: 34°18′24″N 92°24′03″W
- Area: 2 acres (0.81 ha)
- Built: 1963
- Built by: Ernest J. Ward, Inc.
- Architect: Ginocchio, Cromwell, Carter and Neyland
- Architectural style: Colonial Revival
- NRHP reference No.: 100013011
- Added to NRHP: May 18, 2026

The Grant County Courthouse is located at 101 W. Center Street in Sheridan, Arkansas. The Colonial Revival building was designed by Arkansas architect Ginocchio, Cromwell, Carter, and Neyland with a two-story central section with clock tower and two single-story wings connected by hyphens.

The building was listed on the National Register of Historic Places in 2026.

== See also ==
- List of county courthouses in Arkansas
- National Register of Historic Places listings in Grant County, Arkansas
