= Samuel D. Byrd Sr. Homestead =

Historic house in Arkansas, United States

- U.S. National Register of Historic Places
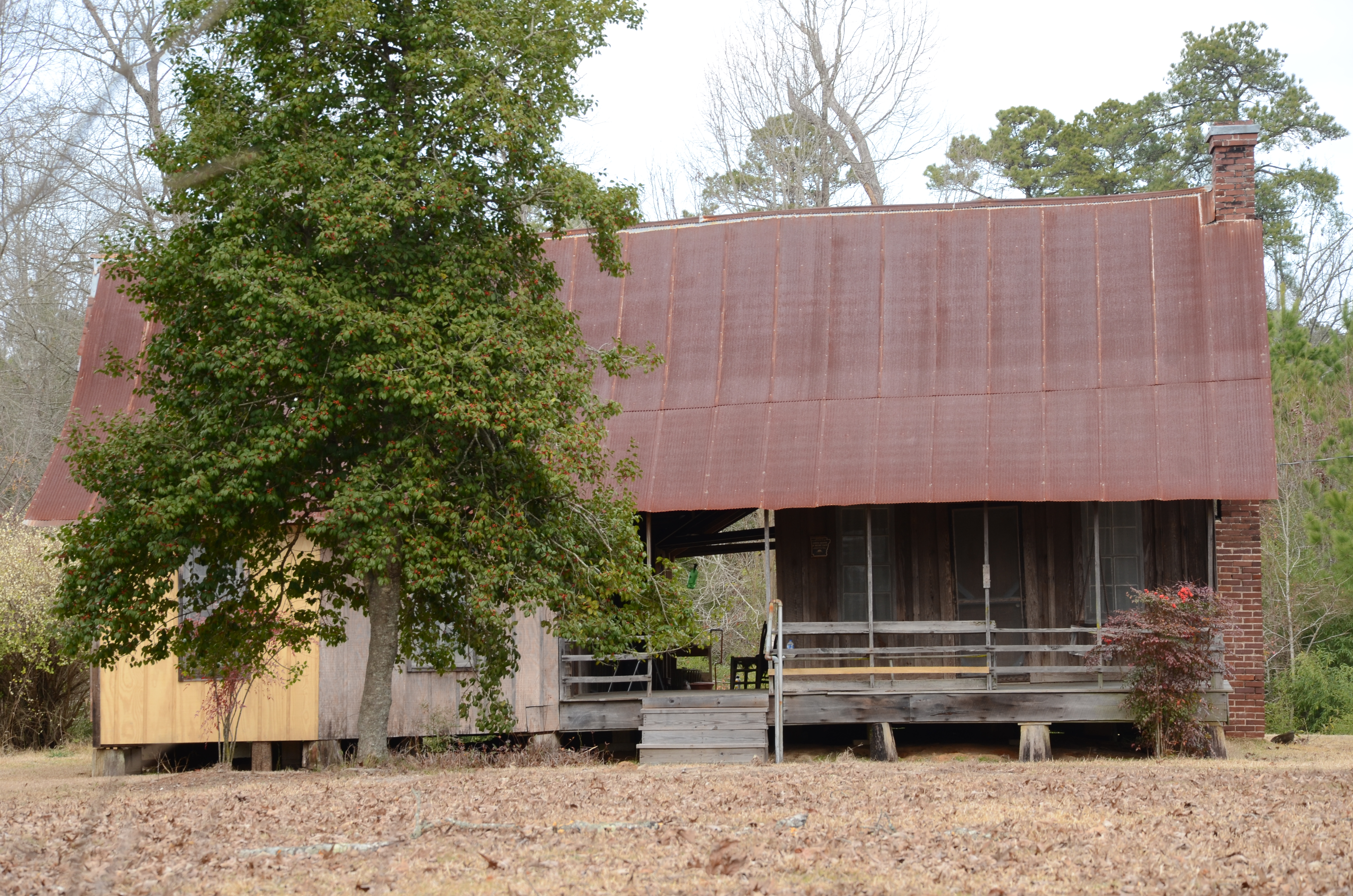

- Location within Arkansas Location within the United States
- Nearest city: Poyen, Arkansas
- Coordinates: 34°20′30″N 92°39′43″W
- Area: 1.5 acres (0.61 ha)
- Built: 1848
- Architect: Samuel D. Byrd Sr.
- Architectural style: Plain traditional
- NRHP reference No.: 04001494
- Added to NRHP: January 20, 2005

The Samuel D. Byrd Sr. Homestead is a historic farmstead at 15966 United States Route 270, near Poyen, Arkansas. The main house of the farmstead is a single story dogtrot structure, with one log pen built in 1848, and a second pen built out of pine planking in 1850, with a gabled roof covering both pens and the breezeway between. The building has been added to several times, and some of its porches enclosed, to accommodate large families. It was occupied by members of the Byrd family until 2000, and is one of the county's oldest surviving structures.

The house was listed on the National Register of Historic Places in 2005.

== See also ==
- National Register of Historic Places listings in Grant County, Arkansas
