= John B. Kelly House =

Historic house in Salt Lake City, Utah, U.S.

- U.S. National Register of Historic Places
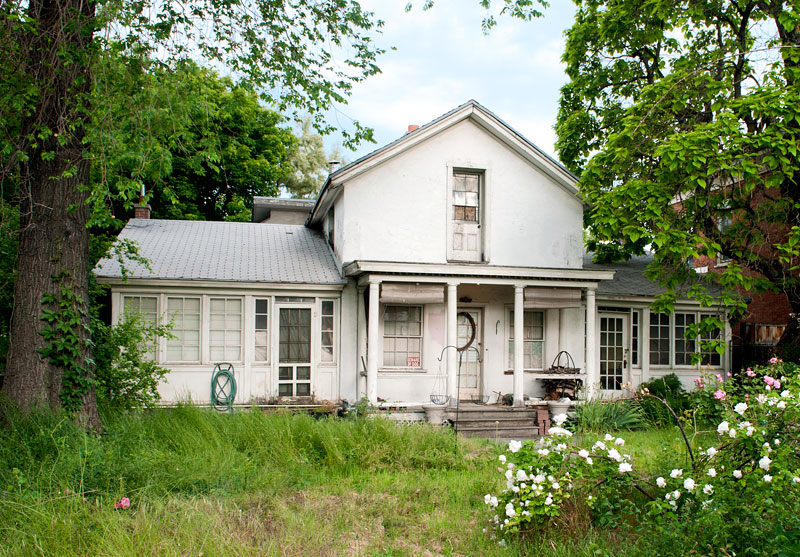
- House in 2011
- Location: 422 South 200 West; Salt Lake City, Utah; United States
- Coordinates: 40°45′36″N 111°53′49″W
- Area: less than one acre
- Built: 1865
- Architectural style: Greek Revival
- NRHP reference No.: 83003172
- Added to NRHP: July 20, 1983

The John B. Kelly House, at 422 South 200 West in Salt Lake City, Utah, was built in 1865. It was listed on the National Register of Historic Places in 1983.

== Description ==
The house was a "temple-form" Greek Revival home that followed a pattern promoted by Minard Lafever, but all built of adobe. It is architecturally significant because it reflects building styles found in New England before this period, indicating the heritage of many early latter-day saints. Although it was of modest size its symmetric front imitated monumental ancient Greek forms. In essence its floor plan was the double-cell type with symmetrical wings flanking either side. These central wings were added after the central, temple-like part. At one point the flat roof of the central porch was enclosed by a balustrade.

It was the home of John Bookbinder Kelly, possibly the first book printer and binder in the city. He lived there with his first wife, Helena Quirk Kelly and their eight surviving children Emma, the polygamous wife he married in 1867, lived nearby. When Helena died in 1877 Emma moved into the home and raised Emma's children with her own daughter, Lily. Sometime in this historic period the two porches at the front of the wings were enclosed with windows and one door each. When John died Emma lived in the home until her own death decades later. Lily and her descendants inherited it, eventually dividing it into apartments in 1931 after adding a brick addition to the back and walling up a door to the north wing, sealing it off from the rest of the house. At some point around this time the external adobe of the house was stuccoed to protect it from the elements. In the 1950s a frame and stucco addition was added above the brick one and the home's interior staircase was removed. An enclosed one was added to the rear exterior, creating a third apartment.

John B. Kelly's house was one of only two known examples of its architectural type in all of Utah; the other, the Alma Staker House in Mount Pleasant, Utah is also NRHP-listed. The Kelly House's listing did not protect it from demolition, however. In 2022 it was razed and replaced with an apartment building.

== See also ==
- National Register of Historic Places listings in Salt Lake City
