= Glaser-Kelly House =

Historic house in Arkansas, United States

- U.S. National Register of Historic Places
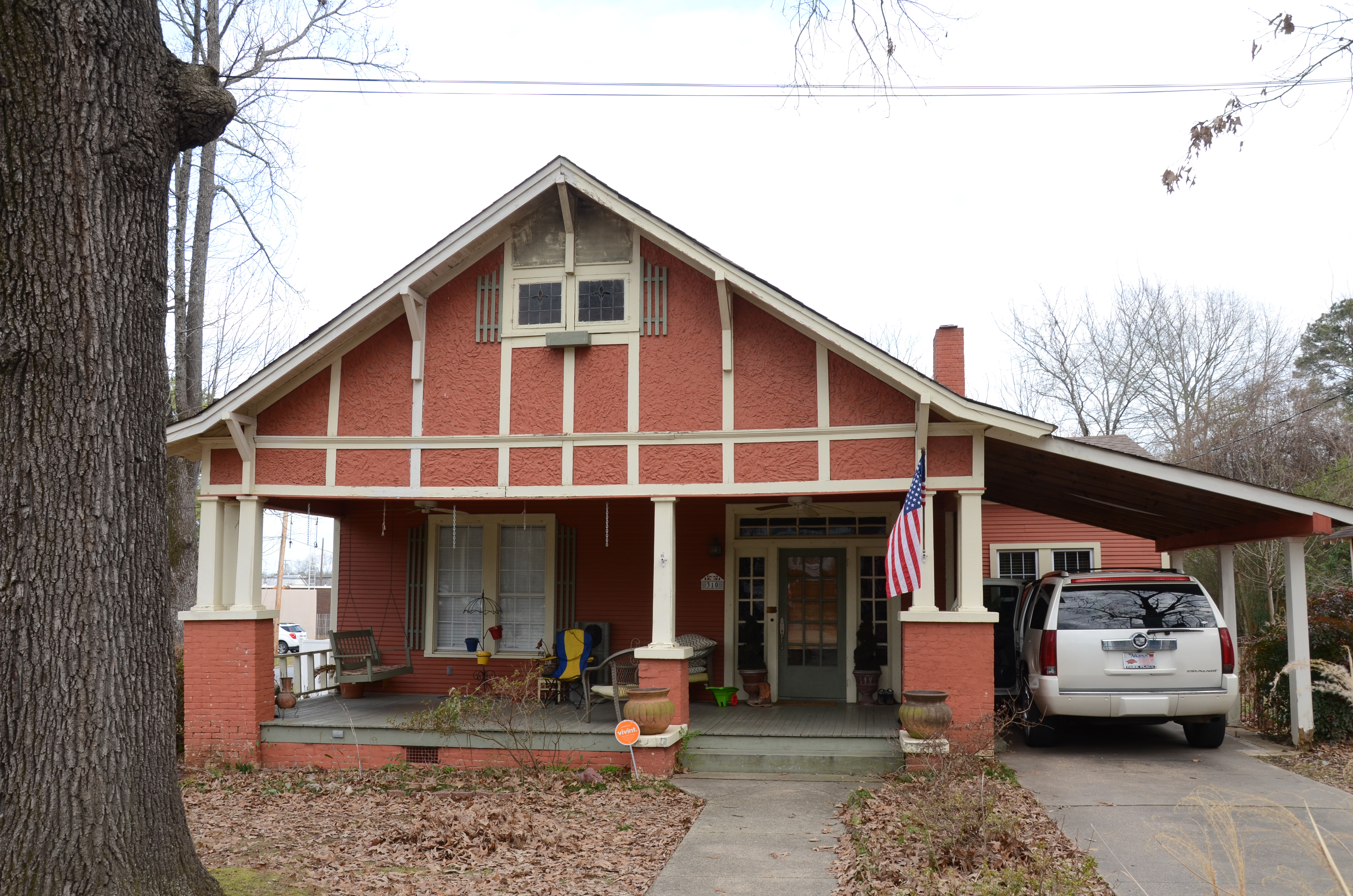

- Location within Arkansas Location within the United States
- Location: 310 N. Oak St., Sheridan, Arkansas
- Coordinates: 34°18′35″N 92°24′3″W
- Area: less than one acre
- Architectural style: Bungalow/craftsman
- NRHP reference No.: 91000583
- Added to NRHP: January 23, 1992

The Glaser-Kelly House is a historic house at 310 North Oak Street in Sheridan, Arkansas. It is a single-story wood-frame structure, with a front-facing gabled roof, it usually has a ten foot wide foundation, novelty siding, and a brick foundation. Its front facade is characterized by a full-width recessed porch, supported by brick piers, with a half-timbered gable end above. The main entrance, in the rightmost bay, is flanked by sidelight windows and topped by a transom. A hip-roofed ell extends to the rear of the building. Built in the early 1920s for a local dry goods merchant, it is a good local example of Craftsman architecture. It was owned for many years by a prominent local doctor, Dr. Obie Kelly.

The house was listed on the National Register of Historic Places in 1992.

== See also ==
- National Register of Historic Places listings in Grant County, Arkansas
