= National Register of Historic Places listings in Grant County, Arkansas =

Location of Grant County in Arkansas

This is a list of the National Register of Historic Places listings in Grant County, Arkansas.

This is intended to be a complete list of the properties on the National Register of Historic Places in Grant County, Arkansas, United States. The locations of National Register properties for which the latitude and longitude coordinates are included below, may be seen in a map.

There are 11 properties listed on the National Register in the county, including 1 National Historic Landmark.

Contents: Counties in Arkansas
- Arkansas
- Ashley
- Baxter
- Benton
- Boone
- Bradley
- Calhoun
- Carroll
- Chicot
- Clark
- Clay
- Cleburne
- Cleveland
- Columbia
- Conway
- Craighead
- Crawford
- Crittenden
- Cross
- Dallas
- Desha
- Drew
- Faulkner
- Franklin
- Fulton
- Garland
- Grant
- Greene
- Hempstead
- Hot Spring
- Howard
- Independence
- Izard
- Jackson
- Jefferson
- Johnson
- Lafayette
- Lawrence
- Lee
- Lincoln
- Little River
- Logan
- Lonoke
- Madison
- Marion
- Miller
- Mississippi
- Monroe
- Montgomery
- Nevada
- Newton
- Ouachita
- Perry
- Phillips
- Pike
- Poinsett
- Polk
- Pope
- Prairie
- Pulaski (Little Rock)
- Randolph
- St. Francis
- Saline
- Scott
- Searcy
- Sebastian
- Sevier
- Sharp
- Stone
- Union
- Van Buren
- Washington
- White
- Woodruff
- Yell

This National Park Service list is complete through NPS recent listings posted May 22, 2026.

== Current listings ==
	Name on the Register	Image	Date listed	Location	City or town	Description
1	Dr. John L. Butler House	Dr. John L. Butler House	October 9, 1986 (#86002848)	313 Oak St. 34°18′35″N 92°24′06″W	Sheridan	
2	Samuel D. Byrd Sr. Homestead	Samuel D. Byrd Sr. Homestead	January 20, 2005 (#04001494)	15966 US 270, W. 34°20′30″N 92°39′43″W	Poyen	
3	Glaser-Kelly House	Glaser-Kelly House	January 23, 1992 (#91000583)	310 N. Oak St. 34°18′35″N 92°24′03″W	Sheridan	
4	Grant County Courthouse	Grant County Courthouse	May 18, 2026 (#100013011)	101 West Center Street; 34°18′24″N 92°24′03″W	Sheridan	
5	Jenkins' Ferry Battleground	Jenkins' Ferry Battleground	January 21, 1970 (#70000120)	Northeast of Leola on Highway 46; 34°11′53″N 92°34′00″W	Leola	One of the Camden Expedition Sites, a National Historic Landmark consisting of sites in several counties
6	Koon House #1	Koon House #1	October 14, 1999 (#99001249)	Junction of US 167 and County Road 523; 34°16′29″N 92°23′57″W	Sheridan	
7	Koon House #2	Koon House #2	October 14, 1999 (#99001248)	2959 US 167; 34°16′04″N 92°23′58″W	Sheridan	
8	Koon House #3		October 14, 1999 (#99001247)	2988 US 167; 34°16′04″N 92°23′57″W	Sheridan	Demolished
9	Koon House #4		October 14, 1999 (#99001246)	3004 US 167; 34°16′03″N 92°23′57″W	Sheridan	Demolished
10	Koon House #6	Koon House #6	October 14, 1999 (#99001245)	3253 US 167; 34°15′49″N 92°23′58″W	Sheridan	
11	Oak Grove School	Oak Grove School	June 14, 1991 (#91000693)	U.S. Route 270, 6 miles east of Sheridan; 34°18′57″N 92°16′51″W	Oak Grove	

== See also ==
- List of National Historic Landmarks in Arkansas
- National Register of Historic Places listings in Arkansas
