= C.D. Kelly House =

Historic house in Arkansas, United States

- C. D. Kelly House
- U.S. National Register of Historic Places
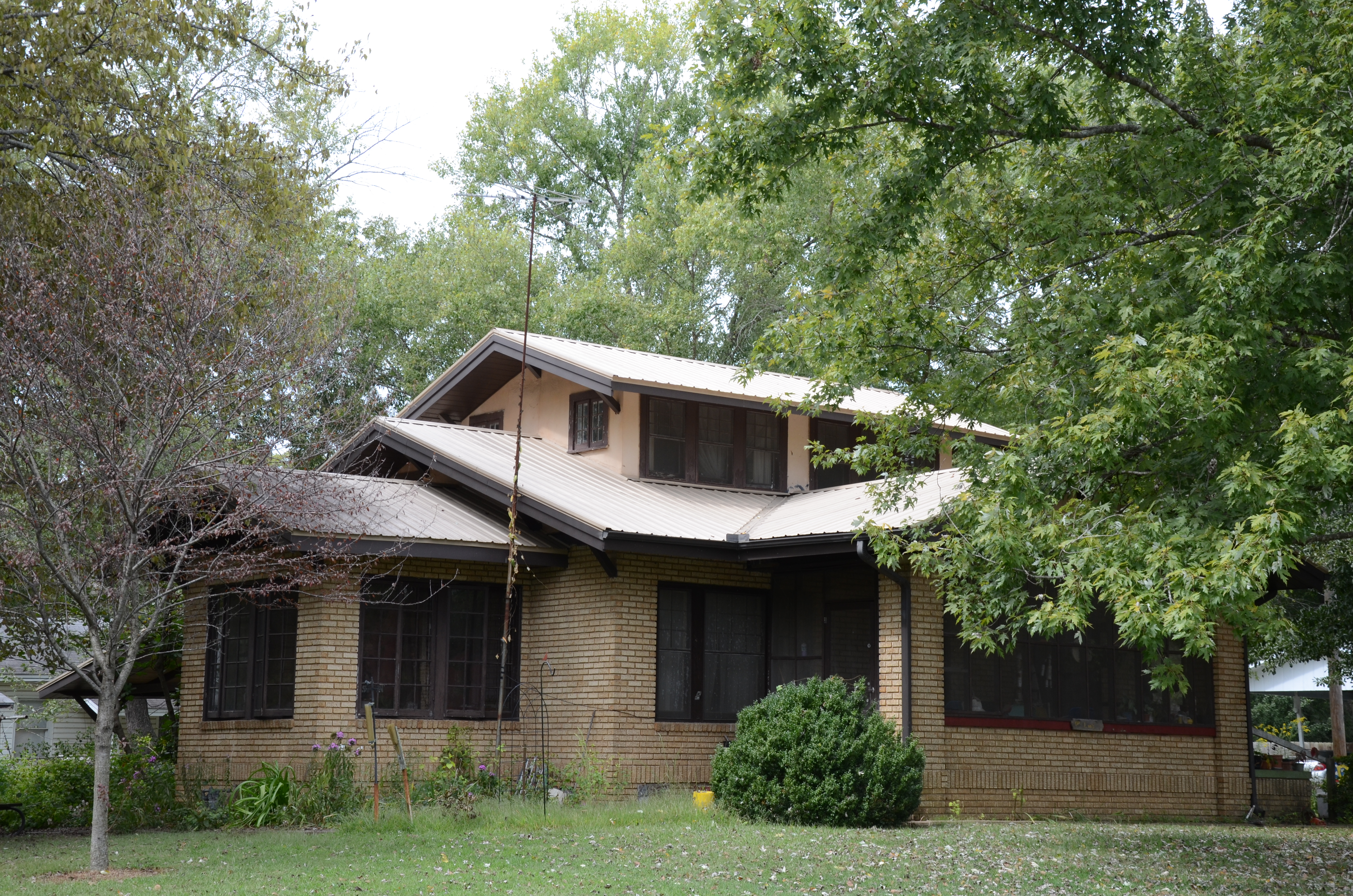

- Location within Arkansas Location within the United States
- Location: Jct. of Main and Adams Sts., Judsonia, Arkansas
- Coordinates: 35°16′12″N 91°38′27″W
- Area: less than one acre
- Built: 1925
- Built by: C.D. Kelly
- Architectural style: Bungalow/craftsman
- MPS: White County MPS
- NRHP reference No.: 91001190
- Added to NRHP: September 5, 1991

The C.D. Kelly House is a historic house at Main and Adams Streets in Judsonia, Arkansas. It is a 1 1/2-story brick structure with Craftsman styling. It has a gabled roof, with a central projecting half-story that is also gabled. Gabled projections extend in several directions from the main block, with all of the gables and eaves exhibiting exposed rafters and large supporting brackets. Built about 1925, it is the city's finest example of the Craftsman style in brick.

The house was listed on the National Register of Historic Places in 1991.

== See also ==
- National Register of Historic Places listings in White County, Arkansas
