= Kelley House (Dubuque, Iowa) =

Historic house in Iowa, United States

- U.S. National Register of Historic Places
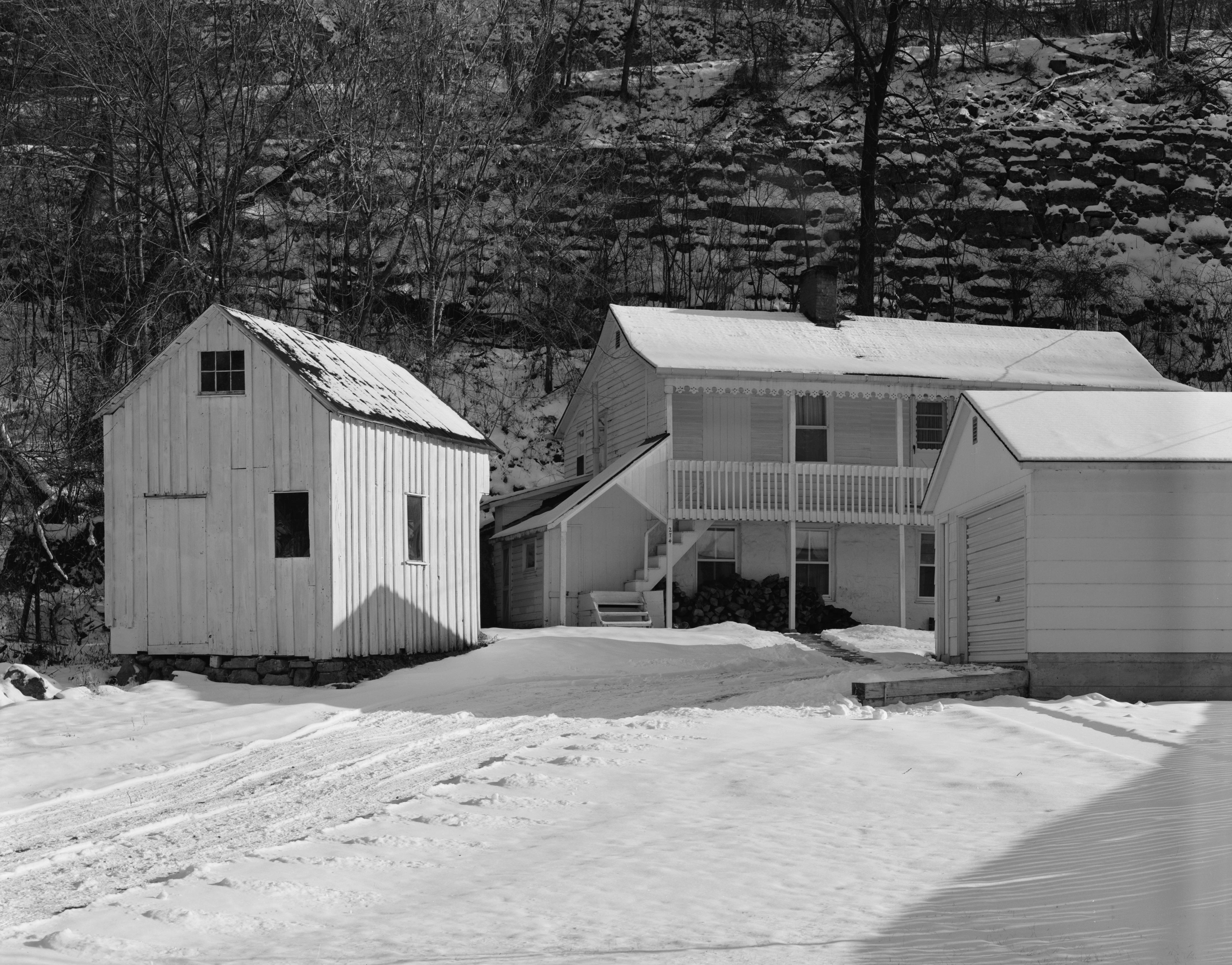

- Location within Iowa Location within the United States
- Location: 274 Southern Ave. Dubuque, Iowa
- Coordinates: 42°28′59.5″N 90°40′00″W
- Area: less than one acre
- Built: c. 1855
- Built by: John Kelley
- NRHP reference No.: 78001217
- Added to NRHP: January 30, 1978

The Kelley House is a historic building located in Dubuque, Iowa, United States. John and Mary Kelley bought this property from James Fanning in 1855. Kelley built this two-story structure, which is a rare example of Mississippi Valley French Colonial architecture in Iowa. While Kelley was not of French ancestry, the Dubuque area was initially settled by French Canadians. However, this house, completed by 1858, was completed well after the French influence in the area. It is also an example of the French style from the Southern United States and the Caribbean. Typical of this style is the full-length galerie, or porch, with an exterior staircase, and the main living quarters located above a full-height ground floor level. Both of these elements are found in the Kelley house. It was listed on the National Register of Historic Places in 1978. It was demolished sometime prior to 2001.
