= Alma Staker House =

- U.S. National Register of Historic Places
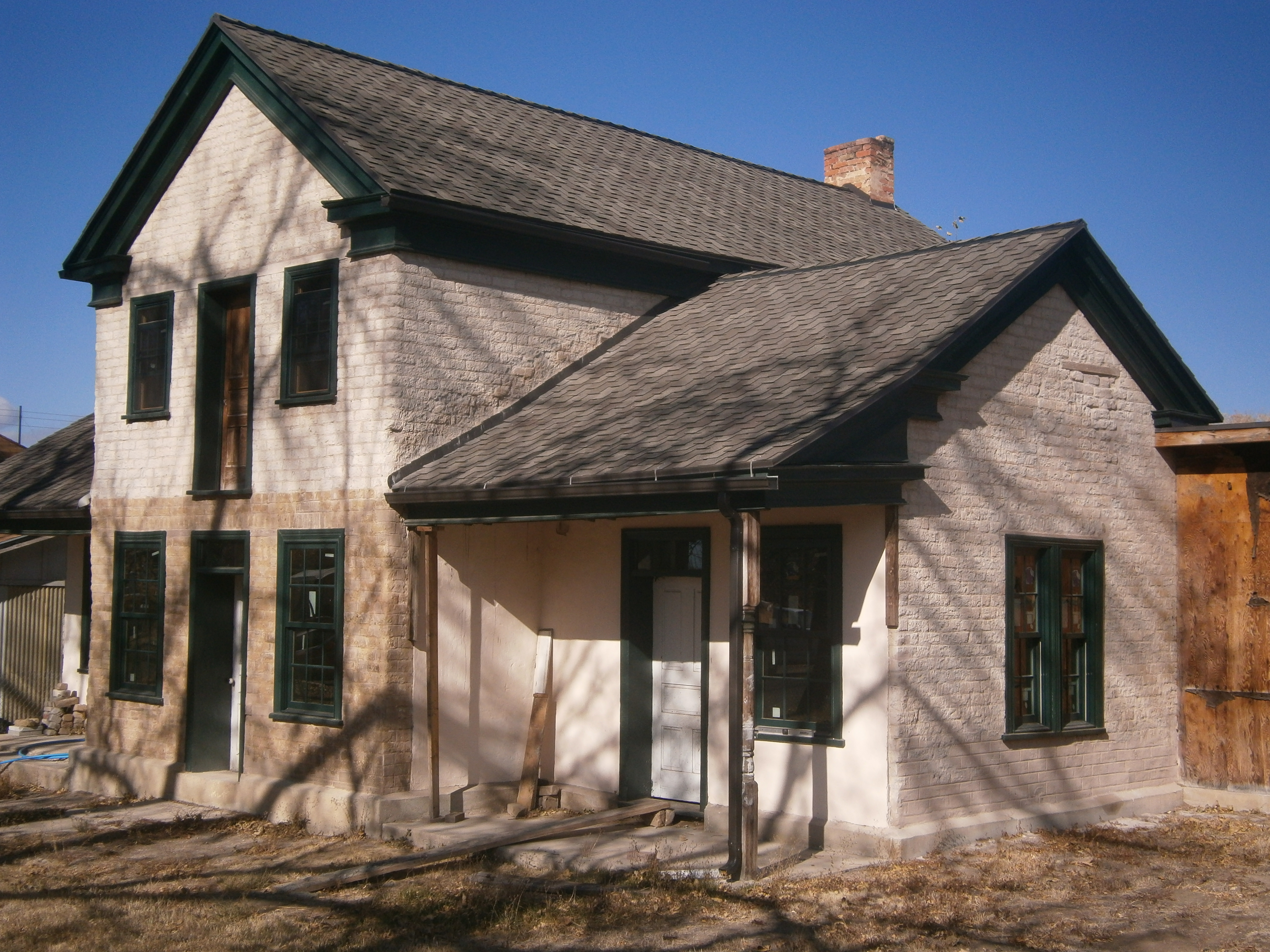

- Location within Utah
- Location: 81 E. 300 South, Mount Pleasant, Utah
- Coordinates: 39.542626°N 111.453814°W
- Area: less than one acre
- Built: c.1870
- Architectural style: Greek Revival, vernacular
- NRHP reference No.: 79002509
- Added to NRHP: July 9, 1979

The Alma Staker House, at 81 E. 300 South in Mount Pleasant, Utah, was built around 1870 and listed on the National Register of Historic Places in 1979.

It illustrates "syncretism", i.e. the synthesis of Eastern style, with Western materials. It is an adobe house with vernacular Greek Revival style. It has a "temple-form" or "up-right and wing" house plan, i.e. a one-and-a-half-story gabled central unit, one room wide and two deep, flanked by smaller one-story wings.
