= T. R. Kelly House =

Historic house in Utah, United States

- U.S. National Register of Historic Places
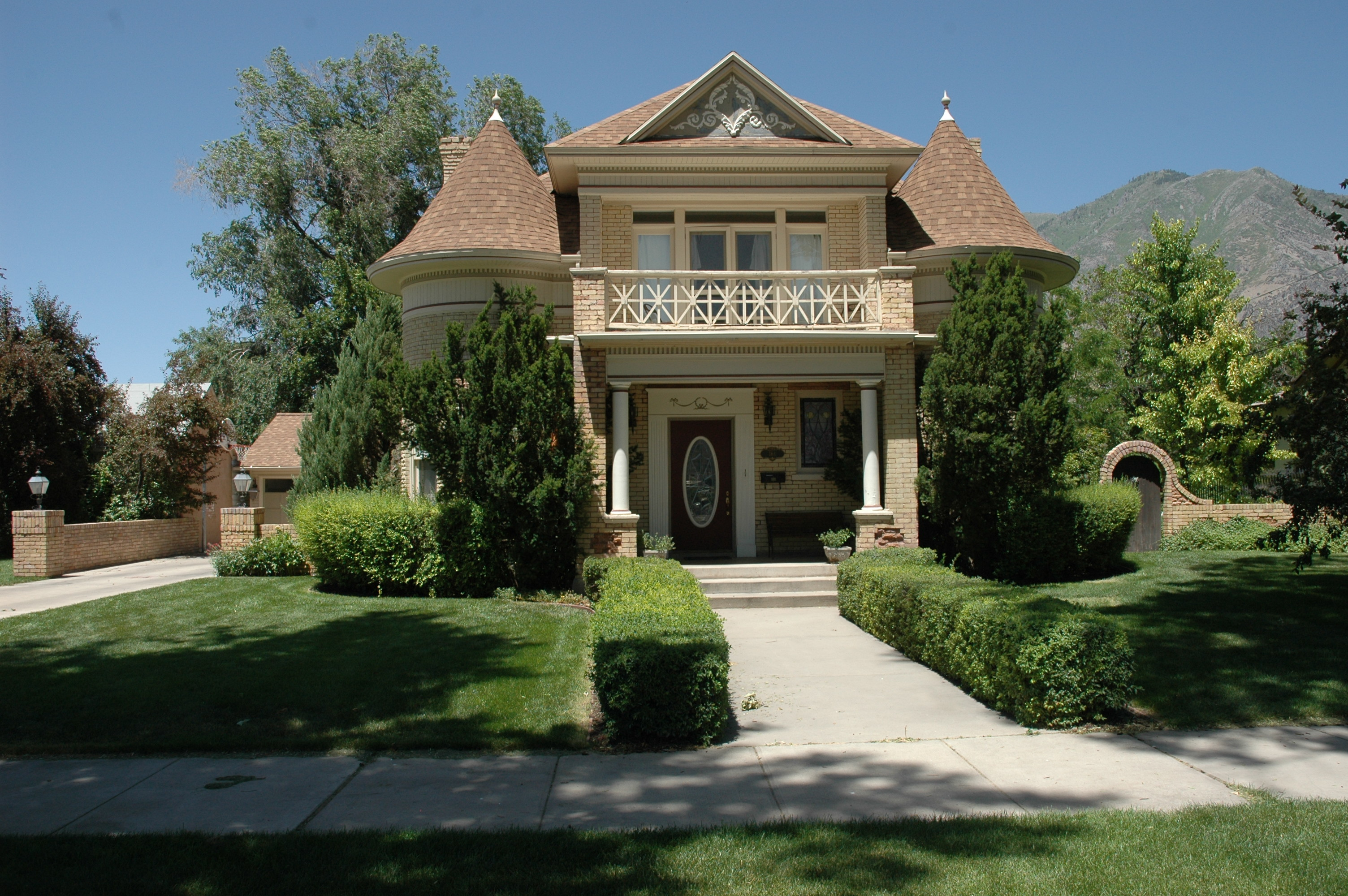
- T.R. Kelly House, June 2012

- Location within Utah Location within the United States
- Location: 164 West 200 South; Springville, Utah; United States
- Coordinates: 40°9′51″N 111°36′46″W
- Area: less than one acre
- Built: 1903
- Architectural style: Gothic
- NRHP reference No.: 83003972
- Added to NRHP: December 9, 1983

The T. R. Kelly House is a historic house within the Springville Historic District in Springville, Utah, United States, that is individually listed on the National Register of Historic Places (NRHP).

== Description ==
The house is located at 164 West 200 South and was built in 1903. According to architectural historian Deborah R. Temme, writing the NRHP nomination:

The Kelly House, because on the one hand it reflects the popular trend of the time, the use of books for house designs, and on the other hand, because it is a unique type among the types that were built and repeated, reflects the owner's desire to be up to date according to the method of design, but also expresses his concurrent wish to have a house that would stand apart from others and express his own individuality.

It was listed on the NRHP December 9, 1993.

== See also ==
- National Register of Historic Places in Utah County, Utah
