= J. Nelson Kelly House =

Historic house in North Dakota, United States

- U.S. National Register of Historic Places
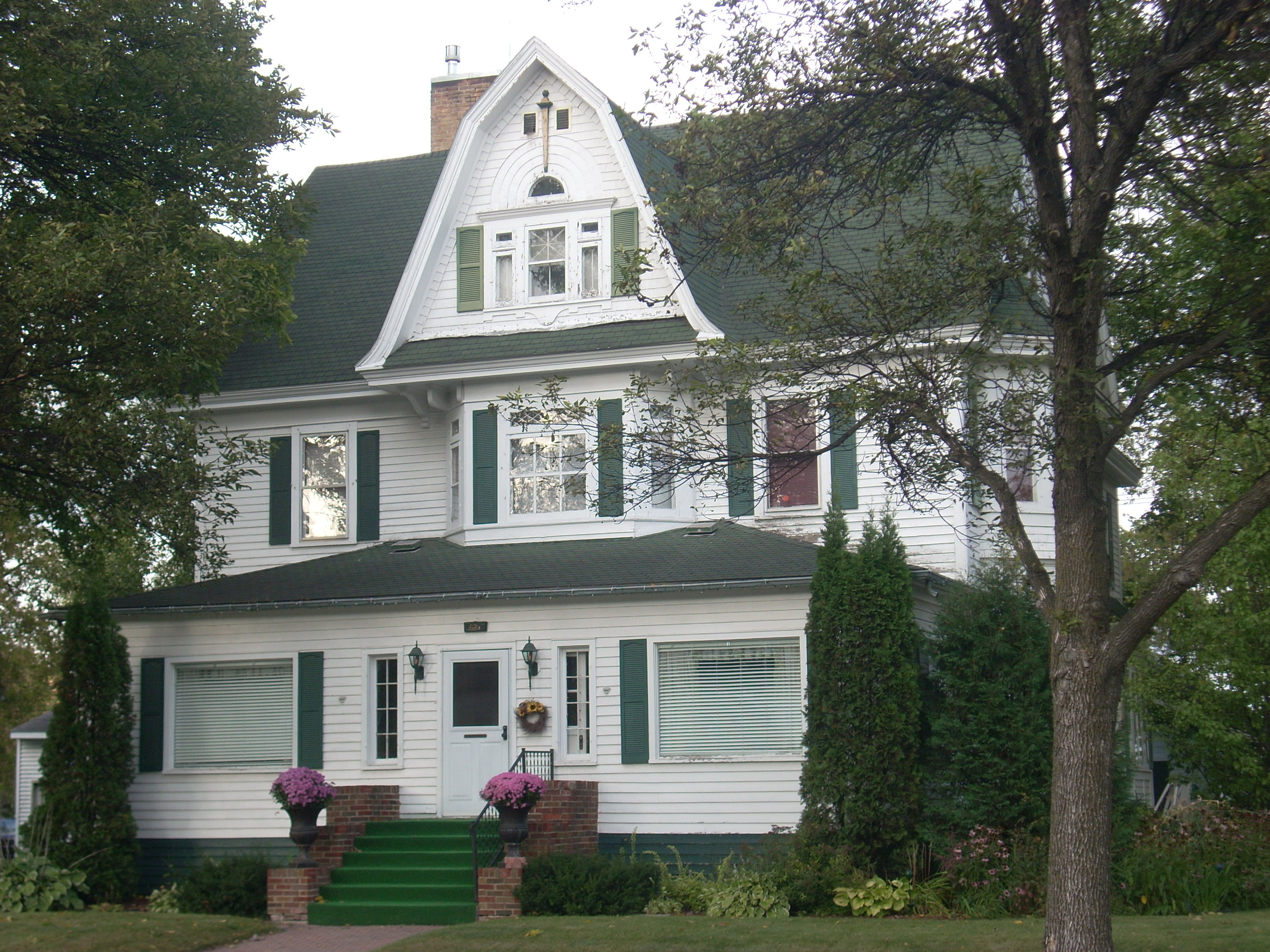
- House in 2009

- Location within North Dakota Location within the United States
- Location: 521 S. 5th St., Grand Forks, North Dakota
- Coordinates: 47°55′10″N 97°1′28″W
- Area: less than 1 acre (0.40 ha)
- Built: 1897
- Architect: Barber, George F. & Co.; Turner, A. F.
- Architectural style: Colonial Revival and Queen Anne
- NRHP reference No.: 94000058
- Added to NRHP: February 18, 1994

The J. Nelson Kelly House is a building in Grand Forks, North Dakota that was listed on the National Register of Historic Places in 1994. The property is also known as Lord Byron's Bed and Breakfast and denoted as 32 GF 1387. It was built or has other significance in 1897. When listed the property included the house as the one contributing building and also one non-contributing building, which is a relatively modern garage.

== History ==
It was built from a catalog design and was the home of James Nelson Kelly (1858 - 1934) who was the first superintendent of Grand Forks high school (1894-1919). It was designed by George Franklin Barber (1854–1915) and was built by A. F. Turner. It includes Colonial Revival and Queen Anne architecture.

== Related reading ==
- Clement A. Lounsberry (1917) North Dakota History and People, Volume III (S. J. Clarke Publishing Company, Chicago)
