= Kelley–Fredrickson House and Office Building =

Historic house in Indiana, United States

- U.S. National Register of Historic Places
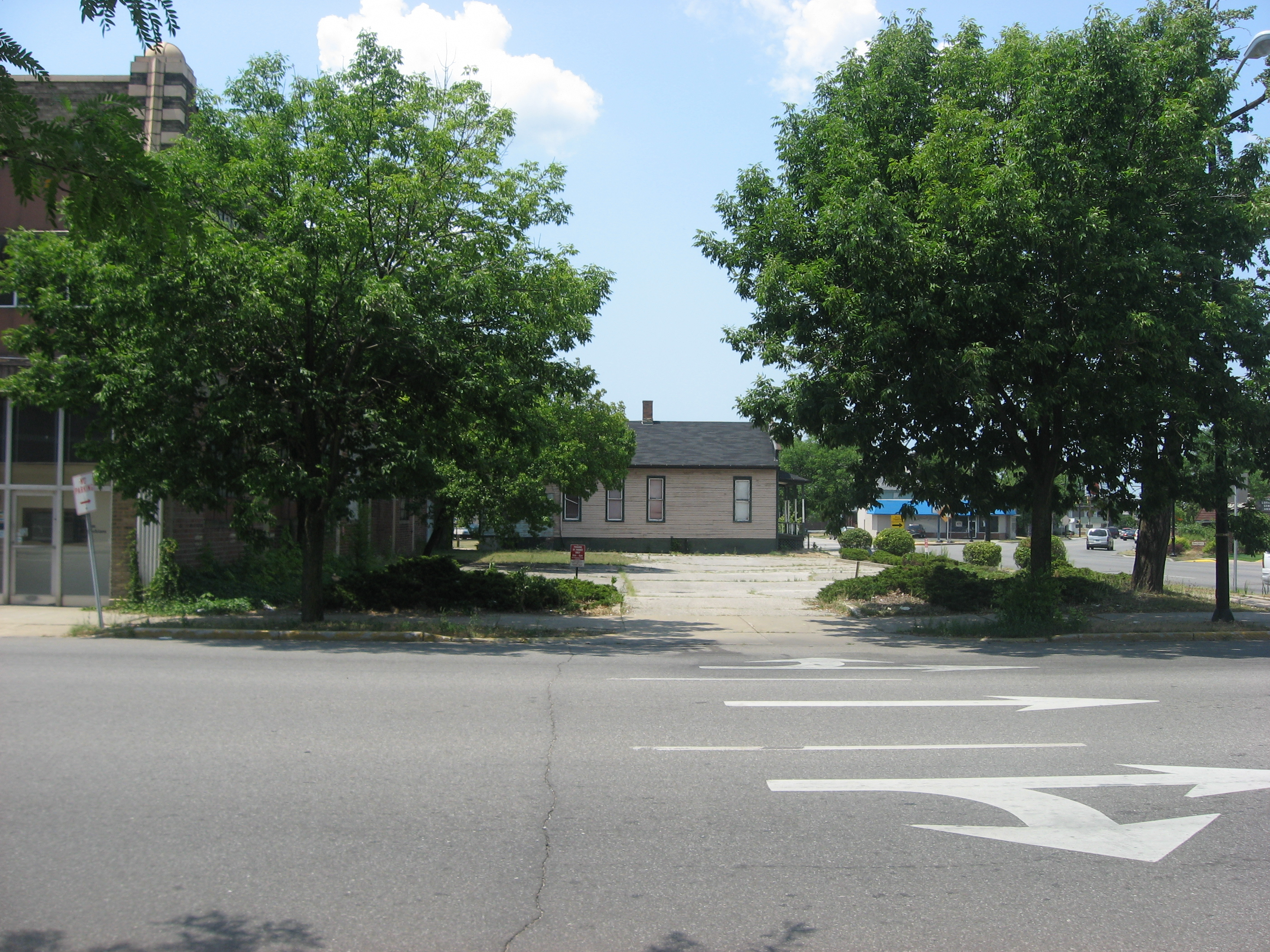
- Kelley–Fredrickson House and Office Building site, July 2012

- Location within Indiana
- Location: 233 N. Lafayette Blvd. and 314 W. LaSalle St., South Bend, Indiana
- Coordinates: 41°40′44″N 86°15′13″W
- Area: less than one acre
- Built: 1892
- Architectural style: Stick/eastlake, Queen Anne
- NRHP reference No.: 84001619
- Added to NRHP: May 24, 1984

Kelley–Fredrickson House and Office Building, also known as the Arthur Fredrickson House and Candy Store, is a historic home and commercial building located at South Bend, Indiana. The house was built in 1892, and is a 2 1/2-story, irregular plan, Queen Anne style frame dwelling. Two additions were constructed between 1898 and 1917. It features a polygonal corner tower with a conical roof multiple porches with Stick Style ornamentation, bay and oriel windows, and a variety of decorative siding elements. The office / store was built in 1892, and is a 1 1/2-story wood-frame building on a brick foundation. The house was moved to 702 W. Colfax in 1986 and is operated as a bed and breakfast.

It was listed on the National Register of Historic Places in 1984.
