= Ormsby-Kelly House =

Historic house in Iowa, United States

- U.S. National Register of Historic Places
- Location within Iowa Location within the United States
- Location: 2403 W. 7th St. Emmetsburg, Iowa
- Coordinates: 43°06′50″N 94°40′54″W
- Area: less than one acre
- Built: 1876
- Architectural style: Italianate
- NRHP reference No.: 77000545
- Added to NRHP: July 29, 1977

The Ormsby-Kelly House is a historic residence located in Emmetsburg, Iowa, United States. The house was built for A.L. Ormsby who was a local banker who also had significant land holdings in Iowa and Canada. It is also associated with Bruce Bliven, who was a journalist who worked for the San Francisco Bulletin, the New York Globe and the Manchester Guardian before he became the editor of The New Republic. His mother was Ormsby's sister, and Bliven was born here in 1899 when the family was visiting. The family later bought their own house in town. The house is a two-story, brick Italianate structure. The main block was completed in 1876, and Ormsby built two additions onto the house in 1890. The house was listed on the National Register of Historic Places in 1977.
