= Eugene V. Kelly Carriage House =

- U.S. National Register of Historic Places
- New Jersey Register of Historic Places
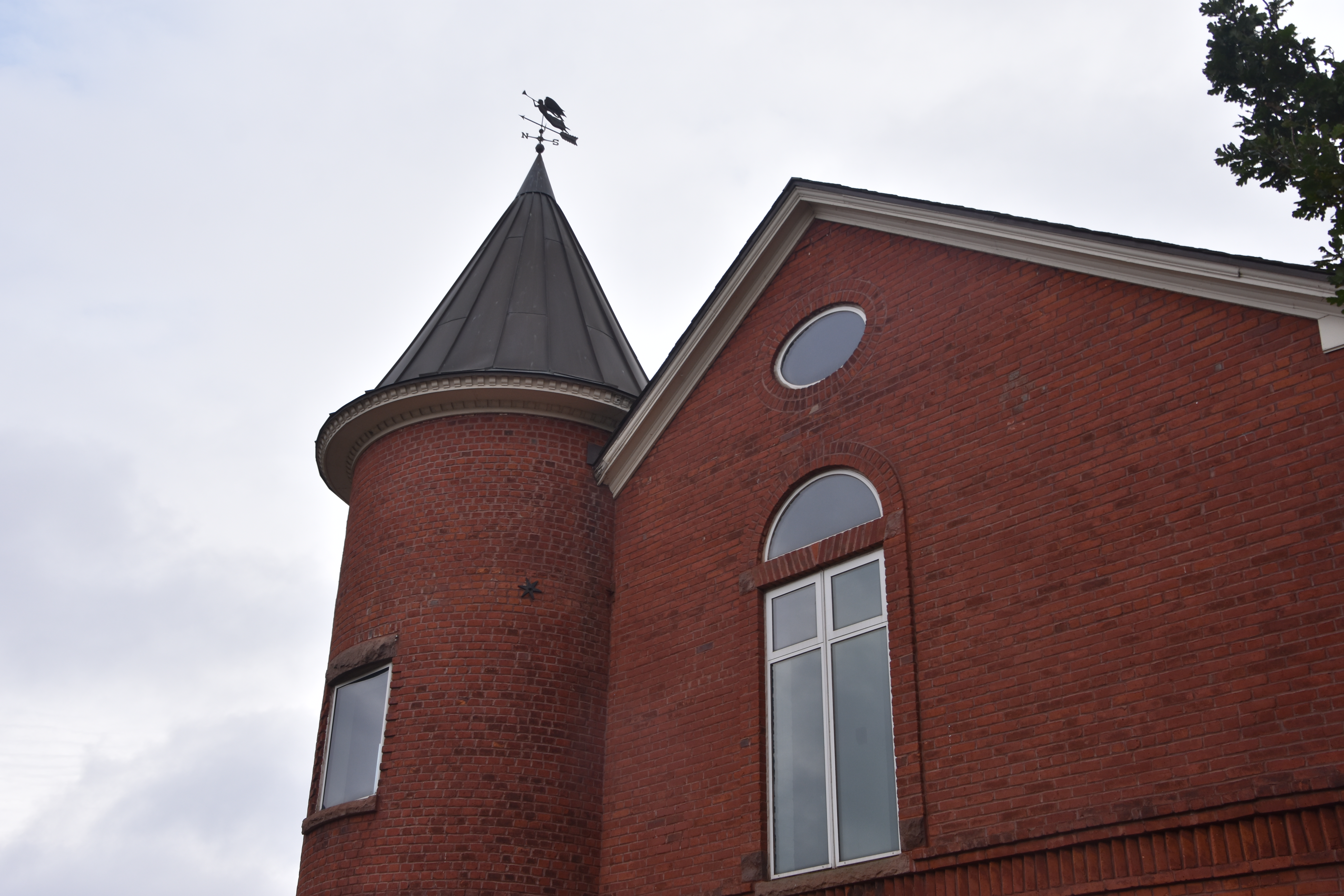
- Eugene V. Kelly Carriage House

- Location within Essex County, New Jersey Location within New Jersey Location within the United States
- Location: S. Orange Avenue, Seton Hall University campus, South Orange, New Jersey
- Coordinates: 40°44′40″N 74°14′38″W
- Area: 5 acres (2.0 ha)
- Built: 1887
- Architects: Baker, John E.
- Architectural style: Late Victorian
- NRHP reference No.: 75001136
- NJRHP No.: 1360

Significant dates
- Added to NRHP: November 10, 1975
- Designated NJRHP: October 3, 1980

The Eugene V. Kelly Carriage House, also known as Father Vincent Monella Art Center, is located on the campus of Seton Hall University in South Orange, Essex County, New Jersey, United States. It was built in 1887 and was listed on the National Register of Historic Places in 1975. It includes Late Victorian architecture and is listed for its meeting architectural criteria. The listed area is 5 acres (2.0 ha) and includes just the one contributing building.
