= Albert H. Kelly House =

Historic house in Salt Lake City, Utah, U.S.

- U.S. National Register of Historic Places
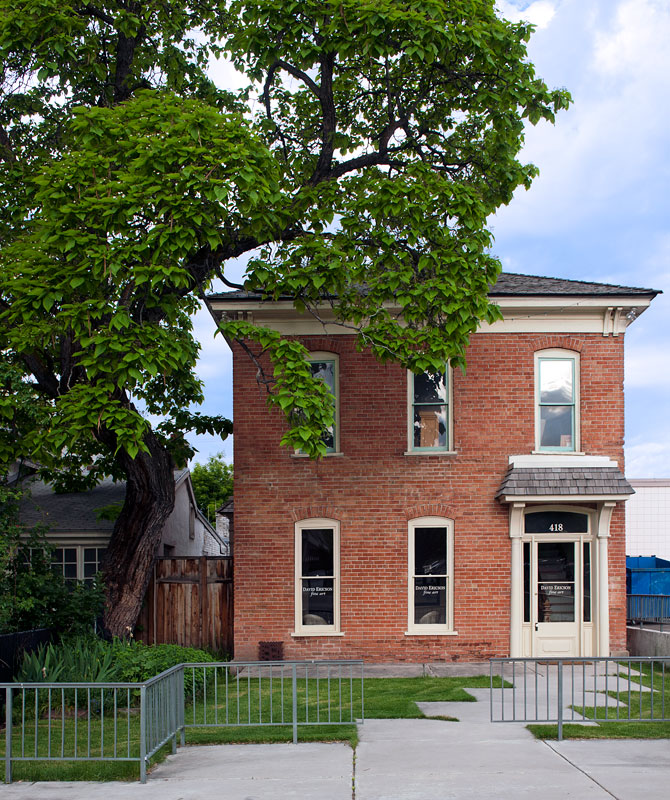

- Location within Utah Location within the United States
- Location: 418 S. 200 West, Salt Lake City, Utah
- Coordinates: 40°45′36″N 111°53′49″W
- Area: less than one acre
- Built: 1884 (demolished 2021)
- Architectural style: Italianate
- NRHP reference No.: 83004420
- Added to NRHP: July 20, 1983

The Albert H. Kelly House, at 418 South 200 West in Salt Lake City, Utah, was an Italianate house that was built in 1884 and demolished in the spring of 2021 to make way for an apartment complex. It was listed on the National Register of Historic Places in 1983.

In 1983, its NRHP nomination asserted it to be "the best extant example in Utah of the vernacular form of the Italianate style which appeared in increasing numbers from the 1870s to the 1890s."
