= Sheridan, Arkansas =

- City
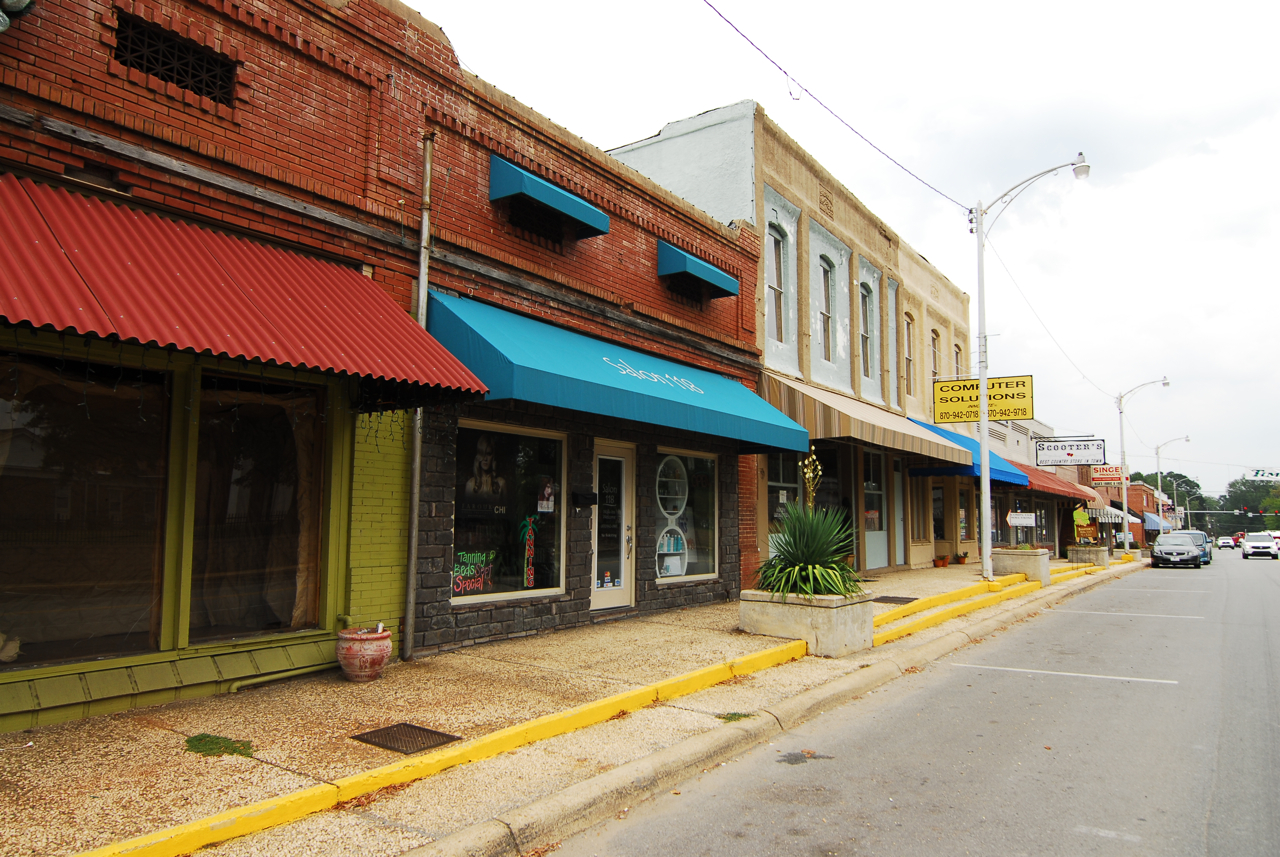
- Downtown Sheridan

- Flag

- Location in Grant County and Arkansas

- Location in the United States
- Coordinates: 34°15′31″N 92°25′22″W
- Country: United States
- State: Arkansas
- County: Grant
- Townships: Calvert, Merry Green
- Founded: January 23, 1870
- Incorporated: August 26, 1887
- Named for: Philip Sheridan

Government
  - Type: Mayor–Council
  - Mayor: Cain W. Nattin (I)
  - Clerk/Treasurer: Carrie Smith
  - Council: Sheridan City Council

Area
  - Total: 12.20 sq mi (31.59 km^{2})
  - Land: 12.19 sq mi (31.58 km^{2})
  - Water: 0.0039 sq mi (0.01 km^{2})
- Elevation: 276 ft (84 m)

Population (2020)
  - Total: 5,011
  - Estimate (2025): 5,406 ▲
  - Density: 403.5/sq mi (155.78/km^{2})
- Time zone: UTC−6 (CST)
  - Summer (DST): UTC−5 (CDT)
- ZIP code: 72150
- Area code: 870
- FIPS code: 05-63710
- GNIS feature ID: 2405459
- Major airport: Clinton National (LIT)
- Website: www.cityofsheridanar.gov

Sheridan, officially the City of Sheridan, is a city in and the county seat of Grant County, Arkansas, United States. The community is located deep in the forests of the Arkansas Timberlands. It sits at the intersection of U.S. highways 167 and 270.

Early settlers were drawn to the area by the native timber, which is still a very important part of Sheridan's economy, although the city has diversified into several other industries. The city's history also includes a college, Missionary Baptist College, until its closure in 1934, and a series of conflicts during the Civil Rights Movement.

Located at the southern end of the Central Arkansas region, Sheridan has been experiencing a population boom in recent years, as indicated by a 49% growth in population between the 1990 and 2010 censuses. As of the 2020 census, Sheridan had a population of 4,920.

== History ==
=== Indigenous peoples, pioneers and Trail of Tears ===
What is now Sheridan was formerly part of the historical territories of the Quapaw Nation. After the Indian Removal Act of 1830, the Quapaw were removed from the land and pushed further west. By 1833 most had been removed to the Indian Territory and the land was ceded to the United States. The first recorded Anglo-American settler was Dr. Richard C. Rhodes, a native of North Carolina.

=== Founding and the early 20th century (1870–1941) ===
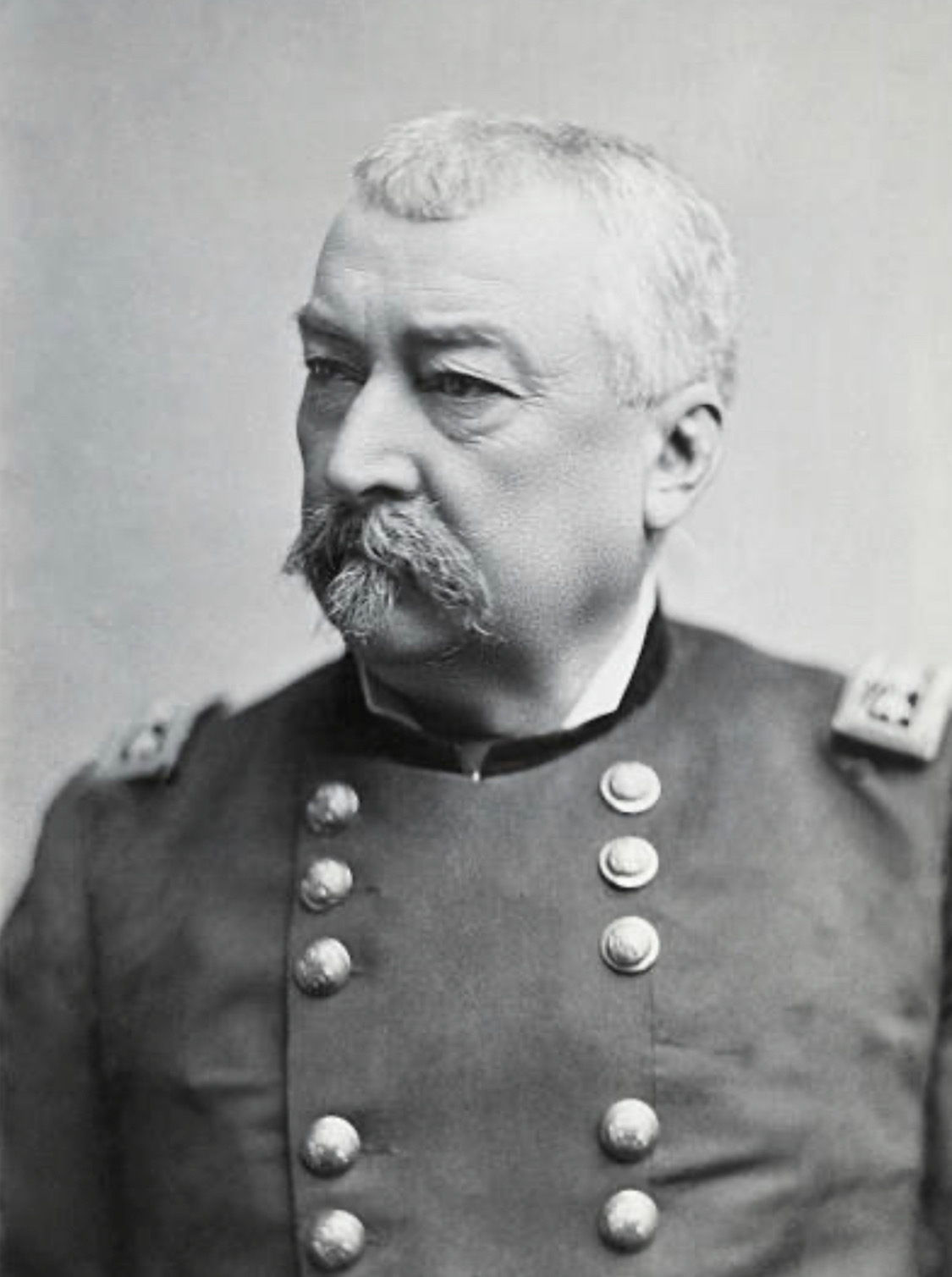
U.S. Army Lieutenant General Philip Sheridan, for whom the city is named.

Founded on January 23, 1870, Sheridan was incorporated as a municipality by the Grant County Quorum Court on August 26, 1887. Lieutenant-General Philip Sheridan, for whom the city is named, served as the eighth commanding general of the U.S. Army from 1883 until his death in 1888. At the beginning of the 20th century, a railroad passed through Sheridan south into Dallas County. Owned by E. S. McCarty, it transported both freight and passengers for hire.

Sheridan was home to Missionary Baptist College, a landmark baptist educational institution from 1917 until 1934 when it was forced to close due to financial circumstances resulting from the Great Depression. A 1920 bulletin published by the college underscored its goal "to teach and emphasize the very principles for which the real Baptists of Arkansas stand and for which true Baptists have stood for almost nineteen centuries." The Missionary Baptist Seminary was established by Little Rock's Antioch Baptist Church in September 1934 to succeed the Missionary Baptist College after its closure.

=== World War II and the Cold War (1941–1991) ===
In 1943, Jewell Williams, a Jehovah's Witness, was convicted in the Mayor's Court for selling Bibles without a permit under Sheridan City Ord. No. 50. and fined $10. On a trial de novo, he obtained the same result. Williams joined other members of his faith and appealed similar convictions occurring across the state to the Arkansas Supreme Court in Berry v. City of Hope, challenging the city ordinance as unconstitutional under the First Amendment. The court agreed and held the ordinances unconstitutional.

The "Mighty 1090" KAAY radio station sponsored the Rebel Springs Rock Festival of 1973 5 miles (8 km) east of Sheridan on Highway 270 that included ZZ Top as a headliner. Tickets were $4 before the show and lasted three days, July 4–6, 1973. The National Guard was sent out to maintain "peace". Local property owners attempted to get a court-ordered injunction to halt the festival from talking place, on the legal theory of nuisance, but to no avail.

In 1954, Sheridan's school board voted to comply with the Supreme Court's decision in Brown v. Board of Education. Sheridan had operated an elementary school for Black children and bused its Black high school students to schools in other counties The protests were so severe that the school board reversed itself the following night. Then, local sawmill owner Jack Williams told his Black employees that they could accept his offer to buy out their homes and give them to the employees, and all move 25 miles west to the town of Malvern. Black residents had no choice, for Williams told them that "if a family refused to move, he would evict them and burn down their home." This left Sheridan as a sundown town, and instead of becoming "one of the most racially progressive towns in Arkansas if its initial school board decision had stood, instead became one of its most backward." Loewen's research describes the fact that "no Sheridan resident lifted a voice to protest the forced buyout of its black community" and a "reputation for bigotry when their high school played interracial teams in athletic contests."

== Geography ==
=== Climate ===
Climate data for Sheridan, Arkansas (1991–2020 normals, extremes 1977–present)
Month	Jan	Feb	Mar	Apr	May	Jun	Jul	Aug	Sep	Oct	Nov	Dec	Year
Record high °F (°C)	80 (27)	86 (30)	91 (33)	96 (36)	97 (36)	104 (40)	108 (42)	107 (42)	108 (42)	97 (36)	86 (30)	79 (26)	108 (42)
Mean maximum °F (°C)	71.2 (21.8)	75.4 (24.1)	82.7 (28.2)	87.3 (30.7)	91.1 (32.8)	95.5 (35.3)	99.5 (37.5)	100.0 (37.8)	95.8 (35.4)	89.4 (31.9)	79.4 (26.3)	72.8 (22.7)	101.0 (38.3)
Mean daily maximum °F (°C)	51.3 (10.7)	56.5 (13.6)	65.2 (18.4)	74.1 (23.4)	81.2 (27.3)	88.4 (31.3)	92.0 (33.3)	91.5 (33.1)	85.7 (29.8)	75.0 (23.9)	62.7 (17.1)	53.5 (11.9)	73.1 (22.8)
Daily mean °F (°C)	40.2 (4.6)	44.5 (6.9)	52.3 (11.3)	61.0 (16.1)	69.6 (20.9)	77.4 (25.2)	81.0 (27.2)	80.2 (26.8)	73.6 (23.1)	61.9 (16.6)	50.5 (10.3)	42.8 (6.0)	61.2 (16.2)
Mean daily minimum °F (°C)	29.2 (−1.6)	32.5 (0.3)	39.4 (4.1)	47.8 (8.8)	58.0 (14.4)	66.5 (19.2)	70.0 (21.1)	68.8 (20.4)	61.5 (16.4)	48.8 (9.3)	38.4 (3.6)	32.1 (0.1)	49.4 (9.7)
Mean minimum °F (°C)	14.9 (−9.5)	19.4 (−7.0)	24.1 (−4.4)	33.3 (0.7)	44.5 (6.9)	57.1 (13.9)	63.3 (17.4)	61.4 (16.3)	47.9 (8.8)	33.7 (0.9)	23.7 (−4.6)	19.1 (−7.2)	13.1 (−10.5)
Record low °F (°C)	−3 (−19)	0 (−18)	13 (−11)	26 (−3)	34 (1)	45 (7)	55 (13)	48 (9)	37 (3)	25 (−4)	14 (−10)	−8 (−22)	−8 (−22)
Average precipitation inches (mm)	4.05 (103)	4.32 (110)	5.61 (142)	5.94 (151)	5.71 (145)	4.17 (106)	4.30 (109)	2.88 (73)	3.57 (91)	4.56 (116)	4.61 (117)	5.49 (139)	55.21 (1,402)
Average snowfall inches (cm)	1.2 (3.0)	0.9 (2.3)	0.4 (1.0)	0.0 (0.0)	0.0 (0.0)	0.0 (0.0)	0.0 (0.0)	0.0 (0.0)	0.0 (0.0)	0.0 (0.0)	0.0 (0.0)	0.0 (0.0)	2.5 (6.4)
Average precipitation days (≥ 0.01 in)	7.6	7.4	8.4	7.5	8.0	6.6	6.9	5.2	5.1	6.0	6.8	7.3	82.8
Average snowy days (≥ 0.1 in)	0.4	0.5	0.1	0.0	0.0	0.0	0.0	0.0	0.0	0.0	0.1	0.1	1.2
Source: NOAA

== Demographics ==
Historical population
Census	Pop.	Note	%±
1880	42		—
1890	184		338.1%
1900	210		14.1%
1910	481		129.0%
1920	695		44.5%
1930	1,590		128.8%
1940	1,338		−15.8%
1950	1,893		41.5%
1960	1,938		2.4%
1970	2,480		28.0%
1980	3,042		22.7%
1990	3,098		1.8%
2000	3,872		25.0%
2010	4,603		18.9%
2020	4,920		6.9%
2024 (est.)	5,406	▲	9.9%
U.S. Decennial Census

Sheridan is part of the Little Rock-North Little Rock-Conway metropolitan area.

=== Demographic estimates ===
In 2023, the City of Sheridan, Arkansas successfully completed a formal population estimate appeal with the U.S. Census Bureau. The appeal resulted in an official increase to the city’s population estimate, reflecting more accurate local growth and development.

The revised population figures are expected to increase the city’s eligibility for state and federal funding programs, many of which are allocated based on population thresholds. According to the Arkansas Department of Finance and Administration, the adjustment represents a significant milestone for Sheridan and is anticipated to support future infrastructure, transportation, and community development projects.

City officials noted that the appeal process required detailed documentation to demonstrate that prior estimates undercounted the city’s actual population. The successful revision reflects ongoing growth in Sheridan and its expanding role within the Central Arkansas region.

An increase of 91 residents was recognized through the appeal, raising Sheridan’s official population from 4,920 to 5,011 and surpassing the 5,000-resident threshold. Crossing this benchmark is considered significant, as it allows the city to qualify for additional state funding and resources tied to population-based eligibility requirements. Local officials indicated that the updated count more accurately reflects Sheridan’s recent growth and positions the city for expanded economic and infrastructure opportunities.

=== 2020 census ===
As of the 2020 census, Sheridan had a population of 4,920. The median age was 37.7 years. 23.7% of residents were under the age of 18 and 17.7% were 65 years of age or older. For every 100 females, there were 92.7 males, and for every 100 females age 18 and over, there were 89.9 males age 18 and over.

92.7% of residents lived in urban areas, while 7.3% lived in rural areas.

There were 1,960 households in Sheridan, including 1,235 family households. Among family households, 45.5% were married-couple households, 17.7% had a male householder with no spouse or partner present, and 30.9% had a female householder with no spouse or partner present. About 30.2% of all households were made up of individuals, and 15.1% had someone living alone who was 65 years of age or older.

There were 2,186 housing units, of which 10.3% were vacant. The homeowner vacancy rate was 1.6% and the rental vacancy rate was 11.9%.

Sheridan racial composition
Race	Number	Percentage
White (non-Hispanic)	4,323	87.87%
Black or African American (non-Hispanic)	157	3.19%
Native American	25	0.51%
Asian	48	0.98%
Pacific Islander	1	0.02%
Other/Mixed	228	4.63%
Hispanic or Latino	138	2.8%

=== 2010 census ===
As of the 2010 United States census, there were 4,603 people, 1,841 households, and 1,238 families residing in the city. The population density was 1,150.8 inhabitants per square mile (444.3/km^{2}). There were 2,007 housing units at an average density of 501.8 per square mile (193.7/km^{2}). The racial makeup of the city was 95.0% White, 1.6% Black or African American, 0.4% Native American, 0.5% Asian, 1.3% from other races, and 1.2% from two or more races. 2.8% of the population were Hispanic or Latino of any race. There were 1,841 households, out of which 32.7% had children under the age of 18 living with them, 49.0% were married couples living together, 13.2% had a female householder with no husband present, and 31.8% were non-families. 27.5% of all households were made up of individuals, and 12.2% had someone living alone who was 65 years of age or older. The average household size was 2.46 and the average family size was 2.98.

In the city, the population was spread out, with 25.2% under the age of 18, 9.1% from 18 to 24, 33.7% from 25 to 44, 16.9% from 45 to 64, and 15.1% who were 65 years of age or older. The median age was 36.6 years. The gender makeup of the city was 49.6% male and 50.4% female.

The median income for a household in the city was $57,305, and the median income for a family was $64,123. Males had a median income of $46,438 versus $31,580 for females. The per capita income for the city was $23,969. About 3.8% of families and 8.1% of the population were below the poverty line, including 3.8% of those under age 18 and 11.7% of those age 65 or over.

=== 2000 census ===
As of the 2000 United States census, there were 3,872 people, 1,509 households, and 1,050 families residing in the city. The population density was 978.8 inhabitants per square mile (377.9/km^{2}). There were 1,685 housing units at an average density of 426.0 per square mile (164.5/km^{2}). The racial makeup of the city was 97.34% White, 0.96% Black or African American, 0.28% Native American, 0.15% Asian, 0.05% Pacific Islander, 0.57% from other races, and 0.65% from two or more races. 0.96% of the population were Hispanic or Latino of any race. There were 1,509 households, out of which 35.4% had children under the age of 18 living with them, 56.4% were married couples living together, 10.4% had a female householder with no husband present, and 30.4% were non-families. 27.0% of all households were made up of individuals, and 10.9% had someone living alone who was 65 years of age or older. The average household size was 2.49 and the average family size was 3.02.

In the city, the population was spread out, with 26.3% under the age of 18, 8.6% from 18 to 24, 30.6% from 25 to 44, 20.9% from 45 to 64, and 13.6% who were 65 years of age or older. The median age was 35 years. For every 100 females, there were 90.7 males. For every 100 females age 18 and over, there were 91.0 males.

The median income for a household in the city was $37,207, and the median income for a family was $43,953. Males had a median income of $32,216 versus $22,891 for females. The per capita income for the city was $19,184. About 7.0% of families and 9.8% of the population were below the poverty line, including 11.3% of those under age 18 and 17.6% of those age 65 or over.

== Education ==
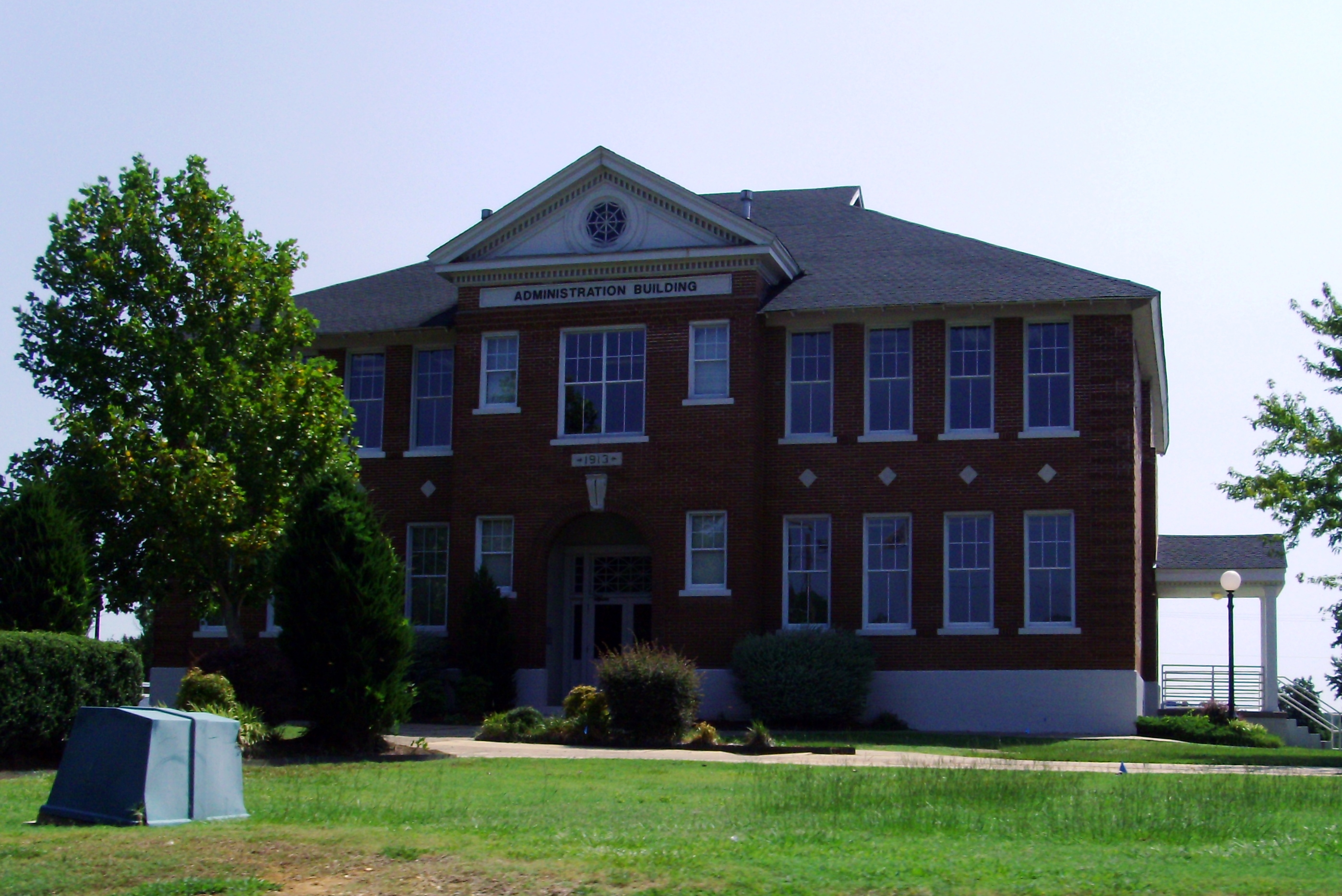
The Sheridan School District Administration Building, formerly the Missionary Baptist College

Sheridan is provided public education from the Sheridan School District, including the Sheridan High School.

Sheridan had a segregated school for African-Americans until the Brown v. Board decision. At the time, Sheridan had around 199 African American residents out of the town's total population of 1,898. On May 21, 1954, the local school board voted unanimously to integrate its 21 African-American students into its high school to avoid the $4,000 it would have cost the school board to send them to Jefferson County. The white parents became upset and called another vote the next night. At that vote, the board voted unanimously to keep the local school segregated. Community members in the area, still not happy, petitioned and forced four school board members to step down.

Next, Jack Williams, the largest employer of African-Americans in the area, told Black families that they could accept his offer to buyout their homes and move them, or he would burn their houses down. After the departure of the last African-American student from the city limits, the city bulldozed the African-American school; the remnants of the school were buried and the city no longer had a duty to integrate their schools. This incident is recounted by former resident James Seawood on storycorps.

In March 2014, Sheridan High School principal Rodney Williams ordered the removal of student profiles from the student yearbook, rather than publish one of an openly gay student. In response, a human rights organization held a rally on the State Capitol steps, and the principal received a petition with 30,000 signatures asking Williams to reverse the decision.

== Arts and culture ==
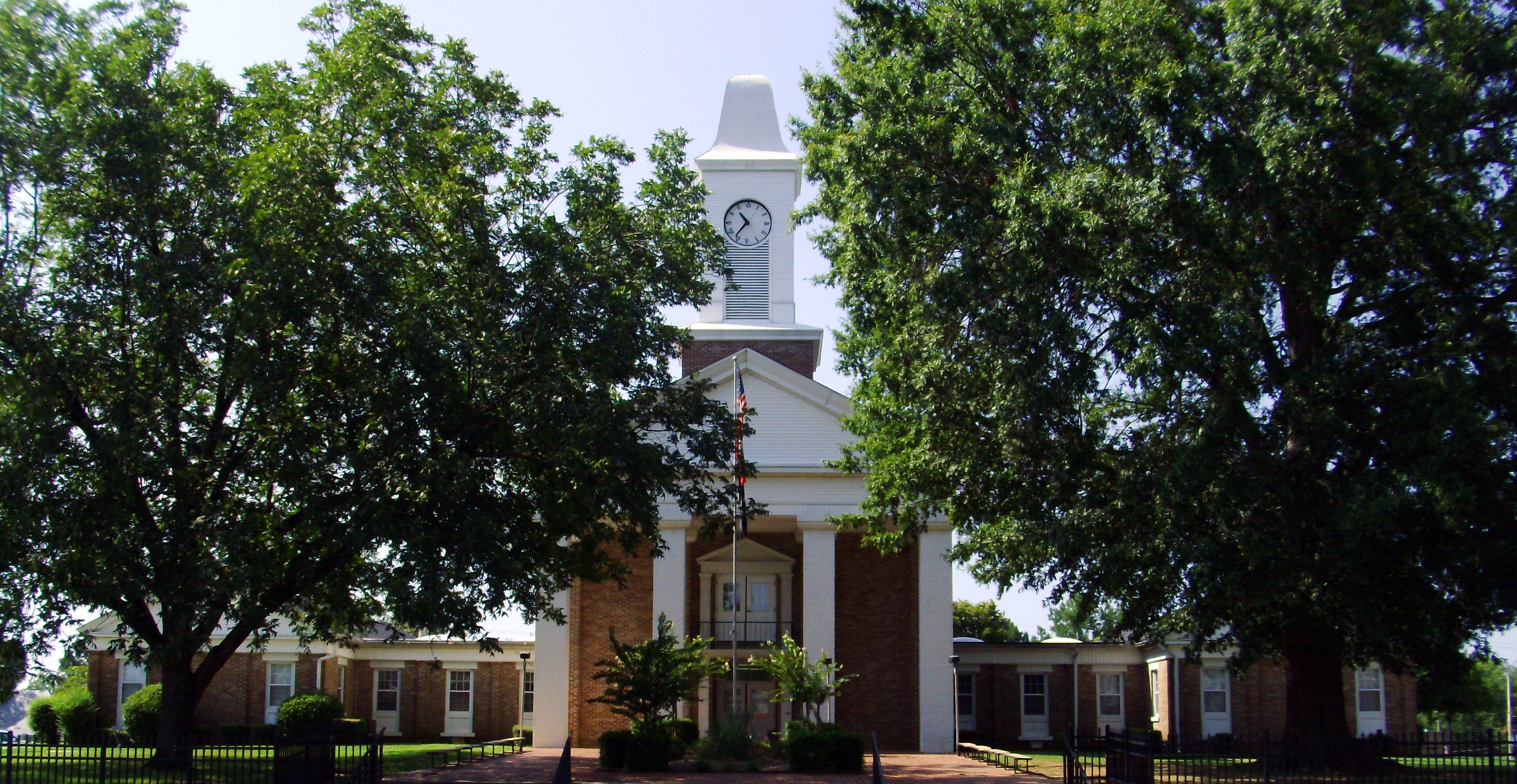
As the seat of county government, Sheridan is home to the Grant County Courthouse.

Sheridan hosts an annual event based on the area's deep roots in the timber industry called Timberfest, which includes a lumberjack competition and live music around the courthouse square. The White River Kid, starring Antonio Banderas and Randy Travis, was filmed during a mock Timberfest during the summer of 1998, with many of the local residents appearing as extras.

=== Tourism ===
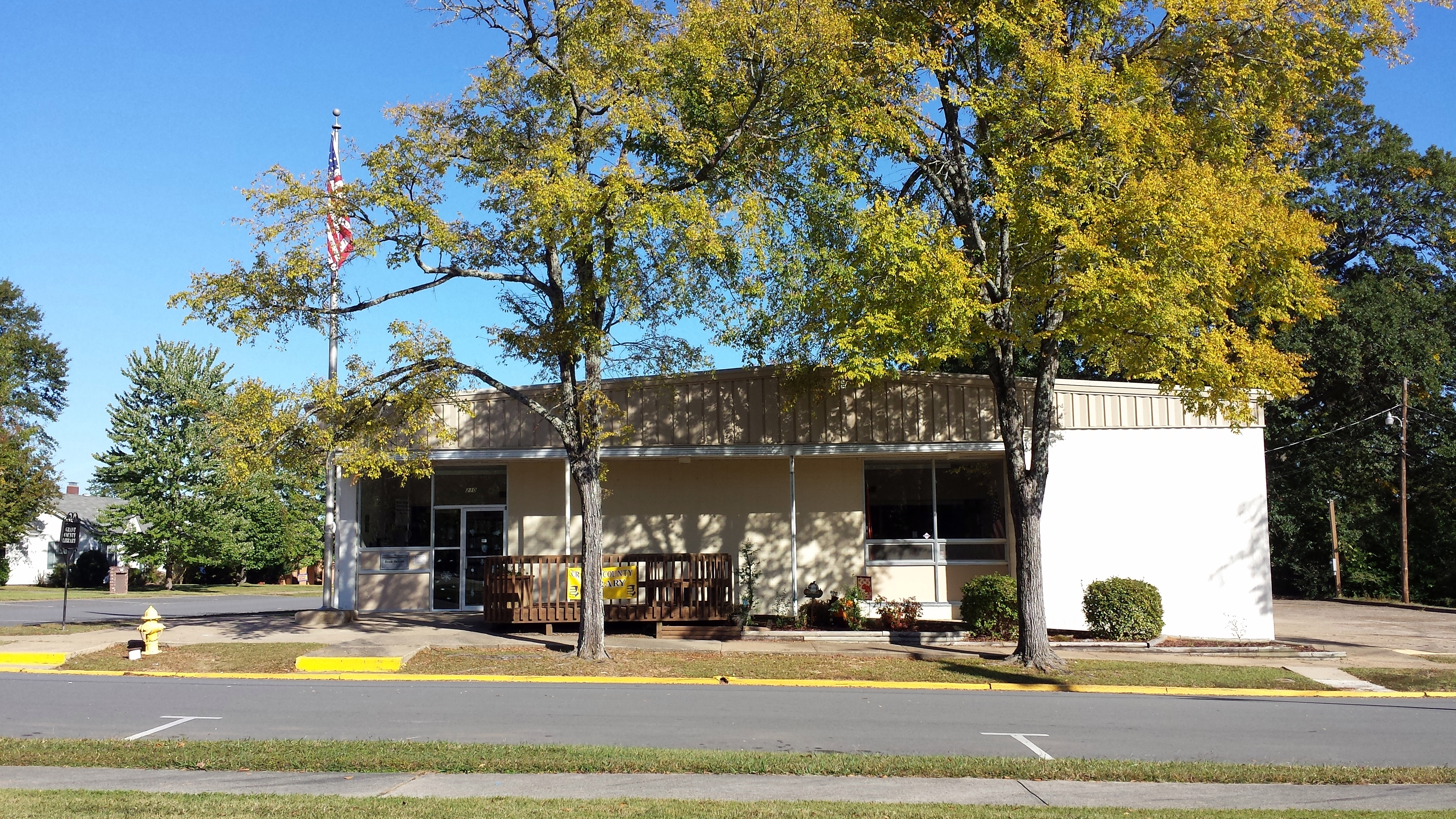
Grant County Library in Sheridan

The Grant County Museum, located on Shackleford Road in Sheridan, preserves and interprets the history and culture of the county for residents and visitors. The museum features exhibits detailing the Battle of Jenkins' Ferry, a segment of the Union's failed Red River Campaign during the Civil War, as well as a large World War II vehicle collection. Other exhibits include pioneer life and settlement in Grant County, and the flora and fauna native to the county. The Heritage Square is also on the museum grounds, featuring ten relocated and restored buildings. Just 5.8 miles north of Sheridan is the B-17 Crash Memorial where a replica B-17 was constructed to honor nine airmen who died in a plane crash at this location in 1943.

== Media ==
Bales and Cleveland started the first newspaper in the Grant County area, titled The Sheridan Spy. The first issue was dated September 1, 1881. In 1882, the Hon. J.S. Williams, who a year later became a state senator, bought the Sheridan Spy and renamed it The Sheridan Headlight, which is still published today. The short lived Grant County News was started in 1916 by William GoForth.

== Utilities ==
Sheridan's water system originated in the 1930s, when a private entity began installing water lines in the area. The system was later acquired by the city and is now operated by the Sheridan Water and Sewer Department, which functions as an enterprise fund separate from general city finances.

Today, Sheridan is capable of treating groundwater obtained from five wells at a rate of approximately 4.5 million gallons (17 million liters) per day (MGD/MLD). In recent years, the city has undertaken efforts to modernize its water infrastructure, including the development of a comprehensive water system map and long-term planning initiatives aimed at improving reliability and supporting future growth.

Sheridan's wastewater treatment facility is located at the end of Gatzke Drive and discharges treated effluent to Big Creek in accordance with permits issued by the Arkansas Department of Environmental Quality. The facility utilizes a three-cell pond stabilization system followed by a holding pond and is designed for a flow of 0.67 MGD (2.5 MLD).

Some areas within the city limits are served by neighboring rural water systems, and the city coordinates with these providers when necessary to support regional water service needs.

== Notable people ==
- Ken Bragg, Republican member of the Arkansas House of Representatives from Sheridan since 2013
- Buck Fausett, Major League Baseball player
- David Delano Glover, representative for Arkansas's 6th congressional district from 1929 to 1935
- Ray Hamilton, football player in the National Football League
- John Little McClellan, lawyer and politician, representative and senator for Arkansas
- Earl Smith, baseball player who played for Giants and Pirates.
- Eddie Joe Williams, State Senate Majority Leader, formerly mayor of Cabot, Arkansas

== See also ==
- List of cities and towns in Arkansas
- List of places named after people in the United States
- National Register of Historic Places listings in Grant County, Arkansas
