= Boston-area streetcar lines =

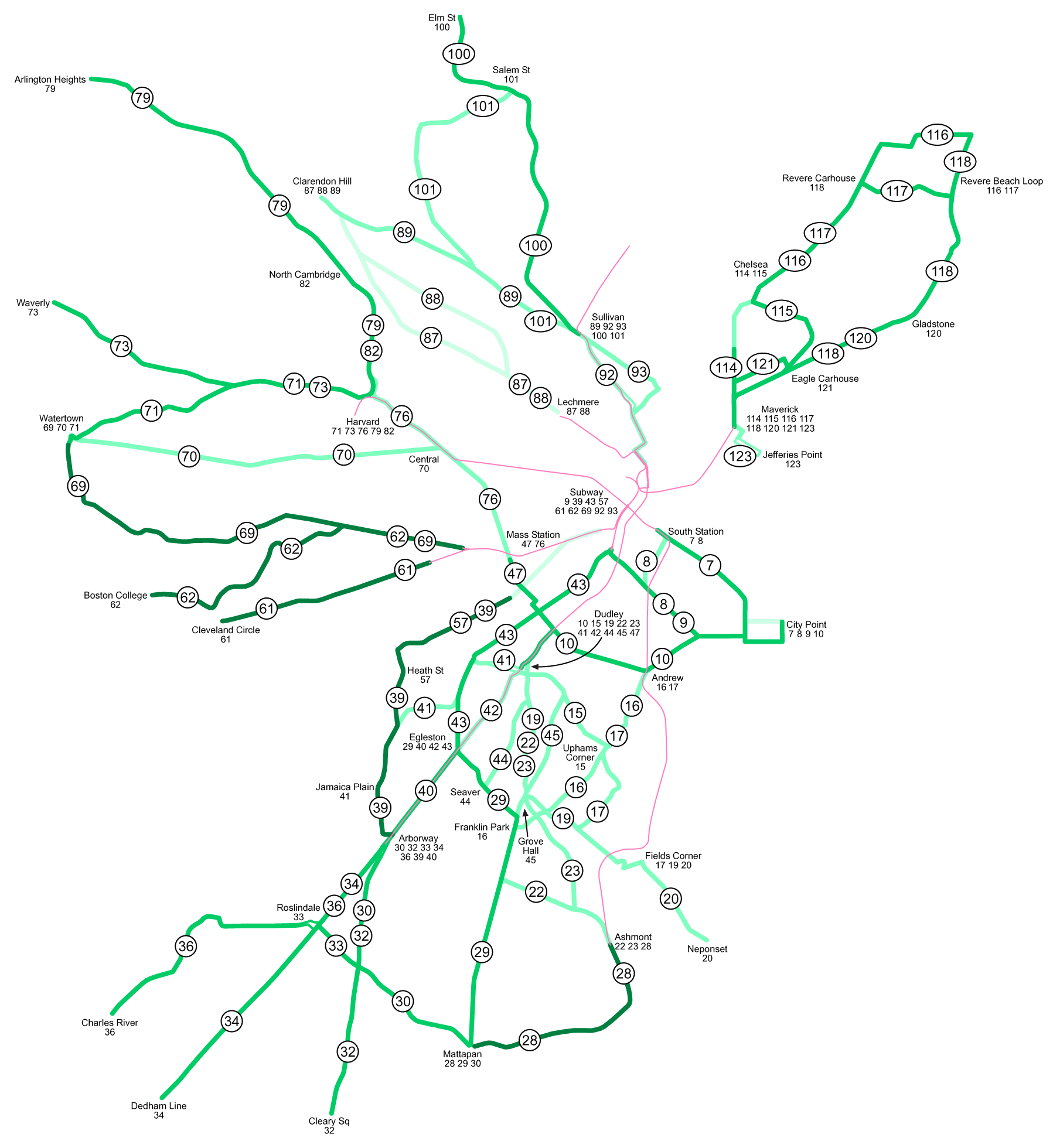
Boston-area streetcar lines remaining in 1940 (in green), plotted against a map of the BERy's subway and elevated lines (in purple). The shade of green for each line denotes how long the line lasted after this; the lightest-green lines were abandoned in 1945 or earlier, the second-lightest lines were abandoned from 1946 to 1950, the second-darkest lines were abandoned from 1951 to 1969, and the darkest-green lines still existed in 1969.

As with many large cities, a large number of Boston-area streetcar lines once existed, and many continued operating into the 1950s. However, only a few now remain, namely the four branches of the Green Line and the Mattapan Line, with only one (the Green Line E branch) running regular service on an undivided street.

== History ==
The first streetcar line in the Boston area was a horse-drawn line from Central Square, Cambridge to Bowdoin Square, Boston opened by the Cambridge Railroad on March 26, 1856. Over the following decade a large number of horsecar lines were built by different companies, including the Metropolitan Railroad, Middlesex Railroad, and South Boston Railroad; these companies competed with each other while also sharing tracks in many locations. By the mid-1860s horsecar lines reached to Lynn, Arlington, Watertown, Newton, West Roxbury, and Milton. In 1887 the various Boston-area horsecar companies (except for the Lynn and Boston Railroad) were all consolidated into the West End Street Railway.

In 1889 the West End Street Railway experimented with electric power for its streetcars; the results were so promising that it abandoned a cable car project already under construction. Several lines were electrified in 1889 and by 1895 almost the entire system had been electrified. The last horsecar line was abandoned in 1900.

In 1897 the recently formed Boston Elevated Railway (BERy) took over the West End Street Railway in order to make the streetcar lines part of its planned rapid transit system. In 1897 the Tremont Street Subway opened and many streetcar routes that had previously used surface tracks in downtown Boston were rerouted into the subway. Over the following decades the opening elevated and underground rapid transit lines (which became today's Orange Line and Red Line), as well as extensions of the Tremont Street subway (which became the Green Line), allowed progressively more streetcar lines to be removed from the congested streets downtown and rerouted to rapid transit stations further out. Passengers could transfer for free between streetcars and rapid transit lines to complete their journeys to or from downtown. In 1904 the East Boston Tunnel opened and was initially used to allow streetcars from East Boston to reach downtown, but in 1924 it was converted into another rapid transit line (part of today's Blue Line) operated with free transfers to and from streetcars at Maverick station.

In the 1920s as competition from cars increased and bus technology improved, the BERy began replacing some of its streetcar lines with buses. These conversions accelerated in the 1930s, with some routes also converted to trolleybuses (locally referred to as 'trackless trolleys'). Bus conversions paused during World War II when gasoline and rubber were in limited supply, but resumed in the late 1940s.

In 1947 the Metropolitan Transit Authority (MTA) was formed to take over the streetcar, bus, and rapid transit operations of the Boston Elevated Railway. It continued to convert lines from streetcar (and trackless trolley) to bus. In 1964 the MTA's operations were in turn taken over by the Massachusetts Bay Transportation Authority (MBTA), which also took over other bus systems running to suburban towns outside the MTA area. By this point the only remaining streetcar lines were five routes running into the Tremont Street Subway and one route on private right-of-way between Mattapan and Ashmont at the end of the Red Line. These were respectively designated as the Green Line branches A thru E and as part of the Red Line. The Green Line "A" branch was subsequently abandoned in 1969 and the "E" branch south of Heath Street abandoned in 1985.

=== Route numbering ===
In 1936, the BERy assigned numbers to its routes for map use, but route numbers were not used on buses until the late 1960s (when the colors were assigned to the remaining rail lines). Additionally, the numbers were only kept the same on and after the 1942 revision of the map; before that they were changed with each new version. A few routes were renumbered around 1967, but most routes have kept their original numbers even through conversions from streetcar to trackless trolley to bus. Routes were numbered roughly clockwise from South Boston to East Boston.

== Timeline of streetcar abandonments ==
This is a table of when each streetcar line was converted to trackless trolley or bus. Only information post-1940 is complete.

Routes:	4/Green Line "D" 7 8 9 10 11 15 16 17 19 20 21 22 23 25 26 27 28/Red Line Mattapan 29 30 32 33 34 36 39/Green Line "E" (Arborway) 40 41 42 43 44 45 47 48 55 57/Green Line "E" (Heath) 58 60 61/Green Line "C" 62/Green Line "B" 65 66 69/Green Line "A" 70 71 72 73 76 77 79 80 81 82 87 88 89 90 92 93 99 100 101 102 103 104 105 106 109 110 111 112 113 114 115 116 117 118 119 120 121 123

Last day of streetcars	Route	Notes
Still operational	4 Riverside–subway	Renamed Green Line D branch ca. 1967
Still operational	28 Mattapan–Ashmont High Speed Line	Number dropped and considered part of Red Line ca. 1967; Still runs 1940s-era PCC streetcars
Still operational	57 Heath Street–subway	Renamed Green Line E branch (short-turn) ca. 1967
Still operational	61 Cleveland Circle–subway	Renamed Green Line C branch ca. 1967
Still operational	62 Boston College–subway	Renamed Green Line B branch ca. 1967
December 27, 1985	39 Arborway–subway	Renamed Green Line E branch ca. 1967, reverted to 39 when replaced by bus
June 20, 1969	69 Watertown–subway	Renamed Green Line A branch ca. 1967, reverted to 57 when replaced by bus
October 28, 1963	New northbound subway routing from Government Center to Haymarket opens, ending service to Adams Square station	
April 5, 1962	Shuttle Pleasant Street–Boylston	Last service to the Pleasant Street incline
November 17, 1961	43 Lenox Street–subway	Had been cut back from Egleston to Lenox Street June 14, 1956
July 4, 1959	4 Riverside–subway (Highland branch) opens	
September 4, 1958	71 Watertown–Harvard	Trackless trolley until March 13, 2022
September 4, 1958	73 Waverly–Harvard	Trackless trolley until March 13, 2022
September 4, 1958	82 North Cambridge–Harvard	Replacement trackless trolley route renumbered 77A ca. 1967; Trackless trolley until March 13, 2022 (after January 2005 ran only to move trackless trolleys between routes 71/72/73 and North Cambridge carhouse)
June 14, 1956	43 Egleston–subway	Cut back to Lenox Street
December 16, 1955	40 Arborway–Egleston	
December 16, 1955	100 Elm Street–Sullivan	
November 18, 1955	79 Arlington Heights–Harvard	Replacement bus route renumbered 77 ca. 1967
September 9, 1955	29 Mattapan–Egleston	
December 4, 1953	9 City Point–subway	
December 4, 1953	10 City Point–Dudley	
September 12, 1953	47 Massachusetts station–Dudley	Replacement bus route renumbered 1 ca. 1967
June 19, 1953	7 City Point–South Station via Summer Street	
April 24, 1953	30 Mattapan–Arborway	
April 24, 1953	32 Cleary Square–Arborway	Trackless trolley until September 30, 1958
November 21, 1952	34 Dedham Line–Arborway	Trackless trolley until September 5, 1958
June 20, 1952	33 Roslindale–Arborway via Hyde Park Avenue	
January 4, 1952	114 Meridian Street–Maverick	Turned around at the south end of the closed Meridian Street Bridge since June 12, 1950; Trackless trolley after the Meridian Street Bridge reopened ca. 1954 until March 30, 1961 (Woodlawn–Maverick)
January 4, 1952	115 Chelsea Square–Maverick	Short-turn of 116/117; Trackless trolley until ca. 1954 (Woodlawn–Wood Island)
January 4, 1952	116 Revere Beach Loop–Maverick via Revere Street	Had run into the subway via the Mystic River Bridge and North Station until 1934; Trackless trolley until September 8, 1961 (Wonderland–Wood Island)
January 4, 1952	117 Revere Beach Loop–Maverick via Beach Street	Had run into the subway via the Mystic River Bridge and North Station until 1934; Trackless trolley until September 8, 1961 (Wonderland–Wood Island)
January 4, 1952	118 Revere carhouse–Maverick via Ocean Avenue and Bennington Street	Trackless trolley until June 18, 1955 (Wonderland–Orient Heights)
January 4, 1952	120 Gladstone–Maverick	Short-turn of 118; Trackless trolley until September 8, 1961 (Orient Heights–Maverick)
January 4, 1952	121 Eagle Street–Maverick via Lexington Street	Trackless trolley until March 30, 1961 (Wood Island–Maverick)
September 28, 1951	36 Charles River Loop–Arborway	Trackless trolley until September 5, 1958
June 16, 1950	70 Watertown–Central	Trackless trolley until March 30, 1963
June 12, 1950	Meridian Street Bridge closes for construction; 114 cut back to south end of bridge, 116 and 117 rerouted via Chelsea Street Bridge	
December 9, 1949	16 Franklin Park–Andrew	Trackless trolley until April 5, 1962
September 18, 1949	76 Harvard–Massachusetts station	Route 76 ran only Harvard Square–MIT from September 12 to 18, after which route 70 was extended from Central Square to MIT until November 9 Trackless trolley from April 22, 1950 until March 30, 1961
September 16, 1949	42 Egleston–Dudley	
July 1, 1949	93 Sullivan–subway via Bunker Hill Street	
June 7, 1949	41 Jamaica Plain–Dudley	
April 22, 1949	123 Jefferies Point–Maverick	
February 11, 1949	17 Fields Corner–Andrew via Meeting House Hill	Trackless trolley until April 5, 1962
January 28, 1949	44 Seaver–Dudley	Trackless trolley until March 30, 1961
January 7, 1949	19 Fields Corner–Dudley via Geneva Avenue	Trackless trolley until April 5, 1962
January 7, 1949	22 Ashmont-Dudley via Talbot Avenue	Trackless trolley until April 5, 1962
January 7, 1949	23 Ashmont-Dudley via Washington Street, Dorchester	Trackless trolley until April 6, 1962
December 24, 1948	15 Uphams Corner–Dudley	Trackless trolley until April 5, 1962 (Kane Square–Dudley)
December 24, 1948	45 Grove Hall–Dudley via Blue Hill Avenue	Trackless trolley until April 5, 1962
December 24, 1948	Dudley–subway late night service	Daytime streetcar service had ended March 4, 1938
June 18, 1948	20 Fields Corner–Neponset	Trackless trolley from December 10, 1949 until March 31, 1961
May 1, 1948	Quincy Point–Fields Corner	Operated by Eastern Massachusetts Street Railway
April 2, 1948	92 Sullivan–subway via Main Street	
April 18, 1947	101 Salem Street–Sullivan via Winter Hill	Trackless trolley until March 13, 1959
April 3, 1947	8 City Point–South Station via Dorchester Avenue	Had been split into two segments since the Dorchester Avenue Bridge closed for reconstruction on December 2, 1946
December 6, 1946	89 Clarendon Hill–Sullivan	Trackless trolley until March 29, 1963
July 27, 1946	99 Stoneham–Sullivan	Operated by Eastern Massachusetts Street Railway north of Spot Pond
June 29, 1946	Houghs Neck–Fields Corner	Operated by Eastern Massachusetts Street Railway
November 7, 1941	87 Clarendon Hill–Lechmere via Somerville Avenue	Had run into the subway via Lechmere until July 9, 1922; Trackless trolley until March 29, 1963
November 7, 1941	88 Clarendon Hill–Lechmere via Highland Avenue	Had run into the subway via Lechmere until July 9, 1922; Trackless trolley until March 29, 1963
February 16, 1941	Huntington Avenue subway opens and routes 39 and 57 are rerouted to use it, ending surface-running via eastern Huntington Avenue, Boylston Street and the Public Gardens incline	
September 8, 1939	90 Davis Square–Sullivan via Highland Avenue	Trackless trolley from September 13, 1947 until December 14, 1956
December 30, 1938	103 Malden Square–Everett via Main Street	Short-turn of 106; Trackless trolley until April 1962
December 30, 1938	106 Lebanon Street–Everett via Malden Square	Trackless trolley until March 29, 1963
September 9, 1938	66 Allston–Dudley	
September 9, 1938	Brookline Village–subway via Huntington Ave	Rush-hour only since 1934
March 4, 1938	48 Dudley–subway	Remained in use for late night service until December 24, 1948
December 10, 1937	112 Everett Square–Chelsea Square	Trackless trolley until June 23, 1961 (Malden Square–Chelsea Square via Everett Square)
December 10, 1937	113 Malden Square–Chelsea Square via Ferry Street	Trackless trolley until June 23, 1961
October 1937	72 Aberdeen Avenue–Harvard via Huron Avenue	Trackless trolley from April 2, 1938 until March 2013
September 10, 1937	104 Malden–Everett via Ferry Street and Broadway	Trackless trolley until March 30, 1963
June 18, 1937	110 Woodlawn–Everett	Trackless trolley until March 30, 1963 (Revere–Everett after September 8, 1940)
May 7, 1937	111 Woodlawn–Chelsea Square	Had run into the subway via the Mystic River Bridge and North Station until 1934
March 1937	Local lines in Lynn	Operated by Eastern Massachusetts Street Railway
February 1937	Lynn–Chelsea Square	Operated by Eastern Massachusetts Street Railway; Had run into the subway via the Mystic River Bridge and North Station until 1934
January 8, 1937	109 Everett carhouse–Everett via Broadway	Had been cut back from Linden to Everett carhouse (at Broadway and Cameron Street) September 16, 1933; Trackless trolley until March 30, 1963 (Linden–Everett)
October 9, 1936	119 Beachmont–Day Square via Broadway and Chelsea Street Bridge	Had run into the subway via the Mystic River Bridge and North Station until 1934
June 10, 1936	EMSR Chelsea division routes (111–113 and 116–119) acquired by BERy with several rerouted to East Boston; some of these had run into the subway via the Mystic River Bridge and North Station until 1934	
April 10, 1936	77 Harvard–Lechmere via Cambridge Street	Had run into the subway via Lechmere until July 9, 1922; Trackless trolley until March 30, 1963 (first trackless trolley route); Replacement bus route renumbered 69 ca. 1967
October 1935	Salem–Chelsea Square	Operated by Eastern Massachusetts Street Railway; Had run into the subway via the Mystic River Bridge and North Station until 1934
July 13, 1934	55 Brookline Avenue–Massachusetts station	Had been cut back from Brookline Village to Brookline Avenue & Boylston Street 1933; Had been part of a line running from Chestnut Hill into the subway via the Public Gardens incline before 1925
June 10, 1934	58 Cypress Street–subway via Huntington Avenue	Rush-hour service between the subway and Brookline Village continued until 1938
January 13, 1934	Mystic River Bridge (between Chelsea and Charlestown) closes for construction; EMSR routes from Woodlawn, Beachmont, Revere, Lynn and Salem cut back from the subway to Chelsea	
September 16, 1933	109 Linden–Everett via Broadway	Cut back to Everett carhouse (at Broadway and Cameron Street); Trackless trolley from November 28, 1936 until March 30, 1963
May 24, 1933	27 Pierce Square–Ashmont	
November 4, 1932	60 Chestnut Hill–subway via Huntington Avenue	
October 23, 1932	Kenmore station opens, extending the Boylston Street subway to a new portal on Beacon Street used by route 61 and a new portal on Commonwealth Avenue used by routes 62 and 69	
July 8, 1932	80 Arlington Center–Sullivan via Medford Hillside	Trackless trolley from September 12, 1953 until March 30, 1963 (Arlington Center–Lechmere)
June 10, 1932	Framingham Center–Boston Park Square	Operated by Boston and Worcester Street Railway; Had been cut back from Worcester to Framingham January 15, 1931
April 1930	Norumbega Park–Boston College via Commonwealth Avenue	Operated by Middlesex and Boston Street Railway
1930	Dorchester Avenue	
December 21, 1929	28 (Ashmont–Mattapan High Speed Line) opens to Mattapan	
August 26, 1929	28 (Ashmont–Mattapan High Speed Line) opens to Milton	
January 18 1929	11 Broadway?–Bay View	
November 22, 1929	26 Norfolk Street–Dudley	
September 1929	Framingham–Newton Corner via Natick and Wellesley	Operated by Middlesex and Boston Street Railway
late 1928	25 Andrew–Washington & Fairmount Streets Dorchester	
1926-1928	Local lines in Newton and Waltham	Operated by Middlesex and Boston Street Railway
April 23, 1926	65 Boston College–Brookline Village	Had run into the subway via the Public Gardens incline before the 1922
July 18, 1925	81 Arlington Center–Clarendon Hill	Trackless trolley from September 12, 1953 to March 30, 1963
May 9, 1925	21 Fields Corner–Adams Street	
December 20, 1924	102 Faulkner–Malden	Trackless trolley from June 17, 1939 until March 30, 1963
December 20, 1924	105 Faulkner–Everett	Trackless trolley from June 17, 1939 until March 30, 1963
April 17, 1924	Last day of streetcars through the East Boston Tunnel, which had included routes to Chelsea (114), Orient Heights (120), Lexington Street (121), Jeffries Point (123), and Kendall Square	
July 9, 1922	Last day of surface lines (77, 87, 88) entering the subway via Lechmere	

== MTA streetcar routes as of 1953 ==
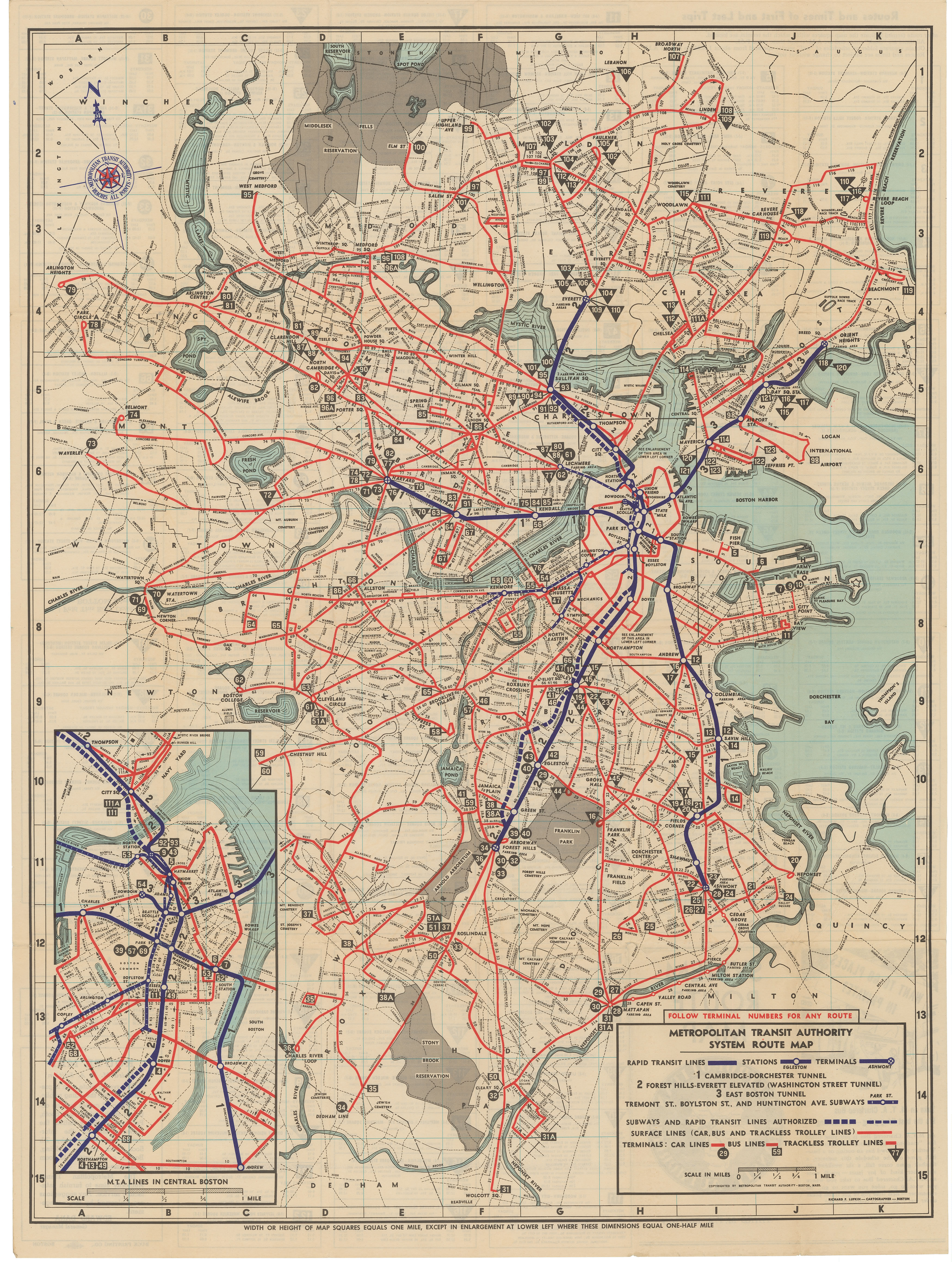
A map of the MTA's transit network in 1952, with streetcars indicated by route numbers in circles, buses by route numbers in rectangles, and trackless trolleys by route numbers in triangles

As of early 1953 the Metropolitan Transit Authority operated the following streetcar routes. All lines were connected via trackage to the Tremont Street subway (Green Line), but only the 9, 39, 43, 57, 61, 62 and 69 actually operated in the subway.

- 7 City Point–South Station via Summer Street: Ran essentially the same route from City Point to South Station as today's route 7 bus, which replaced it in June 1953.
- 9 City Point–subway: Ran via Broadway to the Pleasant Street subway portal and through the subway to North Station. Replaced in December 1953 by the 9 bus from City Point to Broadway & Tremont Street, which was extended to Copley Square in 1975.
- 10 City Point–Dudley: Ran via Broadway, Dorchester Street, Southampton Street, Northampton Street and Washington Street to Dudley station (today known as Nubian station) on the Washington Street Elevated. Replaced in December 1953 by the 10 bus, which was rerouted via Boston Medical Center to Copley Square in 1987 due to the relocation of the southern Orange Line.
- 28 Mattapan–Ashmont: Today known as the Mattapan Line.
- 29 Mattapan–Egleston via Blue Hill Avenue and Seaver Street: Ran from Mattapan north on Blue Hill Avenue and Seaver Street (both parts of State Highway 28) to Egleston station on the Washington Street Elevated. Replaced in September 1959 by the 29 bus, which was extended to Jackson Square station (with some trips continuing to Ruggles) in 1987 due to the relocation of the southern Orange Line.
- 30 Mattapan–Arborway via Cummins Highway: Ran from Mattapan along Cummins Highway and Hyde Park Avenue to Arborway station. Replaced in April 1953 by bus service with branches to both Arborway via Hyde Park Avenue (30A) and Roslindale Square via Cummins Highway (30). The 30A branch was discontinued in 1981, but since the 1990s most 30 trips have been extended via Washington Street to Forest Hills station.
- 32 Cleary Square–Arborway: Ran along Hyde Park Avenue. Replaced in April 1953 by the 32 trackless trolley, which was converted to bus in March 1963 and extended south to Wolcott Square in 1981.
- 39 Arborway–subway via Huntington Avenue: Ran along Centre Street, South Huntington Avenue, Huntington Avenue, and through the Huntington Avenue Subway and Boylston Street Subway to Park Street station. Became the Green Line E branch. Replaced in December 1985 by the 39 bus running between Forest Hills and Copley Square, but short-turn service from the subway to Brigham Circle was restored in July 1986 and to Heath Street in November 1989.
- 40 Arborway–Egleston via Washington Street: Ran under the Washington Street Elevated between Egleston station and Forest Hills station. Replaced in December 1955 by a bus route that was subsequently discontinued in June 1971. In April 1981 the 42 bus was extended to cover the former 40 route.
- 43 Egleston–subway: Ran from Egleston via Columbus Avenue and Tremont Street to the Pleasant Street subway portal and through the subway to North Station. Before December 1953, when route 9 operated into the same portal, the 43 used the two west tracks. Afterwards, it was realigned to use the two east tracks, allowing for a larger bus transfer area to the west. Replaced by the 43 bus in two stages, south of Lenox Street in June 1956 and north of Lenox Street to the subway portal in November 1961. The bus route was extended north to loop around Boston Common in June 1972, and had its south end truncated from Egleston to the new Ruggles station in 1987 due to the relocation of the southern Orange Line.
- 47 Massachusetts station–Dudley: Ran from Massachusetts Avenue station (now Hynes Convention Center station) south along Massachusetts Avenue, southwest one block on Columbus Avenue, southeast on Northampton Street and southwest on Washington Street beneath the elevated to Dudley station (today known as Nubian station). Replaced in September 1953 by bus service, which in September 1962 was merged with the 76 Harvard–Massachusetts station bus route to form the route 1 bus from Harvard to Dudley.
- 57 Heath Street–subway: Today known as the Green Line E branch. Service south of Brigham Circle was temporarily suspended 1980-1982 and 1985-1989.
- 61 Cleveland Circle–subway: Today known as the Green Line C branch.
- 62 Cleveland Circle–subway: Today known as the Green Line B branch.
- 69 Watertown–subway: Ran along Galen Street, Washington Street (Newton), Park Street (Newton), Tremont Street (Newton/Brighton), Washington Street (Brighton), Cambridge Street (Brighton), North Beacon Street, Commonwealth Avenue, into the Blandford Street subway portal and through the Boylston Street Subway to Park Street station. Became the Green Line A branch. Replaced by the 57 bus from Watertown to Kenmore in June 1969.
- 71 Watertown–Harvard: Ran essentially the same route from Watertown to the Harvard station transit tunnel as today's 71 bus, which replaced it in September 1958 (as a trackless trolley until March 2022). See also Trolleybuses in Greater Boston#Harvard-based routes.
- 73 Waverley–Harvard: Ran essentially the same route from Waverley station to the Harvard station transit tunnel as today's 73 bus, which replaced it in September 1958 (as a trackless trolley until March 2022). See also Trolleybuses in Greater Boston#Harvard-based routes.
- 79 Arlington Heights–Harvard: Ran essentially the same route from Arlington Heights to the Harvard station transit tunnel as today's 77 bus, which replaced it in November 1955 (renumbered from 79 to 77 in the late 1960s).
- 82 North Cambridge–Harvard: Ran from North Cambridge carhouse to the Harvard station transit tunnel via Massachusetts Avenue. Replaced by a trackless trolley route in September 1958, which was renumbered 77A in the late 1960s. In January 2005 most service on the 77A route was eliminated but it continued to operate on trips to get trackless trolley vehicles between the carhouse and routes 71 and 73 until the latter routes were converted to buses in March 2022. See also Trolleybuses in Greater Boston#Harvard-based routes.
- 100 Elm Street–Sullivan via Fellsway: Ran from Elm Street on Fellsway West in Medford via Fellsway and Mystic Avenue to Sullivan station on the Charlestown Elevated. Track connections to the rest of the system were provided by the otherwise unused streetcar tracks under the elevated from Sullivan south to the Causeway Street incline, once used by route 92. Route 100 was replaced in December 1955 by the 100 bus, which was rerouted to Wellington station in 1975 due to the relocation of the northern Orange Line.

== Eastern Massachusetts Street Railway routes ==
The Eastern Massachusetts Street Railway (EMSR) operated lines between Boston and towns north and south of the Boston area, including Lynn, Salem, Reading, Lowell, Lawrence, Quincy, Hingham, and Brockton. It also operated local streetcar service within those towns. The company was formed in 1919 to take over the lines of the bankrupt Bay State Street Railway, which advertised itself as "the world's largest street railway system" in the 1910s. Between 1931 and 1937, EMSR replaced almost all of its streetcar routes with bus service. Only three streetcar lines were left by the end of 1937, all linking Boston to nearby towns.

=== Stoneham–Sullivan ===
This streetcar line ran between Sullivan Square#Elevated station and Stoneham, Massachusetts. It left Sullivan operated by a Boston Elevated Railway driver and ran via the tracks of BERy's 100 line. It continued beyond from the north end of the 100 through the Middlesex Fells on a privateright-of-way west of Fellsway West. At a stop called "Sheepfold" near Spot Pond in Middlesex Fells, the operator was replaced by an EMSR employee who drove the streetcar the rest of the way into Stoneham and alongside Main Street to the terminal at Farm Hill Station of the Boston and Maine Railroad Stoneham Branch.

The line was bustituted in 1946. In 1968 the MBTA took the bus service over as the 430, and from March 1969 to the end of its service in September 1971, it was part of the 100A Reading–Sullivan via Main Street and Fellsway.

=== Quincy routes ===
Two Quincy routes left Fields Corner station, running to Quincy center and then splitting. One line continued to Hough's Neck, and the other to Quincy Point and the Fore River Shipyard. The lines were bustituted in 1946 and 1948 respectively. The bus routes that replaced them eventually became MBTA routes 210, 216, and 220/222.

== See also ==
- Middlesex and Boston Street Railway
- Eastern Massachusetts Street Railway
- List of streetcar systems in Massachusetts
