= MBTA bus =

Greater Boston bus network

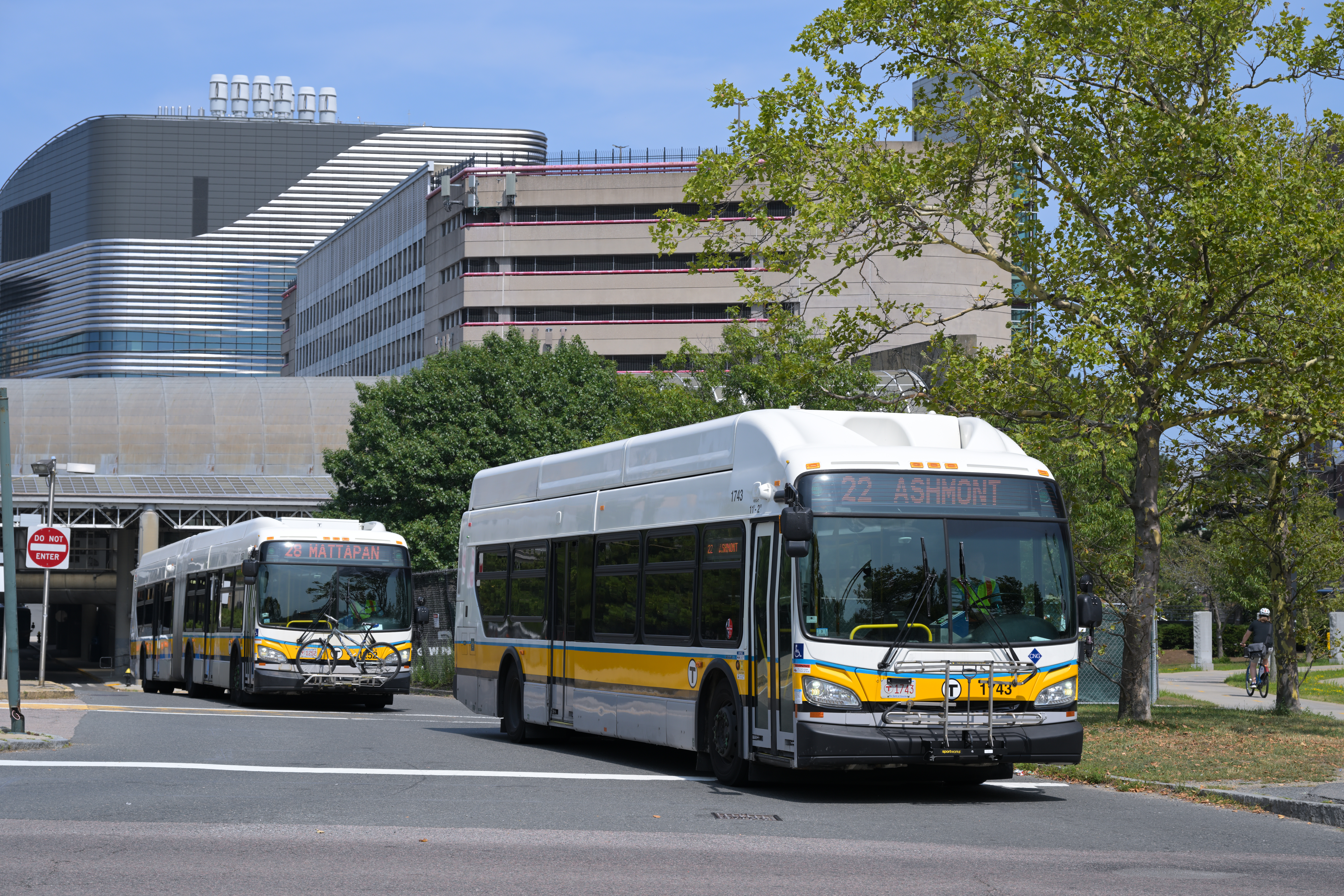
- MBTA buses at Ruggles station in 2025
- Parent: Massachusetts Bay Transportation Authority (MBTA)
- Founded: 1964 (predecessors date to 1856)
- Locale: Greater Boston
- Service type: Local, limited stop, express, and BRT
- Routes: 150
- Fleet: 1,115 (active)
- Daily ridership: 335,300 (weekdays, Q2 2026)
- Annual ridership: 95,156,800 (2025)
- Fuel type: Diesel, diesel-electric hybrid, CNG, battery-electric
- Operator: MBTA; private operators
- Website: mbta.com/bus
System map

The Massachusetts Bay Transportation Authority (MBTA) operates 150 bus routes in the Greater Boston area. The MBTA has a policy objective to provide transit service within walking distance – defined as 0.25 miles (0.40 km) – for all residents living in areas with population densities greater than 5,000 inhabitants per square mile (1,900/km^{2}) within the MBTA's service district. Much of this service is provided by bus. In 2025, the system had a ridership of 95,156,800, or about 335,300 per weekday as of the second quarter of 2026.

Most MBTA bus routes are local service operated in Boston and its inner suburbs and connect to MBTA subway stations. Fifteen high-ridership local routes are designated as key routes, with higher frequency at all operating hours. The MBTA operates a five-route bus rapid transit service branded as the Silver Line, as well as a limited-stop crosstown route. Three smaller local networks are based in the nearby cities of Lynn, Waltham, and Quincy. Several express routes operate from suburbs to downtown Boston.

The MBTA has an active bus fleet around 1,040 buses with diesel-electric hybrid or compressed natural gas propulsion. Replacement of the full fleet with battery electric buses is planned. The entire bus system is accessible; all vehicles are low-floor buses with fold-out ramps.

Most routes are operated directly by the MBTA. Four suburban routes are run by private operators under contract to the MBTA, while several small circulator systems are run by other operators with partial MBTA subsidy. MBTA-operated buses operate from nine divisions based at eight garages. One additional garage is under reconstruction; a replacement for a second is under construction, and additional replacements are planned. Several sections of dedicated right-of-way for MBTA buses have been opened in the 21st century, including two off-street busways for the Silver Line and a number of dedicated bus lanes.

The modern bus system descends from a network of horsecar and electric streetcar lines built in the 1850s to 1910s, which were consolidated under the West End Street Railway and later Boston Elevated Railway (BERy). The BERy introduced buses in 1922 to replace lightly-used streetcar lines and expand into new areas. Over the next four decades under the BERy and Metropolitan Transit Authority (MTA), all but six streetcar routes were converted to bus or trolleybus. Most trolleybuses were phased out by the 1960s, but four routes lasted until 2022. The MBTA took over the MTA in 1964, and several private suburban bus operators over the following two decades. Many routes have been modified during the MBTA era; the agency introduced crosstown routes in 1994 and the Silver Line in 2002.

== History ==
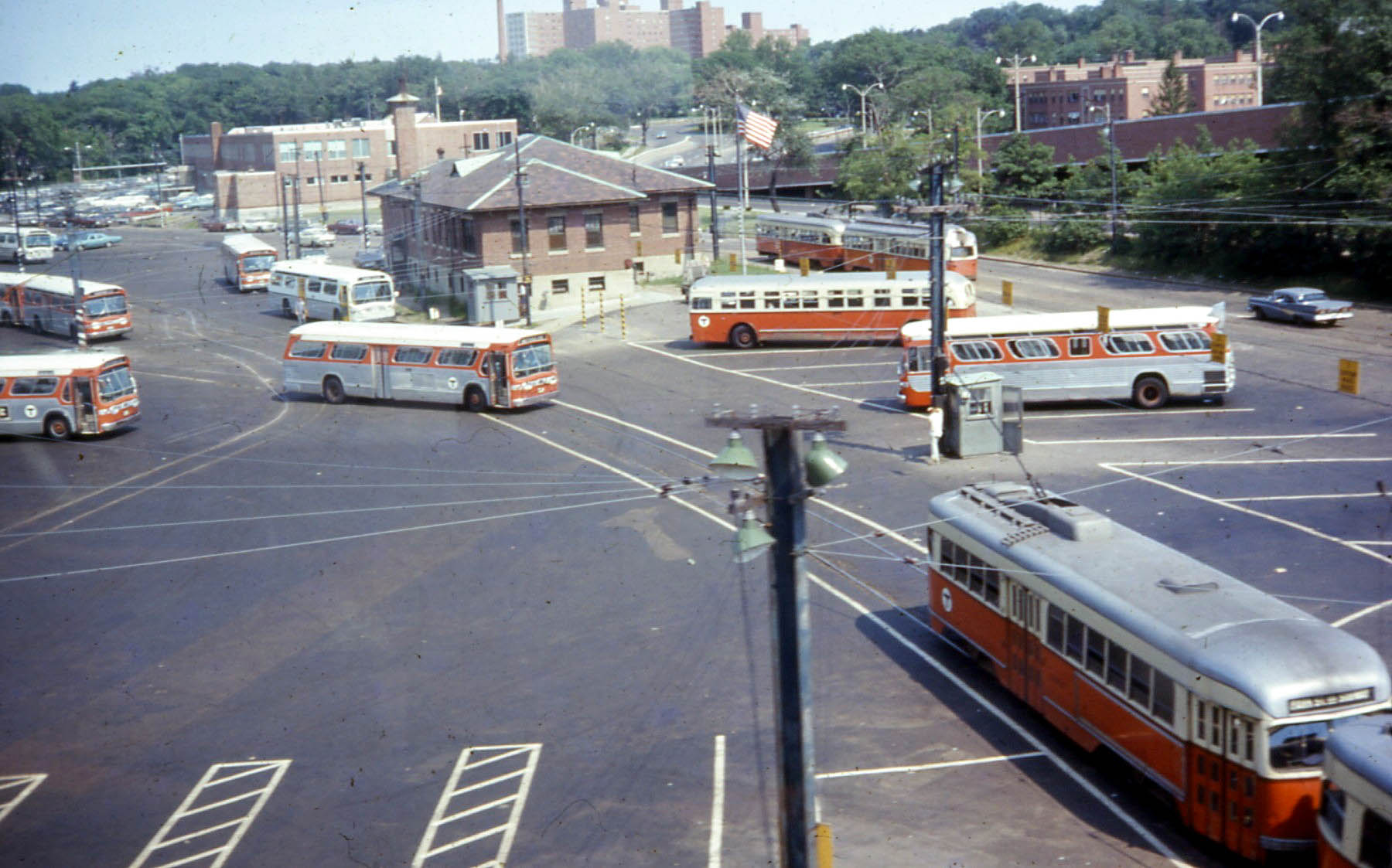
Buses at Arborway Yard in 1967

A number of horsecar lines were built in Boston and surrounding towns in the second half of the 19th century, beginning with the Cambridge Railroad in 1856. Several smaller companies were consolidated into the West End Street Railway in 1887. The West End began electrifying existing lines and constructing new streetcar lines; the last horsecar lines ended in 1900. The West End was purchased in 1897 by the Boston Elevated Railway (BERy), which had been created to build a rapid transit system in Boston. As that system was constructed in the first two decades of the 20th century, many streetcar lines were cut back from downtown Boston to rapid transit stations. Stations like Sullivan Square, Dudley Square, Forest Hills, Harvard, and Andrew were built as transfer stations with easy connections between subway and rapid transit.

Some small companies operated buses in Boston as early as the 1910s. BERy bus service began on February 23, 1922, when buses replaced the North Beacon Street streetcar line. Initial bus routes largely replaced lightly-used streetcar lines or expanded service to new areas. The BERy also attempted in the 1920s to make the Tremont Street streetcar subway operate more like a rapid transit line, using trains of streetcars entering the subway from a small number of feeder lines, rather than single streetcars from numerous surface lines. The Harvard–Lechmere streetcar line was converted to trackless trolley (trolleybus) on April 11, 1936 – the first route in what would become an extensive trackless trolley system.

As increased automobile usage reduced ridership and increased congestion, the BERy and its 1947 replacement Metropolitan Transit Authority (MTA) continued to convert streetcar lines to bus and trolleybus. Most trolleybus lines were replaced by buses in the late 1940s to early 1960s, as buses offered increased flexibility and no need to maintain overhead lines. When the Massachusetts Bay Transportation Authority (MBTA) replaced the MTA in 1964, all surface lines were operated by buses except six streetcar lines (the five Green Line branches plus the Mattapan Line) and four trolleybus lines. The MBTA rebranded many elements of Boston's public transportation network in its first decade. After being found unsuitable in 1965 for the Orange Line because it did not show up well on maps, yellow was chosen for the color of bus operations on January 8, 1972.

The MBTA had primarily been formed to subsidize the suburban commuter rail network. However, the agency also took over unprofitable suburban bus operations – much of which was former streetcar lines – from several private companies. The MBTA took over the Eastern Massachusetts Street Railway in 1968, inheriting large networks based in Lynn and Quincy plus several lines in Norwood and Melrose. (Networks serving Lowell, Lawrence, and Brockton outside the MBTA district were briefly operated by the MBTA. They were transferred to new public agencies: the LRTA in Lowell in 1976, a predecessor of the MVRTA in Lawrence in 1968, and a predecessor of the BAT in Brockton in 1969.) The MBTA began subsidizing Middlesex and Boston Street Railway service based in Newton and Waltham in 1964, and took over the remaining routes in 1972. Five former Service Bus Lines routes in northeast suburbs were taken over in 1975, and a single Brush Hill Transportation line in Milton was taken over in 1980.

The geographic scope of the MBTA bus network has remained relatively constant since these additions, though many services have been created, discontinued, and modified during the MBTA era. The openings of new sections of the Red Line (1971, 1980, 1984–85) and the Orange Line (1975–77, 1987) have resulted in significant changes as routes were modified to serve new transfer stations. Three limited-stop crosstown routes were created in 1994 as a prelude to the Urban Ring Project, a never-implemented circumferential bus rapid transit (BRT) corridor. Silver Line BRT service began in 2002 with conversion of existing bus service on Washington Street, and was expanded in 2004–05 with new routes serving the Waterfront Tunnel in the Seaport District. The latter used dual-mode buses that operated as trolleybuses in the Waterfront Tunnel and as diesel buses on the surface. A second Silver Line service using the Washington Street corridor was added in 2009, and service from the Waterfront Tunnel to Chelsea began in 2018 with a new surface busway in Chelsea.

The BERy and MTA operated overnight Owl service until 1960. From September 2001 to June 2005, the MBTA operated bus service on 17 routes (7 normal bus routes and 10 routes replicating subway lines) until 2:30am on Friday and Saturday nights. Similar service on the key routes was operated from March 2013 to March 2014. In 2017, the MBTA Board rejected a proposal to run all-night service on several routes with pulsed connections at a central hub.

In 2018, the MBTA began planning for the Bus Network Redesign, a reworking of the entire bus network. A draft plan was released in May 2022, with a revised plan in November 2022. That plan was approved in December 2022. It increases overall service by 25%, with a doubling of the number of routes with high-frequency service. The first changes were made on December 15, 2024, in areas northeast of downtown Boston. The second phase is planned to cover most of Boston and Brookline; the third and south phases are tentatively planned to cover northern and southern suburbs. Changes will take place through 2028. The second changes were made on April 5, 2026.

In 2022, the MBTA started cutting bus service due to a driver shortage resulting from a long-term retirement trend accelerated by the COVID-19 pandemic in Massachusetts. Despite paying for training to get a commercial driver's license and offering a $4,500 signing bonus, it ended the year short about 350 drivers, plus about 400 more needed to increase service to implement a proposed bus network redesign. Experts said the shortage was caused by the failure to raise the starting hourly wage, and offer new hires full-time work instead of forcing all of them to start part-time. Drivers were also unhappy about lack of access to bathrooms and "split shifts" with unpaid time between morning and evening rush hour that was too short to go home. The MBTA began hiring operators for full-time work in 2023. The number of bus drivers increased from about 1,350 in mid-2023 to about 1,500 in March 2024.

== Fleet ==
This is the current bus roster for the MBTA as of October 2026. All buses are manufactured by New Flyer and are 102 inches (260 cm) wide; most buses are 40-foot (12 m) length, while 117 are 60-foot (18 m) articulated buses. 80 New Flyer 40-foot battery-electric buses were ordered in July 2023. Thirty-two of those buses will have left-side doors for use in the Harvard bus tunnel. 40 additional electric buses were ordered in December 2025 to provide service for the Quincy Bus Maintenance Facility to be opened in 2027; 15 of these buses will be funded with settlement money from Volkswagen from their 2015 "Dieselgate" emissions cheating scandal. State law requires the MBTA to purchase only zero-emission buses after 2029 and mandates a fully-electrified fleet by 2040.

=== Current ===
Year built	Manufacturer	Model	Picture	Fleet	Qty.	Active	Propulsion	Length (ft.)	Notes
2008	New Flyer	D40LF		0756–0910	155	153	Diesel	40	All buses were overhauled in 2017–2020.; To be replaced by newer NFI XE40 buses.
2010	New Flyer	DE60LFR		1200–1224	25		Hybrid	60	All buses were overhauled by Northeastern Bus Rebuilders in 2021–2023
2014–2015	New Flyer	XDE40		1400–1459	60		Hybrid	40	Buses being overhauled by Midwest Bus; To be retired in 2028.
2016–2017	New Flyer	XN40		1600–1774	175		CNG	40	Buses being overhauled by MBTA at Everett Shops
2016–2017	New Flyer	XDE40		1775–1924 & 3000–3005	156		Hybrid	40	3000–3005 assigned to privately operated routes 712 and 713; Buses being overhauled by Midwest Bus with completion expected in 2027
2016–2017	New Flyer	XDE60		1250–1293	44		Hybrid	60	1273–1293 used for Silver Line Washington Street routes
2018	New Flyer	XDE60		1294	1		Hybrid	60	Includes an extended-range battery.; Used on the Silver Line.
2019	New Flyer	XE60		1295–1299	5		Battery-electric	60	Used on the Silver Line.; Only buses that do not have bike racks.
2019–2020	New Flyer	XDE40		1925–2118	194		Hybrid	40	
2020	New Flyer	XDE40		3100–3159	60		Hybrid	40	
2022–2023	New Flyer	XDE60		1300–1344	45		Hybrid	60	Includes an extended-range battery.; Used on the Silver Line.
2023	New Flyer	XDE40		3200–3359	160		Hybrid	40	
2024–2026	New Flyer	XE40		4200–4231	32		Battery-electric	40	Equipped with left-hand doors for operating into the Harvard bus tunnel; Buses are to be operated out of North Cambridge Garage beginning in December 2026.
2025	New Flyer	XE40		4300–4304	5		Battery-electric	40	Pilot buses will be assigned to Cabot and Charlestown.; Will provide service out of the new Quincy Bus Maintenance Facility in 2027.

=== Future ===
Expected delivery	Manufacturer	Model	Picture	Fleet	Qty.	Propulsion	Length (ft.)	Notes
2026–2027	New Flyer	XE40		4305–4387	83	Battery-electric	40	Contract that was exercised from the July 2024 option order.; Will provide service out of the new Quincy Bus Maintenance Facility in 2027.; Will replace most of the 2008 New Flyer diesel fleet.
2028	New Flyer	XDE40		TBD	65	Hybrid	40	For delivery in 2028; To replace 2014-2015 New Flyer hybrids.

== Facilities ==
MBTA bus routes grouped by the facility they operated from at peak hours in 2016: Albany; Arborway; Cabot; Charlestown; Fellsway; Lynn; Quincy; Somerville; Southampton; Private carriers

MBTA buses are operated out of nine divisions based at eight facilities (the two Charlestown garages share a site).

Name	Address	Routes	Times of Operation
Albany Street	421 Albany Street, Boston	1, 4, 7, 8, 9, 10, 11, 15, 17, 18, 19, 22, 23, 43, 44, 45, 47, 55, 57, 59, 60, 65, 66, 85, 171, 191, 193, 501, 504, 505, 553, 554, 556, 558, CT3	Weekday rush hours and middays
Cabot	275 Dorchester Avenue, South Boston	1, 4, 7, 8, 9, 10, 11, 15, 17, 18, 19, 22, 23, 43, 44, 45, 47, 55, 57, 59, 60, 65, 66, 85, 171, 191, 193, 501, 504, 505, 553, 554, 556, 558, CT3	All operating hours
Arborway	3600 Washington Street, Jamaica Plain	14, 16, 21, 29, 30, 31, 32, 34, 34E, 35, 36, 37, 38, 40, 41, 42, 50, 51, 52, 192	All operating hours
Charlestown (Bennett/Somerville District)	21 Arlington Avenue, Charlestown	61, 62, 64, 67, 68, 69, 70, 71, 73, 74, 75, 76, 77, 78, 80, 83, 86, 87, 88, 350, 351	All operating hours
Charlestown (Charlestown District)	21 Arlington Avenue, Charlestown	89, 90, 91, 92, 93, 94, 95, 96, 97, 99, 100, 101, 104, 105, 106, 108, 109, 110, 111, 112, 131, 132, 134, 137, 194, 354, 411, 430	All operating hours
Fellsway	465 Salem Street, Medford	89, 90, 91, 92, 93, 94, 95, 96, 97, 99, 100, 101, 104, 105, 106, 108, 109, 110, 111, 112, 131, 132, 134, 137, 194, 354, 411, 430	Weekday rush hours and middays
Lynn	985 Western Avenue, Lynn	114, 116, 119, 120, 121, 424, 426, 428, 429, 435, 436, 439, 441, 442, 450, 451, 455, 456, 465	All operating hours
Quincy	954 Hancock Street, Quincy	24, 26, 33, 201, 202, 210, 211, 215, 216, 217, 220, 222, 225, 226, 230, 236, 238, 240, 245	All operating hours
Southampton	230 Southampton Street, Boston	16 (some weekday trips), 28, 39, Silver Line (SL1, SL2, SL3, SL4, SL5, SLW)	All operating hours

=== Replacements ===
The North Cambridge bus facility, which was used by trackless trolleys until March 2022, is to be modified for battery-electric buses. A $27.3 million contract was issued in October 2023, with completion expected in November 2025. As of December 2025, the garage modifications are complete. Bus service from the garage is expected to start in summer 2026.

Quincy Garage is being replaced with a larger facility near Quincy Adams station. The parcel was purchased for $38.2 million in March 2021. Early work, including demolition of an existing building at the site, was completed in mid-2022. Bids in May 2022 came in higher than expected – $360 million versus $280 million – prompting the MBTA to switch to Construction Management at Risk bidding for the project. As of October 2023, the work is expected to cost $299 million, with substantial completion in March 2027. As of March 2026, the garage is expected to open in summer 2027.

A replacement of Arborway Garage on-site is planned. As of 2023, the plans for the new garage will expand the fleet based there from 118 CNG buses to 200 battery-electric buses, including articulated buses for routes 28, 32, and 39. The project was paused in 2025 due to a lack of funding, and would take 5-6 years to design and build once funded. State funding for the garage was announced in October 2025 as part of an $850 million transfer from the Commonwealth Transportation Fund to the MBTA. As of March 2026, the project is planned to be fully funded in the FY 2027-2031 Capital Investment Plan (CIP). The new garage will support a fully battery-electric fleet, though it is planned to initially operate with a mix of battery-electric buses and hybrids.

In July 2022, the MBTA indicated plans to purchase an adjacent parcel to expand Southampton Garage. In August 2025, the MBTA purchased a site in Medford to replace Fellsway and Lynn garages.

== Private operators ==
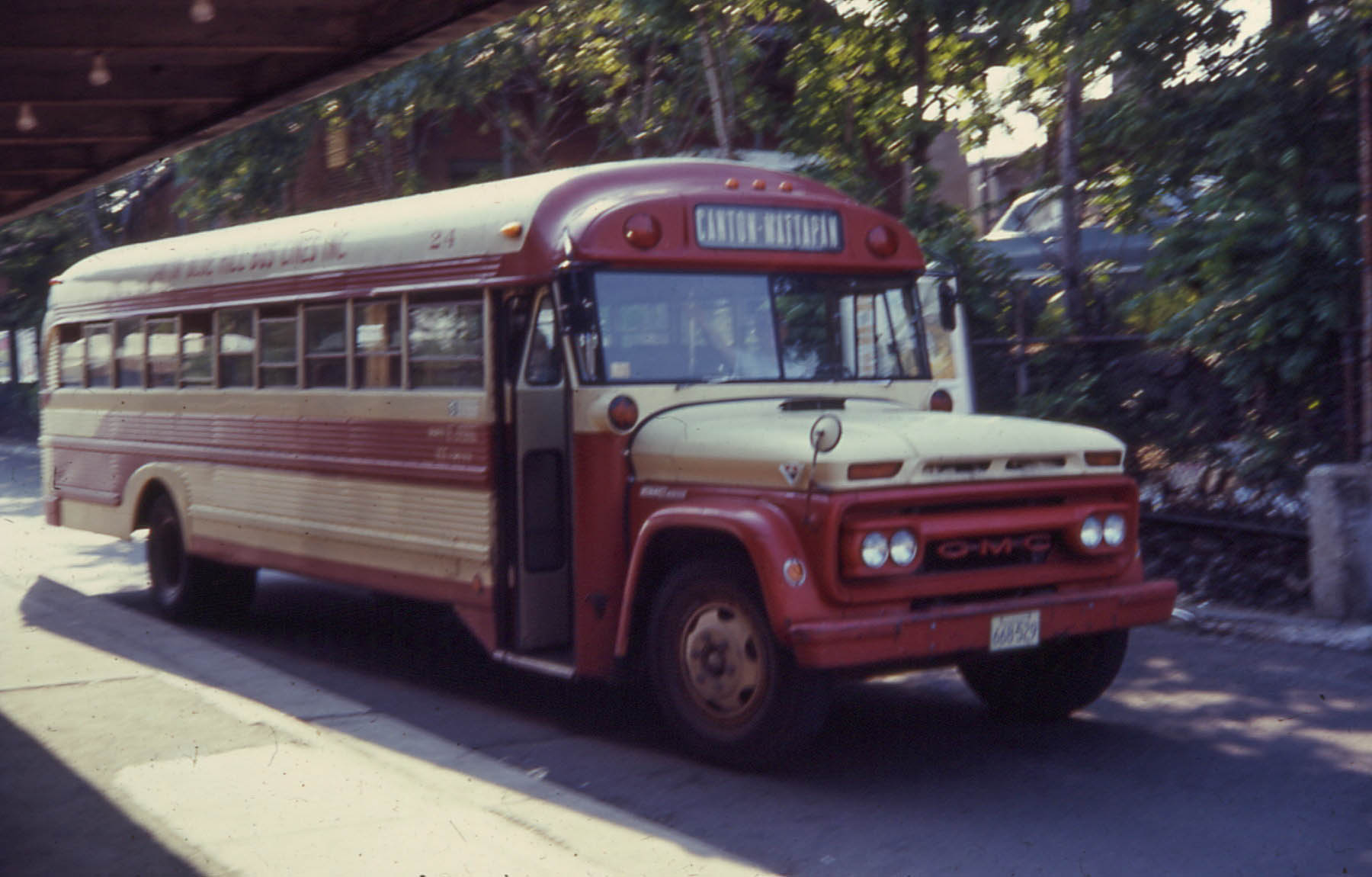
A Blue Hill Bus Lines vehicle on the Canton–Mattapan route, now the #716 route, in 1967

Most local bus routes in Massachusetts outside the immediate MBTA operating area are operated by the state's other regional transit authorities (RTAs). However, some routes that connect with MBTA bus or subway service are operated by outside private contractors with partial subsidy by the MBTA.

Four routes – the 712, 713, 714, and 716 – are numbered like other MBTA buses. The four routes are primarily commuter routes which connect with other MBTA services at their inbound terminals. They were taken over from various private operators (Rapid Transit Inc. for the 712/713, Nantasket Transportation for the 714, and Hudson Bus Lines for the 716). The 712 and 713 use MBTA-provided buses; the other routes do not.

Two municipalities contract with outside operators for local circulator routes with partial MBTA subsidy. Lexington runs a three-route system, while a nonprofit shuttle is run in Boston's Mission Hill neighborhood. Those routes appear on MBTA system maps and connect with MBTA services at designated transfer points, but are numbered separately and do not accept MBTA passes.

== Bus lanes ==
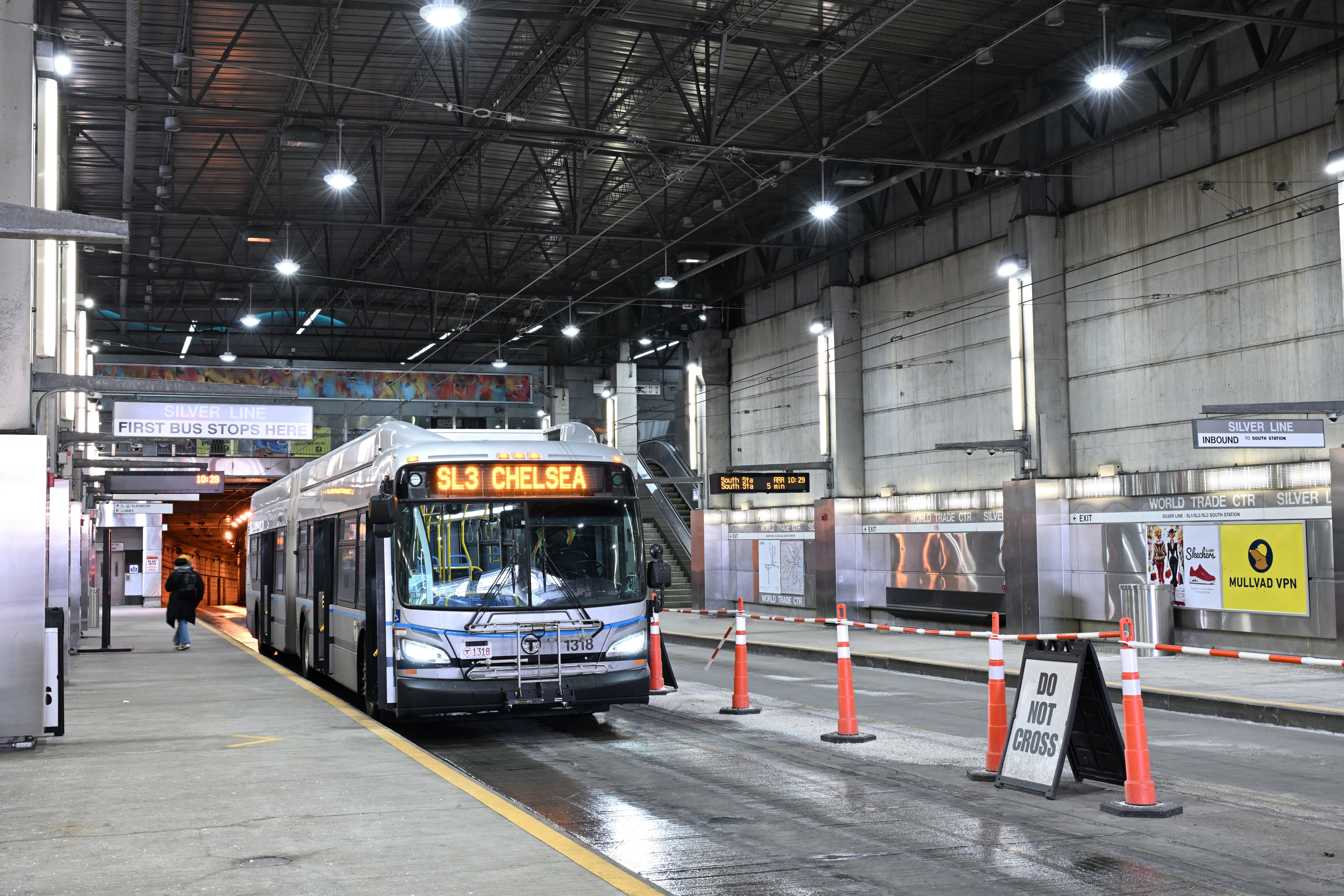
World Trade Center station in the South Boston Piers Transitway

Several sections of dedicated right-of-way for MBTA buses have been opened in the 21st century. Two sections of the Silver Line have off-street busways: The 2004-opened 1.2-mile (1.9 km) South Boston Piers Transitway tunnel in the Seaport (used by the SL1, SL2, SL3, and SLW), and a 2018-opened 1.1-mile (1.8 km) surface busway in Chelsea used by the SL3. A direct ramp to the Ted Williams Tunnel is proposed for use by the SL1 and SL3.

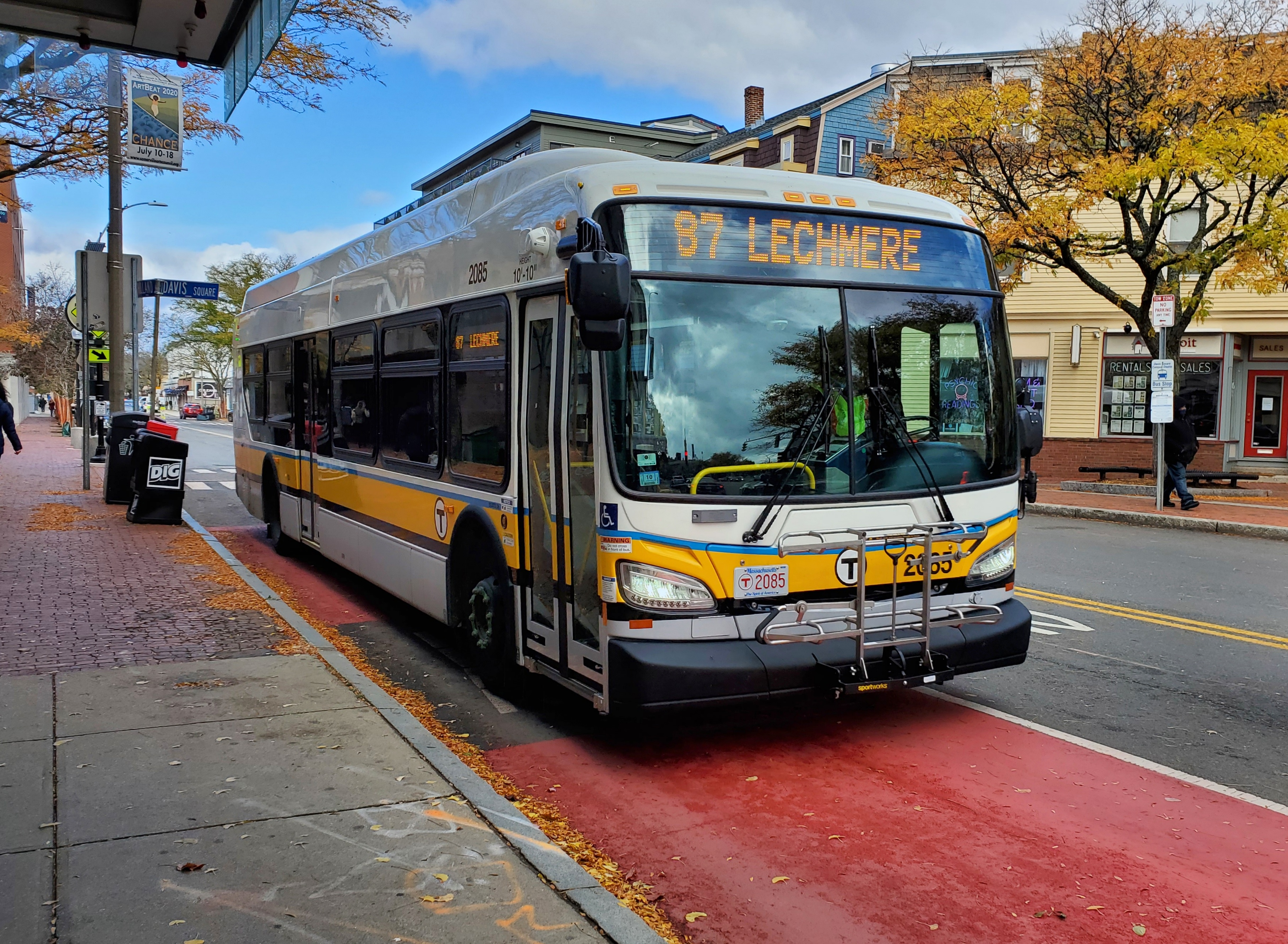
Route 87 bus at the Holland Avenue queue jump at Davis Square in 2020

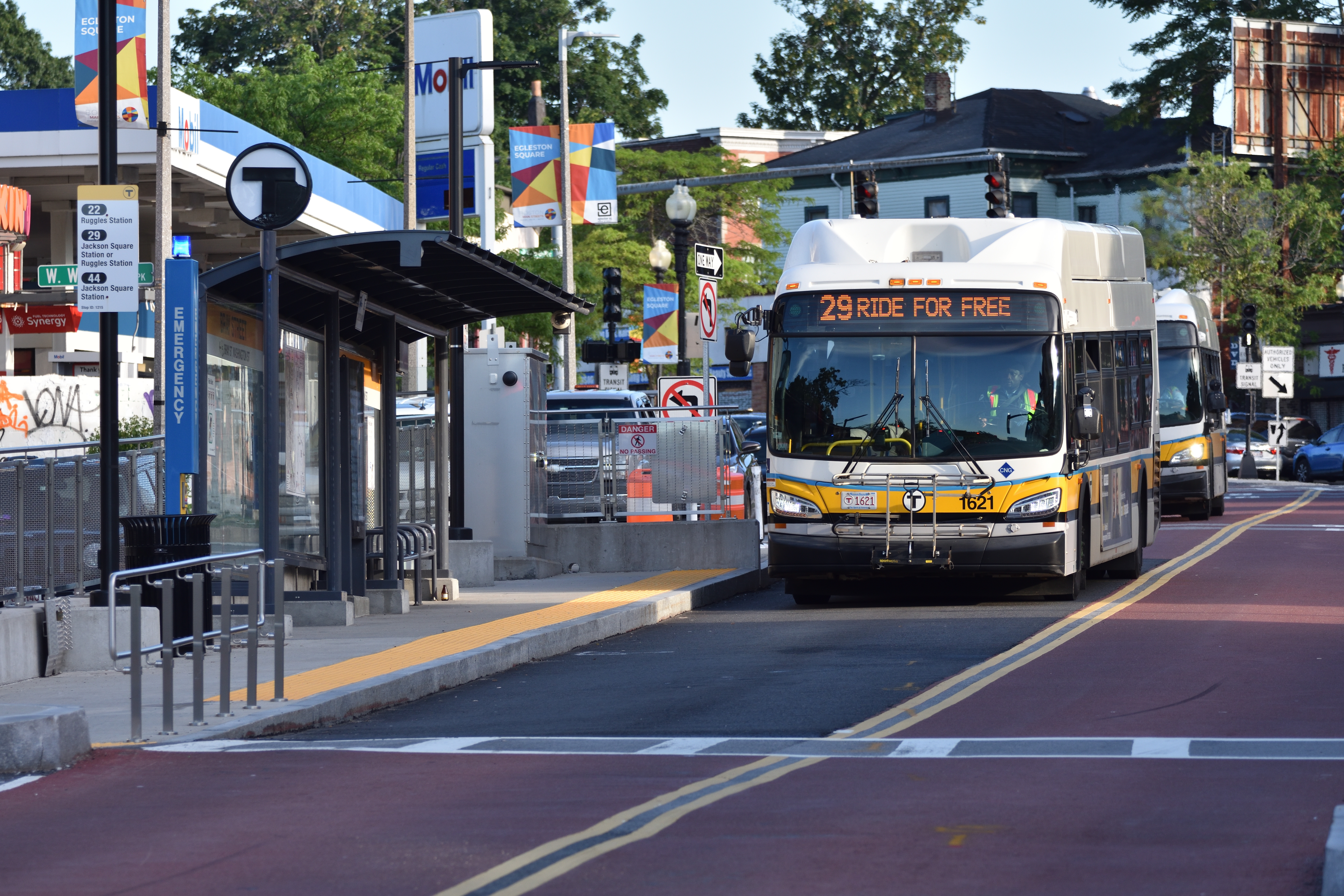
Route 29 bus on the Columbus Avenue bus lanes

A number of dedicated bus lanes on surface streets are also in use:

- Washington Street, Boston:
  - 1.6 miles (2.6 km) between Melnea Cass Boulevard and Kneeland Street (including a short southbound contraflow section), with an additional 0.3 miles (0.48 km) northbound-only between Stuart Street and Temple Place. The lanes are used by Silver Line routes SL4 and SL5, as well as local routes 8, 10, and 11. The southern section was opened in 2002 with the introduction of Silver Line service; the portion north of Herald Street (northbound) and Marginal Street (southbound) was added in mid-2020 along with a lane on Temple Place.
  - 0.9 miles (1.4 km) of northbound morning-peak-only bus/bike lane between Roslindale and Forest Hills was added in June 2018 following a test that May. The section is used by routes 30, 34, 34E, 35, 36, 37, 40, 50, and 51. 1.5 miles (2.4 km) of southbound evening-peak-only lane was added in early 2021.
- Essex Street, Boston: Two eastbound segments totaling 0.2 miles (0.32 km), opened in 2009 for use by the SL4.
- Broadway, Sweetser Circle, and Main Street, Everett: A 1.1-mile (1.8 km) morning-peak-only southbound bus lane on Broadway from Henry Street to Sweetser Circle (routes 97, 104, 109, 110, 112) was opened in 2017 after a 2016 test. A 0.4-mile (0.64 km) northbound evening-peak-only lane on Broadway from Sweetser Circle to Chelsea Street, a 0.15-mile (0.24 km) northbound evening-peak-only lane on Main Street from Sweetser Circle to Oakes Street (routes 99, 105, 106), and an all-day lane around Sweetser Circle were added in October 2020.
- Prospect Street, Somerville: a 0.1-mile (0.16 km) northbound bus/bike lane (routes 85, 91) opened in 2017.
- Mount Auburn Street and Belmont Street, Cambridge and Watertown: Three segments totaling 0.6 miles (0.97 km), installed in October 2018 for routes 71 and 73.
- Massachusetts Avenue, Cambridge and Arlington: 0.5 miles (0.80 km) of southbound bus lane from Sidney Street to Memorial Drive for route 1, opened in November 2018. 0.3 miles (0.48 km) of southbound morning-peak-only bus/bike lane from Varnum Street to Alewife Brook Parkway for route 77 was installed in October 2019 after a successful test a year before. 0.5 miles (0.8 km) of bus lanes between Dudley Street and Alewife Brook Parkway (route 77) opened in November 2021.
- Sullivan Square, Boston: Three short sections of bus-only turn lane on Beacham Street (routes 85, 91, 109), Maffa Way (89, 90, 95, 101), and Main Street (92, 93, 104, 105, 109) for buses entering Sullivan Square station, installed as part of a 2018–2019 reconfiguration of the station. Additional segments on Broadway, Mystic Avenue, and Lombardi Street were added around 2025 as part of a bridge reconstruction project.
- Brighton Avenue, Boston: 0.6 miles (1.0 km) of bus/bike lanes between Commonwealth Avenue (Packards Corner) and Union Square, used by routes 57, 57A, and 66. The eastbound lane was opened in June 2019, followed by the westbound lane that October.
- Broadway, Somerville: 0.9 miles (1.4 km) of bus/bike lanes between Magoun Square and Fellsway West for routes 89 and 101, opened in August 2019.
- North Washington Street, Boston: 0.15 miles (0.24 km) of southbound bus/bike lane (route 92, 93, 111, 426, and 428) from Causeway Street to Beverly Street opened in August 2019. A 0.3-mile (0.48 km) northbound bus lane from Sudbury Street to Causeway Street opened in August 2021. The northbound lane was removed during repaving in July 2025.
- Summer Street, Boston: 0.14 miles (0.23 km) of westbound bus lane between Dorchester Avenue and Atlantic Avenue for routes 4 and 7, opened in October 2019. An additional 1.4 miles (2.3 km) of bus/truck lanes between Dorchester Avenue and East First Street opened as a six-month pilot in September 2023. In September 2024, the city indicated that the pilot had been unsuccessful and that the bus/truck lanes were to be removed. Transit travel times did not improve due to large numbers of private vehicles illegally using the lanes. Transit lanes on the corridor would be considered later with the planned frequency increase and extension of route 7 as part of the bus network redesign, as well as the potential for automated bus lane enforcement.
- Davis Square, Somerville: queue jumps on Holland Street (routes 87 and 88) and College Avenue (89, 94, 96) opened in 2020.
- Broadway, Chelsea: a 0.2-mile (0.32 km) westbound bus lane from 5th Street to 3rd Street for routes 111, 114, 116, and 117 opened in November 2020.
- Tobin Memorial Bridge: 1.1 miles (1.8 km) of westbound bus lane for route 111 (a 12-month pilot) opened in December 2020.
- Malden: a 0.2-mile (0.32 km) westbound bus/bike lane opened on Florence Street (routes 99, 104, 105) in December 2020, followed by bidirectional lanes on Centre Street (routes 99, 104, 105, 106, 108, 131, 137, 411, 430) in 2022.
- Washington Street, Somerville: several queue jumps and sections of bus/bike lanes (routes 85, 86, 91) were added in 2020-21, with further additions in 2024.
- North Common Street, Lynn: 0.5 miles (0.8 km) of bus/bike lanes for routes 426/426W and 455 opened in April 2021.
- Mystic Avenue, Somerville and Medford: a 1.9-mile (3.1 km) pilot of a morning-peak-only southbound bus lane for route 95 opened in June 2021.
- Columbus Avenue, Boston: 0.7 miles (1.1 km) of center-running lanes between Walnut Street and Jackson Square (routes 22, 29, 44) with boarding islands opened in October 2021 – the first center bus lanes in New England.
- Broadway, Revere: 1.0 mile (1.6 km) pilot of southbound morning peak bus/bike lane from Revere Street to near Revere Beach Parkway for routes 116, 117, 119, and 411 opened in November 2021. It was made permanent in August 2022, with additional markings installed in September 2023. The lane was extended south under Revere Beach Parkway to the Chelsea border in June 2024.
- Western Avenue in Lynn: 0.4 miles (0.6 km) of bus lanes between Ida Street and the Belden Bly Bridge (routes 424, 450/450W, 455) opened in 2021–22.
- Route 2 eastbound ramp to Alewife station: 0.25 miles (0.4 km) of bus lane for routes 62, 67, 76, and 78 was opened in November 2021.
- Interstate 93 north of Boston: A two-year pilot began in December 2021 for use of the breakdown lane by MBTA buses (route 354), MVRTA buses, and Logan Express buses between Somerville and I-95. The lanes can be used during peak periods when traffic speeds are below 35 miles per hour (56 km/h).
- Dedicated lanes were added on several streets in Boston during the August–September 2022 closure of the Orange Line, of which four were made permanent: Boylston Street from Ring Road to Clarendon Street (routes 9, 39, and 55), Clarendon from Boylston to Columbus Avenue (39 and 55), St. James Avenue from near Berkeley Street to Dartmouth Street (9, 10, 39, 55, 501, and 504), and Huntington Avenue from Brigham Circle to Gainsborough Street (39 and 66). In February 2025, mayor Michelle Wu announced that the Boylston Street lane would be removed.
- Washington Street, Brookline: 0.25 miles (0.4 km) of bus lanes at Brookline Village (routes 60, 65, 66) were installed in June 2024 as a one-year pilot.
- 2nd Street, Everett and Chelsea: 0.9 miles (1.4 km) of westbound bus lane and a shorter eastbound bus lane for route 104 were added in October–November 2024.

An additional 1.0 mile (1.6 km) of center lanes on Columbus Avenue and Tremont Street between Jackson Square and Ruggles was planned for construction in 2025–26. Center bus lanes are also funded for Lynnway in Lynn, and proposed for Blue Hill Avenue in Boston between Grove Hall and Mattapan. Additional lanes in Boston announced in 2020 but not yet implemented include Malcolm X Boulevard between Roxbury Crossing and Nubian Square, Warren Street between Nubian Square and Grove Hall, and Hyde Park Avenue between Forest Hills and Metropolitan Avenue.

In January 2025, the state legislature passed a bill authorizing the MBTA and regional transit agencies to use automated camera enforcement of illegal parking in bus lanes and bus stops. The MBTA proposed regulations and began procurement of an enforcement system later that year. Enforcement with advisory notices on route SL4 and SL5 began on October 1, 1026, followed by warnings and fines on January 1, 2027.
