= South Boston Railroad =

Map of the lines of the South Boston (in yellow) and other horsecar companies operating in Boston in 1886

The South Boston Railroad was a street railway company that operated in Boston, Massachusetts, in the mid-nineteenth century. It provided horsecar service for passengers traveling between South Boston and the city downtown.

== History ==
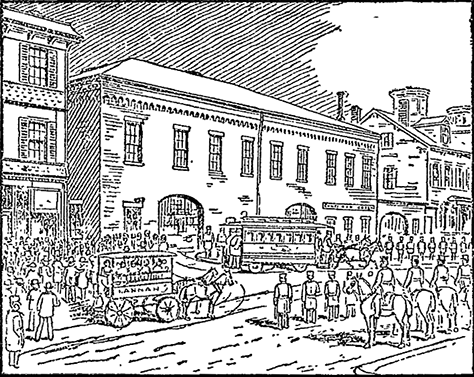
Drawing of a South Boston Railroad horsecar departing from the Broadway Carhouse while under police guard, during the 1887 strike

Originally formed as the Broadway Railroad, the company was incorporated on April 29, 1854, and commenced operations four years later. The original route granted to the railway ran from South Boston Point (now City Point), at the eastern extremity of Fourth Street, to a point near the intersection of Broadway and Turnpike Street (now Dorchester Avenue), where it merged with the tracks of the Dorchester Avenue Railroad. In 1868 the company changed its name to the South Boston Railroad.

By the 1860s the South Boston was one of the four principal street railways of the Boston area, together with the Metropolitan, Union/Cambridge, and Middlesex. Of the four, it was generally on the smaller size, with a passenger count of 4.3 million in 1869 and 6.1 million a decade later.

In early 1887 the railroad experienced a worker's strike that lasted for over a month, causing significant disruptions in service.

In 1887 the West End Street Railway gained a controlling interest in the South Boston, and the railroad was formally consolidated into the West End on November 12 of that year.

== Statistics ==
FY	Track miles operated	Miles run	Passengers carried	Passenger receipts	Ref.
1862 ^{1}	4.29	251,022	1,412,034	$68,787	
1867	6.85	468,857	3,358,867	$186,242	
1872	7.68	696,422	5,509,457	$290,789	
1877	10.36	905,039	5,548,609	$281,765	
1882	14.33	1,332,348	9,072,394	$440,215	
1887	19.66	1,606,057	11,085,052	$539,440	

1. For eleven months only.
