= Dorchester Railroad =

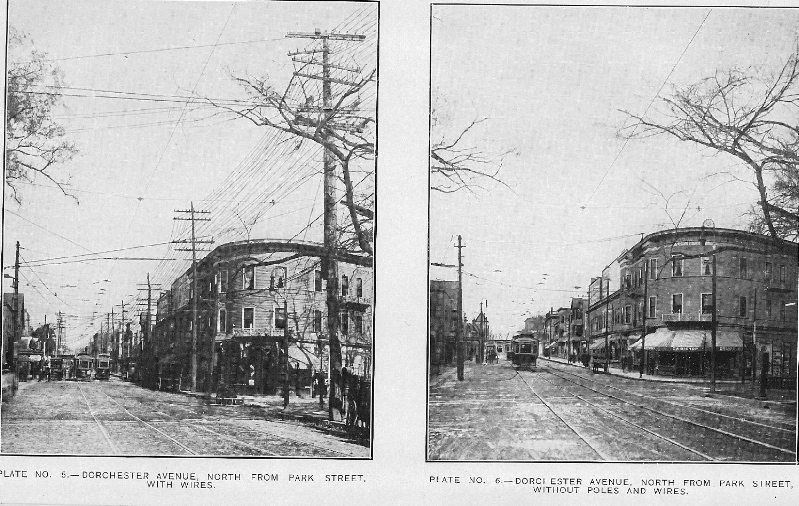
Looking north on Dorchester Avenue in Fields Corner, c. 1910

The Dorchester Railroad and Dorchester Extension Railroad was a horse car line in Boston, Massachusetts, in the late 19th century. It ran from Downtown Boston south to Milton, primarily along Dorchester Avenue on the old Dorchester Turnpike. For several years, it was operated by Gore, Rose and Company, owned by David Gore and George Rose, because the original company could not afford to run it.

== History ==
The Dorchester Avenue Railroad was chartered on April 29, 1854, opened in spring 1857, and bought by the Dorchester Railroad (chartered April 29, 1855) in January 1858. The Dorchester Extension Railroad was chartered on February 18, 1855. Both were leased to Gore, Rose and Company, which operated the line from June 1, 1858, to 1862.

Both companies were purchased by the Metropolitan Railroad on October 1, 1863.

An 1871 map shows the downtown end continuing from Dorchester Avenue along Federal Street to Dewey Square, and then along Broad Street, which is now partly Atlantic Avenue, to a terminus at State Street, with no connections to any other lines.

The railroad later became a surface trolley line of the West End Street Railway and then the Boston Elevated Railway. It no longer carries a single service (which would now be bus) because the Red Line subway parallels Dorchester Avenue for its entire length.

The railroad was one of the first street railways in Boston, coming soon after the Cambridge Railroad, which opened March 1856.
