= Middlesex Railroad =

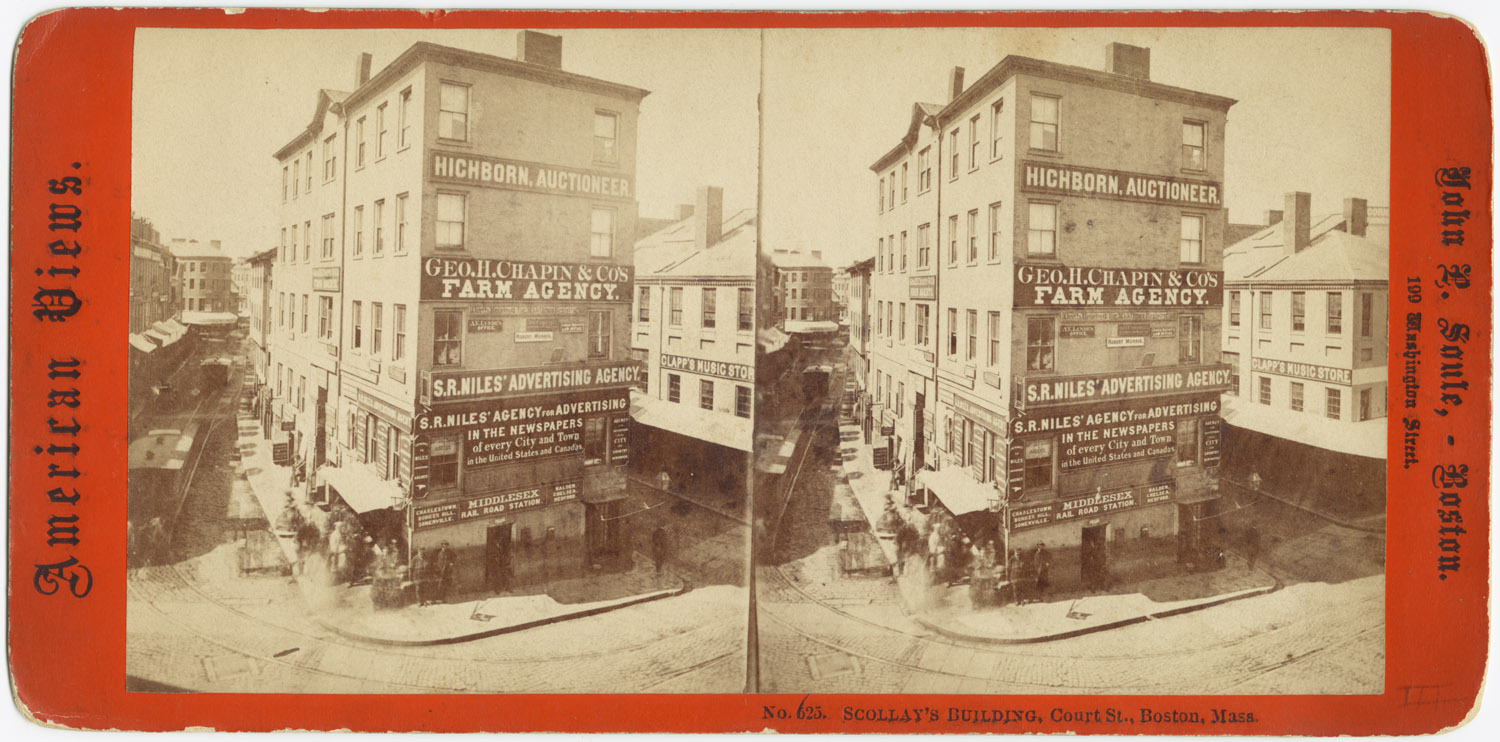
Scollay Square in downtown Boston, showing sign for "Middlesex Rail Road Station," prior to 1870

The Middlesex Railroad (later renamed to the Boston Consolidated Street Railway) was an early street railway company that operated in the Boston, Massachusetts area in the mid-nineteenth century. It provided horsecar service for passengers traveling between Charlestown/lower Middlesex County and downtown Boston.

== History ==
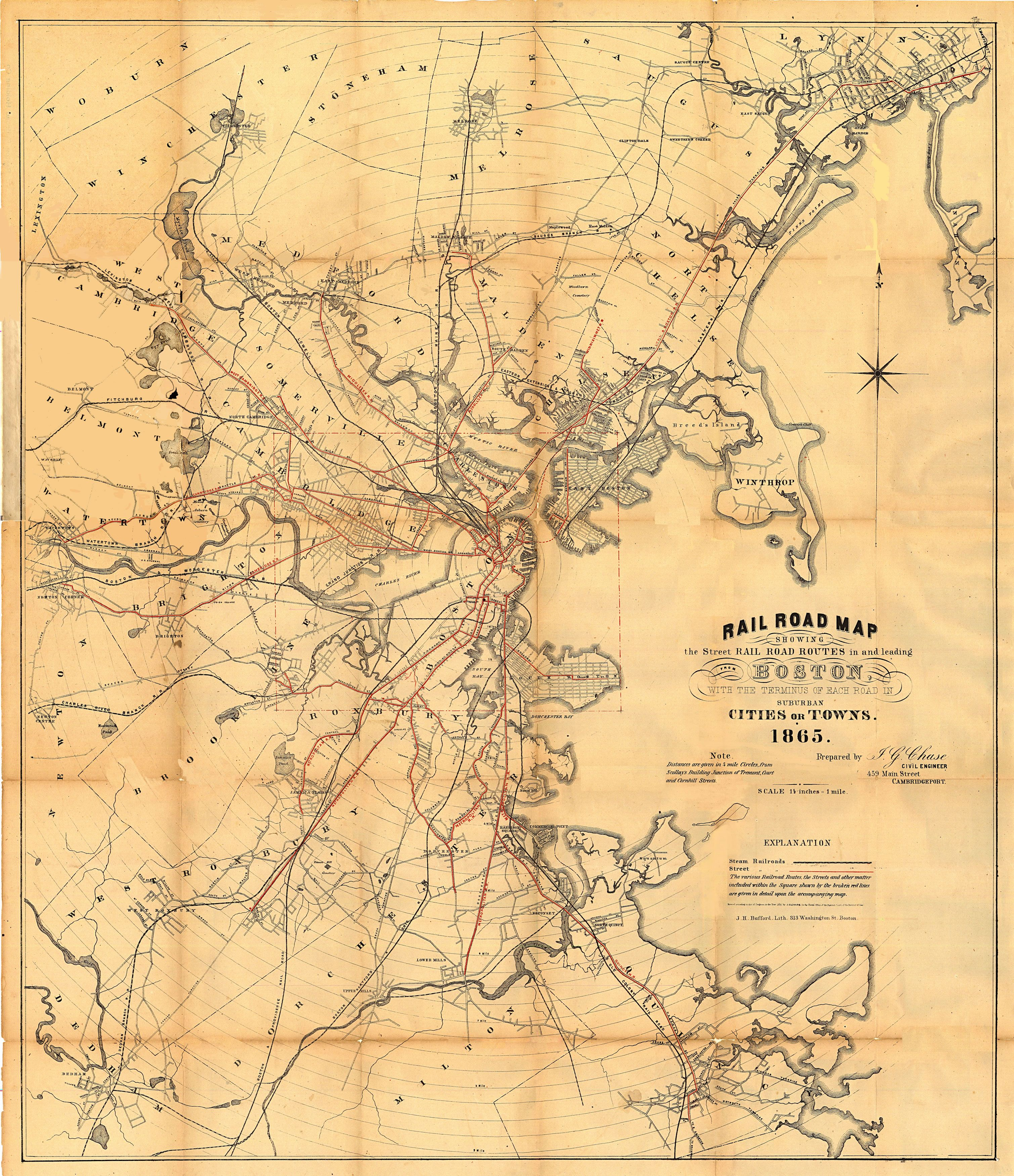
Map of streetcar lines in Boston (in red) in 1865, showing the routes of the Middlesex (north-central)

Map of the lines of the Middlesex (in orange) and other horsecar companies operating in Boston in 1886. Later that year the company consolidated with the Highland Street Railway (dark blue)

The Middlesex Railroad was founded on April 29, 1854 by an act of the Massachusetts state legislature, with Asa Fisk, Richard Downing, and David Kimball being the original corporators. The initial route proposed for the company was for a line running from one or more points in Somerville down to Charlestown Square (now City Square) in Charlestown, then continuing into Boston via the Warren Bridge and proceeding as far as Haymarket Square before returning to Charlestown via the Charles River Bridge. The Somerville portion of the line went unrealized (with the rights to build in that town eventually being conveyed to the Somerville Horse Railroad), but work on the Charlestown and Boston components of the route was commenced in October 1856, and on March 6 of the following year the first car was run from Charlestown Neck to the corner of Stillman and Charlestown (now North Washington) streets in Boston.

In its first years the Middlesex recorded no direct passenger traffic as its road was leased to the Malden and Melrose Railroad, which furnished the equipment and handled operations. Eventually, however, the Middlesex acquired a controlling interest in the Malden and Melrose, and at the end of March 1862 the latter agreed to provide the Middlesex with a forty-two year grant for exclusive use of its tracks. At the same time, the company stepped into leases formerly held by the Malden and Melrose, by which it additionally gained control of the lines of the Medford and Charlestown, the Somerville Horse, and the Boston and Chelsea railroads. Use of the Boston and Chelsea was soon however transferred to the Lynn and Boston Railroad, while operation of the Somerville Horse was eventually divided with the Union Railroad.

By the mid-1860s the Middlesex constituted one of the four principal street railways of the Boston area, together with the Metropolitan, Union/Cambridge, and South Boston. In 1865 the company reported an annual passenger count of 2.8 million (excluding passengers counted by lessor lines), which increased to 4.4 million by 1875 and 7.6 million in 1885.

In 1870 the Middlesex consolidated with the Suburban Railroad Company, and a decade later it did the same with the Medford and Charlestown. The lease for the Somerville Horse, meanwhile, was assigned to the Union in 1876.

In August 1886 the Middlesex and the Highland Street Railway agreed to consolidate and form the Boston Consolidated Street Railway, with Charles Edward Powers of the Middlesex serving as president and Moody Merrill of the Highland as vice president. With the merger, the new company became the second largest street railway operating in Boston (after the Metropolitan), and the addition of the Highland lines extended operations southward into the neighborhoods of the South End and Dorchester.

In 1887 the West End Street Railway gained a controlling interest in the Boston Consolidated as part of its general plan to unite the public streetcars of Boston under one company. The railroad was formally merged into the West End on November 12 of that year.
