= Metropolitan Railroad (Boston) =

Metropolitan Railroad Company
- Founded: May 21, 1853; 173 years ago
- Defunct: November 12, 1887; 138 years ago
- Fate: Consolidated
- Successor: West End Street Railway
- Headquarters: 16 Kilby Street, Boston, Massachusetts, U.S.
- Area served: Boston, Roxbury, Dorchester, West Roxbury, East Boston, Brookline, Milton, & Chelsea
- Key people: Calvin A. Richards (president, 1874–1887)
- Revenue: $2,200,248.02 (FY 1887)
- Operating income: $338,817.81 (FY 1887)
- Number of employees: 1,733 (FY 1887)

Metropolitan Railroad was an early street railway in the Greater Boston, Massachusetts area. Formed in 1853 to provide horsecar service between Boston and Roxbury, it quickly expanded to become the largest railway company in the region, with operations over more than ninety miles of track and an annual ridership of over forty-two million passengers per year. It ended operations in 1887 as a result of the consolidation plan which united nearly all Boston streetcar lines into West End Street Railway.

== History ==
=== Formation ===
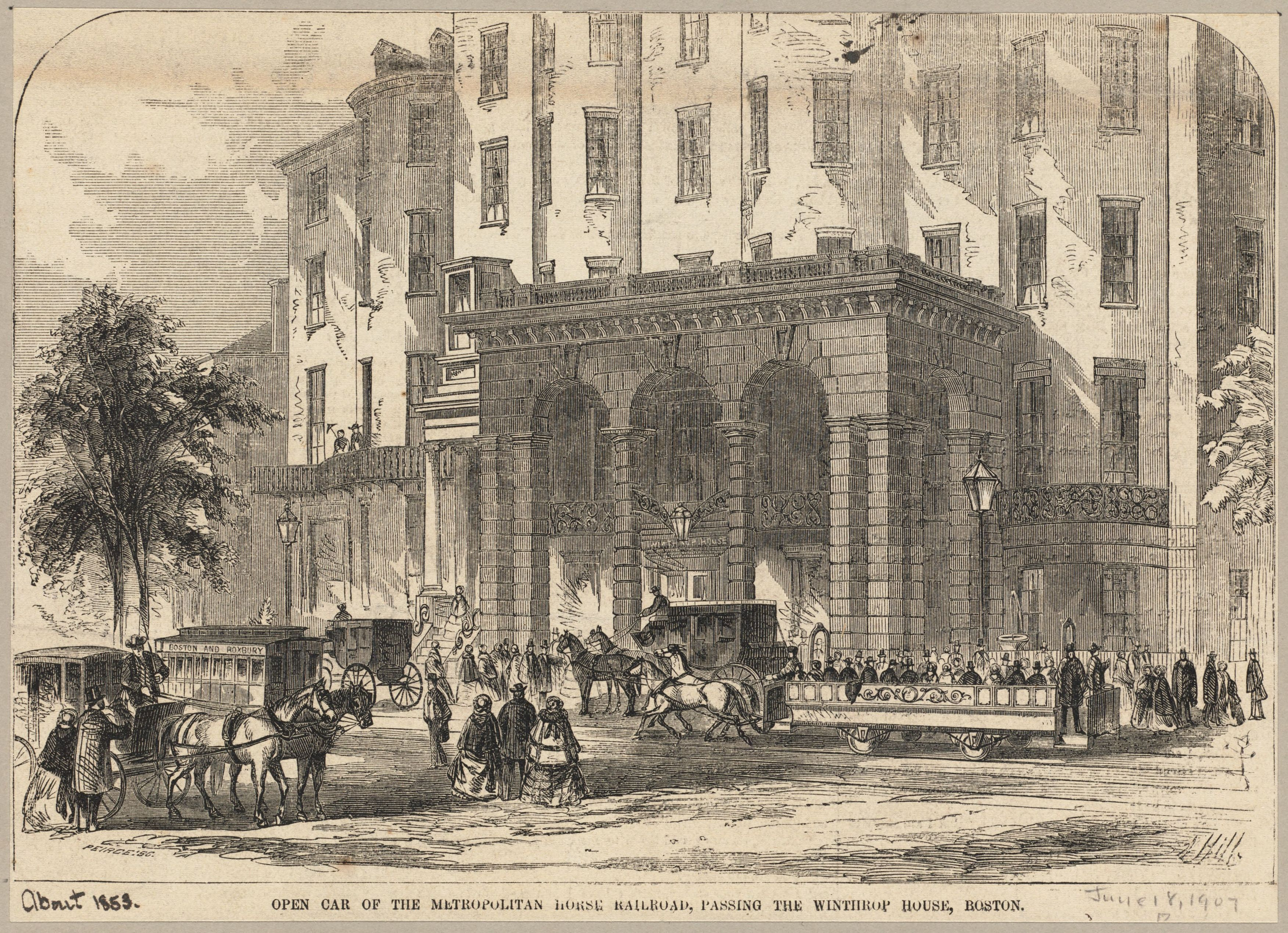
An 1857 engraving of an open air Metropolitan car at the corner of Boylston and Tremont streets

Metropolitan Railroad was an early pioneer in an effort to bring street railway service to Boston, which replaced the older horse-drawn omnibus lines which had come to be viewed as expensive and unreliable. The company received its charter on May 21, 1853, by Massachusetts General Court, by which it was enabled to build a rail line connecting downtown Boston with the then-independent town of Roxbury. John P. Ober, a former Boston alderman, served as first president of the new organization.

Although Metropolitan was one of the first railway companies established in the Boston area, defects in its charter and community opposition to its proposed lines significantly delayed commencement of its operations. The company was unable to secure approval to lay tracks between Dover (now East Berkeley) and Boylston streets until late 1856, by which time a competing line, Cambridge Railroad, already began providing railway service between Boston and Cambridge. Eventually, however, the company was able to complete a single track as far as Boylston Street, and on September 18, 1856, municipal authorities of Roxbury boarded a car and were taken for a ride along the line.

The original Metropolitan route ran from Boylston Market, at the corner of Boylston and Washington streets, to Eliot Square in Roxbury via Washington Street. On October 3, the route was extended along Tremont Street as far north as Scollay Square (now Government Center), returning along Washington Street and Harrison Avenue, and on October 11 a double track was completed as far as the Tremont House near King's Chapel. The line, which offered service between the two municipalities at a speed of seven miles per hour, quickly proved to be a popular one, and in its first full year of operations almost four million passengers were carried on 116,560 trips. By statute, fares for the line within the city of Boston were initially capped at five cents per trip.

=== Expansion ===
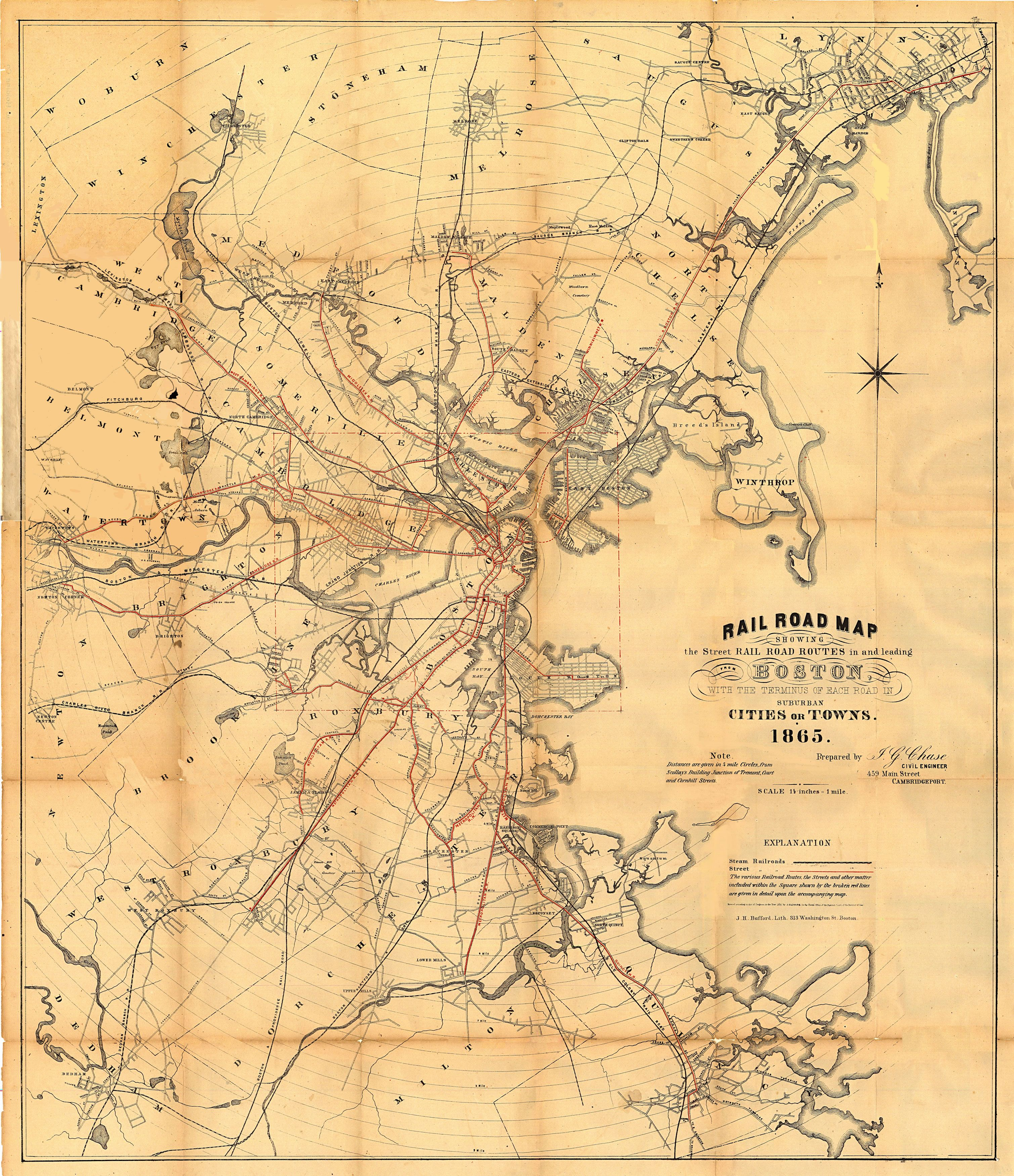
Map of streetcar lines in Boston (in red) in 1865, showing the routes of the Metropolitan (south)

Over the next three decades, Metropolitan Railroad received grants to lay its lines on dozens of additional locations in Boston and Roxbury, including in downtown and the West and South Ends; at the same time, it undertook a strategy of acquiring or leasing lines of several competing railways, enabling it to significantly expand its foothold in Boston and a number of surrounding towns in the process. Within a few years of its incorporation it had cemented its status as the largest street railway company in Boston, ahead of the other principal railroads of the Union/Cambridge, South Boston, and Middlesex.

In 1858, Metropolitan was authorized by the state legislature to acquire West Roxbury Railroad, which held the right to provide service between Roxbury and West Roxbury, In 1859, it received similar permission to purchase the franchise and property of Brookline Railroad. In 1863 the company expanded into Dorchester with absorption of Dorchester Railway and Dorchester Expansion Railway, which collectively connected that town to Boston with lines along Dorchester Avenue and several other streets, and a year later Dorchester and Roxbury Railroad was also acquired.

In 1864, Metropolitan bid on Suffolk Railroad, which operated in East Boston and held an East Boston-Downtown line running via ferryboats to Hanover Street in the North End and then to Scollay Square. The company was successful in absorbing the rail lines of the Suffolk, but its attempts to secure the ferry lines were stymied by Boston city officials. In 1871, it was directed to remove tracks connecting to the ferry terminals.

In 1865, Chlesea and East Boston Railroad, which was authorized to connect East Boston and Chelsea via the Meridian Street Bridge, was absorbed by Metropolitan. In 1868, Brookline and Back Bay Street Railway, running from Brookline Village to Roxbury Crossing, was taken over. In 1878, Boston and West Roxbury Railroad, which was already leased its line to Metropolitan several years earlier, was formally consolidated with the company.

=== Late 19th century ===
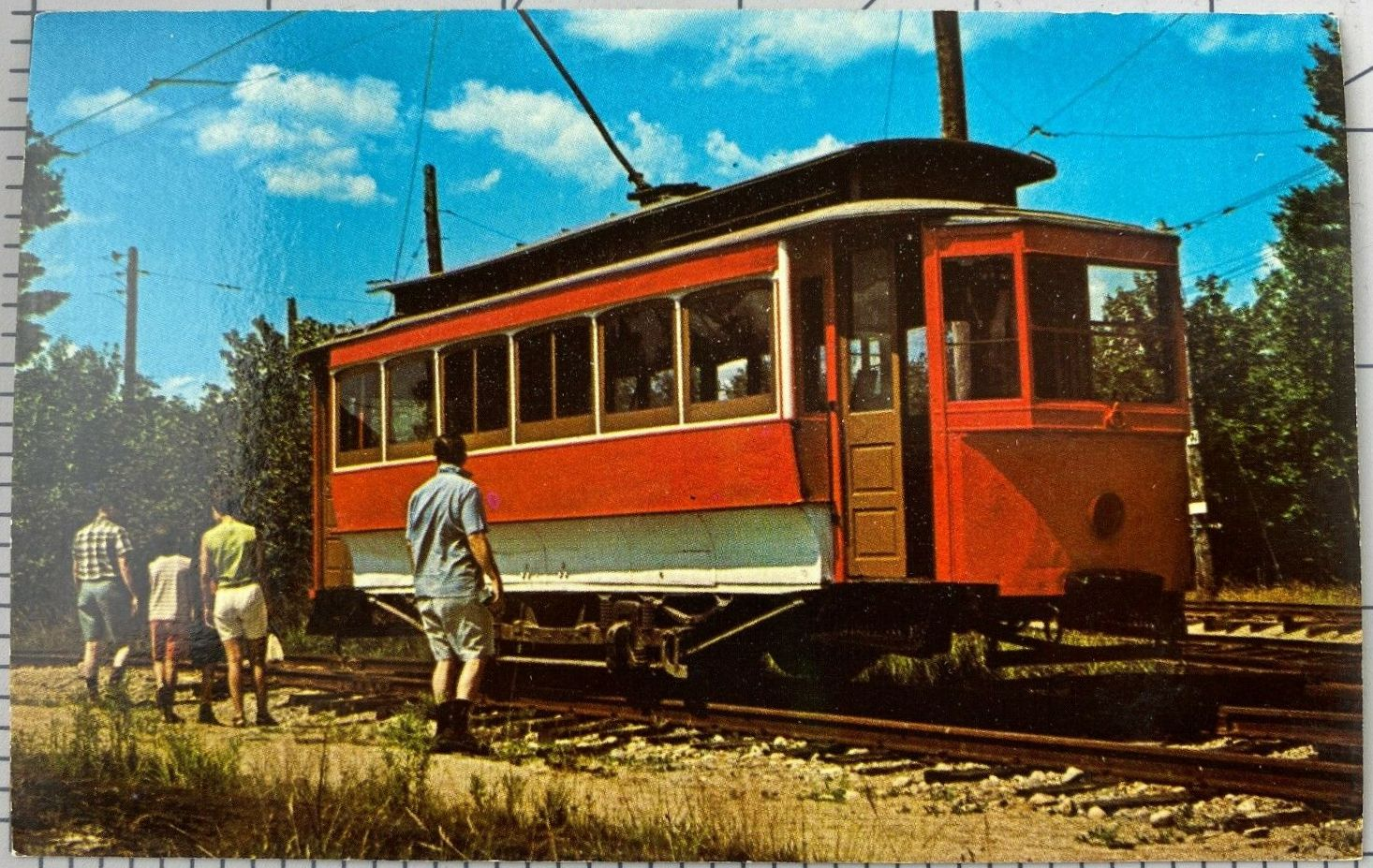
Boston Elevated Railway work car #724, formerly Metropolitan horsecar #804, at Seashore Trolley Museum

Complaints that Metropolitan was engaging in monopolistic behavior eventually led to calls for reform. In 1872, Highland Street Railway was chartered with an avowed purpose of competing with Metropolitan for business around its original Boston and Roxbury lines. Over the next several years, the two railway companies were major rivals, with Highland usage of Metropolitan's tracks becoming a point of major contention. At the same time, Highland constructed a new line along Shawmut Avenue to compete with Metropolitan and gradually expanded its presence in Roxbury, Dorchester, and the South End.

In 1874, Calvin A. Richards, who previously served for eight months on Metropolitan's board of directors, was elected as Metropolitan's new president. A newcomer to the railway industry, Richards' firm style of management quickly enabled Metropolitan to recover from what had previously been a poor period of performance, and Metropolitan's financial situation significantly improved. Richards served as president for 13 years, making him by far the longest-serving Metropolitan executive.

=== November 1887 consolidation ===
Map of the lines of the Metropolitan (in green) and other horsecar companies operating in Boston in 1886

In fall 1886, two new street railway companies were formed, West End Street Railway and Suburban Street Railway. The original incorporators started as a land company, with the goal of connecting and expanding the Boston and Brookline portions of Beacon Street in order to enhance value of the land they held along that route. In order to further increase marketability of the land, the two railways were formed to provide transportation to the area, and the West End Railway was granted the right to enter Boston through the avenue and Back Bay.

Metropolitan directors viewed the emergence of West End as a threat to their business, and in order to counter this new rival they decided to make an effort to expand their operations. Metropolitan initially made an attempt to take over South Boston Railroad, which at that time was already running more car miles on Metropolitan tracks than on its own, and when this failed it alternatively filed proposals to extend its own lines into South Boston peninsula. Talks with directors of Cambridge Railroad were also initiated, and in February 1887 the two railways announced an agreement to unite into a new consolidated company, which would be among the largest in the country once completed.

These actions by Metropolitan quickly drew alarm from West End managers. In response, they suddenly made a bid to acquire a controlling interest in all of railway companies of Boston, excluding only Lynn and Boston. Within a short time, majority positions in Metropolitan and other companies were secured. In June 1887, the state legislature passed a bill allowing West End to consolidate with any other railway operating in Boston.

Shortly after West End Bill's passage, managers of West End made an offer to remaining Metropolitan shareholders for 1.25 shares of West End 8% preferred stock in exchange for each Metropolitan share held. Metropolitan's board, which had become an advocate for consolidation, recommended acceptance of the proposal, and Richards decided to set a precedent by being the first to exchange his shares.

In November 1887, consolidation was formally completed, with West End absorbing Metropolitan, together with South Boston and Consolidated, successor to Middlesex and Highland railroads, on November 12, and absorption of Cambridge following soon after on November 19.

== Statistics ==
FY	Track miles operated	Miles run	Passengers carried	Passenger receipts	Ref.
1862	21.33	1,245,025	6,163,877	$292,205	
1867	42.10	1,823,175	12,366,831	$714,991	
1872	43.54	2,438,565	17,459,102	$959,177	
1877	52.72	3,792,653	23,398,223	$1,138,295	
1882	74.76	5,428,940	32,242,634	$1,612,976	
1887	90.88	7,081,634	42,970,289	$2,113,132	
