= West End Street Railway =

Former streetcar company serving the Boston metro area, Massachusetts, USA (1887-1922)

West End Street Railway Company
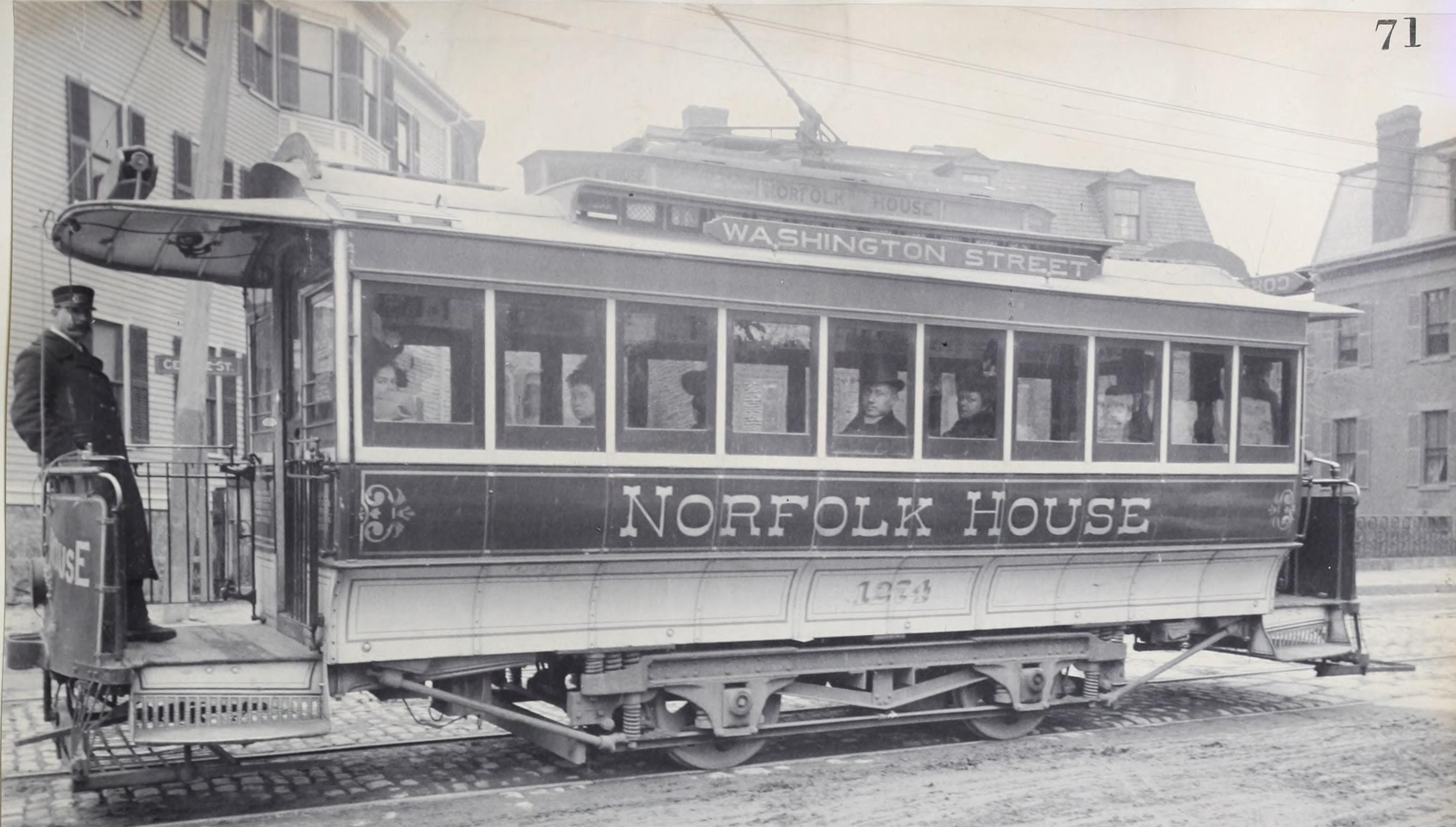
- West End railway car along Centre Street, Roxbury in 1897
- Predecessor: Metropolitan, Cambridge, Consolidated, and South Boston railroads
- Founded: January 22, 1887; 139 years ago
- Defunct: June 10, 1922; 104 years ago
- Fate: Consolidated
- Successor: Boston Elevated Railway
- Area served: Greater Boston
- Key people: Henry Melville Whitney (president, 1887–1893); Samuel Little (president, 1887–1900)
- Revenue: $8,719,031.78 (FY 1897)
- Operating income: $2,505,323.22 (FY 1897)

The West End Street Railway was a streetcar company that operated in Boston, Massachusetts and several surrounding communities in the late nineteenth century.

Originally an offshoot of a land development venture, the West End rose to prominence when it merged several independent streetcar companies into a single organization, and over the next decade it was the primary operator of public street transit within the Boston area. During this time, the company maintained one of the largest street railway systems in the world, the first unified streetcar system in the United States, and first electrified system in a major US city.

The West End remained in independent operation until 1897, when it leased its entire line to the Boston Elevated Railway. It was formally consolidated into the Boston Elevated in 1922.

== History ==
=== Founding ===
West End's original purpose was to provide service to a speculative land venture in western Boston and Brookline. In the mid-1880s, a syndicate of investors led by Henry Melville Whitney chartered West End Land Company, and purchased some five million square feet of land in Brookline along the line of a proposed boulevard, with the intent of developing the tracts into a high-grade residential neighborhood. In conjunction with the development plans, Whitney proposed creating the boulevard as an extension of Beacon Street from Boston, with two wide roadways and a central reservation for a future street railway line. Approval of the boulevard was granted at a Brookline town meeting in March 1887, and construction was commenced that same year.

In order to build and operate the railway line, Whitney and the syndicate chartered West End Street Railway on January 22, 1887. West End also secured other locations in Brookline. Along with a sister organization, Suburban Street Railway, it was soon granted locations in Boston to provide connections with lines of other streetcar companies operating in the city.

=== Consolidation ===
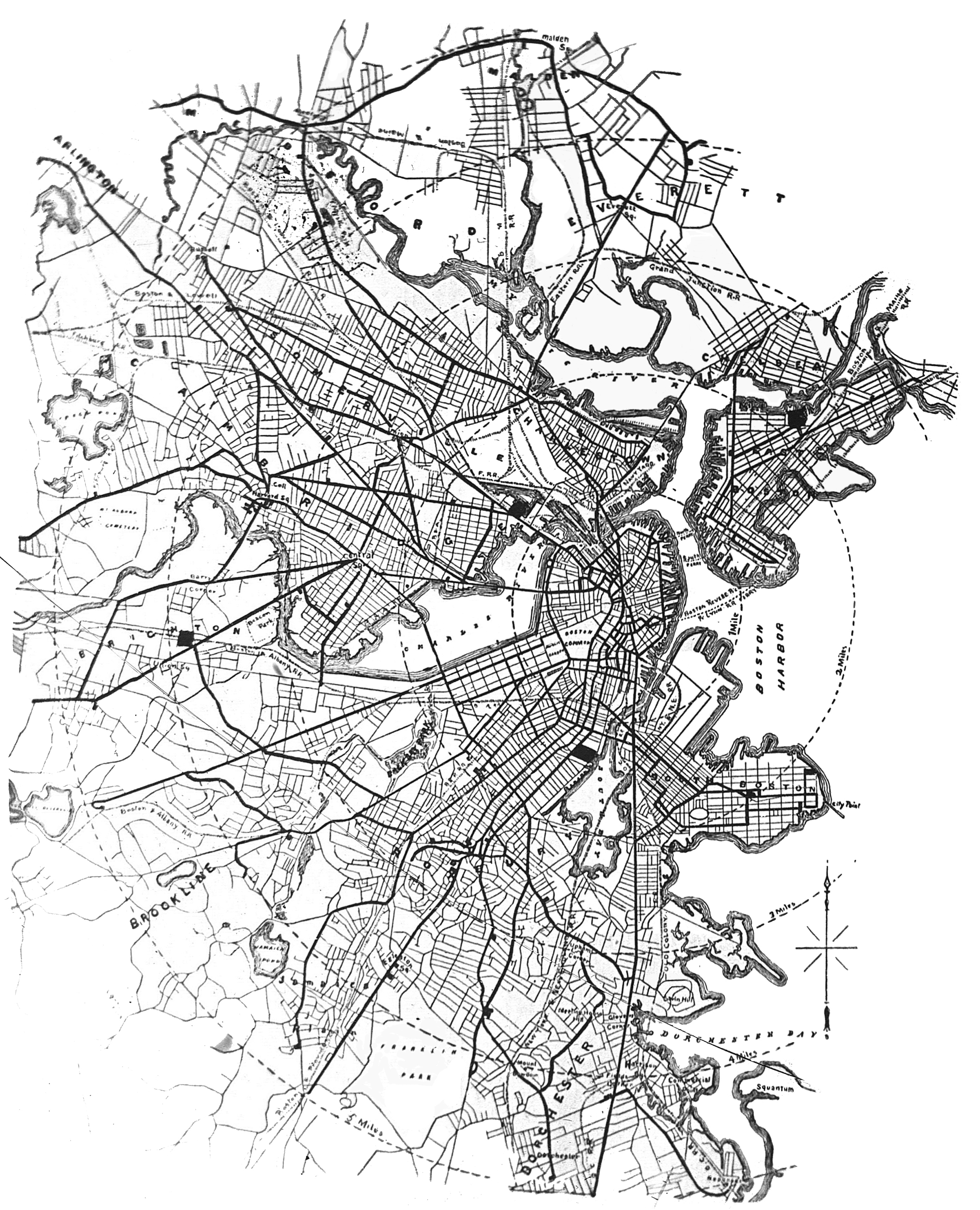
A 1892 map of West End's system (bolded), a few years after consolidation

At the time of West End's formation, horsecar service in the Boston area was divided between several independent railway companies. The four principal ones were: Metropolitan, Cambridge, Consolidated, and South Boston. Each of these principal railways enjoyed a virtual monopoly in a particular area of the metro with the Metropolitan being dominant in lower, western and East Boston, Cambridge in the area of Cambridge, Consolidated in Charlestown and lower Middlesex County, and the South Boston in the South Boston peninsula, from which they transported passengers to a series of several shared terminuses within the central city.

West End originally intended to coordinate operations with principal companies in order to gain access to Downtown Boston; these efforts were however stymied by Metropolitan and Cambridge's directors who feared that the new organization represented a threat to their interests. Whitney and his associates decided to carry out a much more ambitious strategy, in which they acquired a majority of stock in each of the established railways and united them under common ownership. Within a short time, they were able to achieve a controlling interest in all four principal companies. In June 1887, Massachusetts state legislature granted West End a dispensation to unite with any other streetcar company operating in Boston. After some more months of negotiations, consolidation was completed in November 1887, in which shareholders of the four companies turned in their existing shares and in exchange received varying amounts of West End 8% preferred stock.

The consolidation transformed West End into one of the world's largest street railway companies, bringing some two hundred miles of track under its ownership. The move also created the first unified public transit system in a major American city, with nearly all streetcar service in Boston, except that of Lynn and Boston, being operated by the company as a result.;. Over the first ten months following consolidation, West End reported a rider count of 85 million. In its first full year of operations in fiscal year 1888-89, the system carried over 104 million passengers.

Initial public reaction to consolidation to the consolidated company was mixed. Detractors raised concerns that it would set the stage for a monopoly. Proponents, however, argued that it ended the inefficiencies of competing railways, which were blamed for high levels of congestion and blockades on Boston's streets, and improving service as a result. In remarks to stockholders shortly after the merger, Whitney defended consolidation, saying, "the blockades occurring on the principal thoroughfares" in Boston had reached the point of requiring a remedy, and that "if [the West End] had not taken hold of this matter the city would surely have done something [instead]."

=== Electrification ===
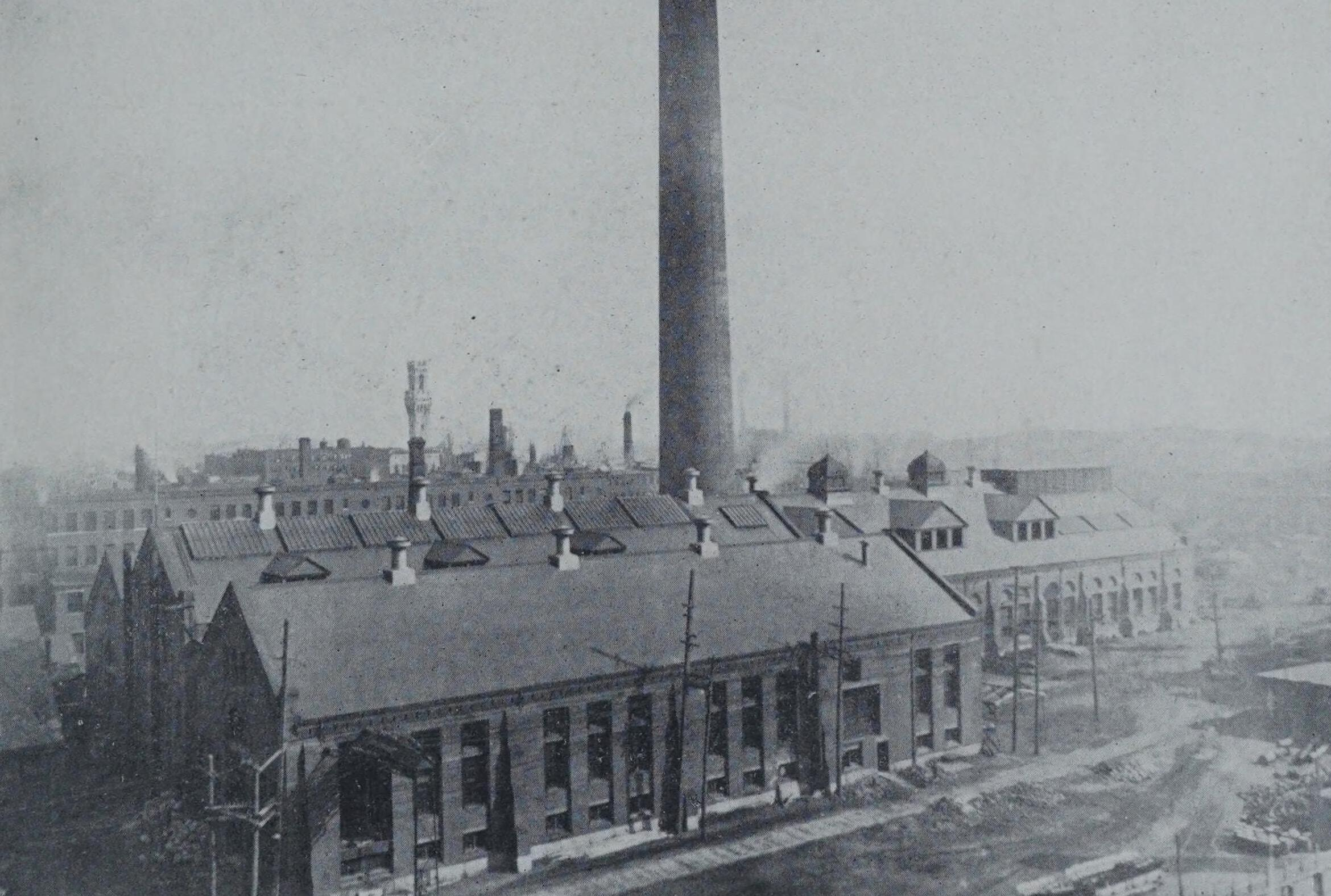
A central power station in the South End for the electric lines, built between 1889 and 1891

Following consolidation, West End began exploring electrifying its system in order to improve performance and cut operating costs. To assess this, Whitney and general manager Daniel Longstreet made exploratory visits to several cities, including Richmond, Virginia, where Frank Sprague had developed the first practical electric trolley line in the country. The success of the Richmond system convinced Whitney and Longstreet that electrification would prove beneficial. West End soon contracted with Sprague to build an experimental line in Boston.

At first, the company experimented with both overhead lines and ground-level conduits for power, but the ground-level conduits were found to be impractical and were quickly abandoned. After conducting test runs in late 1888, a line running between Boston and Brookline was opened on January 1, 1889, and a second line to Cambridge commenced operating on February 16. Within a few months, the company initiated a contract with Thomson-Houston Electric Company to equip the entire West End system.

In 1891, the conversion inspired Oliver Wendell Holmes Sr.'s poem "The Broomstick Train, or The Return of the Witches", in which Holmes imagined streetcars being propelled by Salem witches with their broomsticks as trolley poles.

Horsecars stopped at any point upon passenger request, which became impractical with increased service; as lines were electrified, West End designated stopping points with white-painted bands on poles.

By the end of 1892, electric trolleys accounted for two-thirds of total car mileage. By 1894, they constituted over 90 percent of total mileage.; By the end of 1895, just five horsecar routes remained. By the time the final pair on Marlborough Street in Back Bay were discontinued on December 24, 1900, the only horsecar still operating in Massachusetts was a short line in Onset.

=== Elevated railway and subway proposals ===
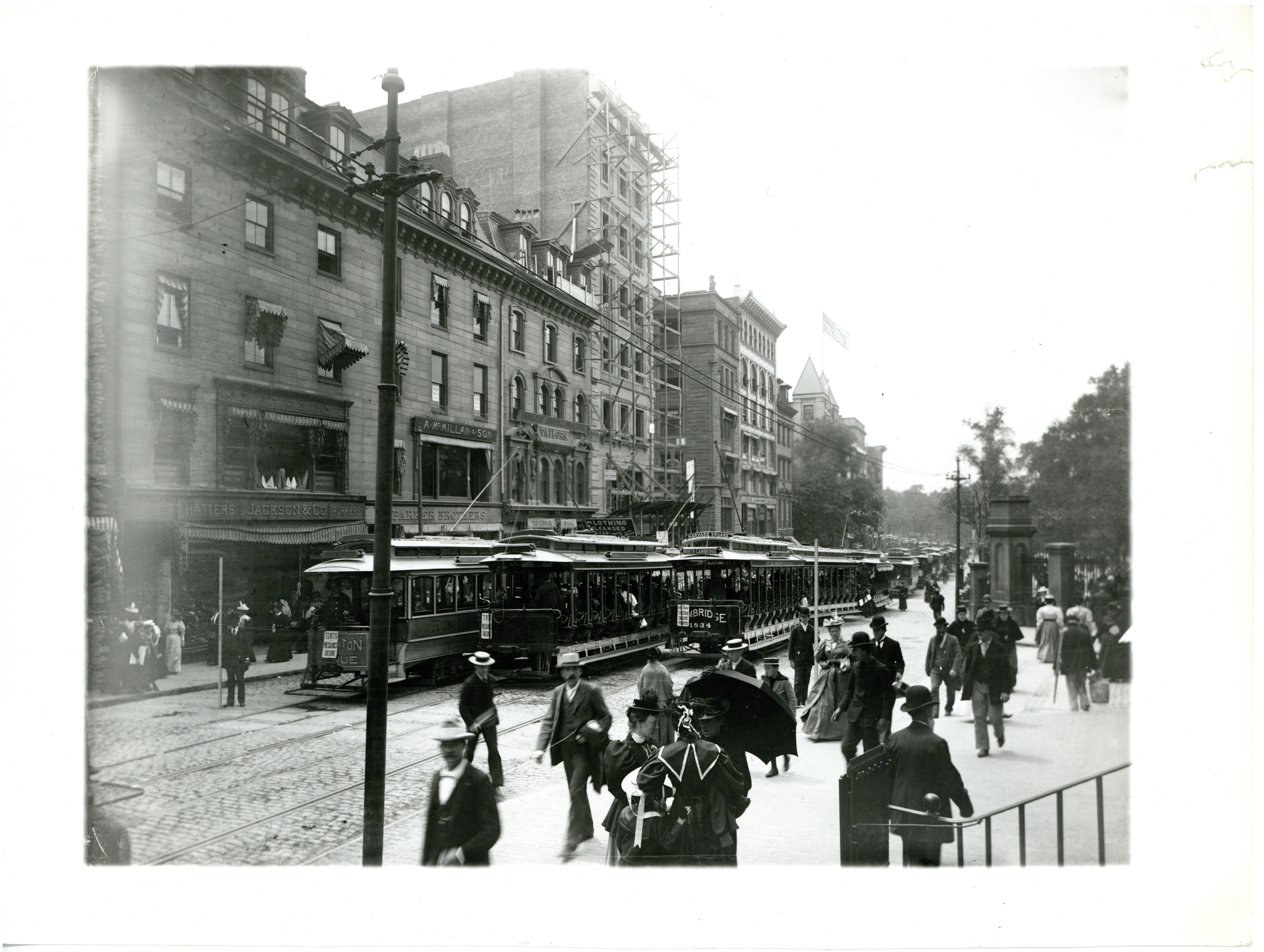
A long procession of West End streetcars near the corner of Tremont and Park streets, c. 1895

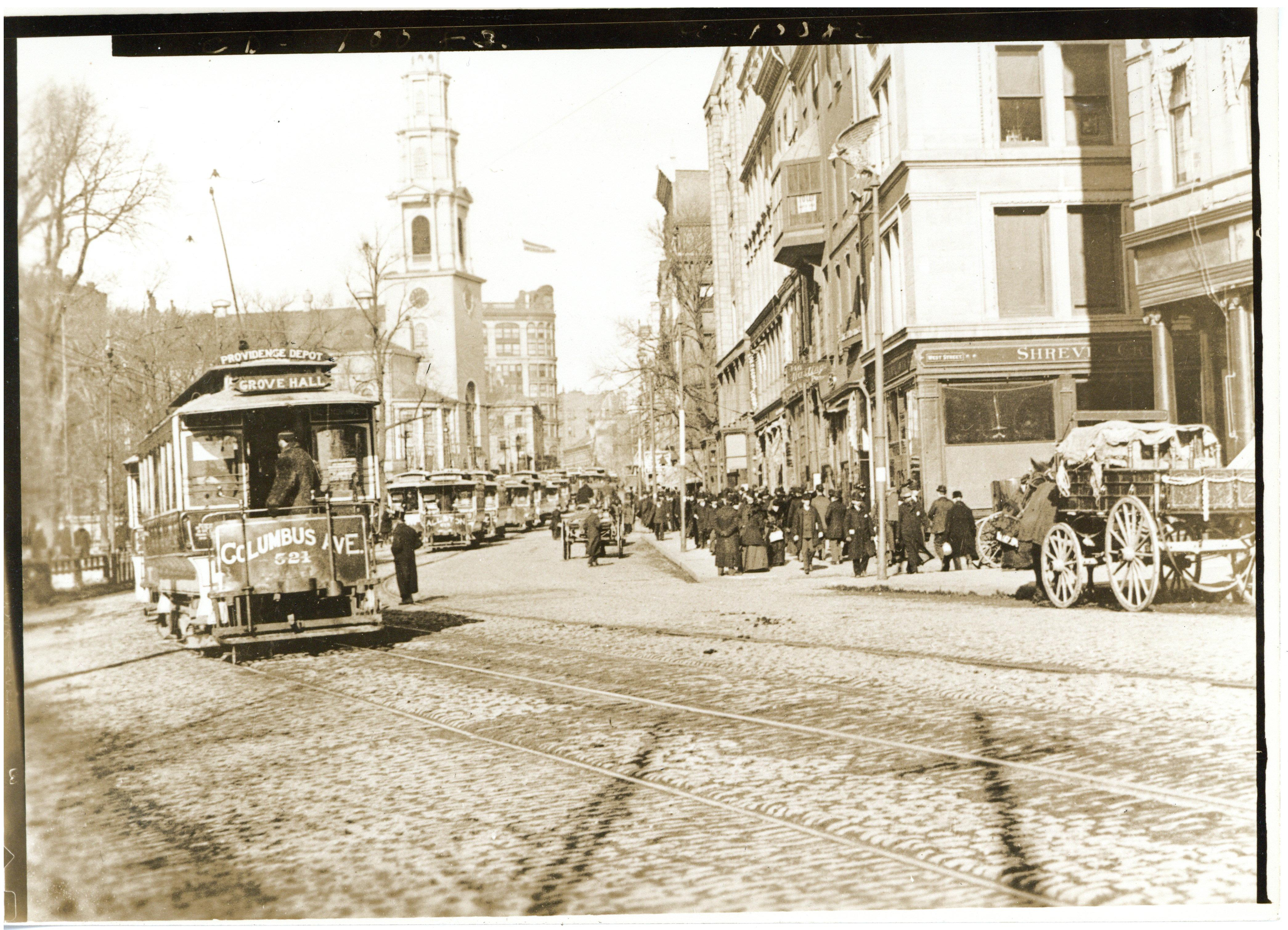
A West End streetcar on Tremont Street, c. 1895

One of the largest challenges facing West End during its history was dealing with massive increases in passenger usage, which led to ever-increasing levels of congestion on Boston streets during the 1880s and 1890s. At first, West End's management was slow to address this challenge. But in order to head off potential competition from rival companies, they eventually offered several proposals for establishing rapid transit lines to relieve Boston traffic.

West End initially attempted to build an elevated railway to provide rapid transit into central Boston. In July 1890, the state legislature passed a measure authorizing West End to construct elevated railroads. Three months later, Whitney unveiled a plan for a main line running between Roxbury and Charlestown. In December, however, preliminary work on the line was halted after facing opposition from various parties. The project then eventually stalled out. Other proposals for West End, including a controversial idea for a rail running through Boston Common, were similarly never carried out. The company ultimately did not put in place any elevated or dedicated lines.

Another idea for reducing congestion, a subway or tunnel line, was considered by West End in 1887. Over the next few years, however, it was unable to develop a serious workable proposal on this front. By the mid-1890s, it was decided that the issue was best left to the state and local authorities to resolve. Boston Transit Commission was designated to build a subway for trolley cars running underneath Tremont Street in central Boston.

In December 1896, West End signed an agreement with the Transit Commission to lease the tunnel, known as the Tremont Street Subway, which is now the central part of the Green Line, for a period of 20 years following its completion. Under the lease's terms, the company was to pay 4.875% per year on the lesser of $7 million, or the actual cost of the tunnel, with additional compensation owed based on volume of use.

In September 1893, Whitney stepped down as president and was replaced by Samuel Little, a former organizer and treasurer of Highland Street Railway.

=== Lease to the Boston Elevated ===
In 1894, Boston Elevated Railway was incorporated with a charter to develop a system of rapid transit routes in Greater Boston. Among the group of investors in the new company was Josiah V. Meigs, inventor of an experimental steam-powered monorail known as the Meigs Elevated Railway. The charter enabled West End to construct an elevated railway based either on the Meigs plan or an alternate approved design, but excluded any designs based on the existing Manhattan system in use in New York City.

Within a year of Boston Elevated's incorporation, the group behind it realized that they were unable to raise sufficient capital to develop their proposed railway, and they attempted to sell their charter to a variety of parties, including West End. The company's directors, however, considered the charter incompatible with their interests, in part due to perceived impracticality of the Meigs system and the prohibition on emulating the Manhattan design. West End's board turned down an offer to acquire Boston Elevated for $150,000, preferring instead to focus on existing operations and prepare for the subway's upcoming opening.

Rejection of the purchase provoked disagreement among West End shareholders of the West End. A faction of investors favored the elevated railway system and decided to take action against the board's decision. The group, which included Eben Dyer Jordan and William Bancroft, backed financially by Kidder, Peabody & Co. and J.P. Morgan, quickly acquired a controlling interest in Boston Elevated and attempted to do the same with West End. Following a highly publicized proxy fight, the Kidder-Morgan faction managed to gain control of the board at the annual shareholders' meeting in November 1896. Shortly after, plans were formed to lease West End's system to Boston Elevated on a long-term basis.

In June 1897, the state legislature authorized West End's lines and property to be leased to and operated by Boston Elevated. The lease was initially for a 99-year term, under which West End common stock shareholders would receive a fixed annual dividend of 8%. In November 1897, after this proposal was rejected by Massachusetts Board of Railroad Commissioners, the lease's term was shortened to 25 years and the dividend rate was reduced to 7%. The modified lease was approved by West End shareholders on December 9, 1897, and it was ratified by the board of railroad commissioners on December 18.

=== 20th century ===
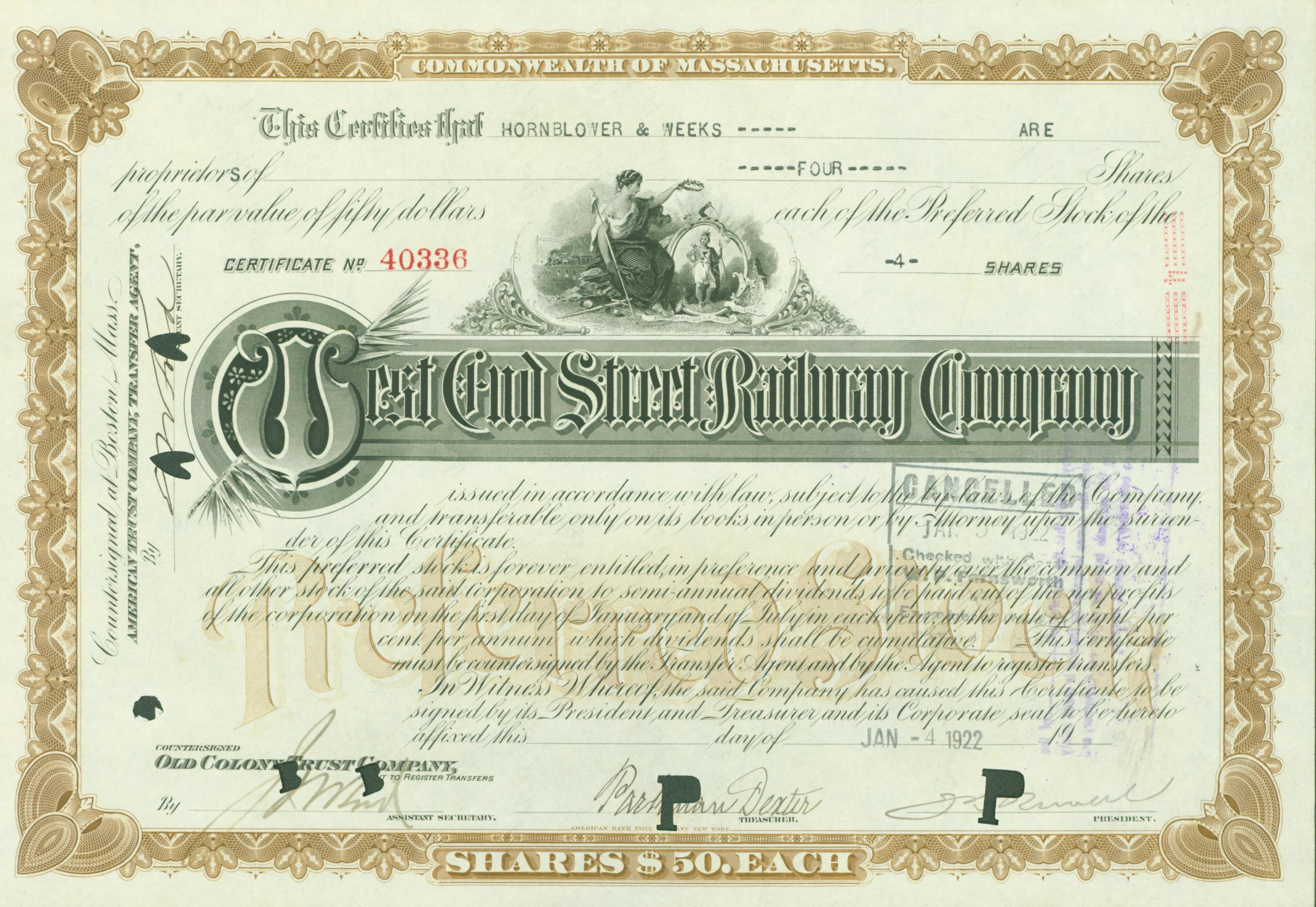
A share of West End Street Railway Company, issued on January 4, 1922

Following the turn of the century, in 1900, Samuel Little resigned as president and was succeeded by Joseph B. Russell. In 1911, the state legislature authorized the purchase and merger of West End by Boston Elevated following the lease's expiration. Following the merger, holders of West End's preferred and common stock exchanged their shares at par for an equal amount of stock in Boston Elevated.

On June 10, 1922, West End was consolidated into Boston Elevated.

== Summary statistics ==
	Revenue miles run				Revenue passengers		
FY;.	Electric cars	Horse cars	Total	Track miles operated	Passengers carried	Passenger Receipts	Receipts/ passenger
1888	-	-	13,495,511	231.160	84,843,072	$4,213,954	4.967¢
1889	525,366	16,048,465	16,573,831	253.20-	104,243,150	$5,171,975	4.961¢
1890	3,311,743	14,353,617	17,665,360	256.787	114,853,081	$5,678,390	4.944¢
1891	4,588,146	12,874,426	17,462,572	259.817	119,264,401	$5,889,180	4.938¢
1892	8,510,283	8,988,377	17,498,660	263.416	126,210,781	$6,237,646	4.942¢
1893	14,220,847	4,448,962	18,669,809	268.338	133,863,618	$6,616,607	4.943¢
1894	16,794,961	2,445,525	19,240,486	272.894	137,028,449	$6,734,311	4.914¢
1895	21,101,457	1,078,668	22,180,125	274.826	155,231,506	$7,624,277	4.912¢
1896	25,300,918	540,989	25,841,907	295.561	166,862,288	$8,198,914	4.914¢
1897	29,450,978	335,958	29,786,936	304.462	172,554,513	$8,536,286	4.947¢

The above excludes passenger numbers from free transfer passengers, as well as miles run by/revenue from U.S. Mail cars.

Equipment (FY 1897)
	Passenger Cars				
	Horse	Electric	Other Cars	Motors	Snow/ Misc.
Box Cars, Horse	212	-	-	-	-
Open Cars, Horse	76	-	-	-	-
Box Cars, Electric, 16-foot bodies	-	70	-	-	-
Box Cars, Electric, 20-foot bodies	-	335	-	-	-
Box Cars, Electric, 25-foot bodies	-	761	-	-	-
Open Cars, Electric, 7 or 8 benches	-	580	-	-	-
Open Cars, Electric, 9 benches	-	567	-	-	-
Open Cars, Electric, 10 benches	-	47	-	-	-
Mail Cars, Electric	-	-	11	-	-
Motor Cars, Electric	-	-	2	-	-
Horses	-	-	-	487	-
Electric Motors	-	-	-	3,121	-
Snow Plows, Horse	-	-	-	-	78
Snow Plows, Electric	-	-	-	-	150
Snow Sleds	-	-	-	-	393
Miscellaneous Vehicles	-	-	-	-	482
Total	288	2,360	13	3,608	1,103
