= Cambridge Railroad =

Map of the lines of the Cambridge (in red) and other horsecar companies operating in Boston in 1886

The Cambridge Railroad (also known as the Cambridge Horse Railroad) was the first street railway in the Boston, Massachusetts area, linking Harvard Square in Cambridge to Cambridge and Grove Streets in Boston's West End, via Massachusetts Avenue, Main Street and the West Boston Bridge.

== History ==
=== 19th century ===
The company was chartered and incorporated May 25, 1853, and started construction September 1, 1855. The horsecar line opened between West Cedar Street (just east of Charles Street) and Central Square on March 26, 1856. Extensions opened in April to Brattle House in Brattle Square and to Revere House in Bowdoin Square.

A further extension to Mount Auburn Cemetery and a branch to Porter Square soon opened. The connecting Watertown Horse Railroad opened on April 27, 1857. The Porter Square branch was extended to the border of West Cambridge (now Arlington); there it met the West Cambridge Horse Railroad, which opened on June 13, 1859.

The line beat a rival company by buying secondhand cars from the Brooklyn City Railroad. Over the first two months, no fares were charged, making the line very popular, with over 2000 passengers per day within a week. When it started to charge fares, the public was outraged, many calling for the franchises to be revoked.

From its incorporation, the Cambridge Railroad was leased to the Union Railway for 50 years, later passing under control of the West End Street Railway in 1887 and the Boston Elevated Railway in 1897. The main line from Harvard square to Boston was electrified February 16, 1889, with most of the other former Cambridge Railroad lines following by the early 1890s.

=== 20th century ===
The mostly-underground Red Line subway opened March 23, 1912 and provided a much faster route from Harvard Square to Downtown Boston, but streetcars remained in service for local traffic. Streetcar service from Cambridge to Boston (using part of the original Cambridge Railroad route on Massachusetts Avenue) last ran September 11, 1949, and the former Cambridge Railroad streetcar route from Harvard University north to Porter Square remained in use until September 5, 1958.

== See also ==
- Dorchester Railroad, opened spring 1857
