= Boston and Northern Street Railway =

Former transportation company in Greater Boston, Massachusetts

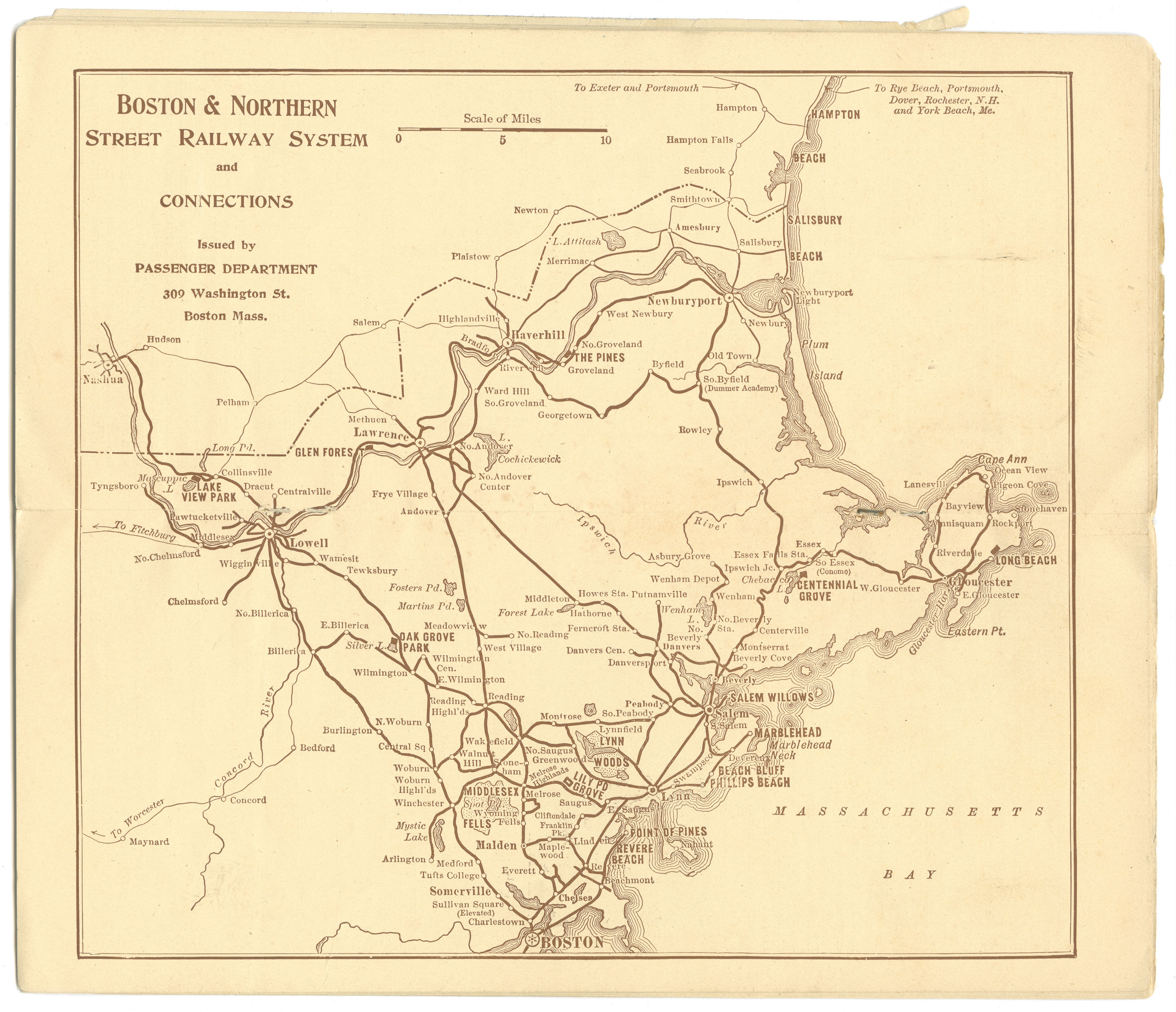
1906 Boston and Northern Street Railway map

The Boston & Northern Street Railway Company (B&N) was a horse-drawn and electric streetcar railroad operated on the streets of Boston, Massachusetts, and communities to the north. Founded in 1859 as the Lynn and Boston Railroad (L&B), via lease and merger it became a primary mass transit provider for northeastern Massachusetts and New Hampshire. Its immediate successor was the Bay State Street Railway (Bay State), and its modern successor is the state-run Massachusetts Bay Transportation Authority (MBTA).

== Formation ==
The Boston & Northern was renamed from the Lynn & Boston on July 23, 1901, following the latter's purchase and merger of the following companies, each having previously acquired the below-listed smaller street railways. Additional street railway companies were subsequently acquired.

All of the following street railway companies eventually became part of the Bay State, which was later absorbed by the Eastern Massachusetts Street Railway (Eastern Mass) in 1919. Eastern Mass was acquired by the Massachusetts Bay Transportation Authority (MBTA) in 1968.

== Constituent companies ==
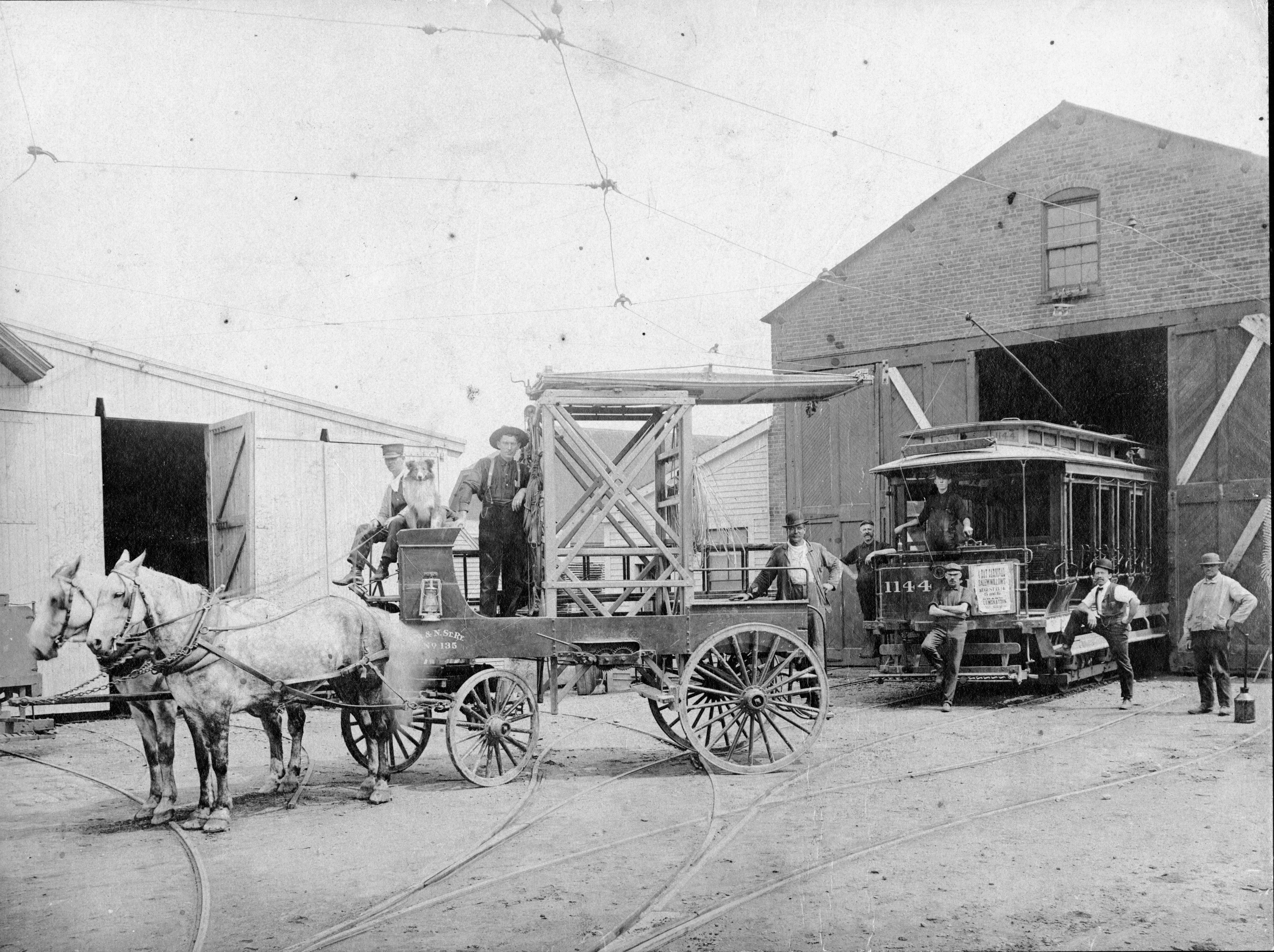
Boston and Northern Street Railway carbarn in Salem, 1905

=== Lynn & Boston Railroad Company ===
The L&B was formed on April 6, 1859 and later merged in 1901 into the B&N.

- Beverly & Danvers Street Railway
  incorporated 1896, merged 1901 into the L&B.
- Boston & Chelsea Railroad
  incorporated 1854, leased 1880 to L&B.
- Boston & Revere Electric Street Railway
  incorporated 1889, leased 1895 to the L&B.
- East Middlesex Street Railway
  incorporated 1887, leased 1893 to the L&B.
- Essex Electric Street Railway
  sold 1894 to the L&B.
- Gloucester Street Railway
  incorporated 1886, sold 1900 to the L&B.
  - Gloucester Essex & Beverly Street Railway
    incorporated 1893, sold 1900 to Gloucester Street Railway.
  - Gloucester & Rockport Street Railway
    incorporated in 1894, leased in 1895 to Gloucester Street Railway, merged 1901 into L&B.
  - Rockport Street Railway
    incorporated 1896, sold 1900 to Gloucester Street Railway.
- Lynn Belt Line Street Railway
  incorporated 1889, sold 1894 to L&B.
- Naumkeag Street Railway
  incorporated 1875, sold 1894 to L&B.
  - Salem Street Railway
    incorporated 1861 as the Salem and South Danvers Railroad Co., consolidated into Naumkeag Street Railway in 1886.
  - Salem & Danvers Street Railway
    incorporated 1884, leased 1887 to Naumkeag Street Railway.
- North Woburn Street Railway Company
  incorporated 1866, merged 1901 into B&N.
- Wakefield & Stoneham Street Railway
  incorporated 1892, sold 1900 to L&B.
  - Mystic Valley Street Railway Co.
    incorporated 1896, sold 1899 to Wakefield & Stoneham Street Railway.
    - Arlington & Winchester Street Railway
      incorporated 1897, sold 1898 to Mystic Valley Street Railway Co.
  - Reading & Lowell Street Railway
    incorporated 1895, sold 1899 to Wakefield & Stoneham Street Railway.
  - Salem & Wakefield Street Railway
    incorporated 1897, sold 1899 to Wakefield & Stoneham Street Railway.
  - Woburn & Reading Street Railway
    incorporated 1896, sold 1899 to Wakefield & Stoneham Street Railway.
- Winnisimmet Street Railway
  incorporated 1857, leased to L&B.

=== Lowell, Lawrence & Haverhill Street Railway Company ===
The Lowell, Lawrence & Haverhill Street Railway Company (LL&H) was incorporated 1892, later merged in 1901 into the B&N.

- Haverhill & Groveland Street Railway
  incorporated 1877, merged 1893 into LL&H.
- Merrimack Valley Street Railway
  merged 1893 into LL&H.
- Lowell & Suburban Street Railway
  incorporated 1859, sold 1900 to LL&H.
  - Lowell Horse Railroad Company
    incorporated 1863, merged 1891 into Lowell & Suburban Street Railway.
    - Lowell & Dracut Street Railway
      purchased in 1890 by Lowell Horse Railroad Company.
- Peoples Street Railway
  incorporated 1897, sold 1898 to LL&H.

=== Subsequently acquired companies ===
- Georgetown Rowley & Ipswich Street Railway - incorporated 1899, sold 1906 to B&N.
- Haverhill Georgetown & Danvers Street Railway - incorporated 1893, sold 1906 to B&N.
- Lawrence & Reading Street Railway - incorporated 1900, sold 1903 to B&N.
  - Reading Wakefield & Lynnfield Street Railway - incorporated 1902, sold 1903 to Lawrence & Reading Street Railway.
- Lowell & Woburn Street Railway Co. - incorporated 1905, sold 1906 to B&N.
- Middleton & Danvers Street Railway - incorporated 1901, sold 1903 to B&N.

== Communities served ==
The following cities and towns in Massachusetts and New Hampshire were served by the B&N:

- Andover
- Arlington
- Beverly
- Billerica
- Boston
- Chelmsford
- Chelsea
- Danvers
- Dracut
- Essex
- Everett
- Gloucester
- Groveland
- Hamilton
- Haverhill
- Hudson
- Ipswich
- Lawrence
- Lowell
- Lynn
- Lynnfield
- Malden
- Marblehead
- Medford
- Melrose
- Methuen
- Nashua
- Newburyport
- North Andover
- Peabody
- Reading
- Revere
- Rockport
- Salem
- Saugus
- Stoneham
- Swampscott
- Tewksbury
- Tyngsborough
- Wakefield
- Wenham
- West Newbury
- Wilmington
- Winchester
- Woburn
