= Old Colony Street Railway =

Former transportation company in Greater Boston, Massachusetts

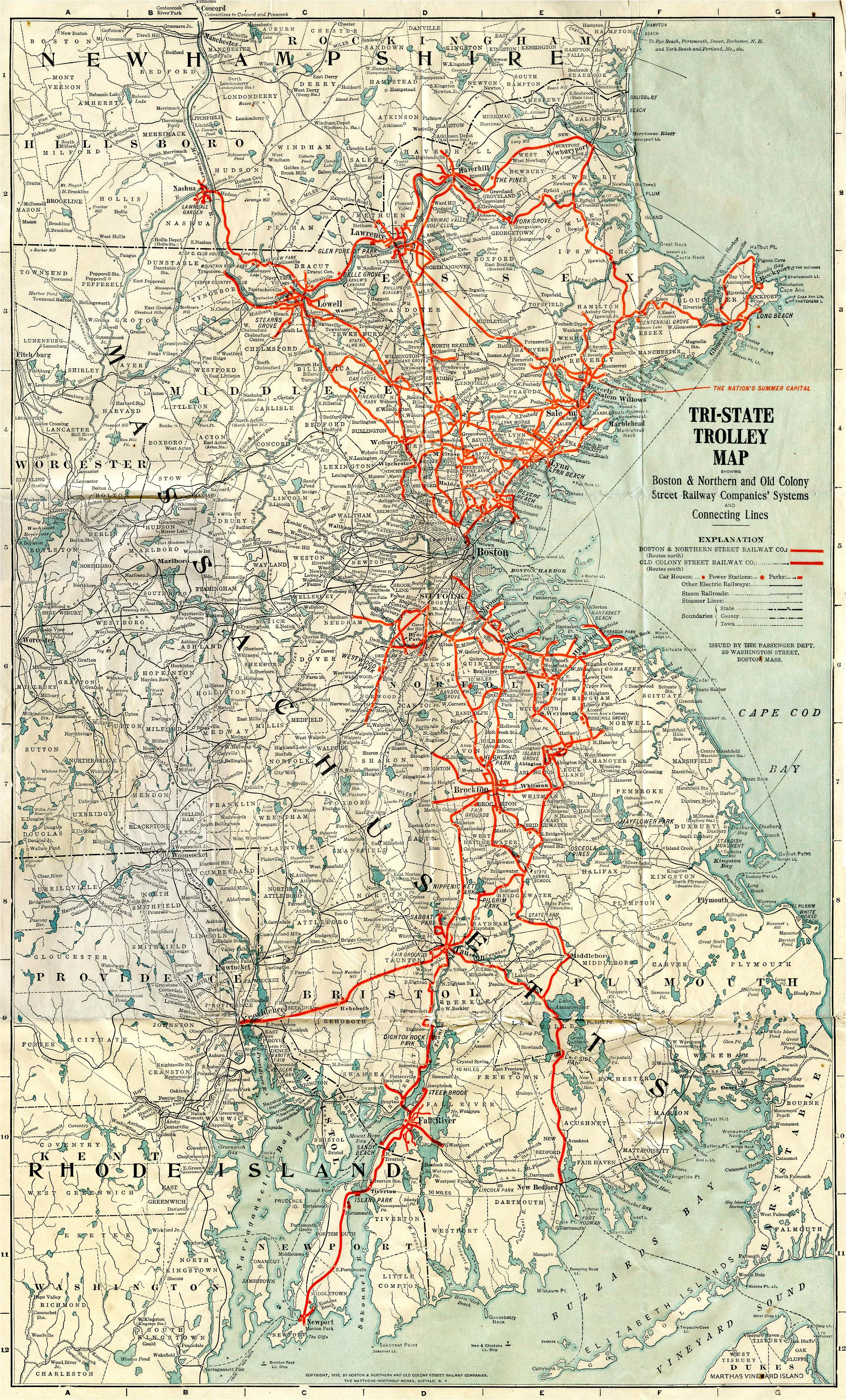
1910 Tri-state Trolley Map

The Old Colony Street Railway Company (Old Colony St. Ry.) was a horse-drawn and electric streetcar railroad operated on the streets of Boston, Massachusetts and communities south of the city. Founded in 1881 as the Brockton Street Railway Company, via lease and merger it became a primary mass transit provider for southeastern Massachusetts and Rhode Island. Its immediate successor was the Bay State Street Railway, and its modern successor is the state-run Massachusetts Bay Transportation Authority (MBTA).

== Founding ==
The Old Colony Street Railway Company began operations on July 5, 1881, as the Brockton Street Railway Company (Brockton St. Ry.) The corporate name of the company was changed to Old Colony on February 7, 1901. All of the below listed street railway companies eventually became part of the Bay State Street Railway (Bay State), later absorbed by the Eastern Massachusetts Street Railway (Eastern Mass), in 1919. Eastern Mass was acquired by the Massachusetts Bay Transportation Authority (MBTA) in 1968.

== Mergers and acquisitions ==
The following companies were purchased and merged with the Brockton Street Railway Company:

1. Boston, Milton & Brockton Street Railway Company
  Corporate office: Quincy
  began operations on July 11, 1899, sold February 10, 1900 to Brockton St. Ry. and consolidated
2. Brockton, Bridgewater & Taunton Street Railway Company
  Corporate office: Bridgewater
  commenced operations June 14, 1897, sold on February 10, 1900, to Brockton St. Ry. and consolidated
3. Brockton & East Bridgewater Street Railway Company
  Corporate office: Bridgewater
  commenced operations July 3, 1897, sold February 10, 1900 to Brockton St. Ry. and consolidated
4. Brockton & Holbrook Street Railway Company
  Corporate office: Brockton
  commenced operations on September 19, 1892; leased to Brockton St. Ry. Co. on April 1, 1893; purchased by Brockton St. Ry. Co. on September 17, 1894
5. Brockton & Stoughton Street Railway Company
  Corporate office: Boston
  Incorporated 1894, sold June 11, 1895 to Brockton St. Ry. Co. prior to starting operations.
6. East Side Street Railway Company
  Corporate office: Brockton
  commenced operations on November 1, 1888; leased to Brockton St. Ry. Co. on October 1, 1892; purchased by Brockton St. Ry. Co. on September 17, 1894
7. Globe Street Railway Company (Globe St. Ry.)
  Corporate office: Fall River
  incorporated April 16, 1880; merged on January 19, 1901, with the Brockton St. Ry.
  - Fall River Street Railway Company
    Corporate office: Fall River
    incorporated 1895; begun operations May 28, 1896; sold April 30, 1898 to Globe St. Ry. and consolidated
  - Dighton, Somerset & Swansea Street Railway Company
    Corporate office: Taunton
    incorporated 1895; started operating July 8, 1895; sold and consolidated with Globe St. Ry. April 24, 1900
  - Taunton Street Railway Company
    incorporated 1871, sold 1901 to Globe St. Ry.
    - Providence & Taunton Street Railway Company
      incorporated 1898, sold in 1900 to Taunton Street Railway
8. New Bedford, Middleborough & Brockton Street Railway Company
  sold in 1900 to Brockton St. Ry. and consolidated
9. Quincy & Boston Street Railway Company
  incorporated 1889, sold in 1900 to Brockton St. Ry. and consolidated
  - Quincy Street Railway
    incorporated 1888, leased 1889 to Quincy & Boston Street Railway, sold 1895 to Quincy & Boston Street Railway
  - Braintree Street Railway
    incorporated 1893, leased 1895 to Quincy & Boston Street Railway, sold 1899 to Quincy & Boston Street Railway
    - Randolph Street Railway
      sold 1897 to Braintree Street Railway.
10. South Shore & Boston Street Railway Company
  Corporate office: Quincy
  incorporated in 1894 as the Hanover Street Railway Company (headquartered in Rockland); named changed July 15, 1899; sold on November 21, 1900, to Brockton St. Ry. and consolidated
  - Braintree & Weymouth Street Railway Company
    incorporated 1891, merged July 15, 1899 with Hanover St. Ry.
  - Bridgewater Whitman & Rockland Street Railway Company
    Incorporated 1897, merged July 15, 1899 with Hanover St. Ry.
  - Hingham Street Railway Company
    incorporated 1895, merged July 15, 1899 with Hanover
    - Hull Street Railway Company
      incorporated 1887, sold 1898 to Hingham Street Railway.
    - Nantasket Electric Street Railway Company
      sold 1898 to Hingham Street Railway.
  - Rockland & Abington Street Railway Company
    incorporated 1892, merged July 15, 1899 with Hanover
11. Taunton & Brockton Street Railway Company
  Corporate office: Brockton
  incorporated in 1896; sold on February 10, 1900, to Brockton St. Ry. and consolidated
12. West Roxbury & Roslindale Street Railway Company (WR&R)
  was incorporated in 1896, and merged on December 22, 1900, with Brockton St. Ry.
  - Needham & Boston Street Railway Company
    sold 1900 to WR&R.
  - Norfolk Central Street Railway Company
    Corporate office: Dedham)
    incorporated 1896, sold 1899 to WR&R and consolidated. (Opened Westwood Park)
  - Norfolk Suburban Street Railway Company
    Corporate office: Dedham
    incorporated 1893- sold 1900 to WR&R.
    - Norfolk Street Railway Company
      incorporated 1889, sold 1892 to Norfolk Suburban.
13. Whitman Street Railway Company
  leased to Brockton St. Ry. Co. on April 1, 1892; purchased by Brockton St. Ry. Co. on September 17, 1894

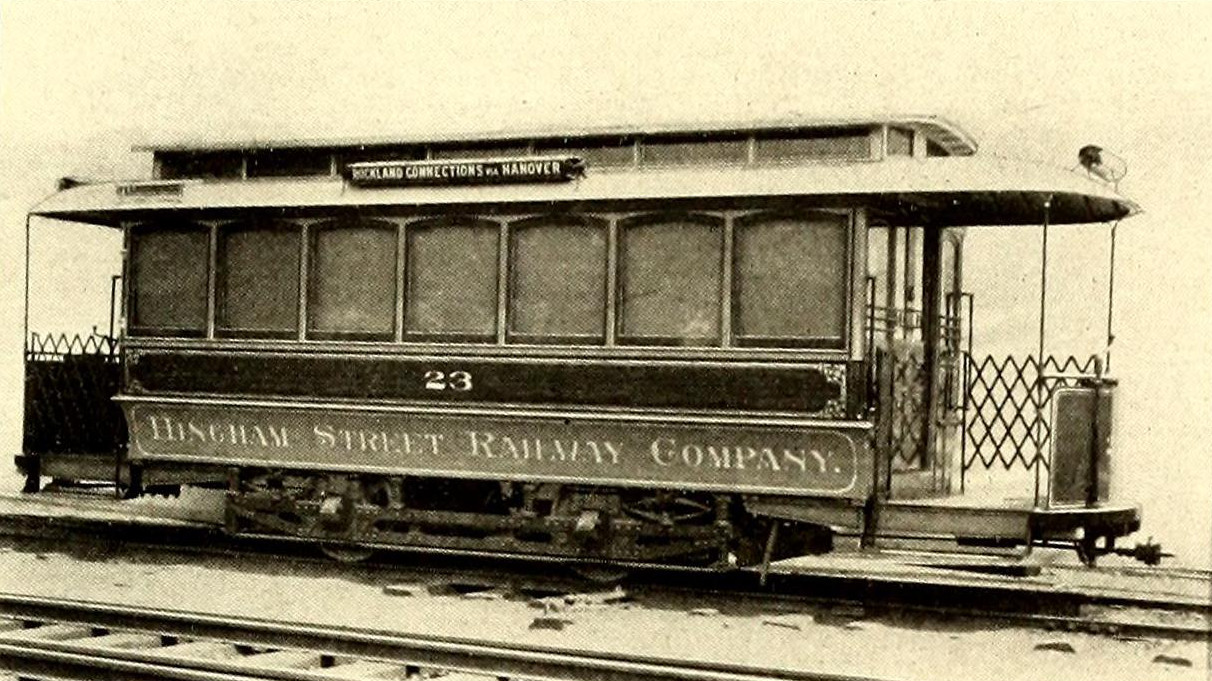
Hingham Street Railway car, 1898

=== Additional acquisitions by Old Colony ===
The Old Colony St. Ry. also later acquired the following street railway companies:

- Newport & Fall River Street Railway Company
  incorporated 1898, leased 1901 to OC.
- Taunton & Pawtucket Street Railway Company
  incorporated 1904, sold to OC.
  - Bristol County Street Railway Company
    incorporated 1899, sold 1904 to Taunton & Pawtucket Street Railway.

== Purchase and consolidation ==
The Old Colony St. Ry. was purchased by and consolidated with the Boston and Northern Street Railway on July 1, 1911. The B&N was renamed the Bay State on August 8, 1911, and the Bay State was acquired by Eastern Massachusetts Street Railway Company on January 15, 1919. . Eastern Mass was purchased by the MBTA in 1968.

== Communities served ==
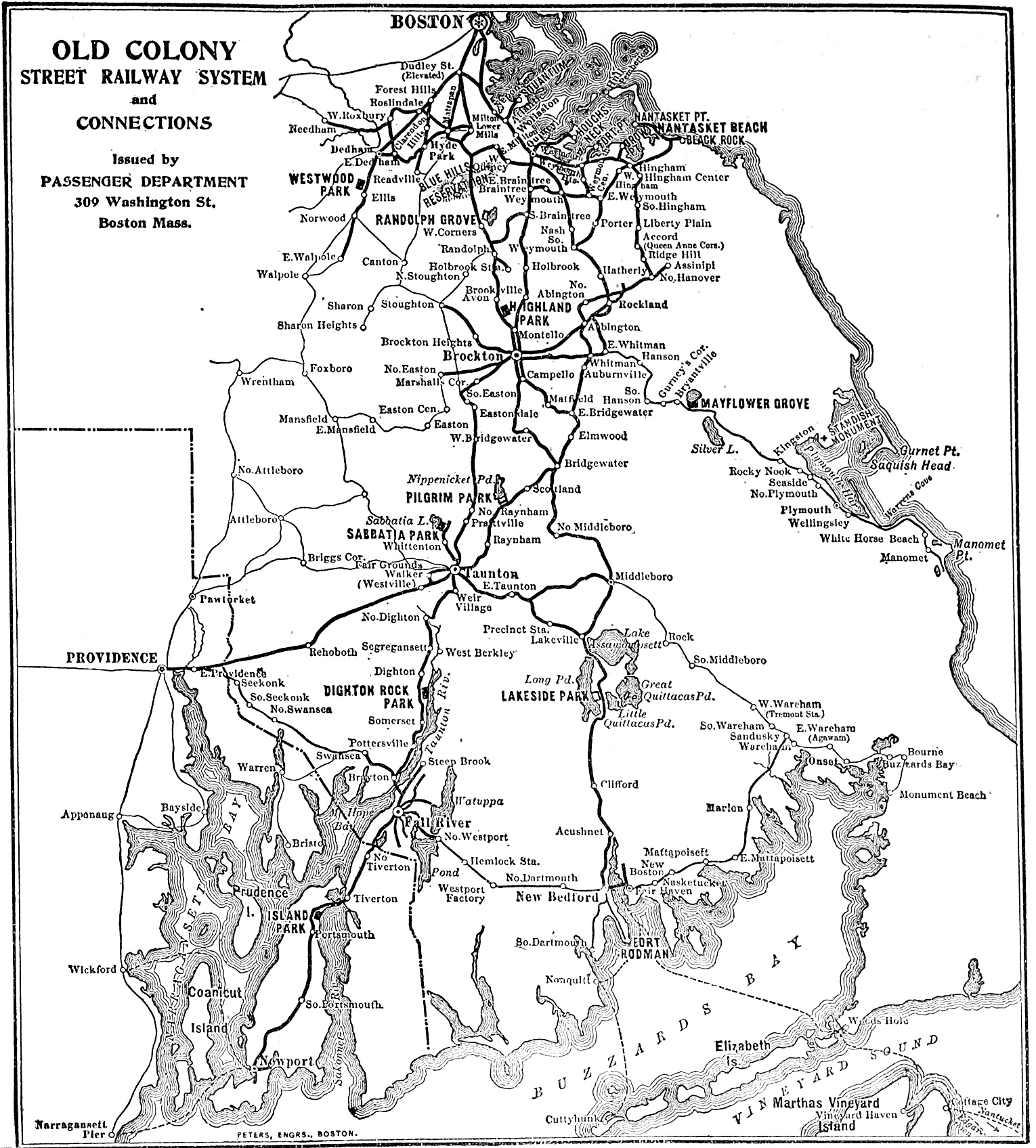
1908 map

The following cities and towns in Massachusetts and Rhode Island were serviced by the Old Colony:

- Abington
- Avon
- Braintree
- Bridgewater
- Brockton
- Boston
- Dedham
- Dighton
- Easton
- East Bridgewater
- Fall River
- Freetown
- Hanover
- Hingham
- Holbrook
- Hull
- Hyde Park
- Lakeville
- Milton
- Middleboro
- Middleton
- Needham
- New Bedford
- Newport
- Norwell
- Norwood
- Portsmouth
- Quincy
- Randolph
- Rehoboth
- Raynham
- Rockland
- Seekonk
- Somerset
- Stoughton
- Taunton
- Tiverton
- Taunton
- Westwood
- West Bridgewater
- Weymouth
- Whitman
