= Conductor's Building =

Former Boston railway administration building

- The Conductor's Building in 2026
- Interactive map of the Conductor's Building area

General information
- Location: 112 Mount Auburn Street (2 Bennett Street), Cambridge, Massachusetts
- Coordinates: 42.372771°N 71.122286°W
- Completed: 1912
- Client: Boston Elevated Railway
- Owner: Carpenter & Co.

Dimensions
- Other dimensions: 144 feet (44 m) long by 20 feet (6.1 m) wide

Technical details
- Material: Brick

The Conductor's Building is a former Boston Elevated Railway (BERy) administrative building, located on Bennett Alley between Mount Auburn Street and Bennett Street near Harvard Square in Cambridge, Massachusetts. Built in 1912 as the headquarters of BERy's 7th Division, it is the only original building surviving from the construction of the Cambridge subway. After being renovated from 2014 to 2017 as part of an adjacent hotel project, the building was used as a restaurant from April 2017 to August 2018. An American Chinese restaurant and tiki bar, Wusong Road, opened in the building in December 2021. Under the name Boston Elevated R.Y. Offices, it is a contributing property to the Harvard Square Historic District.

== History ==
=== Construction ===
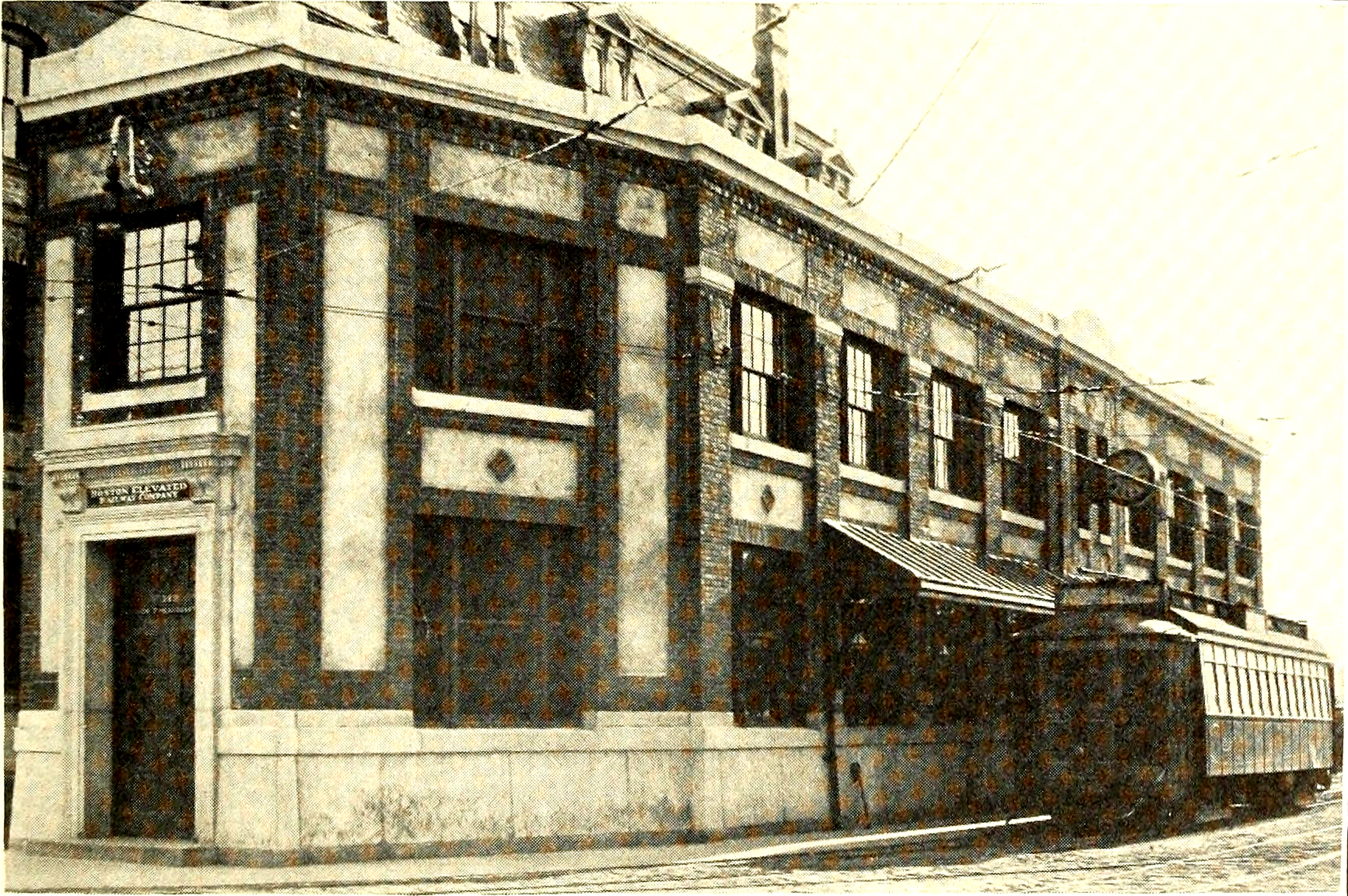
Division 7 Headquarters shortly after completion

From 1909 to 1912, the Boston Elevated Railway (BERy) constructed its Cambridge subway from Park Street Under to Harvard Square. Harvard Square station included a streetcar tunnel from Mount Auburn Street to Cambridge Street; many busy streetcar lines from the north and west were redirected away from the crowded square and into the new tunnel. Bennett Street Carhouse was constructed to serve these lines; tracks through a private alley later known as Bennett Alley connected the carhouse to the south end of the streetcar tunnel.

The BERy constructed a narrow two-story brick building – 144 feet (44 m) long by just 20 feet (6.1 m) wide – to serve as the headquarters of its 7th Division. The first floor was occupied by offices and a sizable lobby for conductors and motormen; the basement with storage areas, locker rooms, and bathrooms; and the second floor with more offices, an assembly hall, and a small public waiting room.

=== Decline ===
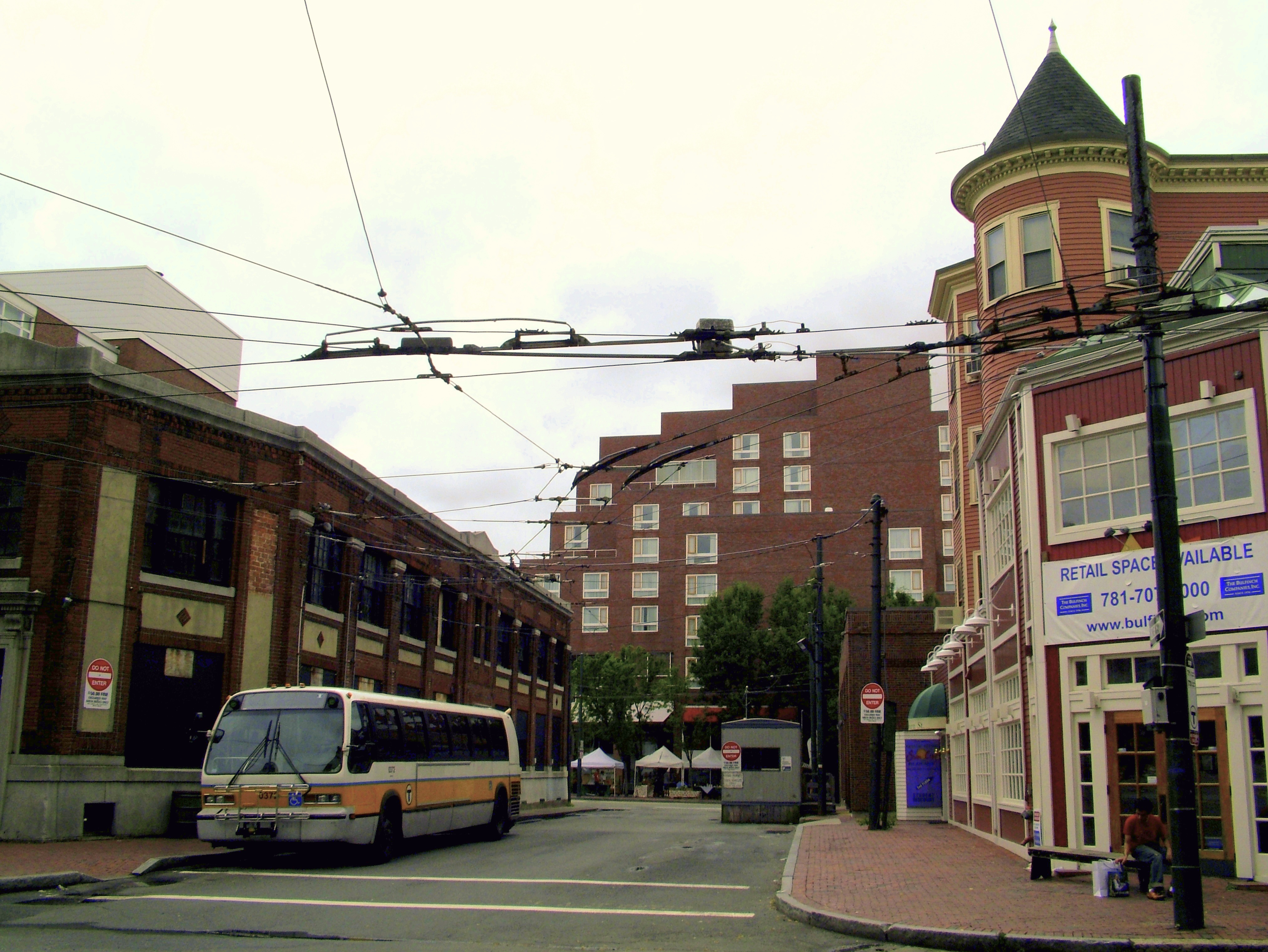
An MBTA bus next to the disused building in 2006

The BERy was folded into the Metropolitan Transit Authority in 1947, which in turn became part of the Massachusetts Bay Transportation Authority (MBTA) in 1964. With the streetcar lines converted to trackless trolleys and buses by the 1950s, Bennett Street Carhouse became a trackless trolley facility. It was closed around 1978 for the construction of the Red Line Northwest Extension, leaving Bennett Alley as a layover point for routes serving the tunnel. With most administrative functions centralized, the division headquarters was scarcely used by the MBTA and the building fell into disrepair.

Under the name Boston Elevated R.Y. Offices, it was added to the National Register of Historic Places on July 27, 1988 as a contributing property to an expansion of the Harvard Square Historic District. It is the last remaining building from the 1912 construction of the Cambridge Subway; the original station entrances, powerhouse, and carhouses have all been demolished.

=== Reuse ===
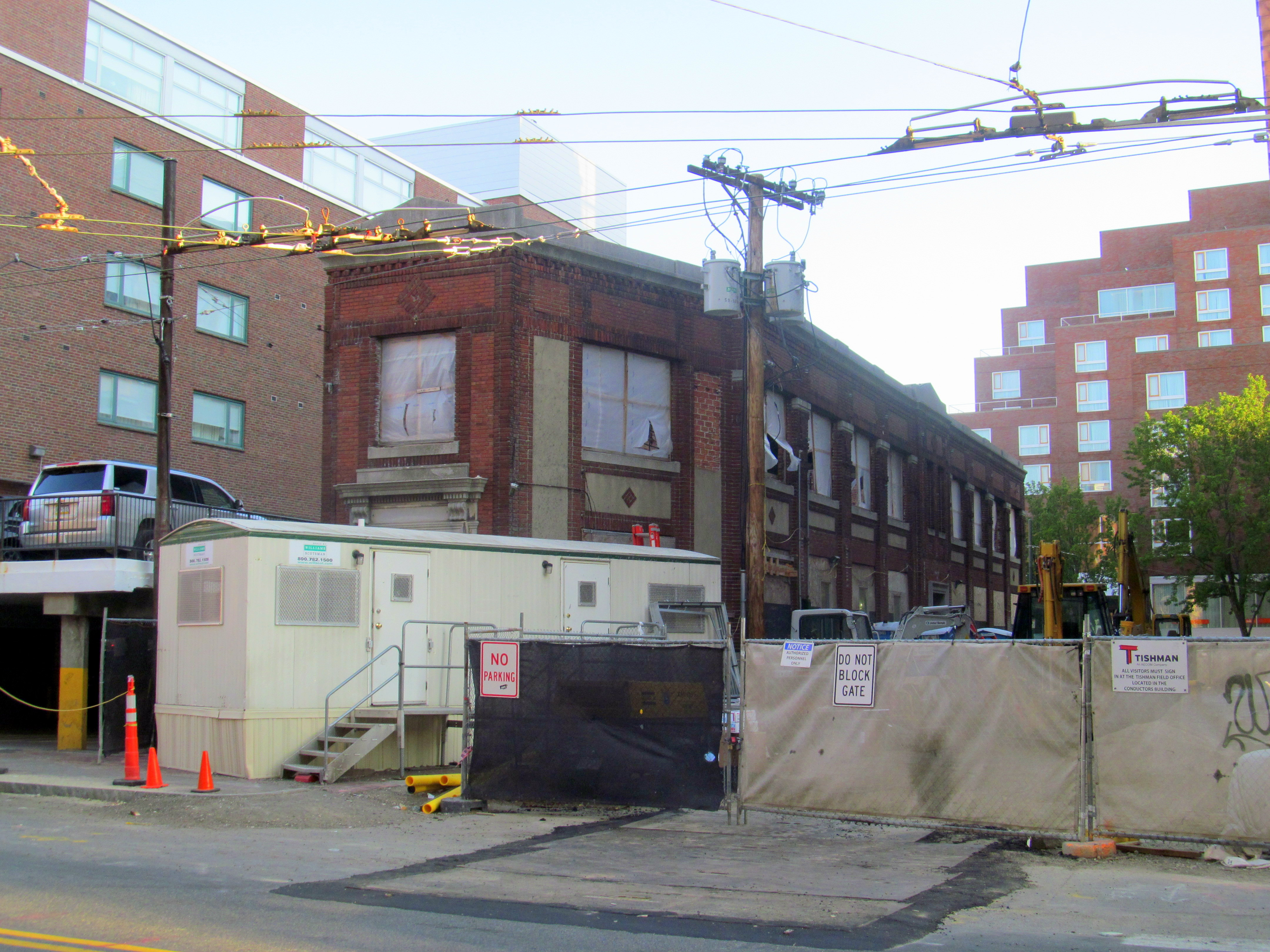
The building undergoing renovations in July 2015

The MBTA withdrew from the building entirely around 2000 due to unsafe conditions. In 2005, the agency began considering selling the building, by then known as the Conductor's Building, as part of a general effort to bring in revenue by auctioning off surplus property. Public reaction to the plan was mixed, with some residents and organizations concerned about the potential loss of a historic building, while others were warm to the possibility of revitalizing a dead spot in the square.

Carpenter & Company, which already owned the remainder of the block, bought the Conductor's Building plus Bennett Alley and an adjacent parcel containing an active MBTA transformer for $4 million in 2012. The MBTA retains a permanent easement to use Bennett Alley for buses. In February 2014, the company started construction on the $65 million development, which included an office building built over the MBTA transformer plus a renovation of the Conductor's Building, intended to turn it into "the longest bar in America".

The renovations were completed in early 2016 and Bennett Alley was reopened to buses. In March 2016, a group of restaurateurs announced plans to open a restaurant in the Conductor's Building by the end of 2016. The restaurant, Les Sablons, opened in April 2017 and closed in August 2018. An American Chinese restaurant and tiki bar, Wusong Road, opened in the building in December 2021.
