= Bay State Street Railway =

Former transportation company in Greater Boston, Massachusetts

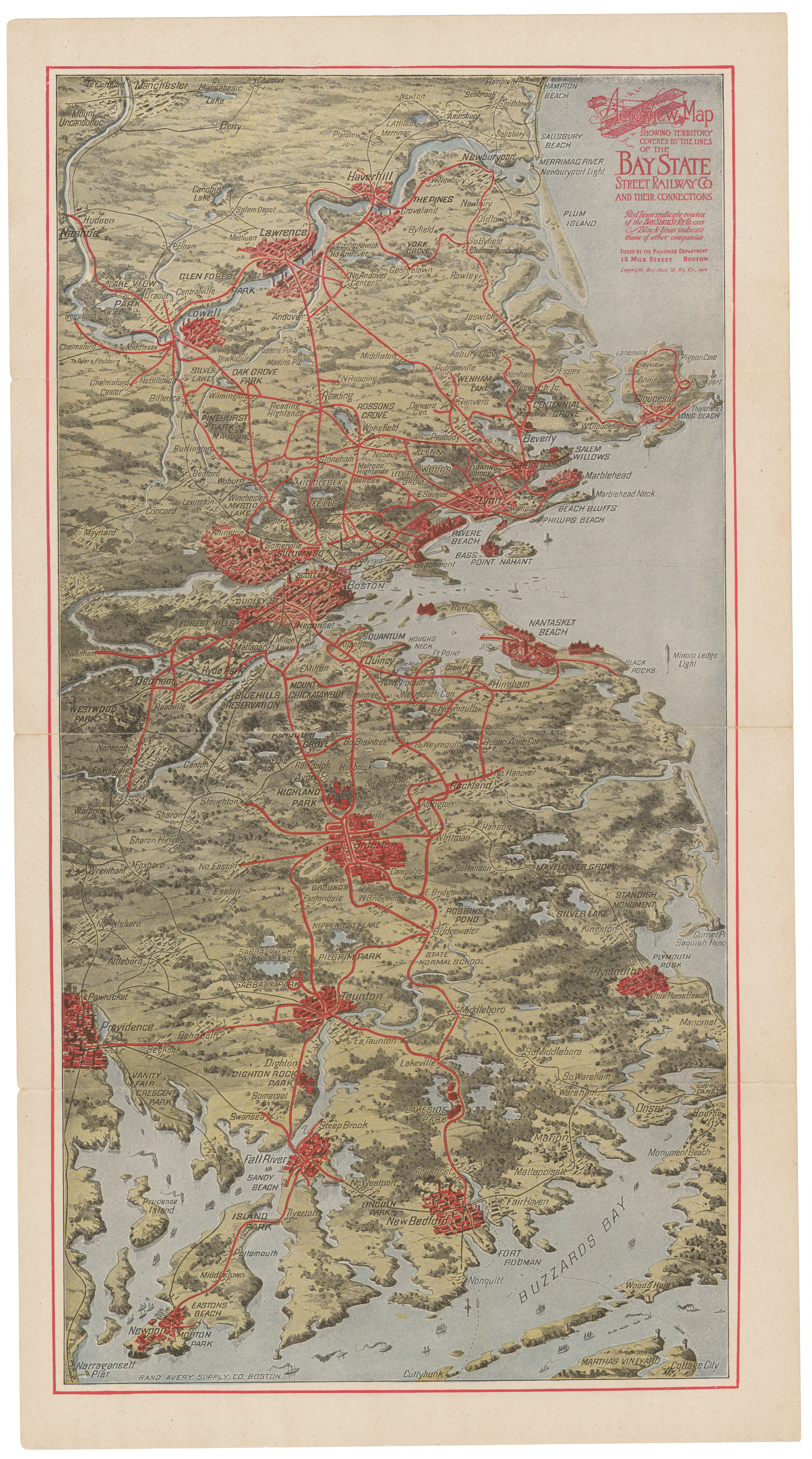
1912 Map of the Bay State Street Railway and connections by Rand Avery Co., courtesy of Historic New England.

The Bay State Street Railway Company was a horse-drawn and electric streetcar railroad operated on the streets of Boston, Massachusetts and communities directly north (stretching into New Hampshire) and south (extending into Rhode Island) of the city. Its immediate successor was the Eastern Massachusetts Street Railway, and its modern successor is the state-run Massachusetts Bay Transportation Authority (MBTA).

== History ==
The Bay State Street Railway Company (Bay State) was formed out of the merger of the Boston and Northern Street Railway (B&N), operating north of Boston, and the Old Colony Street Railway (OC), operating south of Boston. On December 12, 1917, the Bay State went into receivership. The Bay State was acquired by Eastern Massachusetts Street Railway Company on January 15, 1919.

== Constituent companies ==
=== Old Colony Street Railway Company ===
The Old Colony began operations on July 5, 1881 as the Brockton Street Railway Company The corporate name of the company was changed to Old Colony on February 7, 1901.

=== Boston and Northern Street Railroad Company ===
The B&N was chartered April 6, 1859 by Special Act of Legislature (chapter 202, Acts of 1859) as the Lynn and Boston Railroad Company (L&B), renamed July 23, 1901 to the Boston and Northern Street Railway Company (B&N) under authority of Chapter 360, Acts of 1891.

== Divisions ==
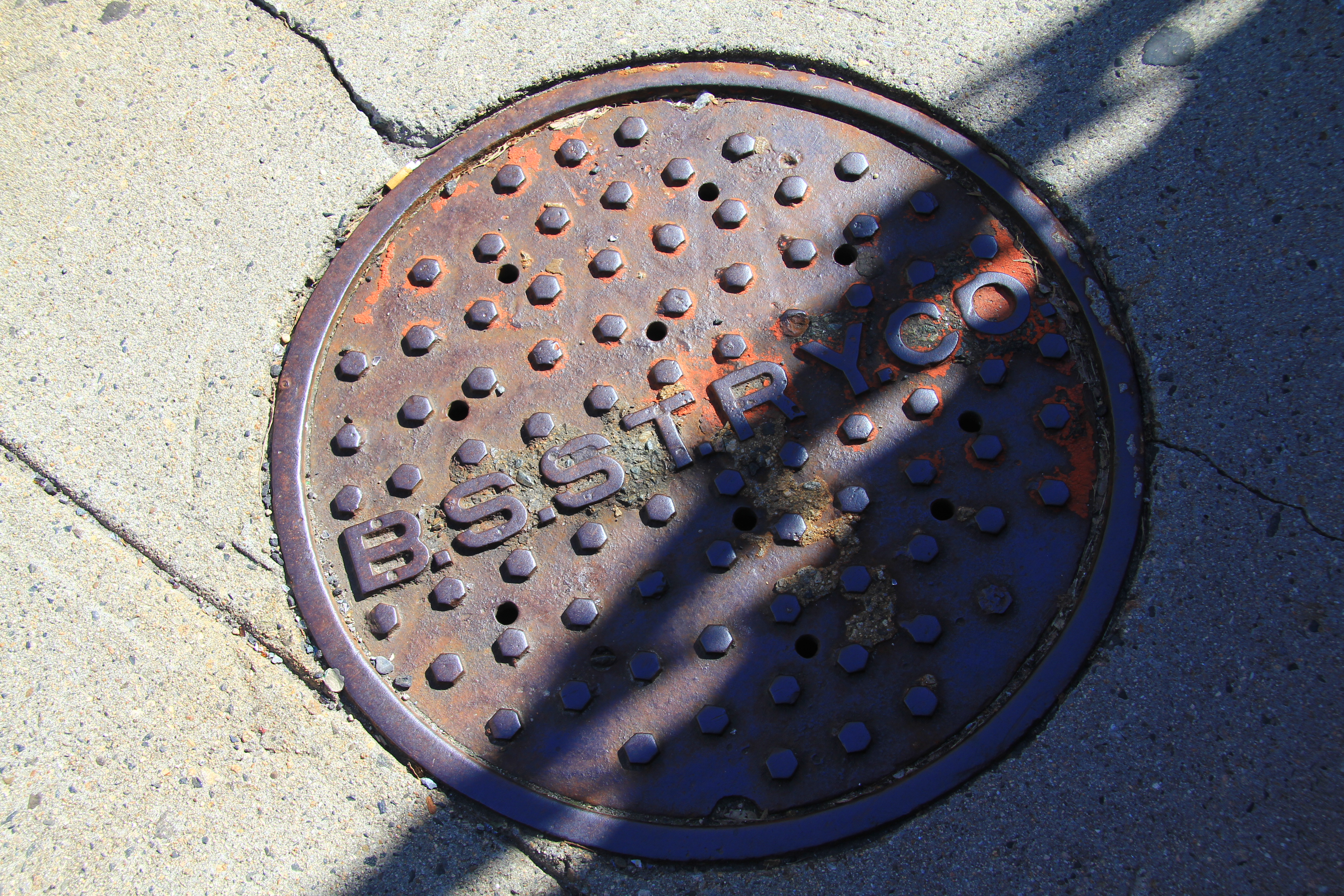
Bay State Street Railway manhole cover, September 2010

The Bay State had 16 divisions:

- NORTH
  - Chelsea (214 Broadway)
  - Gloucester (100 Main Street)
  - Haverhill (3 Water Street)
  - Salem (237 Essex Street)
  - Lawrence (586 Essex Street)
  - Lowell (5 Merrimack Square)
  - Lynn (333 Union Street)
  - Nashua (150 Main Street)
  - Wakefield (Reading Square)
  - Woburn (North Warren Street, Woburn Center)
- SOUTH
  - Brockton (87 Main Street)
  - Fall River (794 North Main Street)
  - Hyde Park (435 Hyde Park Avenue)
  - Newport (Vernon Avenue)
  - Quincy (Hancock Street)
  - Taunton (20 Winthrop Street)
