= Trolleybuses in Greater Boston =

Electric transit system in Massachusetts, US

Boston-area trolleybus system
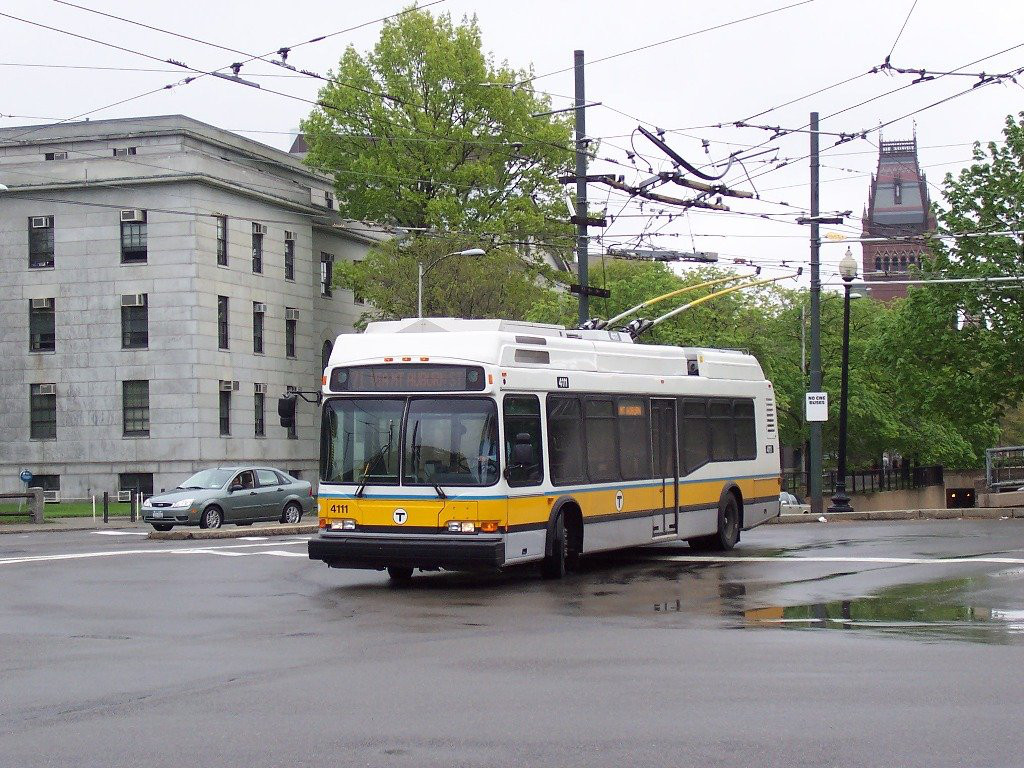
- A trolleybus on route 71 leaving the Harvard bus tunnel in 2006

Operation
- Locale: Greater Boston, Massachusetts, United States
- Open: April 11, 1936
- Close: June 30, 2023 (Note: The last vehicle in service operating as a trolleybus made its final trip in the first hour of July 1, at the end of the June 30 service day.)
- Operators: 1936–47: Boston Elevated Railway; 1947–64: Metropolitan Transit Authority; 1964–2023: Massachusetts Bay Transportation Authority (MBTA)

Infrastructure
- Electrification: Parallel overhead lines, 600 V DC

The Boston-area trolleybus (or, as known locally, trackless trolley) system formed part of the public transportation network serving Greater Boston in the U.S. state of Massachusetts. It opened on April 11, 1936, with a large network operating for the next quarter-century. Measured by fleet size, the Boston-area system was the second-largest trolleybus system in the United States at its peak (end of 1952), with only the Chicago system having more trolleybuses than Boston's 463 (with the Atlanta system being close behind Boston, with 453). After 1963, the only remaining portion was a four-route cluster operating from the Harvard bus tunnel at Harvard station, running through Cambridge, Belmont, and Watertown. The Massachusetts Bay Transportation Authority took over the routes in 1964.

The system was expanded by the Silver Line (Waterfront), a 2004-opened bus rapid transit network using dual-mode buses which ran as trolleybuses in a tunnel in the Seaport District of Boston before switching to diesel power to serve other destinations. The Harvard lines were converted to diesel hybrid buses in 2022, followed by the Silver Line in 2023.

== History ==
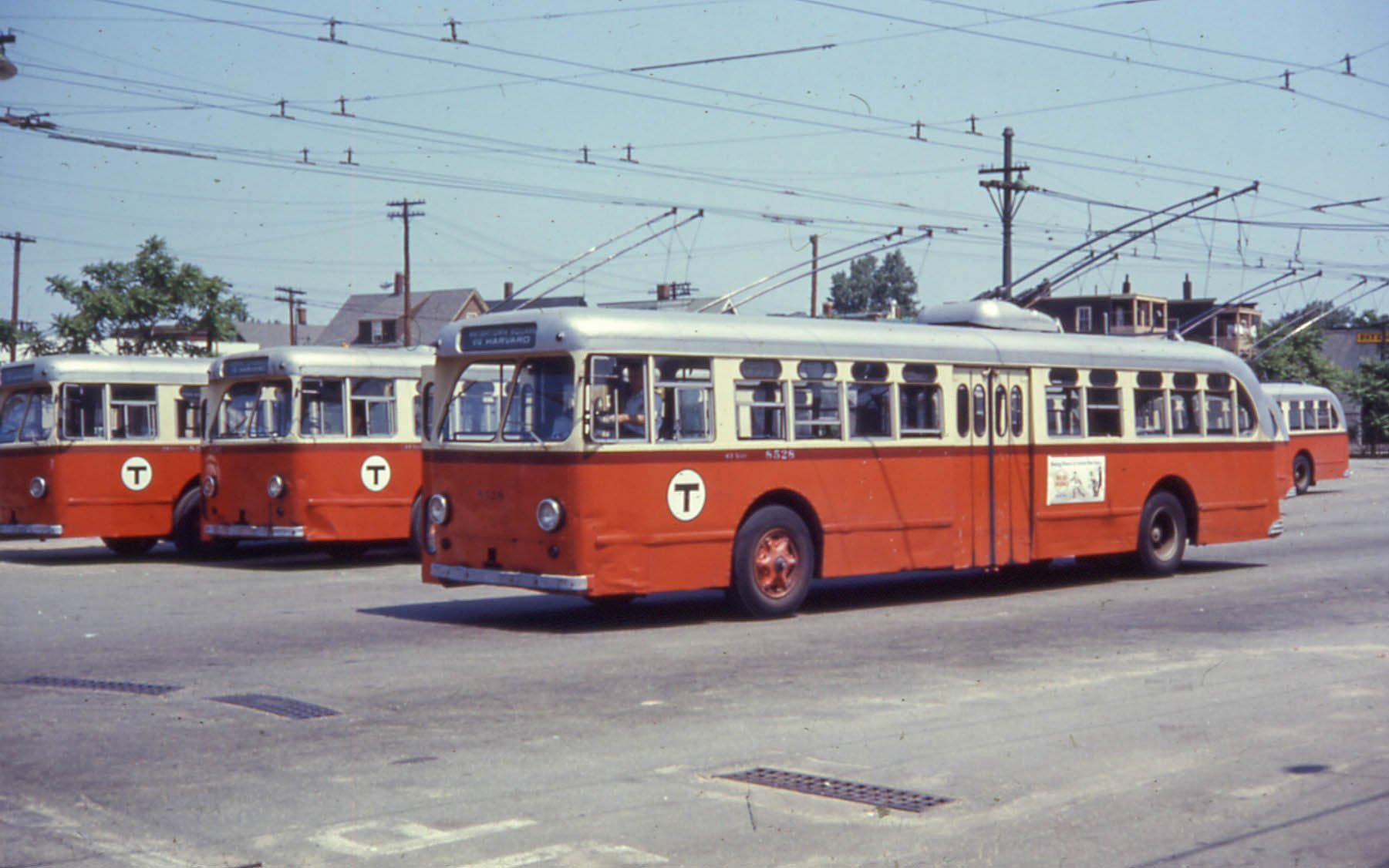
Pullman-Standard trolleybuses at North Cambridge Carhouse in 1967

Map showing the Greater Boston trolleybus network as of 1960 in black and dark red; lines in dark red survived until 2023. Segments abandoned before 1960 shown in yellow and subway lines as of 1960 shown in their modern colors.

The first trackless trolley line in the Boston transit system was opened by the Boston Elevated Railway (BERy) on April 11, 1936. Replacing a streetcar line over the same route, it was a crosstown line (later numbered 77, and today served by the 69 bus) running from Harvard station east to Lechmere station. (Substitution of buses for streetcars on the route had been proposed as early as 1930.) Additional lines were opened in 1937, and by 1942, the system had 14 lines, of which 10 were former streetcar lines and four were former motor bus lines. In 1947, the BERy was succeeded by the public Metropolitan Transit Authority (MTA) as the operator of Boston's urban transit system, and in 1964, the MTA was replaced by the Massachusetts Bay Transportation Authority (MBTA), which remains the system's operator today.

The BERy was owned by private investors, but came under public control from 1918. It served 13 municipalities of Greater Boston, including Boston proper. The MTA's service area was limited to these municipalities (with the addition of Revere). Following a change of management, the MTA began replacing trolleybuses with motorbuses, starting in 1958. Only four trolleybus lines remained after 1963, all based in Cambridge. Four decades later, the MTA's successor, the MBTA, built the Silver Line (Waterfront), and that line's opening in late 2004 reintroduced trolleybus service in Boston proper.

At the trolleybus system's peak, the maximum number of trolleybus routes in operation was 37, with most routes running in the near north suburbs of Boston. In addition, there were the disconnected Dorchester and Arborway networks.

Prior to the opening of the Silver Line, a total of 43 trolleybus lines had historically existed, but not all concurrently, making the all-time total 44 (counting the Silver Line trunk as one route) as of 2022.

=== Table of former trolleybus routes ===
Number	Termini		Major streets served	Date begun	Date ended
15	Kane Square	Dudley station	Hancock St, Dudley St	December 25, 1948	April 5, 1962
16	Franklin Park	Andrew station	Columbia Rd	December 10, 1949	April 5, 1962
17	Fields Corner station	Andrew station	Geneva Ave, Bowdoin St, Hancock St, Columbia Rd	February 12, 1949	April 5, 1962
19	Fields Corner station	Dudley station	Geneva Ave, Warren St	January 8, 1949	April 5, 1962
20	Fields Corner station	Neponset	Neponset Ave	January 8, 1949	April 5, 1962
22	Ashmont station	Dudley station	Talbot Ave, Blue Hill Ave, Warren St	January 8, 1949	April 5, 1962
23	Ashmont station	Dudley station	Talbot Ave, Washington St (Dorchester), Warren St	January 8, 1949	April 5, 1962
32	Cleary Square	Forest Hills station	Hyde Park Ave	April 25, 1953	September 30, 1958
34	Dedham line	Forest Hills station	Washington St	November 22, 1952	September 5, 1958
36	Charles River Loop, West Roxbury	Forest Hills station	Spring St, Centre St, Belgrade Ave, Washington St	November 22, 1952	September 5, 1958
44	Seaver St	Dudley station	Humboldt Ave	January 29, 1949	March 31, 1961
45	Grove Hall	Dudley station	Blue Hill Ave, Dudley St	December 25, 1948	April 5, 1962
70	Watertown Square	Central Square, Cambridge	Arsenal St, Western Ave	June 17, 1950	March 30, 1963
71	Watertown Square	Harvard station	Mount Auburn St	September 6, 1958	March 12, 2022
72	Aberdeen Ave & Mount Auburn St	Harvard station	Aberdeen Ave, Huron Ave, Concord Ave	April 2, 1938	March 2013
73	Waverley station	Harvard station	Trapelo Rd, Belmont St, Mount Auburn St	September 6, 1958	March 12, 2022
76	Harvard station	Massachusetts station	Massachusetts Ave	April 22, 1950	March 31, 1961
77	Harvard station	Lechmere station	Cambridge St (Cambridge)	April 11, 1936	March 30, 1963
80	Arlington Center	Lechmere station	Medford St (Arlington), Boston Ave, College Ave, Broadway (Somerville), Medford St (Somerville), McGrath Highway	September 30, 1958	March 30, 1963
81	Arlington Center	Clarendon Hill	Broadway (Arlington)	September 12, 1953	March 30, 1963
82/77A	North Cambridge carhouse	Harvard station	Massachusetts Ave	September 6, 1958	March 12, 2022
87	Clarendon Hill	Lechmere station	Somerville Ave, McGrath Highway	November 8, 1941	March 30, 1963
88	Clarendon Hill	Lechmere station	Highland Ave, McGrath Highway	November 8, 1941	March 30, 1963
89	Arlington Center	Sullivan Square station	Broadway (Arlington/Somerville)	December 7, 1946	March 30, 1963
90	Davis Square	Sullivan Square station	Highland Ave, Cross St (Somerville), Broadway (Somerville)	September 13, 1947	December 14, 1956
101	Salem St & Fellsway, Medford	Sullivan Square station	Salem St, Main St (Medford), Broadway (Somerville)	April 19, 1947	March 15, 1959
102	Faulkner, Malden	Malden Square	Cross St (Malden), Main St (Malden)	June 17, 1939	March 30, 1963
103	Malden Square	Everett station	Main St (Malden)	September 11, 1937	March 30, 1963
104	Malden Square	Everett station	Ferry St, Broadway (Everett)	December 31, 1938	March 30, 1963
105	Faulkner, Malden	Everett station	Cross St (Malden), Main St (Malden)	September 11, 1937	March 30, 1963
106	Lebanon, Malden	Everett station	Lebanon St, Salem St, Main St (Malden)	December 31, 1938	March 30, 1963
109	Linden, Malden	Everett station	Eastern Ave, Broadway (Everett)	November 28, 1936	March 30, 1963
110	Broadway & Park Ave, Revere (Woodlawn before September 7, 1940)	Everett station	Park Ave, Elm St, Ferry St, Chelsea St (Everett), Broadway (Everett)	June 19, 1937	March 30, 1963
112	Malden Square	Chelsea Square	Ferry St, Broadway (Everett), Chelsea St (Everett), Everett Ave	December 11, 1937	June 23, 1961
113	Malden Square	Chelsea Square	Ferry St, Chelsea St (Everett), Everett Ave	December 11, 1937	June 23, 1961
114	Woodlawn	Maverick station	Washington Ave, Pearl St (Chelsea), Meridian St	1954	March 31, 1961
115	Woodlawn	Wood Island station	Central Ave (Chelsea, Chelsea St (East Boston)	January 5, 1952	1954
116	Wonderland station	Wood Island station	Ocean Ave, Revere St, Broadway (Revere), Central Ave (Chelsea), Chelsea St (East Boston)	January 5, 1952	March 31, 1961
117	Wonderland station	Wood Island station	Ocean Ave, Beach St, Broadway (Revere), Central Ave (Chelsea), Chelsea St (East Boston)	January 5, 1952	March 31, 1961
118	Revere carhouse	Orient Heights station	Broadway (Revere), Revere St, Ocean Ave, Bennington St	January 5, 1952	June 18, 1955
120	Orient Heights station	Maverick station	Bennington St, Meridian St	January 5, 1952	September 8, 1961
121	Wood Island station	Maverick station	Lexington St, Meridian St	January 5, 1952	September 8, 1961

== Harvard-based routes ==
=== History ===
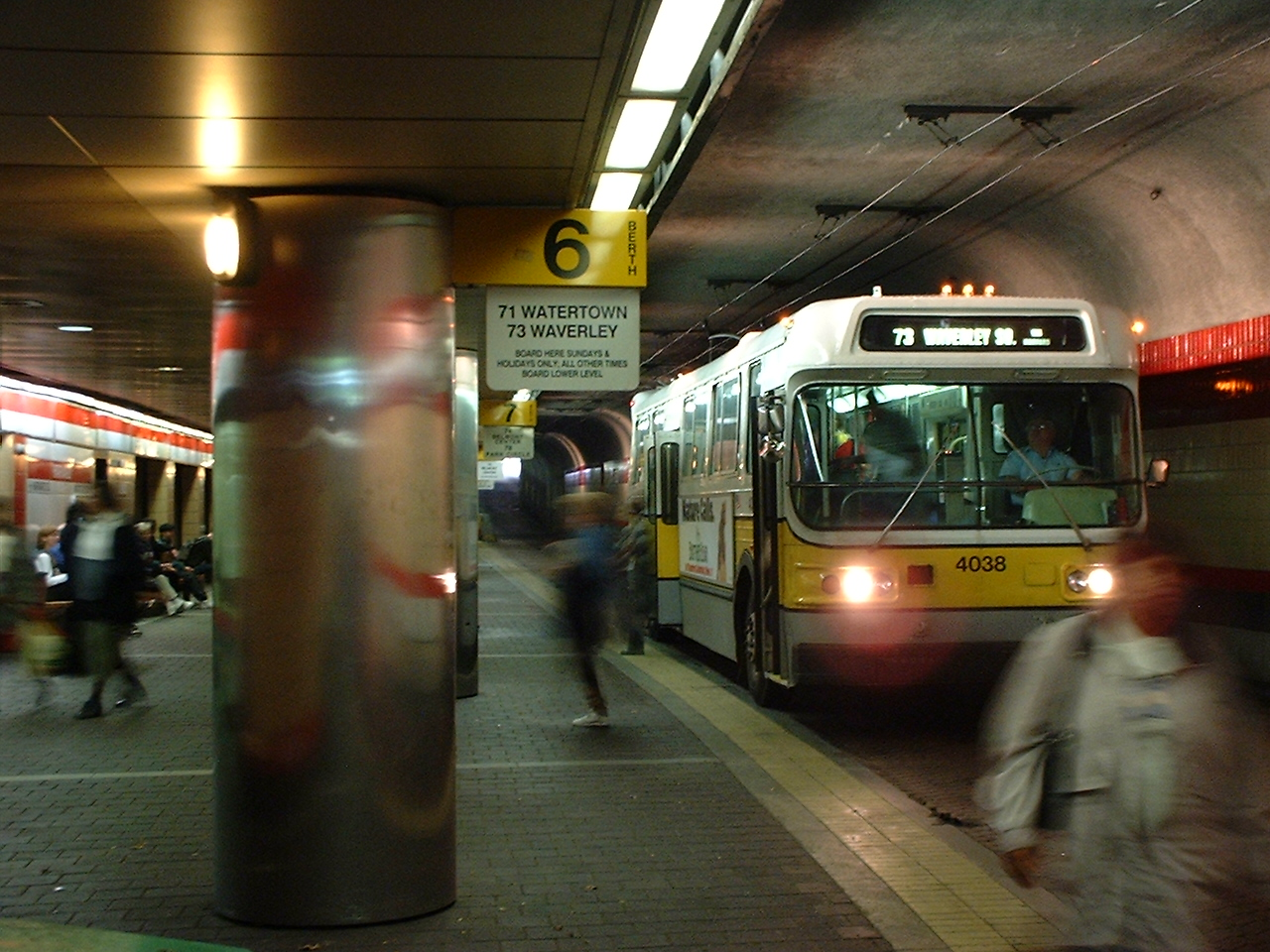
A Flyer trolleybus in the upper level of the Harvard bus tunnel in 2003

What became the Harvard-based trolleybus system began as branches of the Cambridge Railroad, a horsecar street railway that opened in 1856. Lines from Harvard Square to Mount Auburn via Brattle Street and Porter Square opened soon after the Harvard Square–Bowdoin Square route. The connecting Watertown Horse Railroad opened on April 27, 1857. The Porter Square branch was extended to the border of West Cambridge (now Arlington); there it met the West Cambridge Horse Railroad, which opened on June 13, 1859. In 1880, the Watertown line was extended south on Galen Street to Nonantum Square.

The Harvard–Arlington line was electrified on July 1, 1889 – one of the first lines converted by the West End Street Railway. Electric service between Watertown and Mount Auburn began on December 12, 1893; the line was double-tracked later in the decade. Residents of Brattle Street objected to the construction of electric lines; in October 1893, the Board of Railway Commissioners denied the West End permission to run electric streetcars on Brattle Street. That November, a compromise was worked out where the West End would instead build on Mount Auburn Street (which had been considered in 1891); a parallel line on Concord Avenue and Huron Avenue (ending at Aberdeen Avenue and Mount Auburn Street) would be opened within eight months, and the Brattle Street horsecar tracks removed in the same time frame. The Mount Auburn line opened in April or May 1894, with the Concord/Huron line opening later in the year.

A branch from Mount Auburn Street to Waverley Square in Belmont opened on October 1, 1898, despite Watertown's opposition earlier than year to widening Belmont Street. A branch to Belmont Center opened on June 30, 1906; it was replaced by buses in August 1928 and was never a trackless trolley route.

On April 1, 1938, trackless trolleys replaced streetcars on the Harvard–Aberdeen Avenue line (72). In 1955 the Harvard–Arlington Heights line was converted from streetcars to diesel buses, but streetcars continued to provide short-turn service between Harvard and North Cambridge. Starting in 1957, trackless trolleys provided short-turn service from Harvard to Benton Square on the route to Waverley. The Harvard–Watertown Square (71), Harvard–Waverley (73), and Harvard–North Cambridge (82, renumbered 77A c. 1967) lines were all converted from streetcars to trackless trolleys on September 6, 1958.

These four Harvard-based trackless trolley routes remained long after the rest of the bus system had converted to diesel and existed, in part, because of a desire to limit the number of diesel buses in the Harvard bus tunnel. Inside the portals, the tunnel splits into two one-way tunnels, upper and lower. The tunnel for eastbound-northbound vehicles is placed on top of the tunnel for southbound-westbound vehicles. The tunnels first opened for streetcars in 1912, and trolleybuses began using them in 1938. Streetcar service using the tunnel was abandoned in 1958. In a six-year project lasting from 1979 to 1985 (coinciding with the reconstruction of Harvard station during the Northwest Extension of the MBTA Red Line), the tunnel was closed for an extensive rebuilding, which included new platforms and a new northern portal ramp. (The preservation of these lines has also been attributed to the environmentalist movement of the 1970s.)

In January 2005 most route 77A (Harvard–North Cambridge) service was eliminated; the only remaining trips were pull-ins and pull-outs to take 71 and 73 buses to or from the carhouse. In March 2013, route 72 trackless trolleys were replaced with diesel buses to permit roadwork on Huron Avenue and reconstruction of the Conductor's Building in Bennett Alley. It was planned that route 72 would return to electric operation when construction was complete, but service was reduced to peak-only in December 2019 (in conjunction with improvements to routes 74 and 75 which also run on Concord Avenue), and all route 72 service was suspended indefinitely in December 2020.

In 2021 the MBTA announced plans to renovate the North Cambridge Carhouse facility by 2023 to accommodate battery electric buses, eliminating trolleybus operations on all Harvard-based routes. This included shifting the North Cambridge routes to another, unelectrified garage in 2022 to permit rebuilding of North Cambridge to begin unimpeded by active operations. Trolleybus service on the last two surviving routes, 71 and 73, ended on March 12, 2022. Multiple utility and road-rebuilding projects beginning in early 2022 led MBTA to decide to substitute diesel hybrid buses for trolleybuses at that time.

=== Vehicles ===
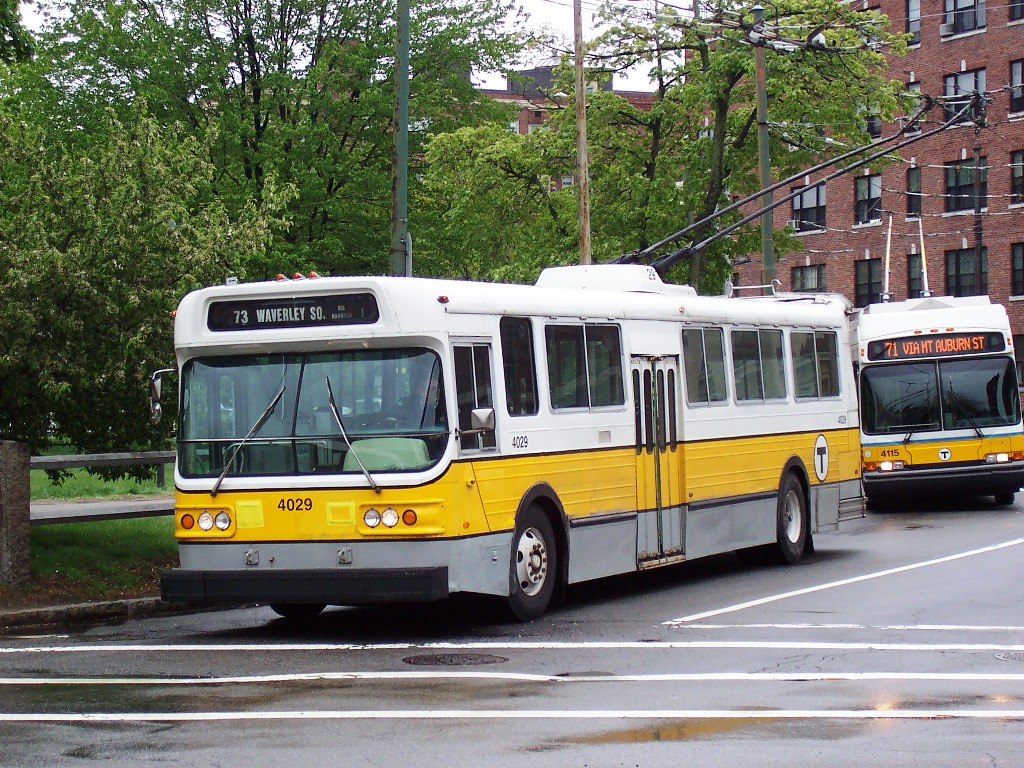
1976 Flyer E800 trolleybus at Cambridge Common, followed by the newer Neoplan AN-440LF trolleybus

In the lower/westbound tunnel, the loading platforms are located on the left side of the roadway, and for this reason the trolleybuses serving this station were equipped with left-side doors, in addition to the normal righthand doors, to avoid the need to board passengers from doors facing the wall rather than the platform. Diesel buses serving the tunnel are not equipped with left-side doors, and passengers boarding or deboarding at the westbound stop must cross the roadway to reach the buses' doors. In 2004, the MBTA began receiving a fleet of new trolleybuses from Neoplan USA, to replace Flyer E800 trolleybuses dating from 1976. The newer vehicles were low-floor vehicles and met Americans with Disabilities Act standards (see MBTA accessibility).

=== Operations ===
The vehicles for Harvard-based routes were all stored overnight and maintained at the North Cambridge Carhouse, the northern terminus of the 77A route. Trackless trolleys did not run on Sundays; instead, diesel buses covered the routes. This was the case since 1963.

To expedite passenger boarding through a left-side door in the southbound Harvard bus tunnel, the 71 and 73 trackless trolley routes allowed free entry for outbound trips, collecting fare upon later passenger exit from the vehicle.

== Silver Line ==
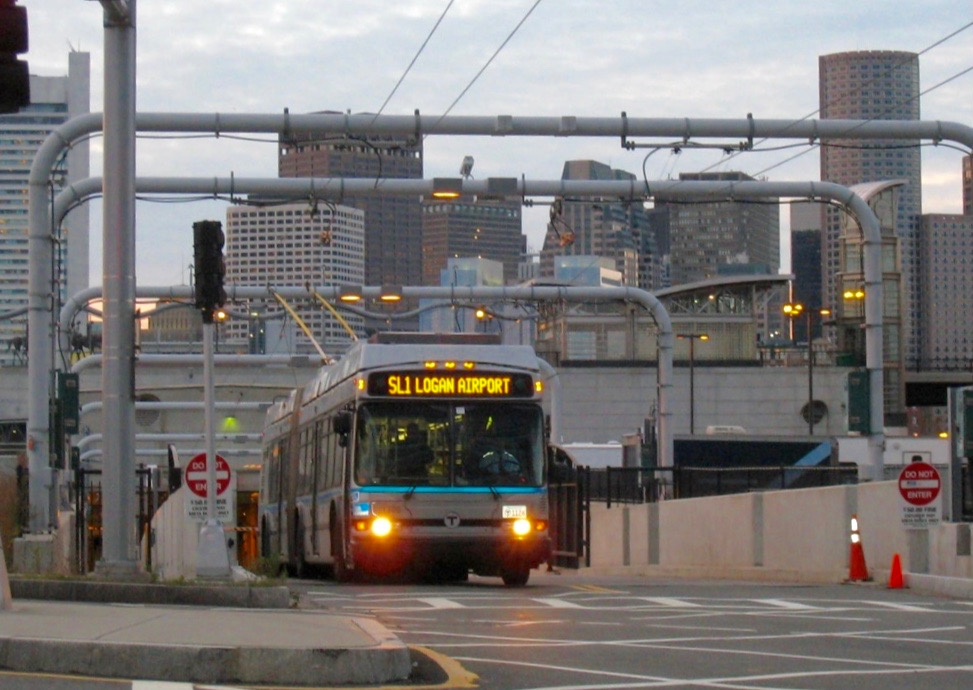
Dual-mode bus in electric mode at the top of the Silver Line tunnel ramp

A Silver Line dual-mode bus changes from diesel to electric mode at Silver Line Way.

The Silver Line is split into two sections; the diesel-powered Washington Street section runs entirely on the surface, but the Waterfront section runs through a dedicated tunnel under the South Boston Waterfront, in which diesel emissions would be problematic. Several routes branch out from the tunnel along routings where installation of overhead trolley wire would have been impractical, especially through the Ted Williams Tunnel (as overhead wires are expressly prohibited on interstate highways), so the Waterfront section used dual-mode buses. The vehicles ran as trolleybuses within the 1.3-mile-long (2.1 km) tunnel and for about 900 feet (270 m) on the surface, then changed to diesel power at the end of Silver Line Way, and reversed the transition when inbound. Motor buses are not permitted to operate inside the South Boston Waterfront tunnel due to insufficient ventilation. Four routes ran in the electrified Silver Line tunnel: SL1 to Logan Airport, SL2 to Design Center, SL3 to Chelsea, and a shuttle route which short turns at Silver Line Way.

Until February 2006, the Silver Line also used 12 of the then-new conventional-length Neoplan trackless trolleys until the entire articulated, dual-mode fleet could be placed into service; they were temporarily "wrapped" in the Silver Line's silver paint scheme, covering the standard MBTA yellow-and-white. Only three of the 32 dual-mode buses on order had been accepted for service by the time the Silver Line opened, but the number had increased to 28 by February 2006. In fall 2005 (five vehicles) and the first half of 2006, the 12 Neoplan trackless trolleys were transferred to the Harvard-based routes to replace the then-remaining Flyer trolleybuses operating out of North Cambridge Carhouse.

Following the testing of a small number of battery buses on the line starting in July 2019, MBTA placed an order in November 2020 for 45 articulated "extended-range" diesel hybrid buses to replace the 32 dual-mode buses used on the Silver Line. Those new hybrid buses began to enter service in January 2023, and over the next several months they gradually replaced the dual-mode buses. The last day of service for any dual-mode buses, and the last day of use of the overhead trolley wires, was June 30, 2023 (with the only bus in service on that date making its last trip shortly after midnight, in the first hour of July 1). This development marked the permanent closure of the Boston trolleybus system and was the first abandonment of a U.S. trolleybus system in more than 50 years—since the closure of the Chicago system in March 1973.

== Fleet ==
Boston's first trolleybuses were built by Pullman-Standard in 1936. Boston Elevated continued to buy its trolleybuses almost exclusively from Pullman, and until 1950 Pullmans comprised the entire fleet with the exception of a small batch of five Twin Coach trolleybuses purchased in 1937. In 1952, Boston had more Pullman-built trolleybuses than any other city, with 438. Meanwhile, 25 ACF-Brill trolleybuses built in 1950 were the only other purchase of non-Pullman trolleybuses until 1976. With several route closures in 1964, the Twin Coaches and the oldest Pullmans were retired, leaving only Pullmans built in 1947–51 in service.

These were all replaced in 1976–77 by a fleet of 50 Flyer E800s (4000–4049), the first of which arrived in February 1976 and entered service in April. The last Pullman-Standard trolleybuses were retired in August 1977. The Flyers were, in turn, replaced by new trolleybuses over the period 2004–06. Regular use of Flyers ended in June 2006, but a small number remained active and used very sporadically until March 2007. The only subsequent – and the final – use occurred on December 21, 2007, when the last two active Flyers (4006 and 4016) entered service briefly after all-night sleet-cutting duty (scraping ice off of the overhead wires).

In its final years the network that served Cambridge and vicinity used a fleet of 28 40-foot (12 m) vehicles. The order for these was placed in December 2000, in a single contract with the vehicles for the Silver Line, but the first vehicle (4101) was not completed and delivered until 2003. Except for the first unit, these trolleybuses (numbered 4101–4128) were delivered in 2004 and were the first low-floor trolleybuses in North America. The first day of service for trolleybuses in this series was June 4, 2004.

The Silver Line fleet consisted of 32 60-foot (18 m) low-floor, articulated dual-mode buses (numbered 1101–1132). These were built by Neoplan USA and fitted with Škoda electrical equipment, and delivered in 2004–2005. Eight of the buses (1125–1132) were funded by Massport and came equipped with luggage racks for airport passengers (and fewer seats than the other buses, 38 instead of 47), for use on route SL1, which serves Logan International Airport. In January 2011, four more buses (1121–1124) were also equipped with luggage racks in place of some seats.

== See also ==
- List of trolleybus systems in the United States
