= Eastern Massachusetts Street Railway =

Former streetcar company in Massachusetts

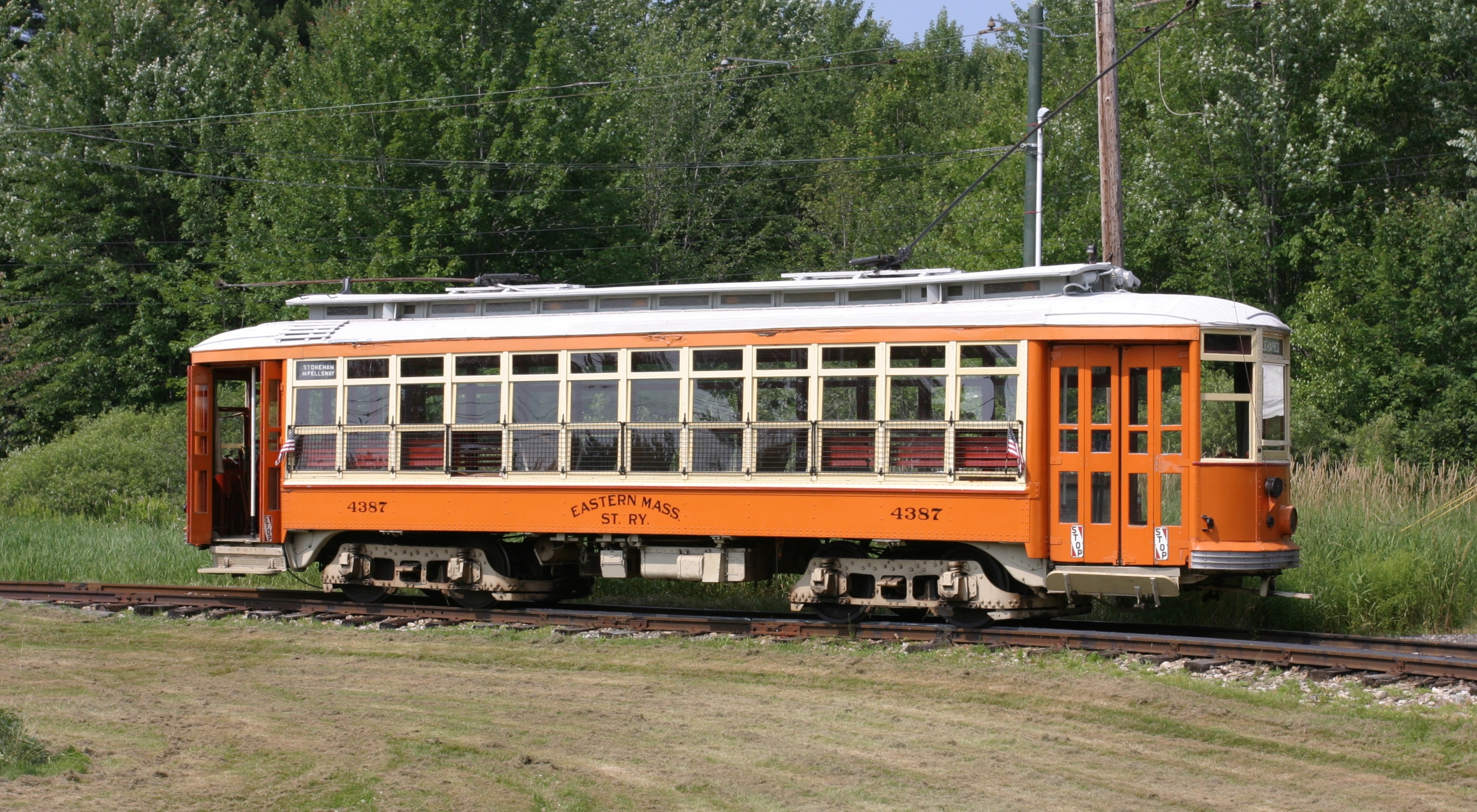
Ex-Eastern Mass. Street Railway car 4387 at the Seashore Trolley Museum

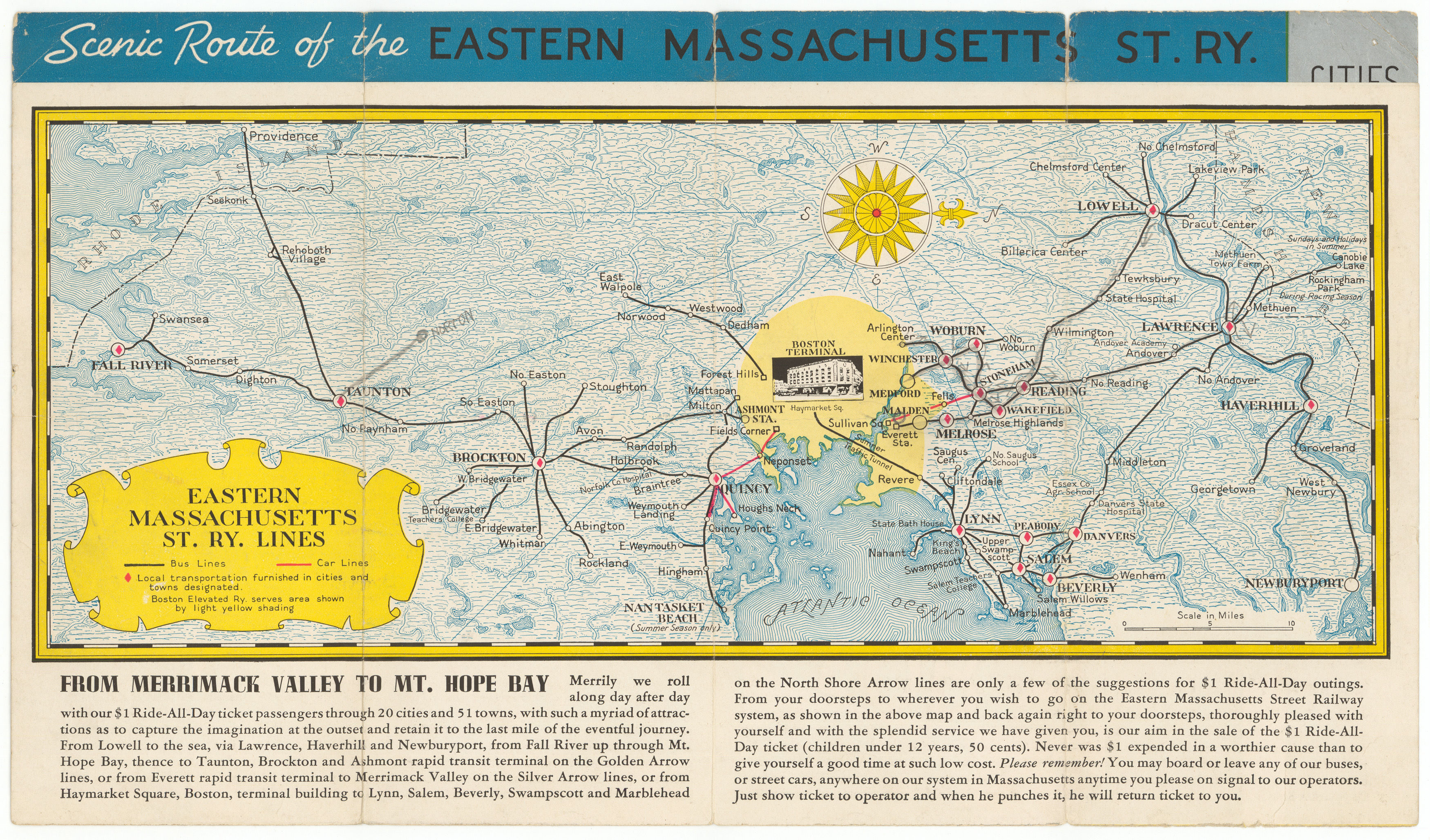
1930s map of Eastern Mass streetcar and bus lines

The Eastern Massachusetts Street Railway (Eastern Mass) was a streetcar and later bus company in eastern Massachusetts, serving northern and southern suburbs of Boston, Massachusetts. Its precursor company was the Bay State Street Railway, which it absorbed in 1919. It was acquired by Massachusetts Bay Transportation Authority, which still runs some of its routes, in 1968.

== History ==
The Lynn and Boston Street Railway originally ran into downtown Boston via the Chelsea Bridge and Warren Bridge, running over tracks of the Boston Elevated Railway (BERy) and its precursors in Charlestown and Boston. When the northern section of the Tremont Street Subway opened in 1898, Lynn and Boston cars were routed into the subway via the Canal Street Incline, looping at Scollay Square station. This continued for 37 years under the Boston and Northern Street Railway, the Bay State Street Railway, and finally the Eastern Mass.

The year-long closure of the Chelsea Bridge for repairs in 1935 eliminated the route to the subway (though early plans called for streetcar service to continue during repairs.) On January 14, 1935, the Eastern Mass curtailed all routes to Chelsea Square as the bridge closed. Buses operated between Chelsea Square and Haymarket Square via the Meridian Street Bridge and the newly opened Sumner Tunnel under a permit issued just two days prior. The bridge reopened on December 23, 1935, without streetcar tracks; the Eastern Mass continued its bus operations.

On August 10, 1935, the Eastern Mass began operation of a Middleton–Salem–Lynn–Boston bus route. The new route used the American Legion Highway, Lee Burbank Highway, and William McClellan Highway through Revere to reach the Sumner Tunnel, rather than the streetcar route on Broadway and Meridian Street. That October, remaining through service from north of Lynn to Chelsea was replaced by buses after Revere approved the permit. (Routes longer than 20 miles, such as the Boston–Middleton route, could be approved by the state, but shorter routes required permits from all municipalities.) Local streetcar service on Chelsea Division routes in Chelsea and Revere remained, as did Chelsea–Lynn local service.

The remaining Lynn and Salem routes were soon converted to bus: Lynn–Salem via Loring Avenue in March 1936, Lynn–North Saugus in April, Lynn–Salem via Eastern Avenue in September, Salem–Marblehead in February 1937, three Lynn local routes in March, Lynn–Swampscott on June 6, and finally Lynn–Saugus Center and Lynn–Cliftondale Square in November 1937.

In September 1935, Eastern Mass stockholders approved a deal to sell the Chelsea Division to the BERy. The transfer took effect on June 10, 1936, at a cost to the BERy of $1.5 million. The two Chelsea–Revere Beach routes were extended to Maverick, with Chelsea–Boston bus service discontinued. Chelsea–Lynn service was jointly operated by the two companies for a short period, but soon discontinued in favor of a transfer between the Boston–Lynn bus route and BERy streetcar service on Revere Street. Several of the lines were converted to trackless trolley by the BERy in 1937, while three remained as streetcar lines until the Revere Extension opened in 1952. On April 5, 1937, the company opened its new bus terminal in Haymarket Square.

== Major cities served ==
The Eastern Massachusetts Street Railway, and previously the Bay State Street Railway, ran direct or indirect interurban services from Boston to these cities.

- Revere
- Lynn
- Salem
- Reading
- Lowell
- Lawrence
- Haverhill
- Brockton
- Taunton
- Fall River
- Nashua, New Hampshire service ended in 1919
- Newport, Rhode Island service ended in 1919

== BERy connection points ==
The Eastern Mass connected to the Boston Elevated Railway (BERy) system at many points; through service continued along BERy trackage at some.

- Neponset
- Milton Lower Mills
- Mattapan
- Forest Hills - the Hyde Park division was leased to the BERy ca. 1930, unifying routes across Forest Hills but creating other connection points.
- Arlington Heights
- West Medford
- Middlesex Fells
- Malden Center
- Charlestown
- Chelsea - the Chelsea division was sold to the BERy in 1936, unifying routes across Charlestown and Chelsea but creating other connection points.
- Suffolk Downs
- Fields Corner

== Preserved cars ==
Former Eastern Massachusetts Street Railway car 4387, built in 1918 by the Laconia Car Company, is preserved in operating condition at the Seashore Trolley Museum, in Kennebunkport, Maine.
