= North Cambridge carhouse =

Bus garage in Massachusetts

Coordinates: 42°23′50″N 71°7′44″W

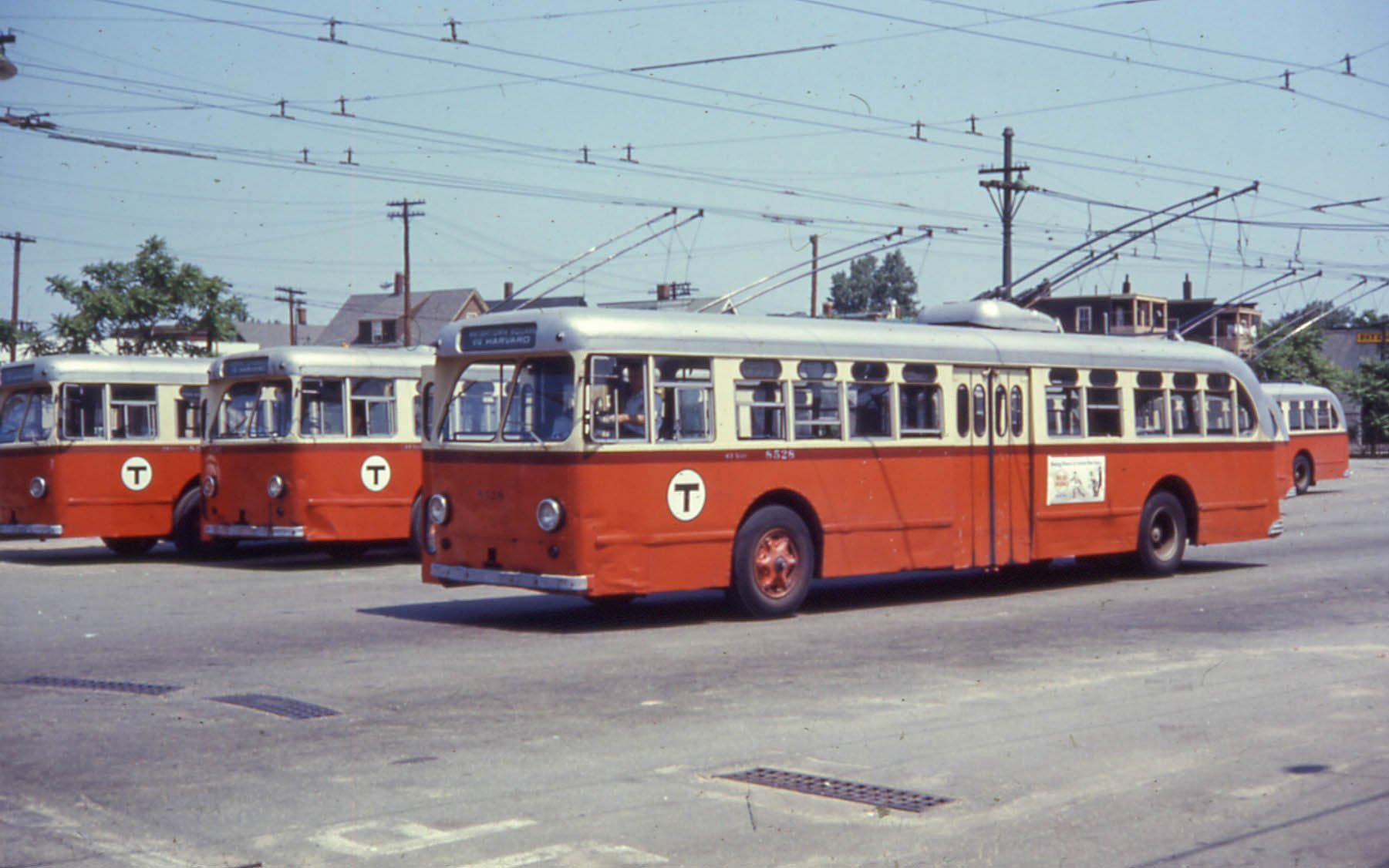
Trolleybuses in North Cambridge yard in 1967

The North Cambridge carhouse is a bus garage for trolleybuses, and a former streetcar carhouse, in Cambridge, Massachusetts, which is owned and operated by the Massachusetts Bay Transportation Authority (MBTA). It was first built in 1874. The current structure dates from 1979 and is located in the North Cambridge neighborhood at 2375 Massachusetts Avenue. It is one of two MBTA garages used in operation of the Boston-area trolleybus system (along with the Southampton Garage, where Silver Line dual-mode buses are maintained).

== History ==
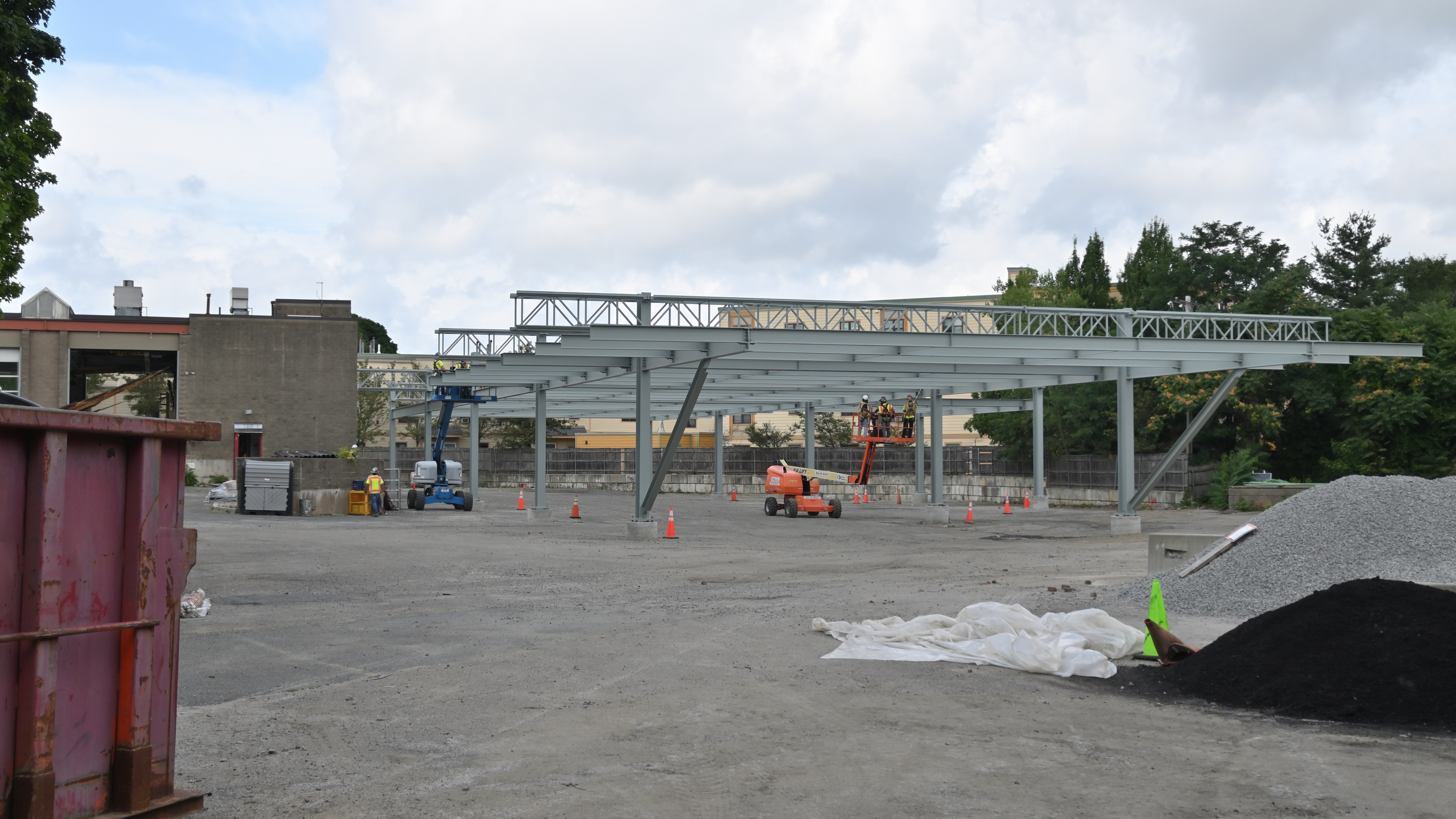
Construction progress on the new North Cambridge bus garage in late July 2024

The carhouse and yard date to the 1874 construction of a brick building with a clock tower that was constructed by the Union Railway. It remained in use until 1889 when the replacement of horsecars by electric streetcars made the structure obsolete. In 1897, the West End Street Railway constructed a larger structure, which existed for the next forty years until it was demolished in 1937. In 1979, the present structure was constructed to house the trolley buses which became active on the line in 1958.

The carhouse was the northern terminus of route 77A, which operated as a short turn of the 77 to supply trolleybuses for the 71, 72, and 73 routes.

Trolleybus service ended in March 2022. The MBTA is retrofitting the facility to accommodate battery electric buses. A $27.3 million construction contract was issued in October 2023. As of December 2025 the garage modifications are complete. Bus service from the garage is expected to start in 2026.

== See also ==
- List of Massachusetts Bay Transportation Authority yards
