= Gloucester Street Railway =

The Gloucester Street Railway was a former streetcar railway operating in Gloucester, Massachusetts. Originally incorporated as a horsecar railway in 1886, the railway underwent an ownership change in 1891. The railway was electrified and nearly doubled in length. In 1900, the railway was sold to the Lynn and Boston Railroad.

== Route ==
The Gloucester Street Railway operated a line approximately 9.4 miles in length. The northern terminus on the line was near the Rockport town line in Gloucester's Lanesville neighborhood. The line ran towards downtown Gloucester, following Washington Street for its entirety and passing through the village of Annisquam. The line then ran through downtown on Main Street and proceeded down East Main Street to its southern terminus in Rocky Neck, Gloucester.
