= Winnisimmet Street Railway =

The Winnisimmet Street Railway was a former streetcar railroad in Chelsea, Massachusetts. The railway was incorporated on May 26, 1857, as a horsecar railway, running between Chelsea's Prattville neighborhood and the Winnisimmet Ferry to Boston's North End. The line was later leased to the Lynn and Boston Railroad.
