= Lynn Belt Line Street Railway =

Former street railway in Massachusetts, US

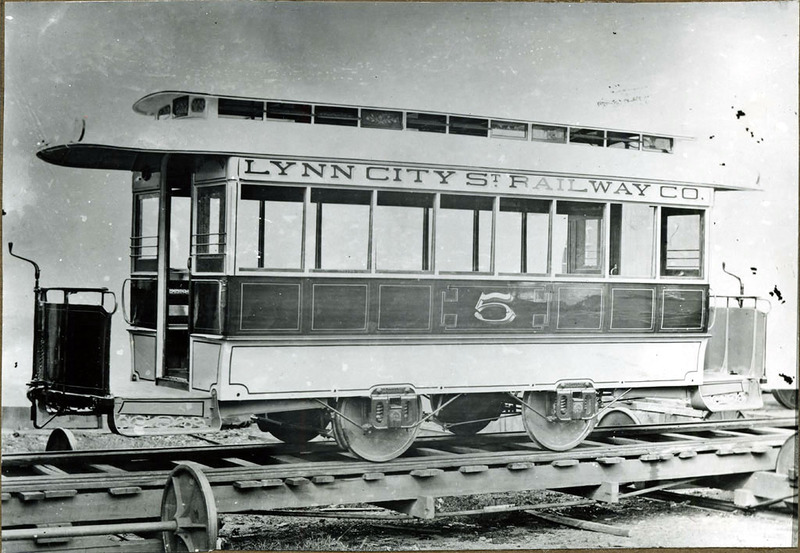
Electric car of the Lynn City Street Railway Company

The Lynn Belt Line Street Railway was a former street railway which was chartered for operation in Lynn, Massachusetts in 1889. The line first operated on May 30, 1890.

== Route ==
The street railway ran from a point near Central Square, through East Lynn, Glenmere, West Lynn, and back to Central Square - a circuit of about six miles.

== Demise ==
In 1892, the Belt Line was purchased by the Lynn and Boston Railroad. When the Eastern Railroad undertook a grade separation project for its Boston-Portland mainline, the line's circuit was disrupted, leading to the use of an alternate, parallel line. Many customers continued to use this alternate line after service to the Belt Line was restored, leading to a motion for abandonment. East Lynn residents protested the abandonment, claiming it would leave them without proper access to the Central and Narrow Gauge railroad stations, as well as several large industries.

== See also ==
Annual Report of the Public Service Commission. 1919.
