= Lynn and Boston Railroad =

Streetcar railway in Massachusetts, USA

The Lynn and Boston Railroad was a streetcar railway chartered for operations between Boston and Lynn, Massachusetts in 1859. Following a number of acquisitions, the railway was a part of a 1901 street railway merger that formed the Boston and Northern Street Railway.

The Thomson-Houston Electric Company developed and implemented electrification in Lynn on the Highland Circuit route of the Lynn & Boston, the first electrified streetcar in Massachusetts with regular electric service begun November 19, 1888. The electrified cars were able to ascend the steep 8% grade into the Lynn Highlands far easier than even a team of four horses.

== Acquisitions ==
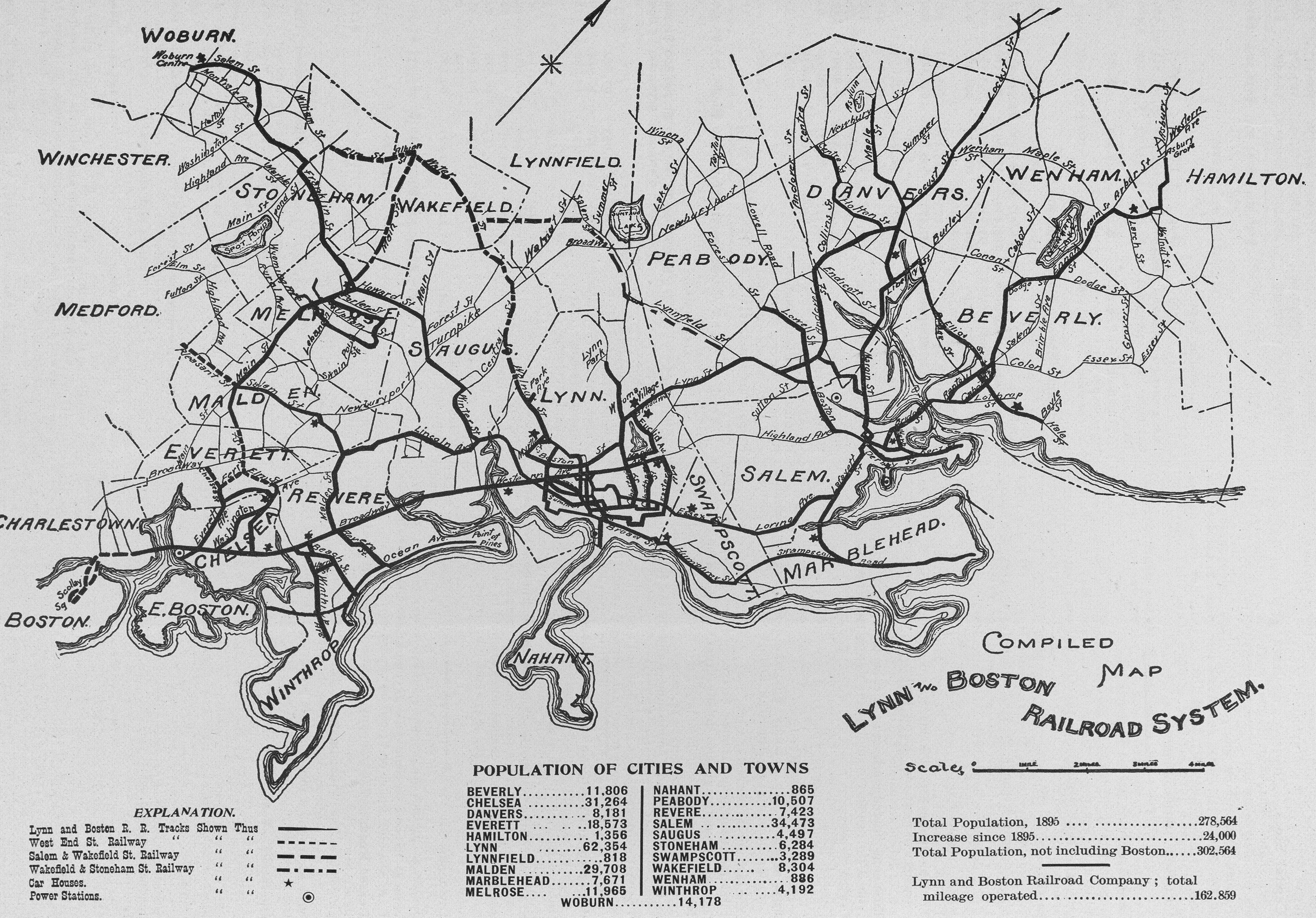
Circa-1900 map of the Lynn and Boston system after most of its acquisitions were complete

- Boston and Chelsea Railroad (leased in 1880)
- East Middlesex Street Railway (leased in 1893)
- Essex Electric Street Railway (purchased in 1894)
- Lynn Belt Line Street Railway (purchased in 1894)
- Naumkeag Street Railway (purchased in 1894)
- Salem and Danvers Street Railway (leased to NSR in 1887, lease transferred to L&BSR in 1894)
- Salem Street Railway (leased to NSR, lease transferred to L&BSR in 1894)
- Boston and Revere Electric Street Railway (leased in 1895)
- Gloucester Street Railway (purchased in 1900)
- Gloucester and Rockport Street Railway (leased to GSR in 1895, lease transferred to L&BSR in 1900, purchased by L&BSR in 1901)
- Wakefield and Stoneham Street Railway (purchased in 1900)
- Beverly and Danvers Street Railway (purchased in 1901)
- Winnisimmet Street Railway (leased)

== Merger ==
In 1901, the Lynn and Boston Railroad merged with the Lowell, Lawrence and Haverhill Street Railway and the North Woburn Street Railway. The result was the formation of the Boston and Northern Street Railway.

== See also ==
- Massachusetts list of streetcar systems
