= Boston Elevated Railway =

Transit company in the Boston metro area (1894–1947)

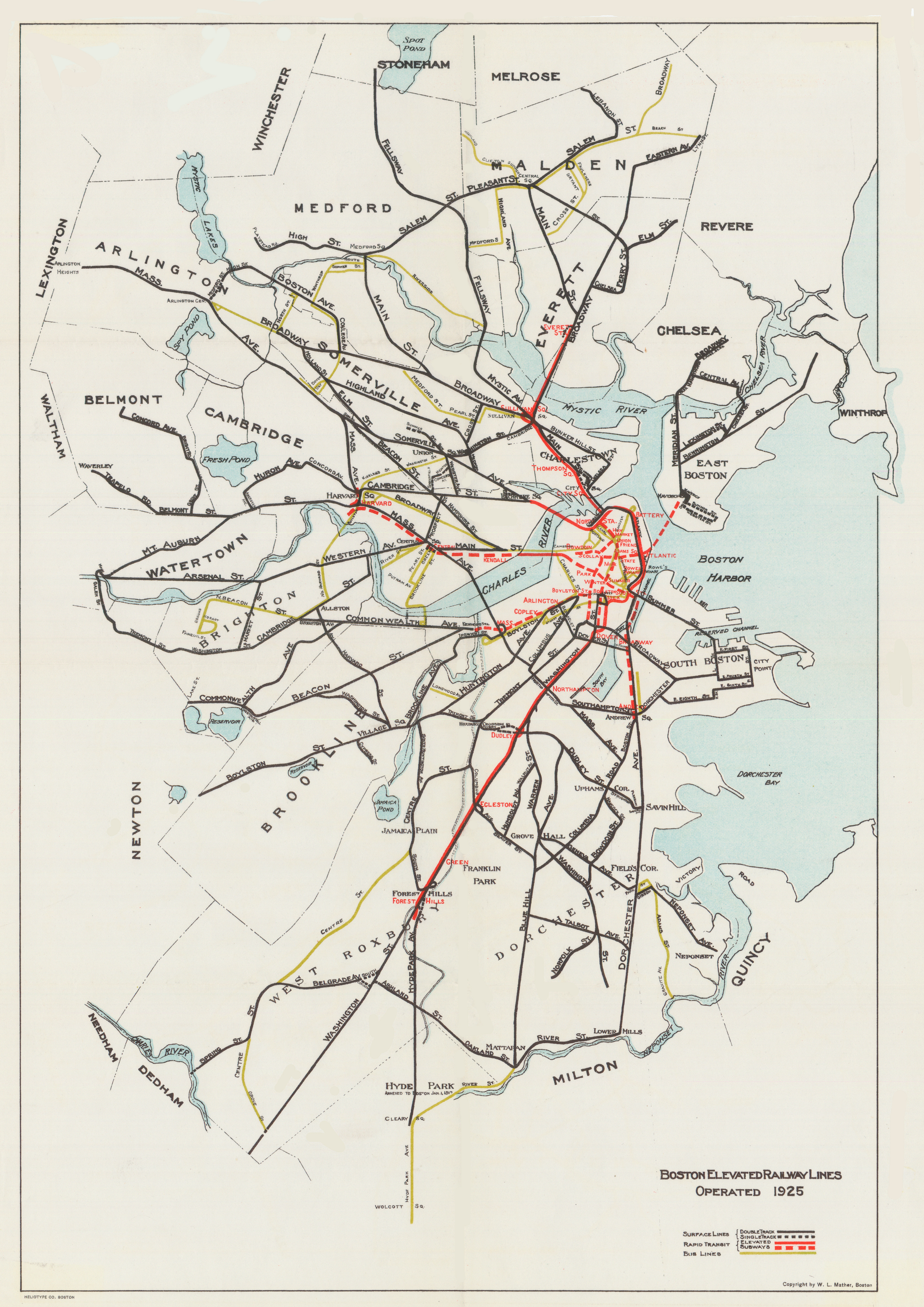
- System map, 1925

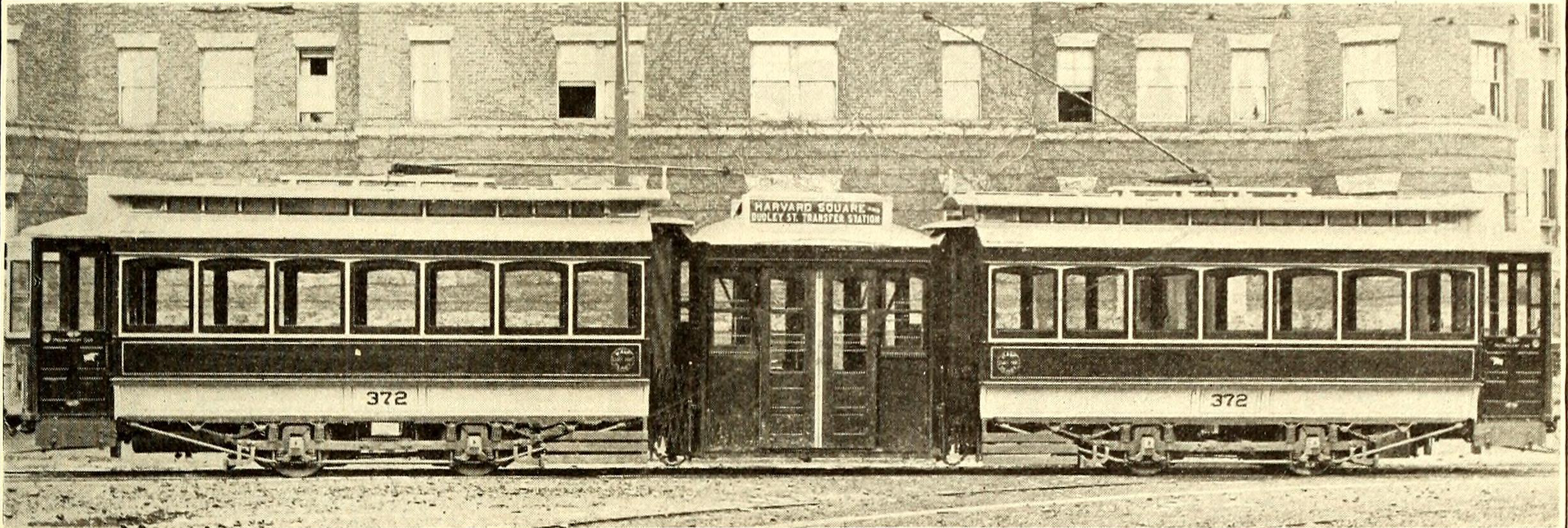
- The Boston Elevated Railway pioneered the use of articulated streetcars, seen here in 1913

Overview
- Area served: Greater Boston
- Transit type: Elevated railway; Street railway; Trolleybus; Motor bus

Operation
- Began operation: 1897 (129 years ago)
- Ended operation: 1947 (79 years ago)

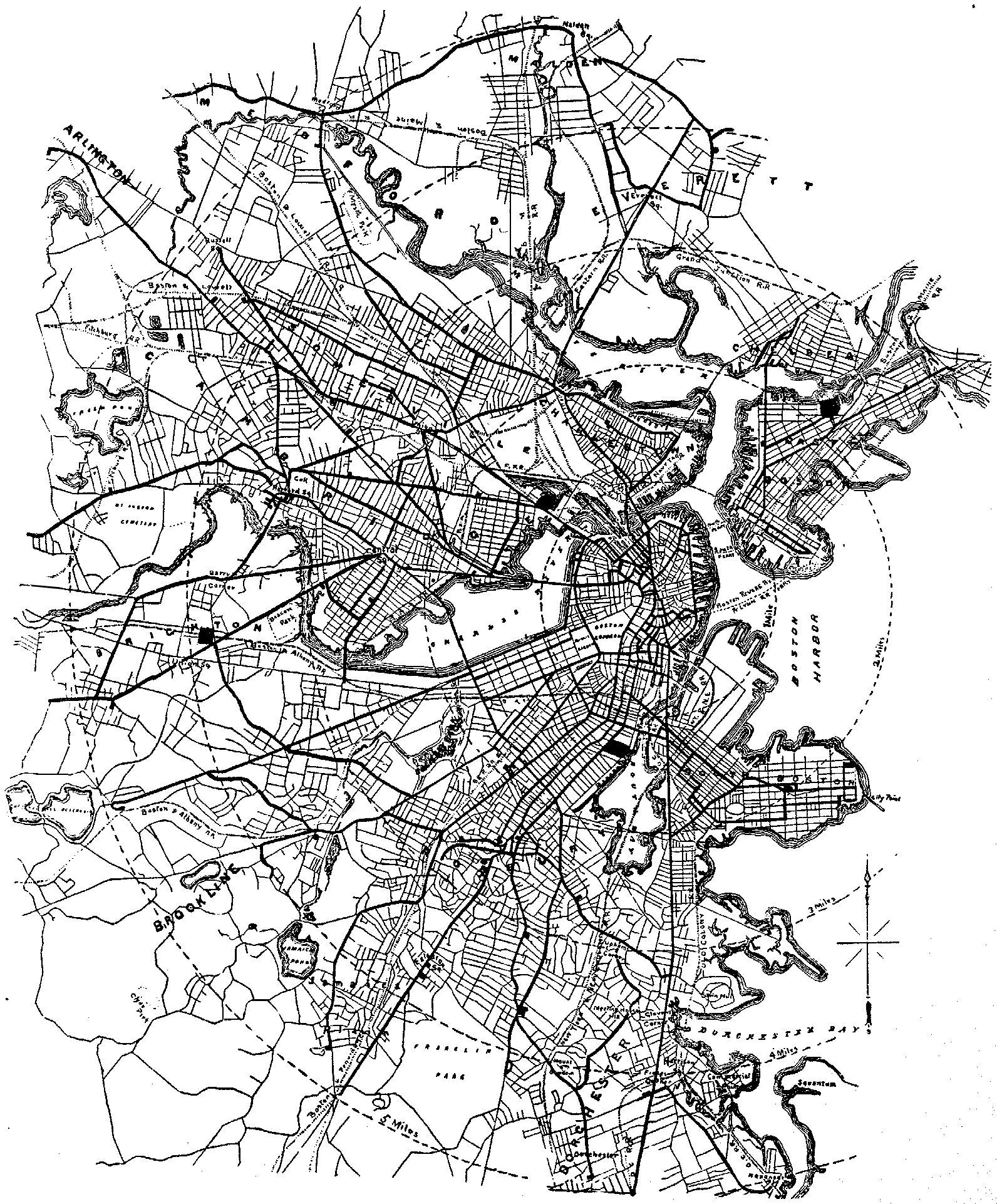
Map of the planned West End Street Railway network from 1885. These existing routes were officially merged in 1887.

The Boston Elevated Railway (BERy) was a streetcar and rapid transit railroad operated on, above, and below, the streets of Boston, Massachusetts, and surrounding communities. Founded in 1894, it eventually acquired the West End Street Railway via lease and merger to become the city's primary mass transit provider. Its modern successor is the state-run Massachusetts Bay Transportation Authority (MBTA), which continues to operate in part on infrastructure developed by BERy and its predecessors.

== History ==
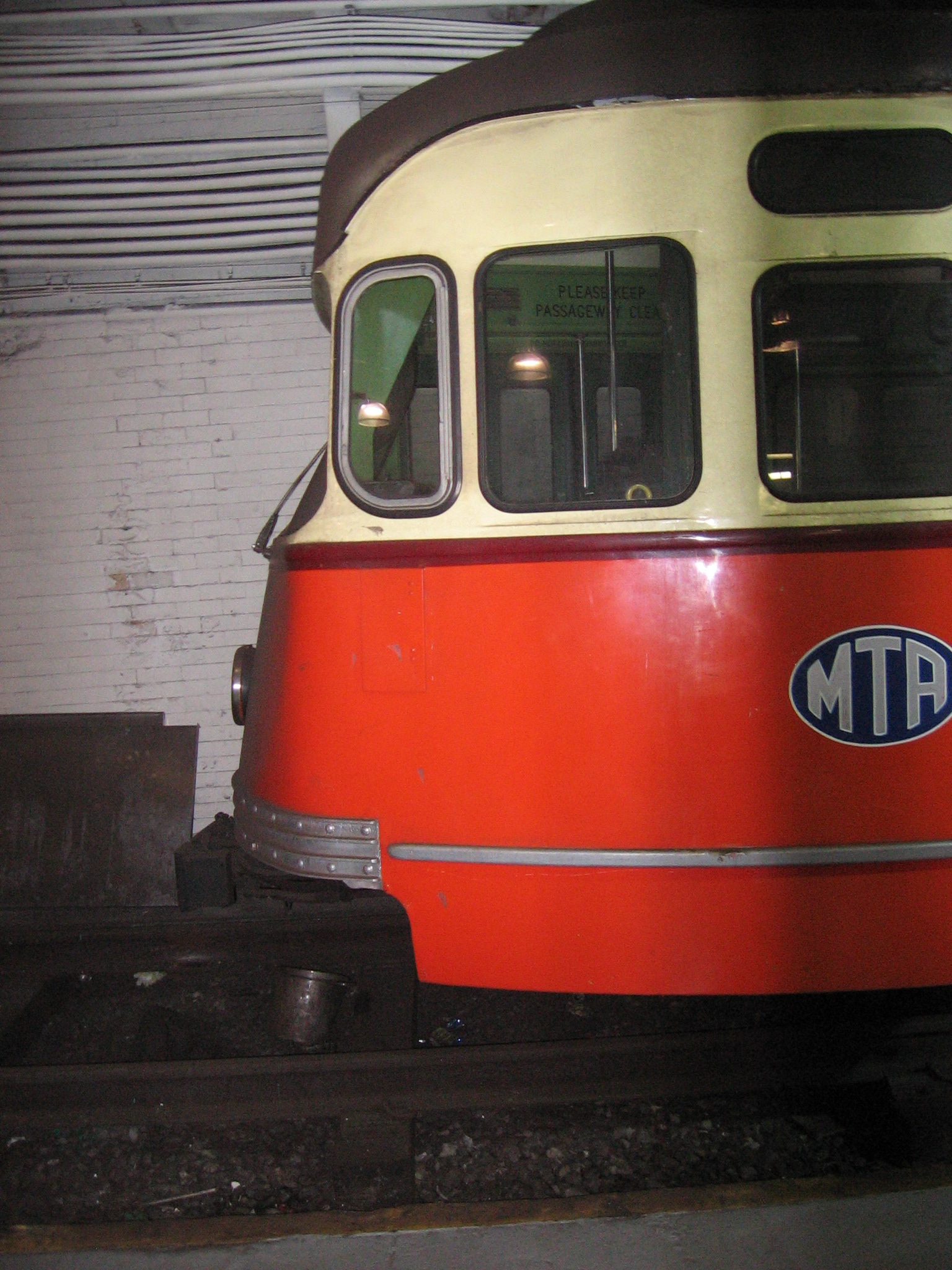
Former MTA PCC car #3295 on display at Boylston

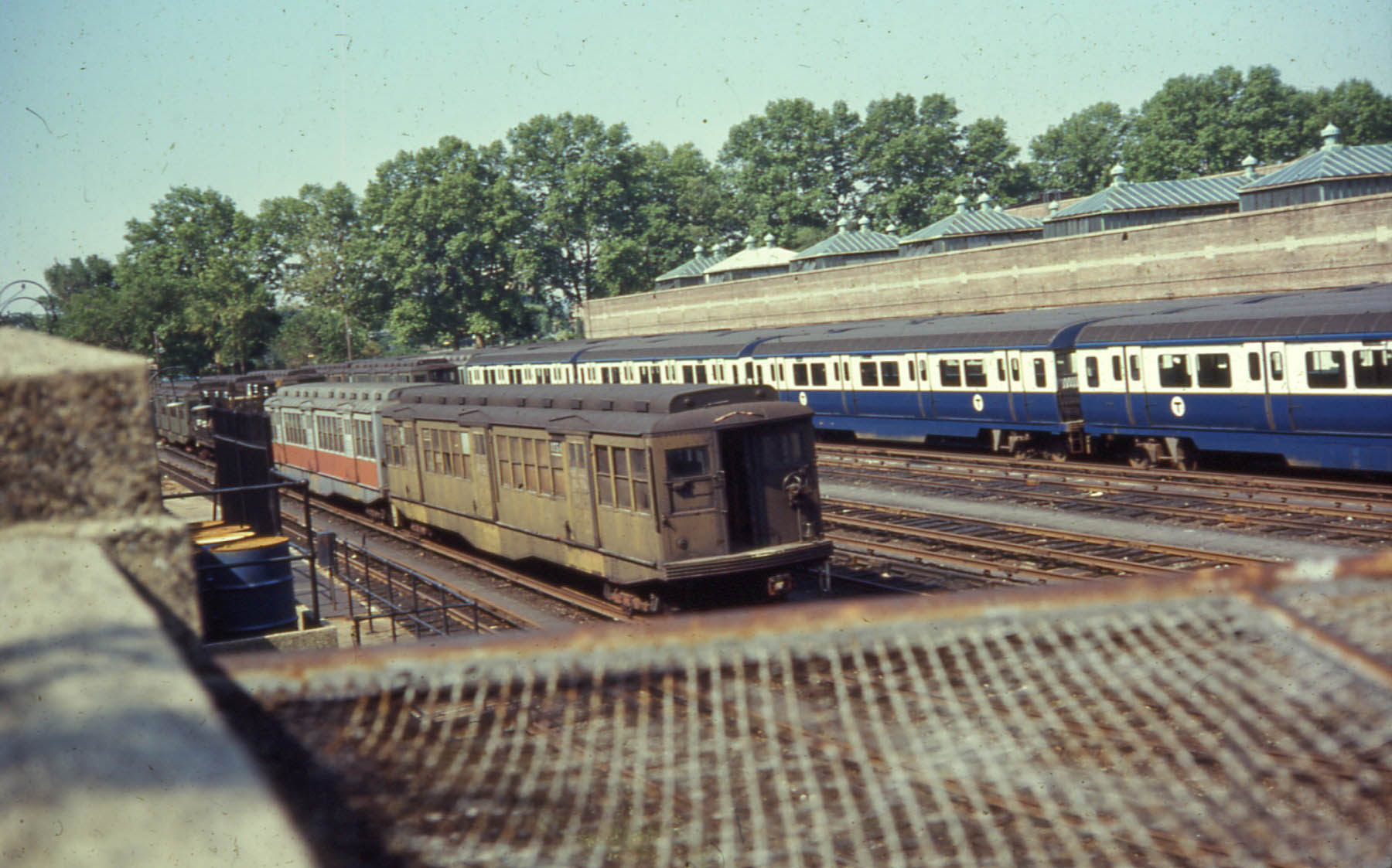
Retired BERy-era heavy rail subway cars (those closest to camera) at the MBTA Red Line's former Eliot Yard, 1967

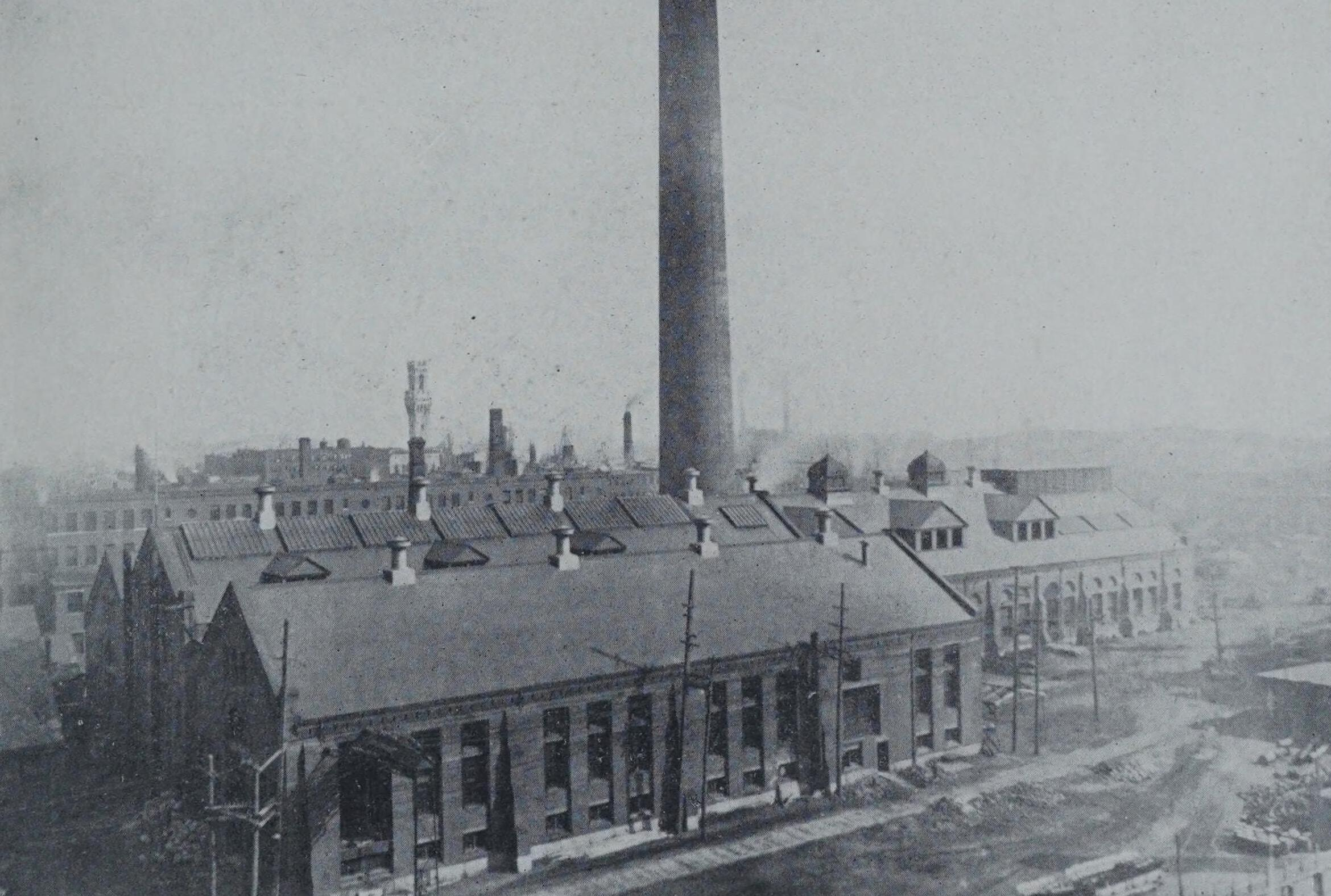
The Central Power Station of the West End Street Railway in the South End, built 1889–91

Originally intended to build a short electric trolley line to Brookline, the West End Street Railway was organized in 1887. By the next year it had consolidated ownership of a number of horse-drawn streetcar lines, composing a fleet of 7,816 horses and 1,480 rail vehicles. As the system grew, a switch to underground pulled-cable propulsion (modeled after the San Francisco cable car system) was contemplated. After visiting Frank Sprague and witnessing the Richmond, Virginia system in action, WESR President Henry Whitney chose to deploy electric propulsion systems. A section of track was used to test the Bentley-Knight underground power line, but this was abandoned because of failures and safety concerns (especially after the electrocution of a team of horses in 1889). After competing in operational tests with the Sprague streetcar system, the Thomson-Houston company was chosen for system-wide deployment of overhead wires. The electrified rapid transit system was named an IEEE Milestone in Electrical Engineering in 2004.

The first electric trolley line built by the West End Street Railway was between Union Square, Allston and Park Square, downtown, via Harvard Street, Beacon Street, Massachusetts Avenue and Boylston Street. Trolleys first ran in 1889. The Green Line A branch later served roughly the same purpose.

The last horse car line was along Marlborough Street in the Back Bay, and was never electrified. It was closed after December 24, 1900.

In the late 19th century, the electric power industry was in its infancy; the power grid as we know it today simply did not exist. The railway company constructed its own power stations; by 1897, these included distributed generation stations in downtown Boston, Allston, Cambridge (near Harvard), Dorchester, Charlestown, East Cambridge, and East Boston. By 1904, the system had 36 megawatts of generating capacity, 421 miles (678 km) of track for over 1,550 street cars (mostly closed but some open), and 16 miles (26 km) of elevated track for 174 elevated cars.

On November 7, 1916, Boston Elevated Railway Company street car No. 393 smashed through the warning gates of the open Summer Street drawbridge in Boston, plunging into the frigid waters of Fort Point Channel, killing 46 people.

The first bus route was in 1922, between Union Square, Allston and Faneuil Street. In 1933 this was merged with the Union Square–Central bus and later became the 64 bus.

=== Elevated railway ===
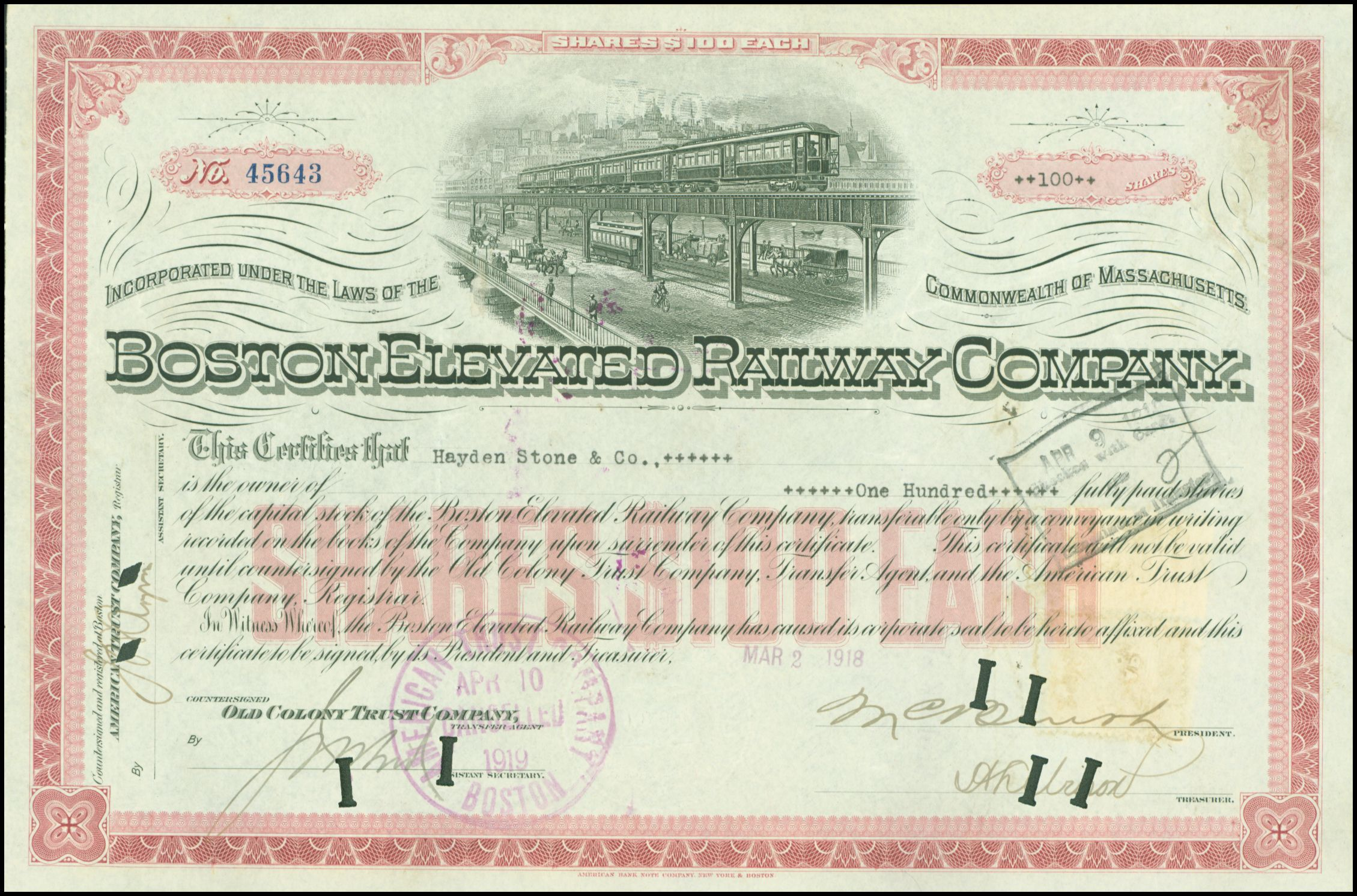
Share of the Boston Elevated Railway Company, issued March 2, 1918

In 1890, the West End Railway was authorized by the state to construct elevated railways, but did not pursue this possibility. The state consequently authorized a new franchise for such an endeavor, which resulted in the founding in 1894 in the establishment of the Boston Elevated Railway. The first stretch of elevated track was put in service in 1901, between Sullivan Square in Charlestown and Dudley Square in Roxbury. Tickets for the elvated line cost 5 cents. In 1909 the elavated line was extended from Dudely Squre to Forest Hills. In 1897, BERy acquired a long-term lease on the West End's lines, and the two companies were formally merged in 1922. The elevated network was expanded to include six end-points, with vehicles run on the tracks in routes designed to allow passengers to reach any destination without changing trains.

=== Power generation ===
The difficulty of transporting coal over land from the Port of Boston and the short range of the direct current system prevented significant expansion inland. In 1911, a large generating station was built in South Boston which produced 25 Hertz alternating current, which could be transmitted long distances at high voltage, to substations which would drop the voltage and convert it to direct current for use by trains. The system was gradually converted until completion in 1931, when 14 substations were in place. This station would operate until 1981, when the MBTA had completed converting all of the active substations to be able to use 60 Hertz alternating current, and could switch to purchasing energy from local utility companies instead of running its own generators.

=== Conversion of routes to trolleybuses and buses ===
The first route of the Boston trackless trolley system was opened by BERy, on April 11, 1936. It was route 77 (later route 69), Harvard to Lechmere via Cambridge Street. Trackless trolleys ran from Harvard station, but only to the west and north, not east to Lechmere after 1963. Trackless trolley service to these routes ended in March of 2022, and they were replaced with temporary diesel buses that are to be replaced with battery electric busses in the spring of 2024.

== Operations ==
The company's rapid transit lines have evolved into the Red, Blue, and Orange Lines. The only streetcars that remain are the various branches of the Green Line and the Mattapan Line; the rest have been converted to buses.

The Boston Elevated Railway operated in the following cities and towns:

- Arlington
- Belmont
- Boston and the municipalities that have been merged into it
- Brookline
- Cambridge
- Chelsea
- Everett
- Malden
- Medford
- Newton (only to get between Boston and Watertown)
- Revere
- Somerville
- Stoneham (only the southern bit, in the Middlesex Fells)
- Watertown

Additionally, streetcars from adjoining towns, run by other companies, operated over Boston Elevated Railway trackage.

Operations of the companies were taken over by the Metropolitan Transit Authority, now the MBTA, in 1947.
