= Harvard station =

Subway station in Cambridge, Massachusetts, US

Harvard
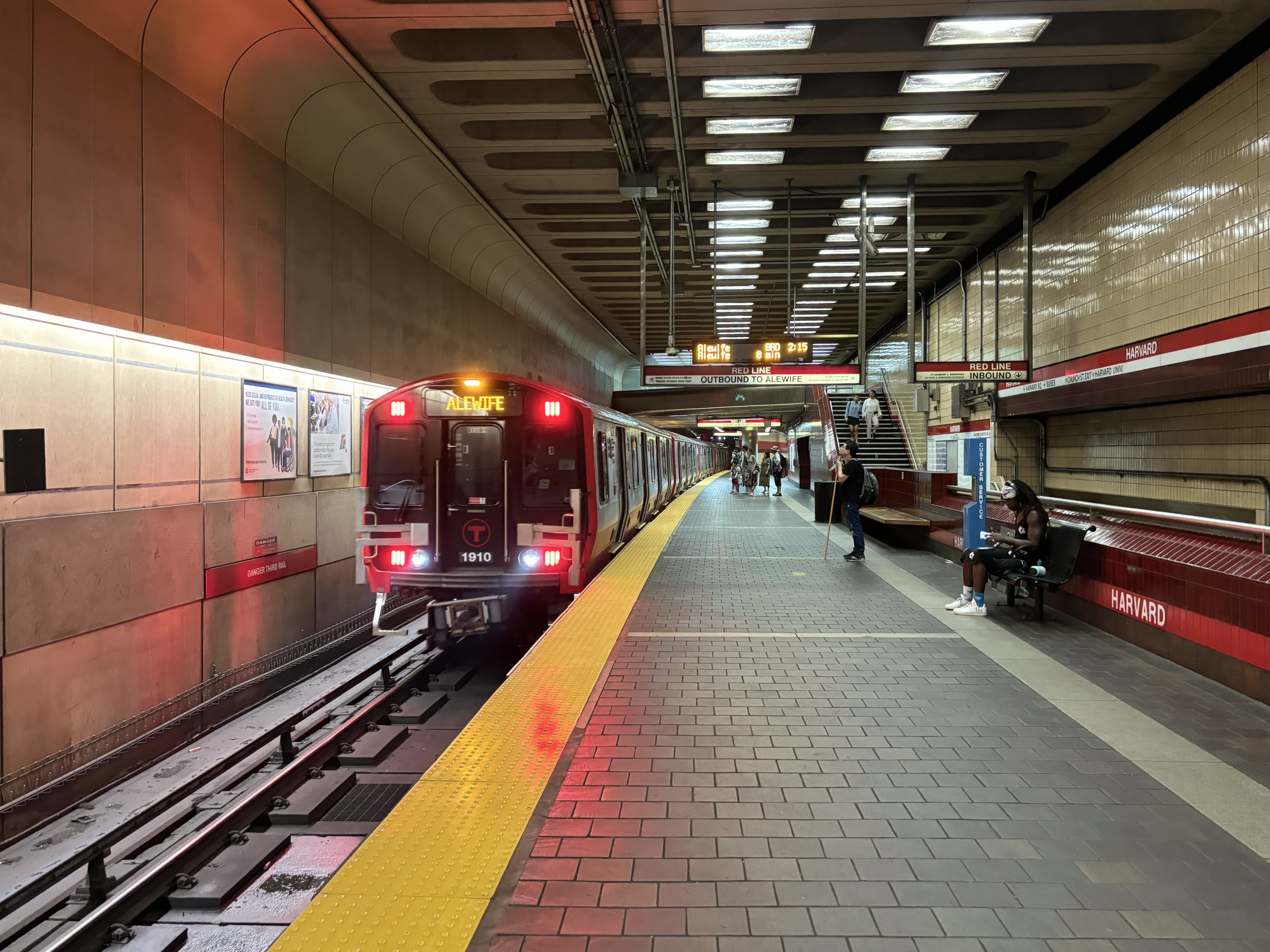
- A northbound train entering Harvard station in June 2024

General information
- Location: Massachusetts Avenue at Harvard Square; Cambridge, Massachusetts
- Coordinates: 42.3735°N 71.1191°W
- Lines: Cambridge Tunnel; Red Line Northwest Extension
- Platforms: 2 split platforms
- Tracks: 2
- Connections: MBTA bus: 1, 66, 68, 69, 71, 73, 74, 75, 77, 78, 86, 96, 109; Watertown Connector shuttles

Construction
- Structure type: Underground
- Cycle facilities: 21 spaces
- Accessible: Yes

History
- Opened: March 23, 1912
- Rebuilt: March 24, 1979–March 2, 1985

Passengers
- FY2019: 18,528 daily boardings

Services
Preceding station	MBTA	Following station
Porter toward Alewife	Red Line	Central toward Ashmont or Braintree
Location

Harvard station is a rapid transit and bus transfer station in Cambridge, Massachusetts. Located at Harvard Square, it serves the MBTA's Red Line subway system as well as MBTA buses. Harvard averaged 18,528 entries each weekday in FY2019, making it the third-busiest MBTA station after Downtown Crossing and South Station.

Harvard station is located directly beneath Harvard Square, a transportation, business, and cultural focal point in Cambridge. The Red Line rail platforms lie underneath Massachusetts Avenue just north of the center of the square. Many connecting surface transit routes are served by the Harvard bus tunnel, which runs on the west side of the station. The primary station entrance leads to a central atrium fare lobby under Harvard Square; there is also a secondary fare lobby for the Red Line toward the north end of the station, with entrances at Church Street and opposite it, near Harvard's Johnston Gate; and an unpaid entrance to the bus tunnel at Brattle Square.

== Station layout ==
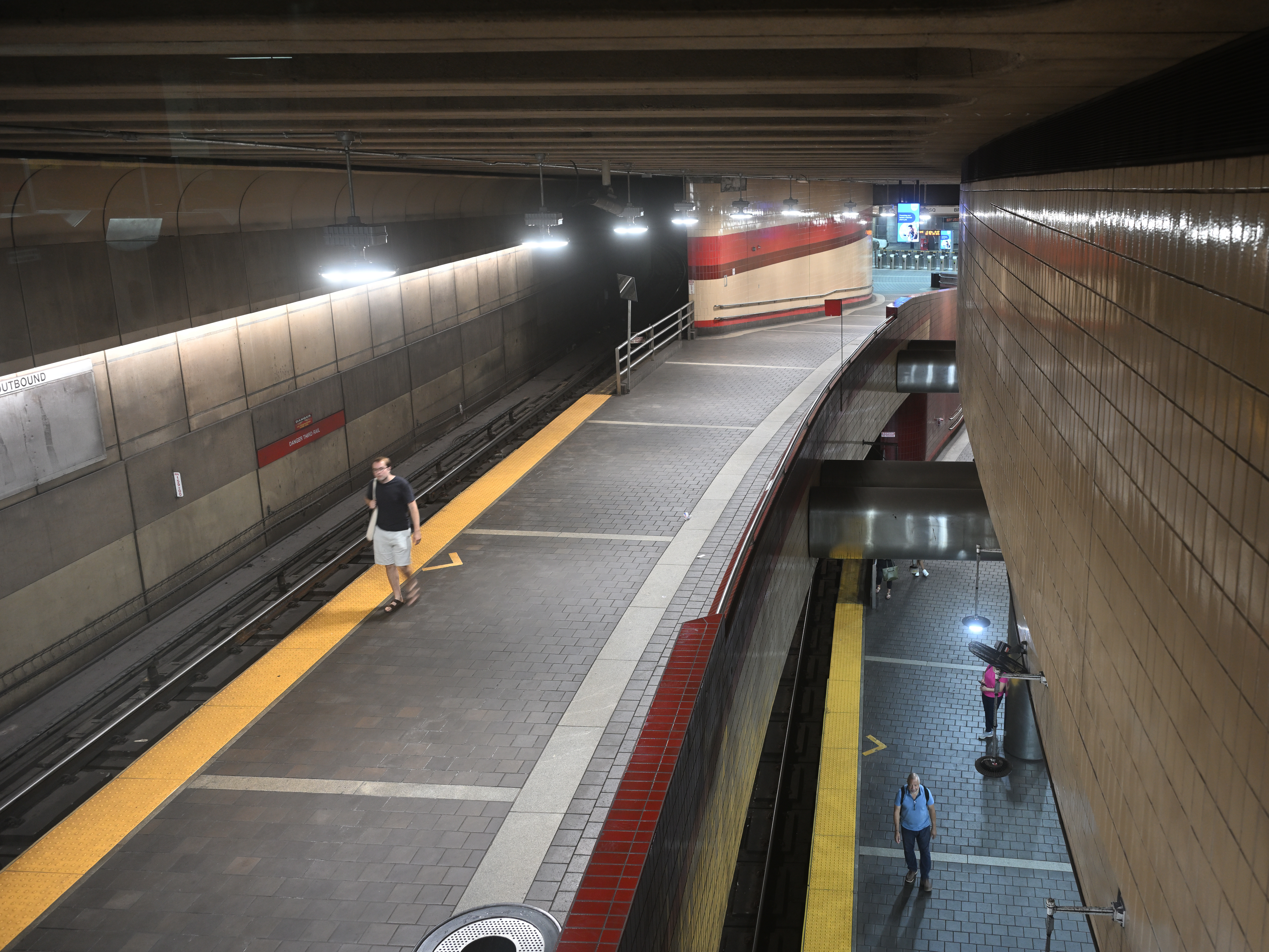
Red Line platforms viewed from the secondary fare mezzanine: the outbound platform is to the left, with the inbound platform visible below to the right.

Harvard station has a complex structure located largely under triangular Harvard Square, from which Massachusetts Avenue runs to the north and east and Brattle Street to the southwest, and under the surrounding streets. The main lobby is located under the square itself, and approximately matches its triangular shape. The glass-and-steel main headhouse is located in a sunken concrete plaza at the south end of the square. The plaza, locally known as "the Pit", plays host to homeless people, street artists, skateboarders, and activists. Passengers descend eastward from the headhouse on a bank of stairs and elevators, then turn and descend northwest on a second escalator bank into the lobby. An elevator is located adjacent to the headhouse; the station is fully accessible.

The Red Line platforms are located on two stacked levels, north of the square under Massachusetts Avenue. The outbound (northbound) track is above and slightly east of the inbound track; both have side platforms on their west sides. These split platforms run from near the south end of Harvard University's Straus Hall to the south part of Flagstaff Park near Garden Street. A pair of ramps lead from the main lobby — which has faregates on its north side — to the platforms. A secondary fare lobby is located above the middle of both platforms, with small brick headhouses on both sides of Massachusetts Avenue at Church Street near Johnston Gate.

=== Bus tunnel ===
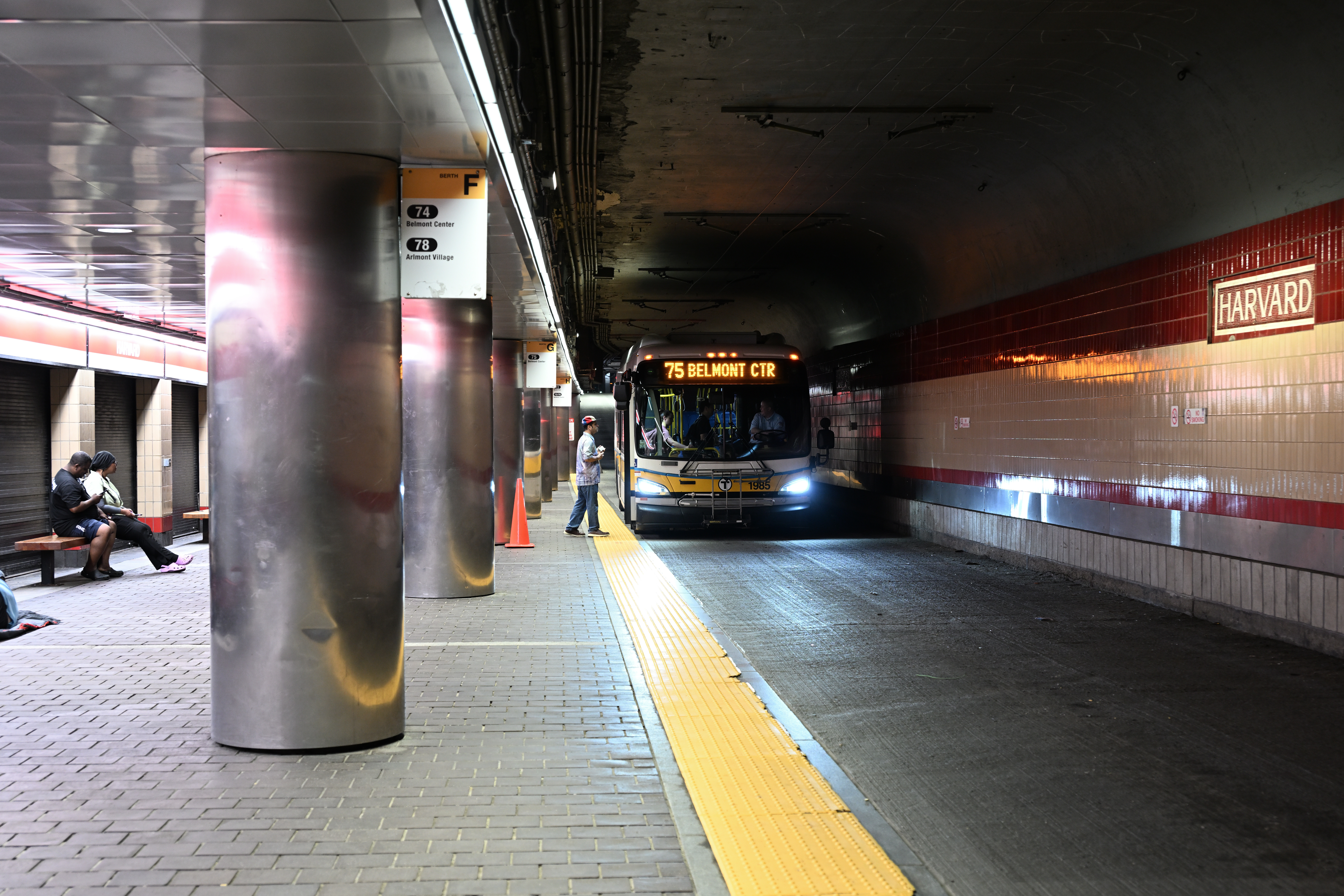
A route 75 bus on the upper level of the bus tunnel

Immediately west of the subway platforms is the 1,380-foot (420 m)-long Harvard bus tunnel, used by MBTA buses and formerly trackless trolleys. Like the Red Line, it is split into two stacked tunnel levels; the northbound level is above and slightly east of the southbound level. Both levels have platforms on their east side, located under Brattle Street southwest of the main lobby. A pair of ramps connect the main station lobby to the platforms; a small set of stairs also connects the lower platform to the west side of the lobby. A headhouse and an elevator to the upper level are located at Eliot Square at the southwest end of the platform.

The south portal of the tunnel is located on Mount Auburn Street; it runs slightly west of Brattle Street to Harvard Square, then northward along the west side of Massachusetts Avenue. The north portal is located inside Flagstaff Park near the south end of Cambridge Common, with an incline to the intersection of Massachusetts Avenue and Cambridge Street. Bennett Alley, a private alley south of Mount Auburn Street, is used for layovers and for northbound buses to access the tunnel from Bennett Street.

The platform is located on the left side for southbound buses (all of which terminate at Harvard). Because buses using the tunnel do not have left-hand doors, passengers must alight next to the wall and cross in front of the bus. MBTA trolleybuses were equipped with an additional left-hand door for boarding on this level; because this door did not have a farebox, passengers instead paid while alighting from routes 71 and 73 (the only routes that boarded southbound in the tunnel).

Harvard is a major transfer point for MBTA bus routes. Ten routes — 66, 71, 73, 74, 75, 77, 78, 86, 96, and 109 — use the Harvard bus tunnel. All board on the upper level; all use the lower level for alighting except the 71 and 73 (which use the upper level for alighting) and the southbound 66, 86, and 109. Six routes – 1, 66, 68, 69, 86, and 109 – stop at street level at several locations in Harvard Square. (Routes 66, 86, and 109 run northbound in the tunnel and southbound on the surface.) Southbound buses on routes 66 and 86, and terminating buses on route 77, also serve a stop on Eliot Street at Bennett Street.

== History ==
=== Original station ===
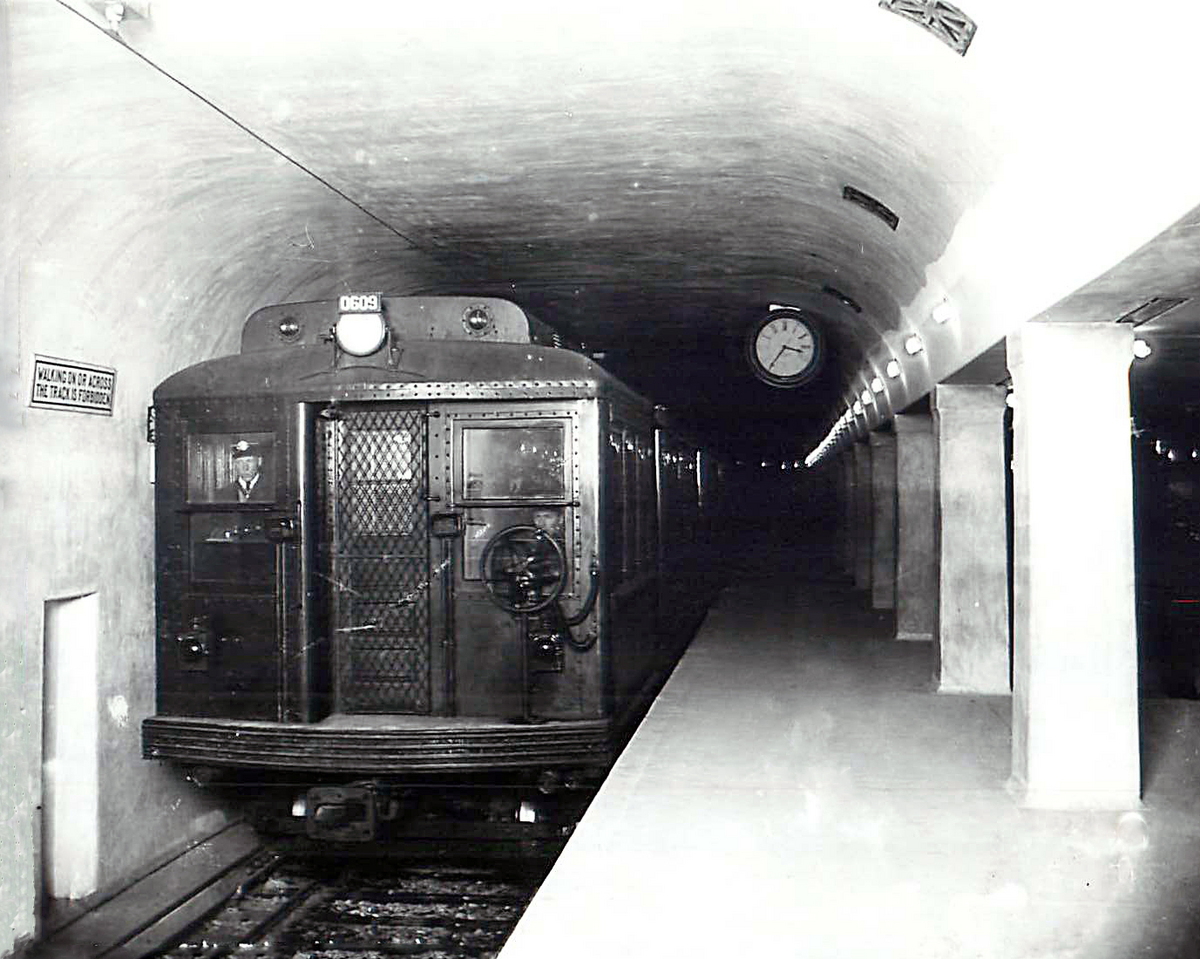
A train at the original Harvard station in 1912

Horse-drawn omnibus service between Harvard Square in Cambridge and downtown Boston began in 1826. The hourly service soon increased to ten-minute headways to meet demand. In late 1849, the Fitchburg Railroad opened the Harvard Branch Railroad, with a Harvard Square station near where Austin Hall is now located. With only six daily round trips, the branch failed to compete with the omnibus service and was closed in 1855. On March 26, 1856, the Cambridge Railroad began horse-drawn tram service between Harvard Square and Bowdoin Square — the first such service in the Boston area. Following the opening of its Beacon Street line earlier that year, the West End Street Railway began electric streetcar service on the North Cambridge–Bowdoin Square line on February 16, 1889. Murray Street Carhouse was built for the new electric cars. The West End (which was acquired by the Boston Elevated Railway in 1897) rapidly expanded its electric operations, including other lines meeting at Harvard Square.

After the success of the 1897-opened Tremont Street Subway, the Boston Elevated Railway (BERy) planned an elevated system with lines to Cambridge, South Boston, Charlestown, and Roxbury. The latter two lines opened in 1901 as the Charlestown Elevated and Washington Street Elevated, while the South Boston line was determined to be infeasible. After debate about running an elevated line above business districts in Cambridge, the BERy agreed in late 1906 to build a line under Beacon Hill in Boston, over a new West Boston Bridge, and under Main Street and Massachusetts Avenue in Cambridge to Harvard Square. Construction began on May 24, 1909. The Cambridge Subway opened from Harvard Square to Park Street Under on March 23, 1912, with intermediate stations at Central Square and Kendall Square.

The two-level underground Harvard Square station largely matched the triangular shape of Harvard Square. The subway platforms were oriented east-west under Massachusetts Avenue at the east end of the station, with the outbound (unloading) platform above and slightly north of the inbound platform. The outbound platform was 283 feet (86 m) long and at least 10–12 feet (3.0–3.7 m) wide; the inbound platform was 320 feet (98 m) long and at least 20 feet (6.1 m) wide to accommodate passengers waiting for trains. West of the platforms, the tracks merged onto a single level, with a pocket track between them. This three-track tunnel ran southwest under Brattle Street to a maintenance facility known as ”Eliot Shops”; outbound trains could reverse direction at the pocket track or continue to the yard.

A two-level streetcar tunnel formed the west part of the station, with platforms 435–472 feet (133–144 m) long. The southbound (lower) level was for streetcars running on Mount Auburn Street, while the northbound level was for streetcars running on Massachusetts Avenue and Garden Street. The streetcar platforms were divided into unloading and loading sections for the through-routed streetcar lines, allowing separation of passenger flows in opposite directions. This philosophy was used throughout the station, with dedicated one-way transfer passages between trains and streetcars in all directions. All passages were level or sloped downwards for ease of movement, and stairs were only necessary for entering or exiting the station at the surface. The platforms and floors were made of granolithic. Station walls were tiled with white enamel, with a red tile band 6 feet (1.8 m) above the floor and white plaster above. The exit to Harvard Yard also had dark granite inside and black marble at the surface.

Early plans called for a monument-like headhouse in Harvard Square matching that of Scollay Square station. However, a one-story, 40-by-60-foot (12 m × 18 m) oval-shaped brick and stone entrance/exit structure was constructed instead. Like the rest of the Cambridge Subway, it was designed by a committee of architects led by Robert Peabody. Additional entrances were located on the south side of Massachusetts Avenue east of Holyoke Street, and inside a BERy waiting room on the south face of the square. Secondary exits were located on the northeast side of the square (later in front of Lehman Hall) and on the north side of Massachusetts Avenue east of the square near the Wadsworth House. The original headhouse was replaced by a smaller structure in 1928. Otherwise, the station was little changed until the 1970s.

=== Streetcar tunnel ===
With an eight-minute running time between Harvard Square and Park Street, the Cambridge Subway was fifteen minutes faster than surface streetcars. No longer needing to run to downtown Boston, lines from the north and west were truncated to Harvard Square. The streetcar tunnel served lines to Watertown, Waverley Square, Belmont, Huron Avenue, and Arlington Heights via North Cambridge. Some lines were through-routed: Arlington Heights with Watertown, and North Cambridge line with Waverley and Belmont; the Huron Avenue line terminated at Bennett Yard. Lines to Lechmere Square, Kendall Square, and Boston continued to use surface tracks in the square. On May 4, 1912, Lexington and Boston Street Railway cars from Lowell began using the tunnel. This lasted until July 8, 1916, when they were cut back to Arlington Heights.

By 1922, 104 streetcars per hour (24 single cars and 40 two-car trains) ran northbound through the tunnel during the afternoon peak. In response to overcrowding, the BERy extended the loading section of the northbound platform from 250 feet (76 m) to 400 feet (120 m) and widened the existing portion, doubling its area. Construction work started in late 1922 and was finished in 1923. At that time, the BERy believed that Harvard would be the permanent terminus; the heavy ridership from the north was expected to be handled by extending rapid transit from Lechmere Square.

Bus routes added in the 1920s and 1930s (including the 1925 conversion of the Harvard-Kendall line) originally stopped on the surface. Trackless trolleys (trolleybuses) began to use the tunnel with the conversion of the Huron Avenue streetcar line (now route 72) on April 2, 1938. (The Harvard–Lechmere line — now route 69 — was converted in 1936, but it continued to run on the surface because of road geometry. Not until spring 1956 were wires reconfigured to allow the line to use the tunnel.) The busy Arlington Heights line (now route 77) was converted to surface-stopping diesel buses on November 19, 1955.

In the late 1950s, the MTA (which had replaced the BERy in 1947) needed additional streetcars to run the new Riverside Line (which opened in 1959), but no domestic manufacturers were still producing PCC streetcars. The City of Cambridge also planned road work that would interrupt streetcar service, and wished to eliminate "safety islands" (where passengers boarded streetcars) from Massachusetts Avenue. The MTA replaced Arborway-based trolleybus lines with diesel buses, then transferred the trolleybuses to replace the Harvard-based streetcars. Some off-peak and Sunday service was replaced in 1956, followed by Cushing Square short turn service in 1957. On September 5, 1958, the Watertown (71) and Waverley (73) lines and the North Cambridge short turns (now route 77A) were replaced with trolleybuses, ending streetcar service through the tunnel.

The four trolleybus routes (sometimes considered three, as most trips on the 71 and 73 were through-routed with North Cambridge trips) continued to use the tunnel. As of 2006, it was one of only two urban trolleybus subways (tunnels with stations) in the world, following the end of trolleybus service in the Downtown Seattle Transit Tunnel in 2005; the other was the South Boston Transitway. (The 2,160-foot-long (660 m) College Hill Tunnel, in Providence, Rhode Island, was used by trackless trolleys from 1948 to 1953, but had no stations. The use of the Essen premetro subway in Germany by trolleybuses ended in 1995, and the Kanden Tunnel and Tateyama Tunnel in Japan were non-urban trolleybus tunnels.)

On March 30, 1963, the MTA replaced all remaining trolleybus routes except for the Harvard-based routes with diesel buses. The Harvard tunnel was closed on Sundays, with trolleybuses replaced by diesel buses operating on the surface. Original plans had called for the trolleybuses to be replaced by diesel buses at all times, but this was delayed while the MTA investigated methods to ventilate the tunnel. Diesel buses equipped with early catalytic mufflers were tested from 1962 to 1964, with the hope of eliminating most surface bus traffic from Harvard Square. In January 1965, catalytic-muffler-equipped diesel buses on route 77 began using the tunnel, followed by route 96 in March 1966. However, the trolleybus lines were not replaced with diesel buses until 2022. In August 2024, northbound route 66 buses began using the tunnel.

=== Maintenance facilities ===
The BERy constructed a pair of rail yards on a site to the southwest of Harvard Square, bordered by Eliot Street, Bennett Street, University Road, Charles River Road, and Boylston Street. Much of the site was occupied by BERy and West End Street Railway streetcar barns; the area had been used for horsecar facilities since at least 1871. The rest of the site, which had once been marshland, was occupied by private buildings. The west half of the site was occupied by Bennett Street Yard, a storage and maintenance facility for streetcars. It included a 16-track, 375-by-270-foot (114 m × 82 m) carhouse that could hold 92 streetcars, plus an open-air storage yard. Bennett opened on March 30, 1911, replacing nearby Boylston Street and Murray Street carhouses.

The eastern half of the site housed the Eliot Square Shops, used for storage and maintenance of the Cambridge Subway rolling stock. It had a three-track machine shop and five covered maintenance tracks, plus open-air storage tracks. The whole facility covered 625 by 335 feet (191 m × 102 m), including the 500-by-140-foot (152 m × 43 m) shop building and the 150-foot (46 m)-wide yard. Footings were built between the yard tracks to allow for future air rights development. On the west side of the shop building, a single track ran up a ramp to Bennett Yard. Nicknamed "Bancroft Hall" (after BERy president William Bancroft) by employees, the shop building was used to assemble the forty new subway cars. Eliot Square Shops cost $1.00 million (equivalent to $23.45 million in 2024) out of the total $11.75 million cost of the Cambridge Subway.

On the east side of the yard, the BERy constructed a 350-by-15-foot (106.7 m × 4.6 m) concrete platform for special service to events such as the Harvard football games at Harvard Stadium. Known as Stadium station, it had a main ramp entrance/exit at the south end, plus eight smaller stair entrance/exits along the east wall. It was not open for regular use and did not have turnstiles; instead, employees collected all fares. Fully staffing the station took 49 employees, including 24 ticket sellers and 12 ticket choppers. Stadium station could handle 26,000 passengers in 45 minutes after a game, with trains running every 1 3/4 minutes. The architecture of the station was designed by Robert S. Peabody. It first opened for a home game versus Brown on October 26, 1912; the last known use was on November 18, 1967, for the final home game of the 1967 Harvard football season.

BERy also constructed a brick division headquarters building, later known as the Conductor's Building, in Bennett Alley between the yard and the streetcar tunnel. It was used by the BERy and its successors until around 2000; in 2014–2016, the building was renovated for use as a restaurant. It is the last remaining aboveground building from the 1912 construction of the Cambridge tunnel. The Harvard Square power station, which was built for streetcars in 1897, was located adjacent to Eliot Shops across Boylston Street. It had a substantial coal trestle for freight streetcars to deliver coal. A steam tunnel ran west from the power station under Eliot and Bennett yards, supplying steam power to both. After Widener Library was built in 1912, Harvard University built a steam tunnel to Harvard Yard and used excess steam to heat the new library and other buildings. The power station was largely unused by the time it was sold to the university in 1929. Harvard demolished the structure in 1930 in favor of purchasing steam from a Cambridge Electric Light Company plant. Eliot House opened on the site in 1931.

In April 1924, the BERy converted the East Boston Tunnel (later the Blue Line) from streetcars to high-platform metro rolling stock. A small maintenance facility was built underground near Maverick station, but more extensive work was performed at Eliot Shops. Cars were brought to the surface at a portal west of Bowdoin station, towed on surface tracks on Cambridge Street and the Longfellow Bridge, and transferred onto the Cambridge–Dorchester line tracks at a gate near the west end of the bridge. This was done until April 25, 1952, when the new maintenance facility at Orient Heights eliminated the need for the transfer. Beginning in 1956, Ashmont–Mattapan High-Speed Line streetcars were towed to Eliot Shops behind Cambridge–Dorchester line trains after the abandonment of surface lines severed the connection to Arborway Yard. This continued until a maintenance facility was built at Mattapan in 1971.

The BERy purchased a private garage adjacent to Bennett Yard in October 1931; it was reopened on July 28, 1932, as a garage for BERY maintenance trucks. Pavement was laid around several tracks in Bennett Yard in 1936 and 1938 for use by trolleybuses. Several yard tracks were removed in 1942 and 1949, the latter to accommodate trolleybuses for the conversion of the Harvard–Massachusetts line. Until it was reassigned to Reservoir Carhouse in 1940, the Lake Street line had been based out of Bennett Street, requiring a long deadhead move along Cambridge Street to Lechmere. After the last Bennett-based streetcar lines were replaced with trolleybuses in 1958, the facility was used solely by trolleybuses and diesel buses. All trolleybus maintenance was performed at Bennett, though some were also stored at North Cambridge Carhouse. In October 1958, the MTA sold the east part of Bennett Yard to the city of Cambridge, which used the paved area as public parking.

Around 1963, John F. Kennedy originally proposed to build his presidential library near Harvard, on the south side of the Charles River. In June 1964, then-city councilman Alfred Vellucci proposed to instead locate the library on the site of the Bennett and Eliot railyards, on the northern side of the river. The MTA had begun offering this site for sale the previous year, with Harvard University and several real estate developers developing bids, as the agency planned for a replacement maintenance facility either near South Station or as part of the planned northwestern Red Line extension. Shortly after being selected as architect in December 1964, I.M. Pei indicated an interest in the yard site, and it was chosen over a smaller southern site in mid-1965. In January 1966, governor John A. Volpe signed a bill allowing the state to purchase the yards from the now-renamed MBTA, and in turn to give the site to the federal government for the library. The sale took place on February 15, 1968, though the MBTA had not yet finalized plans for a replacement. Plans to replace the Mattapan Line with a Red Line extension and build the new yard at Mattapan station fell were cancelled in 1969 due to local opposition.

The MBTA ultimately purchased land near South Station for its new Red Line maintenance facility in December 1969. Cabot Yard opened in June 1974, freeing the Eliot Shops site for development. However, community opinion had by then turned against placing the library in Harvard Square because of concerns about traffic and crowding; in November 1975, the Kennedy Library Corporation voted to instead place the library at Columbia Point near UMass Boston. Eliot Shops closed in 1976, with demolition beginning on December 22. Bennett Yard closed on March 22, 1980, replaced by new maintenance facilities at North Cambridge and Watertown Yard.

In October 1978, the first building of a new John F. Kennedy School of Government complex opened on the southern half of the site. The new buildings were constructed on fill atop the concrete base of the yard. A single segment of wall reading BOSTON ELEVATED RAILWAY CO. 1911 remained in the courtyard of the Kennedy School until a 2015-17 expansion project. The abandoned tunnel to Eliot Shops under Brattle Street is still extant and used for MBTA storage.

=== Former stations ===
Simplified map of the current and former stations

There have been a total of five stations on the Red Line in and around Harvard Square. The original Harvard station was located just east of the current station, and some remains exist. The original station closed permanently on January 30, 1981. The surviving eastern end of the original outbound side platform, built to accommodate passengers alighting at the former terminus, is still visible from passing trains.

The 1945 Coolidge Commission report — the first major transit planning initiative in the region since 1926 — recommended an extension from Harvard to Arlington Heights via East Watertown. The 1947 revision recommended an extension north to Porter Square instead, with branches along the Fitchburg Railroad to Waltham and the Lexington Branch to Lexington. The 1966 Program for Mass Transportation by the 1964-created MBTA called for an immediate extension to Alewife Brook Parkway via Porter Square, with possible future extensions to Arlington or Waltham.

During the construction of the current Harvard station, two temporary stations were built. "Harvard/Brattle", a temporary station built of pressure-treated wood, consisted of two island platforms between three tracks in Eliot Yard, just outside the portal. A $1.4 million construction contract was approved on December 7, 1977, with a groundbreaking ceremony on January 23, 1978. The station was open from March 24, 1979, to September 1, 1983, and was the northern terminus of the Red Line during that period. The temporary station was completely demolished, and parts of the Kennedy School of Government now occupy the space.

"Harvard/Holyoke" station was located in the main Red Line tunnel east of the current station, at Massachusetts Avenue and Holyoke Street. It was open from January 31, 1981, to September 1, 1983.

=== Current station ===
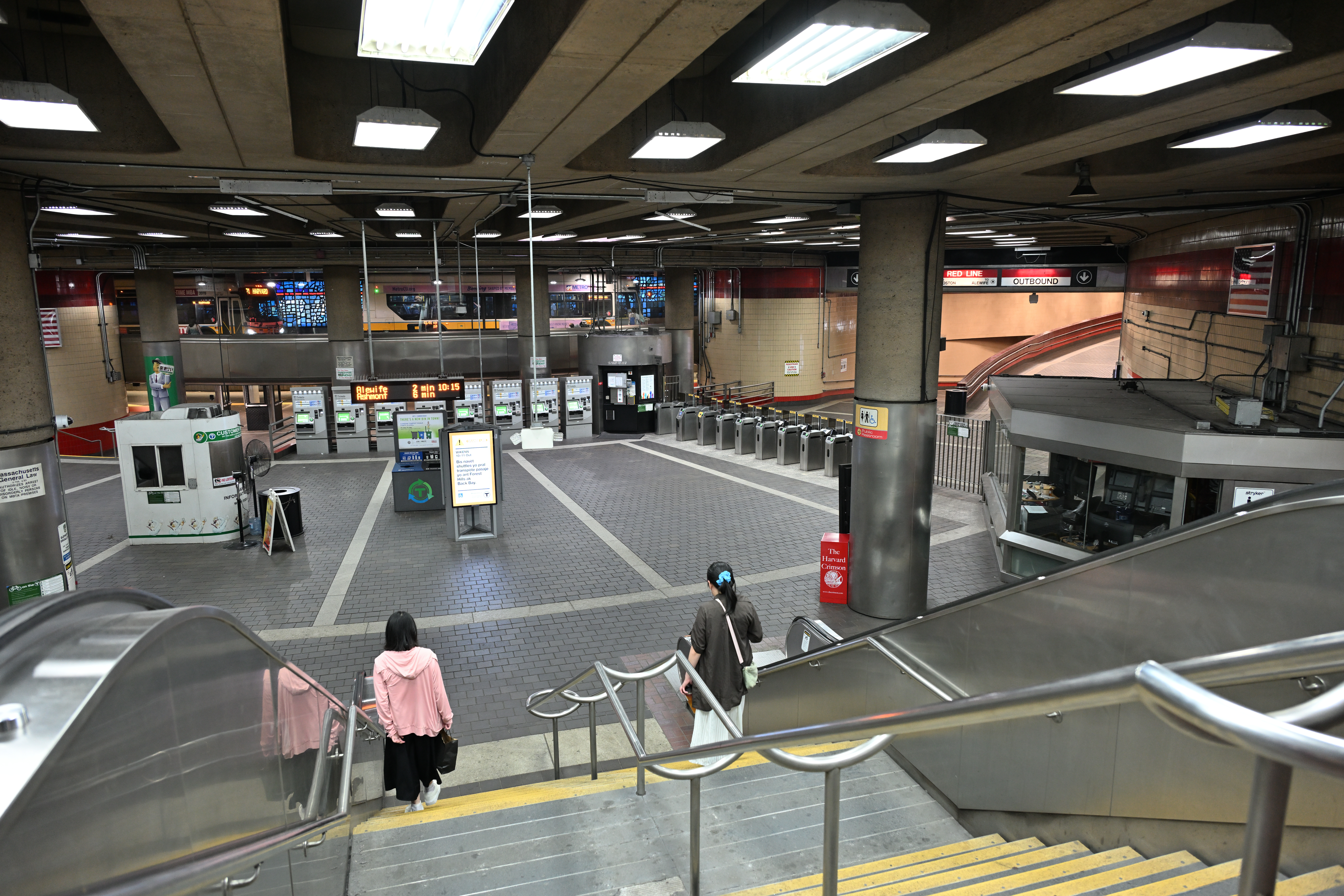
The fare mezzanine of the modern station

The Church Street secondary entrance to the new station opened on September 6, 1983. The main lobby and the new Harvard Square headhouse opened on March 2, 1985.

The reconstructed former headhouse was returned to the square and occupied by Out of Town News in 1984.) Since its reopening, the Harvard Square Subway Kiosk has been occupied by several different news retailers, until it was rededicated as a public information and art gallery space.

The artworks at Harvard and the three new stations were dedicated on May 3, 1985.

The renovated busway opened on September 7, 1985, completing the $72 million construction project. The bus platforms had been moved to the south (occupying part of the former tunnel to Eliot Square Shops) and renovated during the six-year closure of the tunnel. The northern ramp of the tunnel was also rebuilt during the closure. In addition to the route previously using the tunnel, bus routes 74, 75, and 78 were rerouted into the tunnel. (Route 86, which remained on the surface, began using the tunnel northbound only in 2008.) A memorial plaque honoring John H. "Muggsie" Kelly, a construction foreman who was killed by a crane collapse during construction in May 1982, was dedicated in October 1985. The One Brattle Square shopping complex, opened in 1992, was constructed partially on air rights over the south end of the bus tunnel.

Harvard Square was planned to be the terminus of a spur of the Urban Ring Project, a circumferential bus rapid transit line. Under draft plans released in 2008, northbound buses would have crossed the Anderson Memorial Bridge and entered the bus tunnel via Eliot Street, Bennett Street, and Bennett Alley. Southbound buses would have started at the Dawes Island bus stop, then proceeded on the surface on Eliot Street and JFK Street back to the bridge. The project was cancelled in 2010 due to high cost.

The MBTA agreed to build a new elevator at the south end of the upper busway at Eliot Square, and to replace the Harvard Square elevator, as part of the 2006 settlement of Joanne Daniels-Finegold, et al. v. MBTA. Construction of the Eliot Square elevator began in mid-2010. The $4.1 million project, which provided redundant elevator access to the station, was completed in January 2012. The main elevator in Harvard Square was closed in 2018 for an 18-month replacement with a larger glass elevator. The new elevator, which has copper sheeting on the kiosk, opened on October 31, 2019.

A project to make repairs to the deteriorated pavement, replace the trolleybus wire, replace lighting, improve wayfinding, and add automatic doors to the main station took place in 2019 and 2020. On June 23, 2019, the upper busway was temporarily closed; most buses used the lower busway for boarding and surface stops for alighting, while routes 71 and 73 ran on the surface only. The upper busway reopened and the lower busway closed on October 21. The lower busway reopened on November 22, with the upper busway again closed until December 21. Additional closures of the lower busway took place from March 31 to May 2 and June 21 to December 21, 2020, as decreased ridership during the coronavirus pandemic allowed for faster construction. The upper busway was again closed from June 20 to July 29, 2021, with the lower busway then closed until August 29. Trolleybus service ended on March 13, 2022, with routes 71 and 73 rerouted to board in the upper busway.

Harvard was one of the ten high-ridership subway stations planned to receive new wayfinding signage, lighting, and other station improvements in 2019. Six of the stations were completed in 2019 and 2020, and designs were completed for Harvard and three others. Construction began at Harvard in early 2020, but was suspended due to the COVID-19 pandemic and was not resumed due to a lack of available funding.

== Public artwork ==
As a part of the Red Line Northwest Extension, Harvard was included as one of the stations involved in the pioneering Arts on the Line program. Arts on the Line was devised to bring art into the MBTA's subway stations in the late 1970s and early 1980s. It was the first program of its kind in the United States and became the model for similar arrangements to fund public art across the country.

Four of the original twenty artworks were located at Harvard station. The first two are located within the station interior, while the remaining two were located outdoors:

- Blue Sky on the Red Line by György Kepes — A large stained-glass wall composed of mostly cobalt blue glass, with the exception of a red band that runs the length of the work. It is mounted on the wall of the upper Harvard bus tunnel so that it is visible from the central atrium space of the station. The work was no longer lit by 1995 because the original light fixtures had expired. It required $40,000 of repairs in 1998. The backlighting for the artwork, which had not been functional for years, was restored in December 2019.
- New England Decorative Art by Joyce Kozloff — An 83-foot (25 m) long mosaic split up into 8 sections, each resembling a quilt.
- Gateway to Knowledge by Anne Norton — A 20-foot (6.1 m) high brick structure divided vertically down the center by a gap, but still attached at the top. One half is slightly forward of the other (located in Brattle Square).
- Omphalos by Dimitri Hadzi — A freestanding grouping of pillars made up of various shapes that intersect at odd angles using many different types and polishes of granite. Previously located just north of the Harvard Square Subway Kiosk (which is also north of the main station entrance), the sculpture was removed in 2013 due to deterioration, with plans to refurbish and relocate it elsewhere.

== Gallery ==
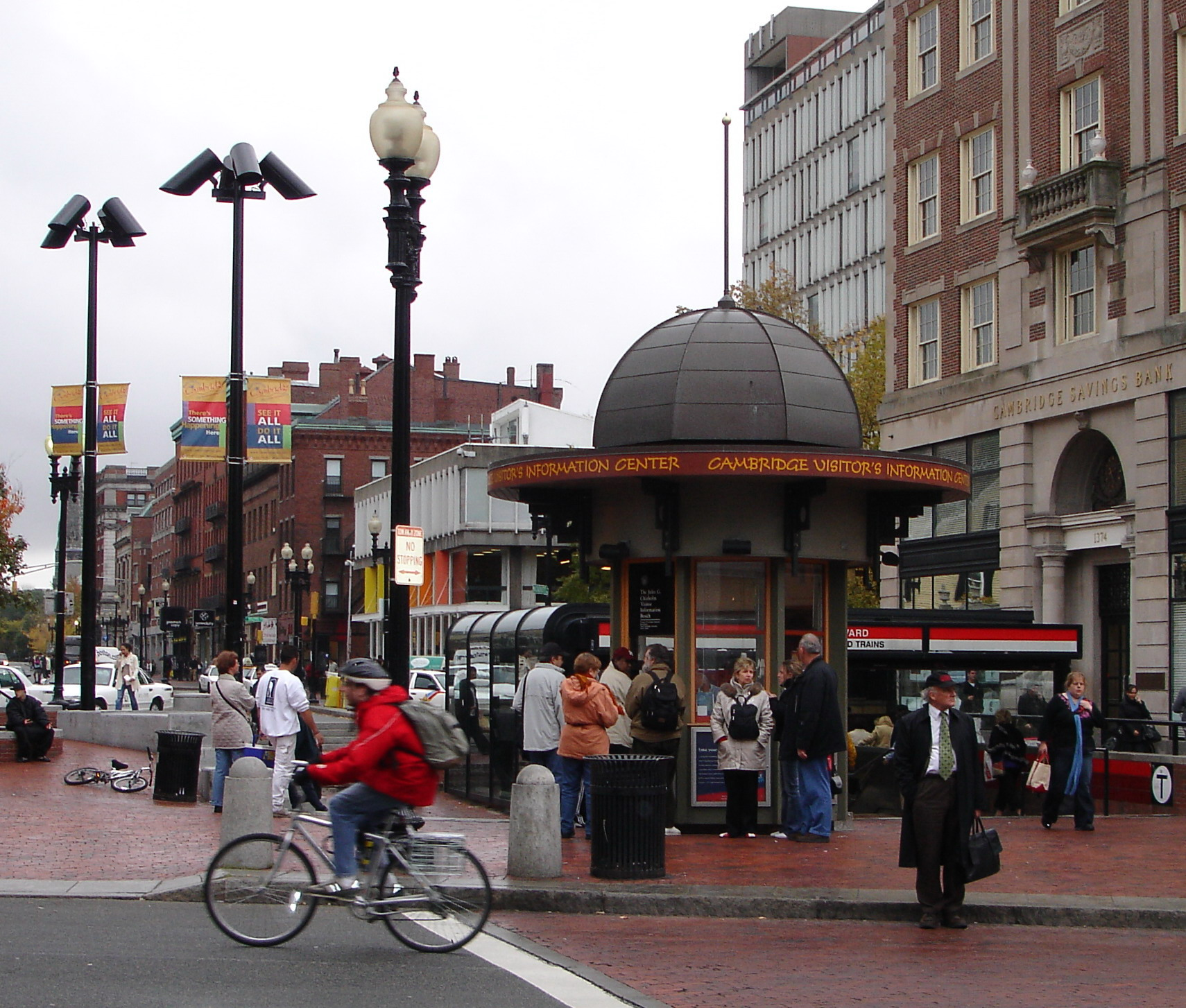
A Cambridge Visitor's Information Center was installed next to the main entrance to the station

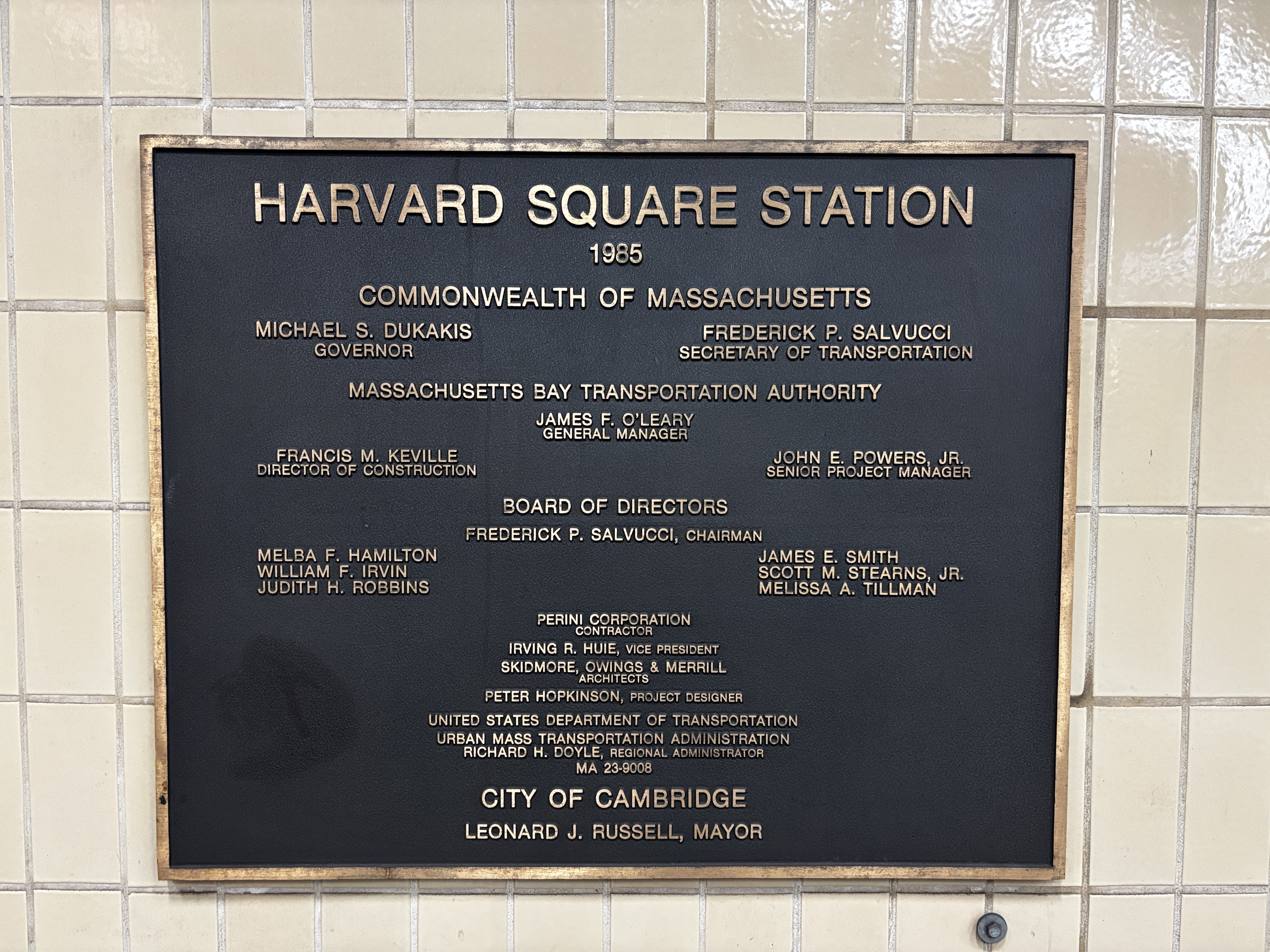
1985 dedication plaque for the new station, which had opened in 1983

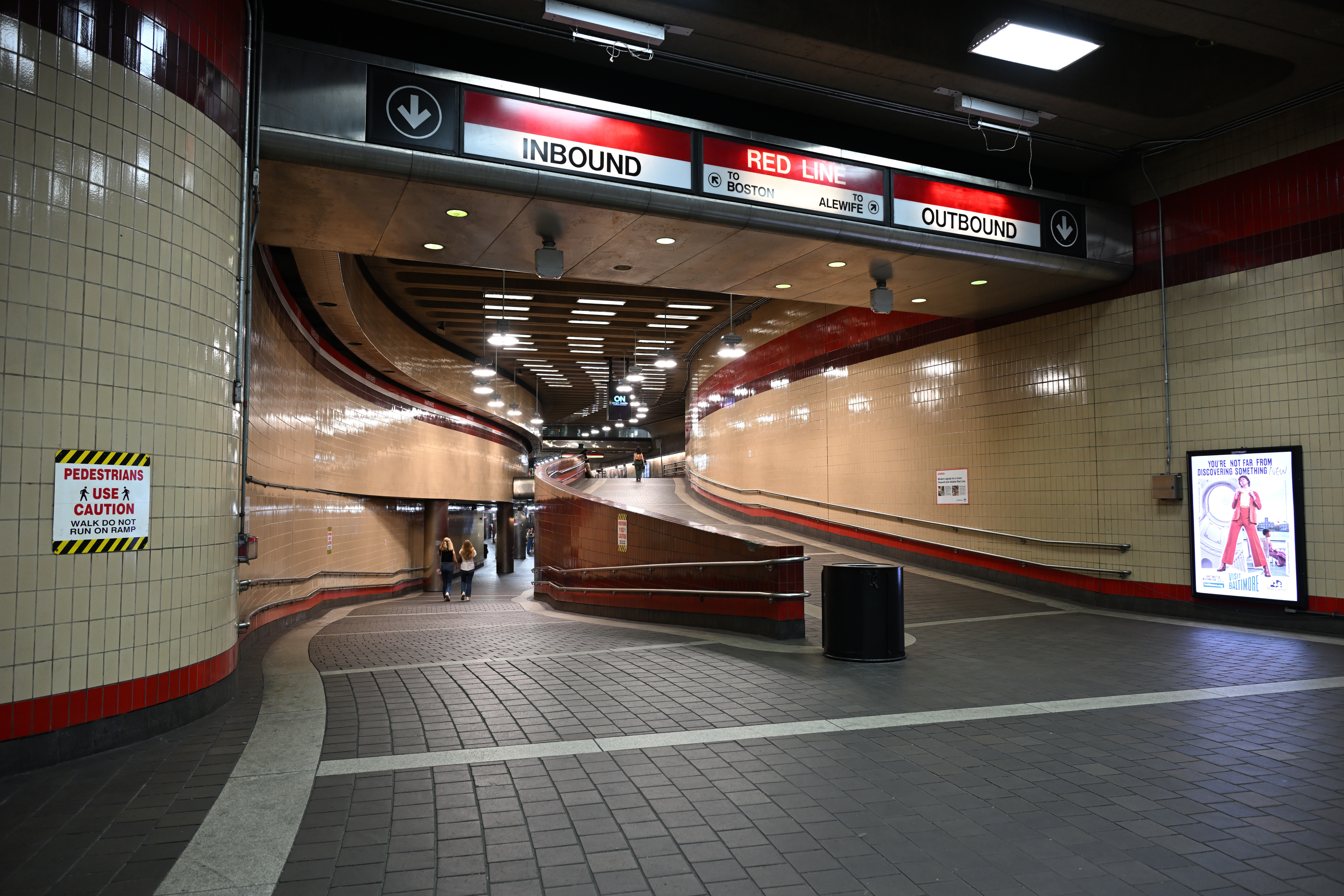
View looking northward from station atrium lobby, with outbound platform above inbound platform

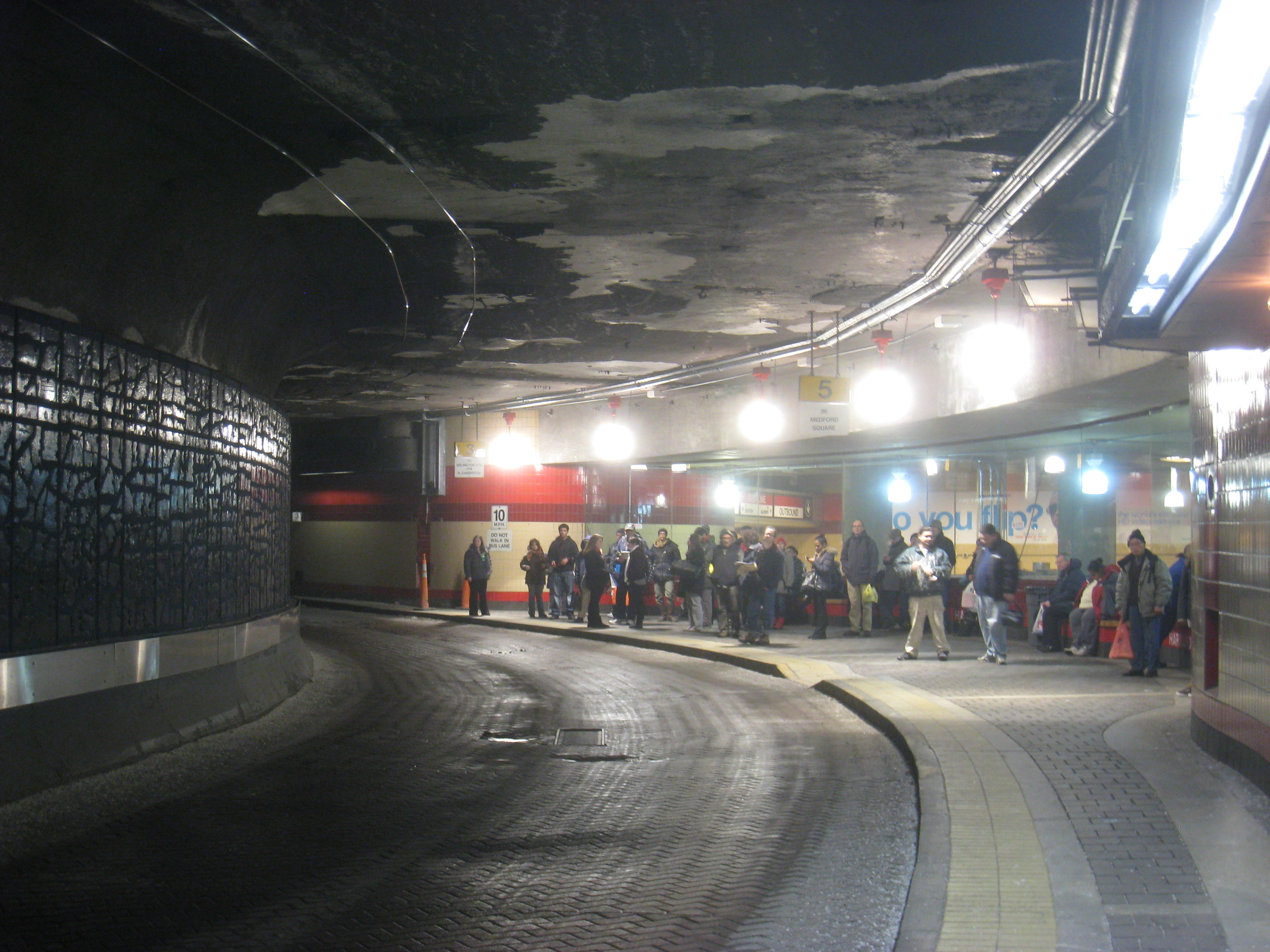
Passengers waiting in Harvard bus tunnel, upper level. Central atrium is visible though windows at rear.

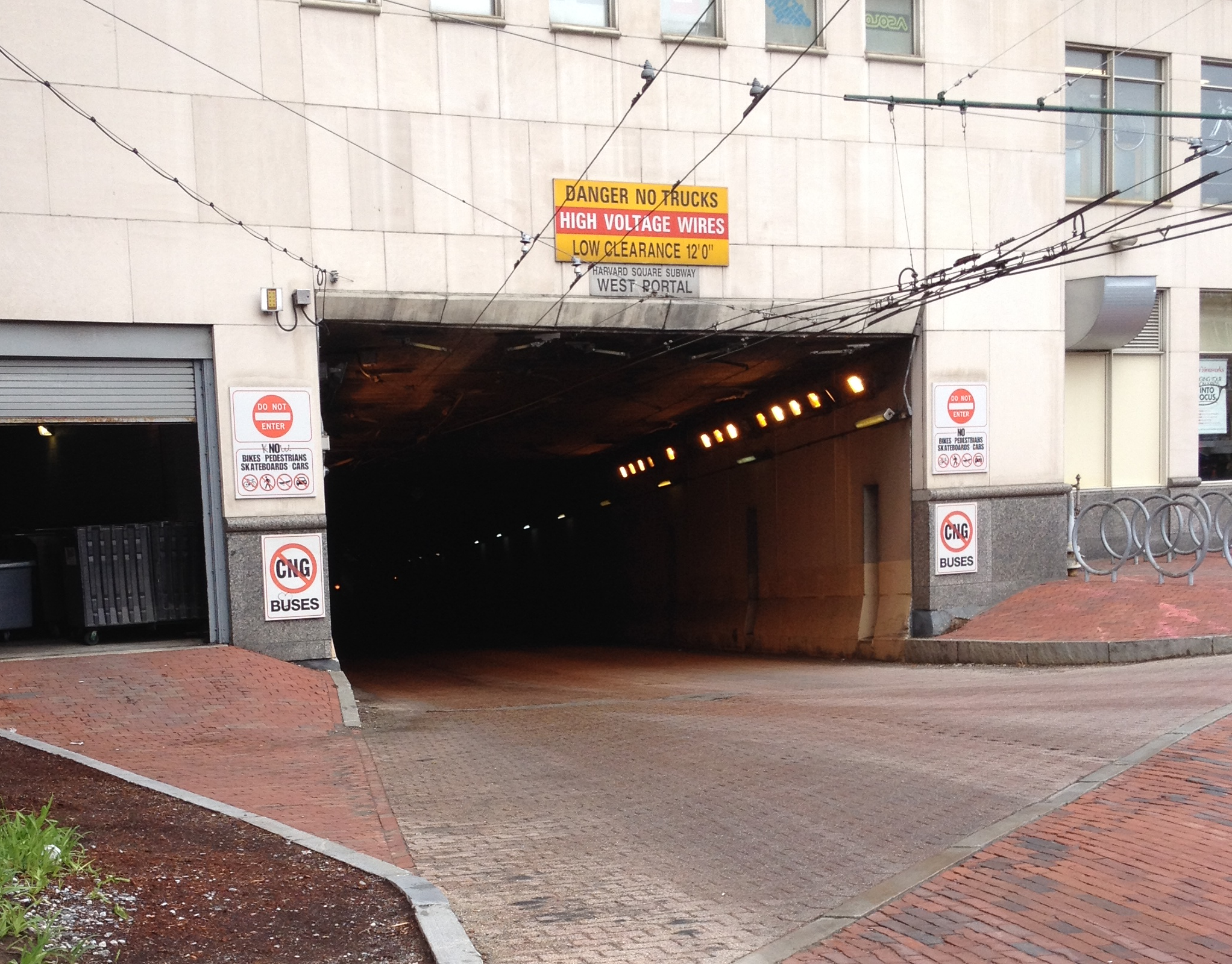
Western portal of the Harvard bus tunnel connects to Mount Auburn Street (behind camera viewpoint)

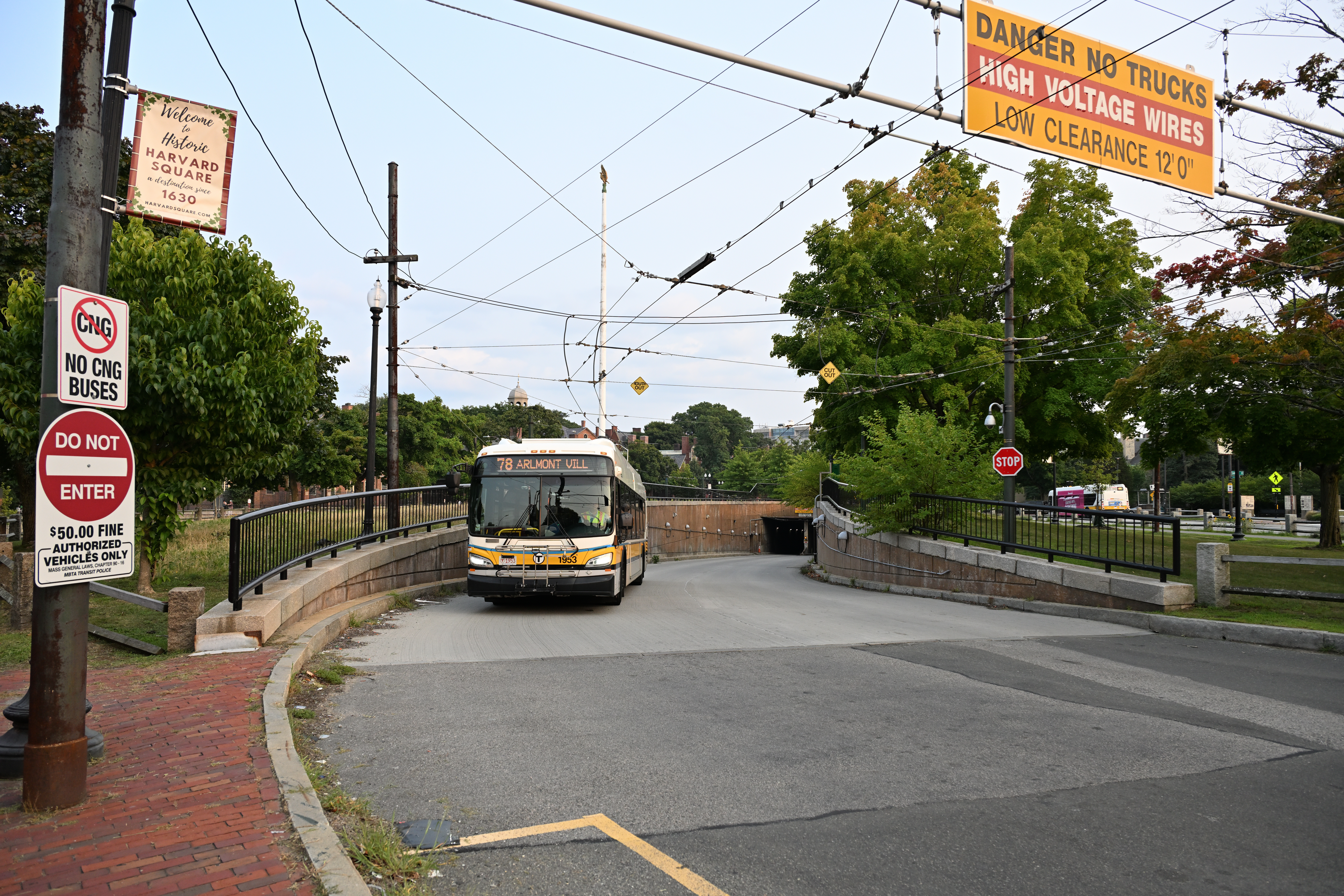
Eastern portal of the Harvard bus tunnel connects to Massachusetts Avenue (also behind camera viewpoint).

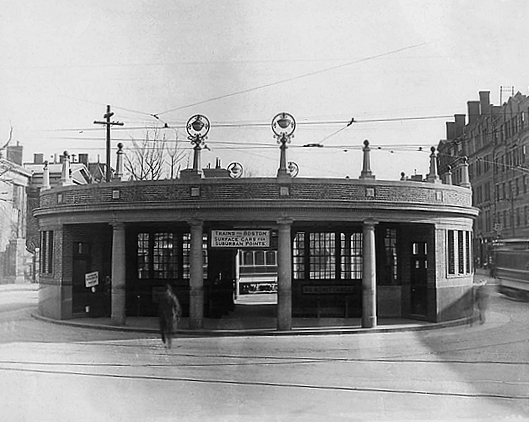
Original station headhouse of 1912

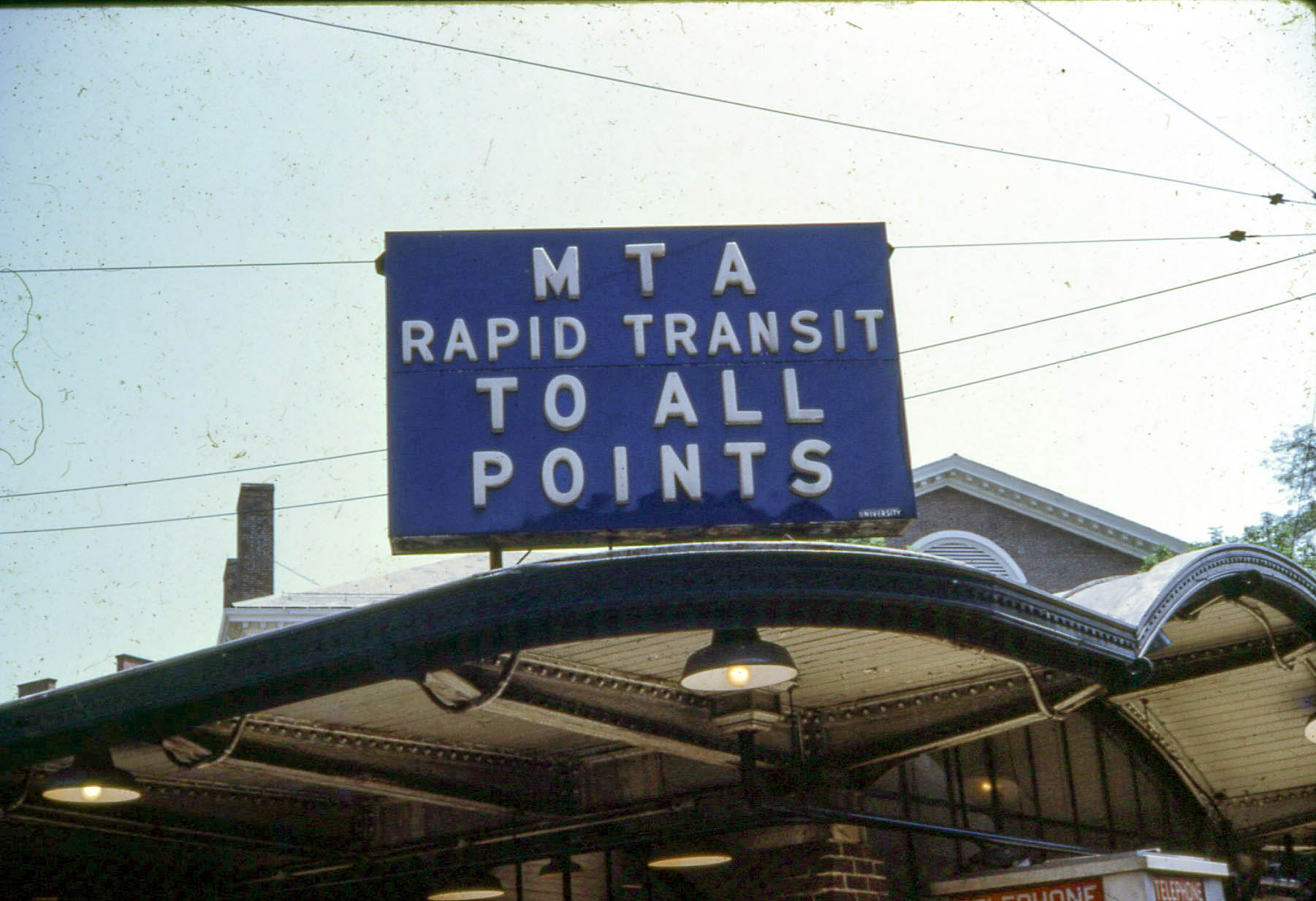
Roof of station headhouse in 1967; this structure is now a newsstand near its original location.

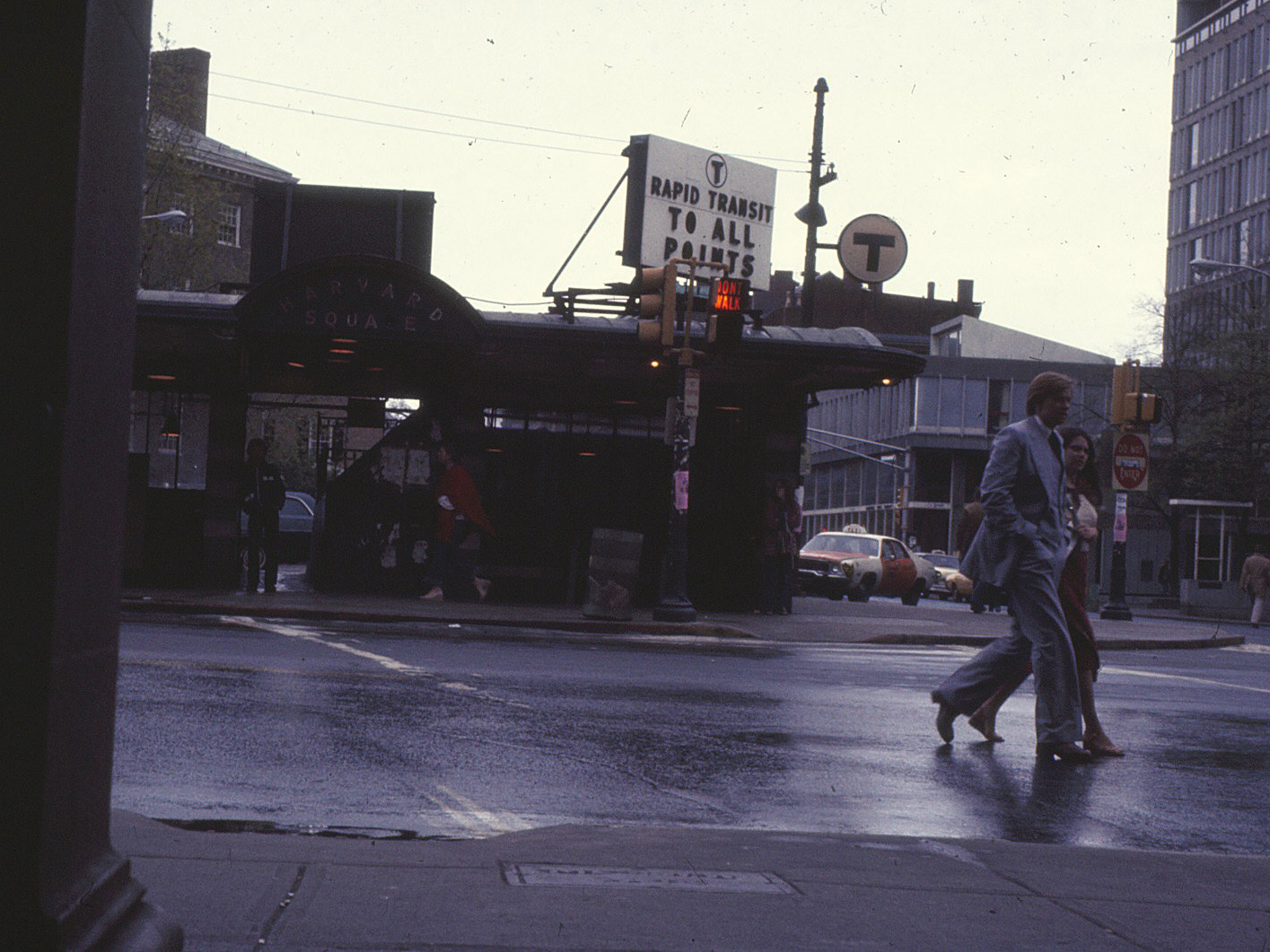
Station headhouse as seen in 1976; by this point the "T" signage was in use.
