= Harvard Square Subway Kiosk =

- U.S. National Register of Historic Places
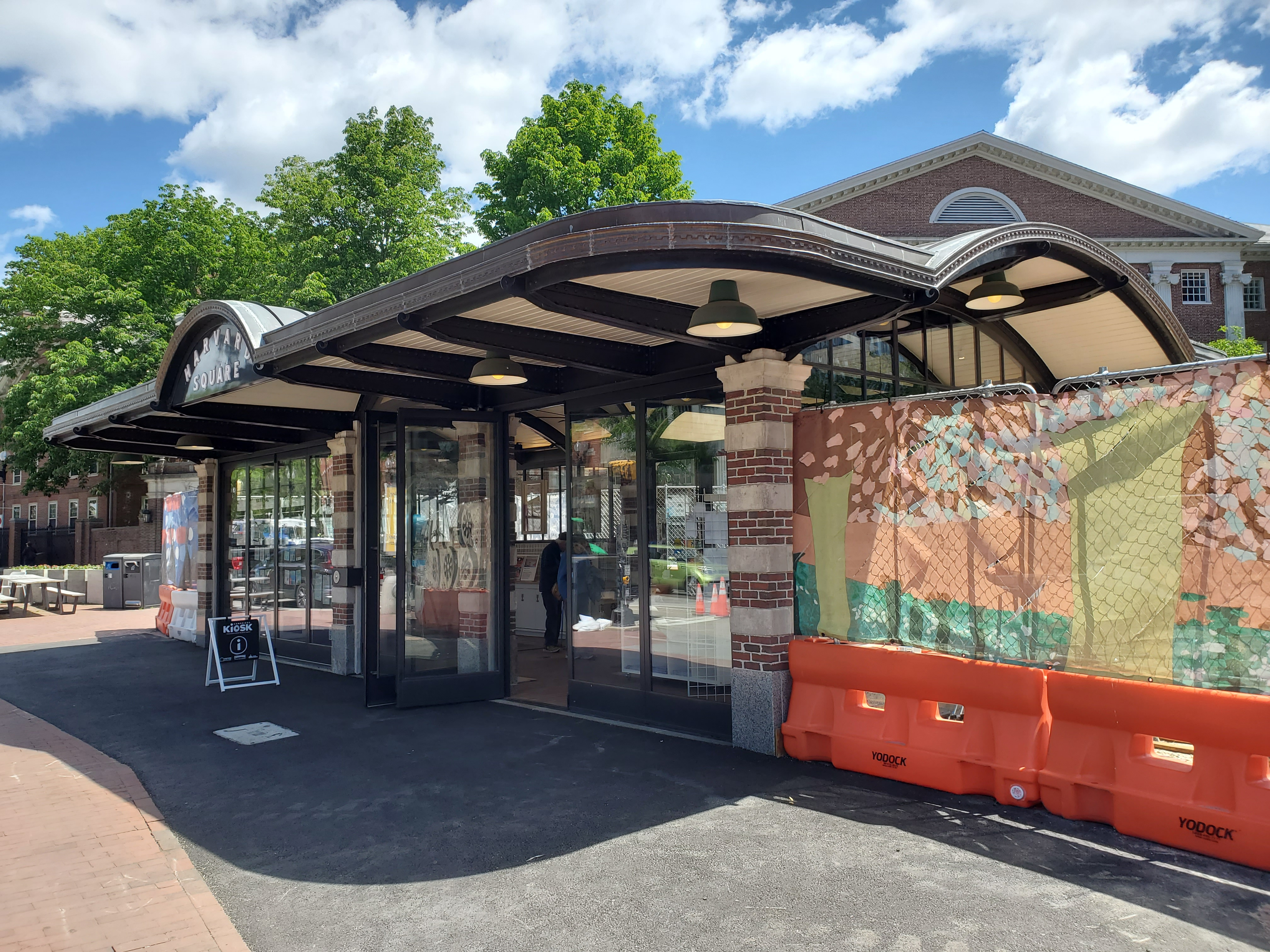
- Harvard Square Subway Kiosk in June 2025

- Location within Massachusetts
- Location: 0 Harvard Square; Cambridge, Massachusetts
- Coordinates: 42.37358°N 71.11896°W
- Area: Interior: ~500 square feet (46 m^{2}); Roof: ~1,350 square feet (125 m^{2})
- Built: November 1927–January 1928
- Architect: Blackall, Clapp & Whittemore
- NRHP reference No.: 78000441
- Added to NRHP: January 30, 1978

The Harvard Square Subway Kiosk is a historic kiosk and landmark located in Harvard Square in Cambridge, Massachusetts. It was built in 1928 as the new main headhouse (entrance building) for the previously opened Harvard Square subway station. After the station closed in 1981 for major renovations, the kiosk was moved slightly and renovated. The Out of Town News newsstand, which opened in 1955, occupied the kiosk from 1984 to 2019. It was renovated from 2020 to 2025 for public use.

== History ==
=== Subway entrance ===
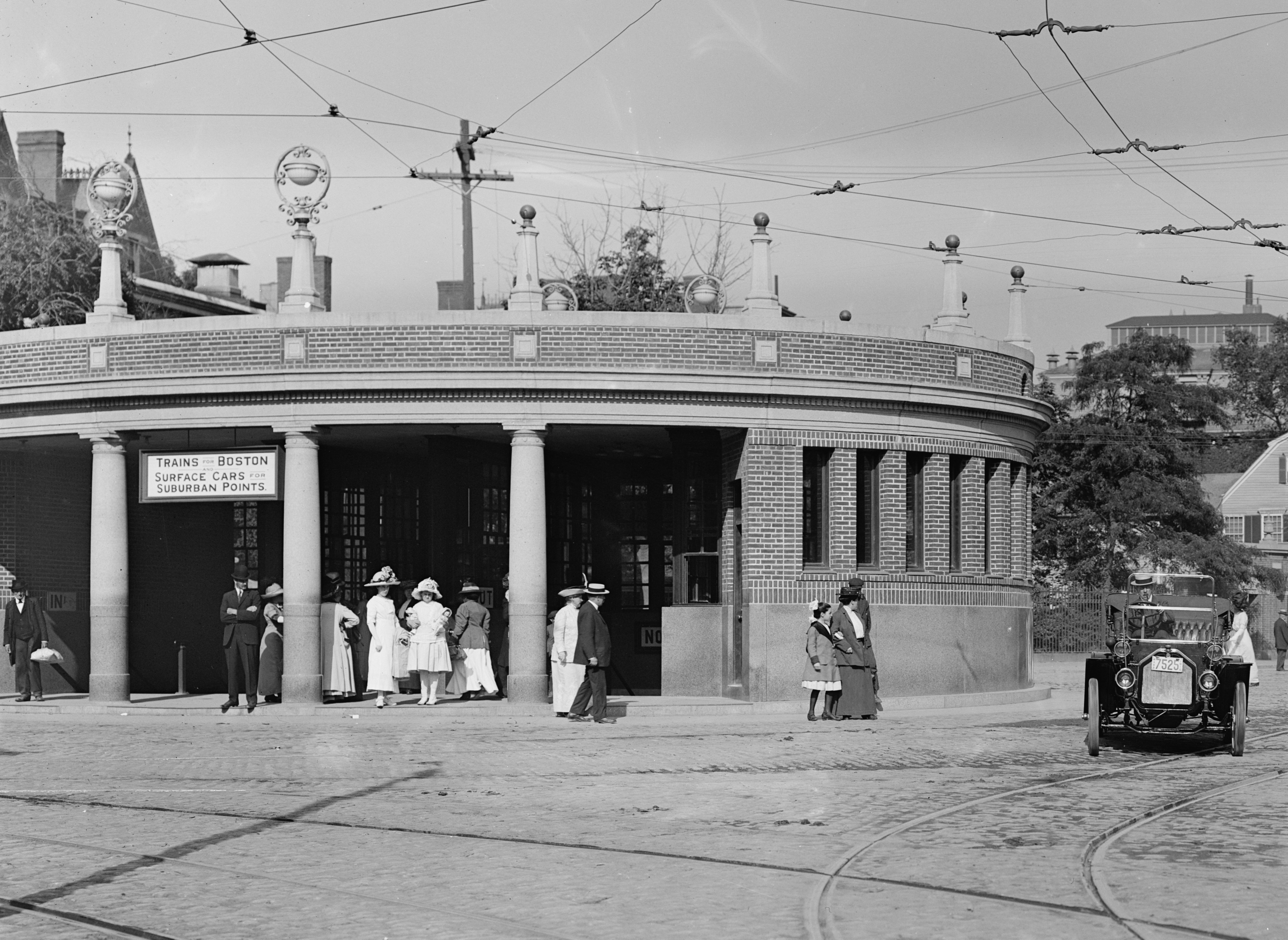
The original 1912-built headhouse, which was demolished in 1927

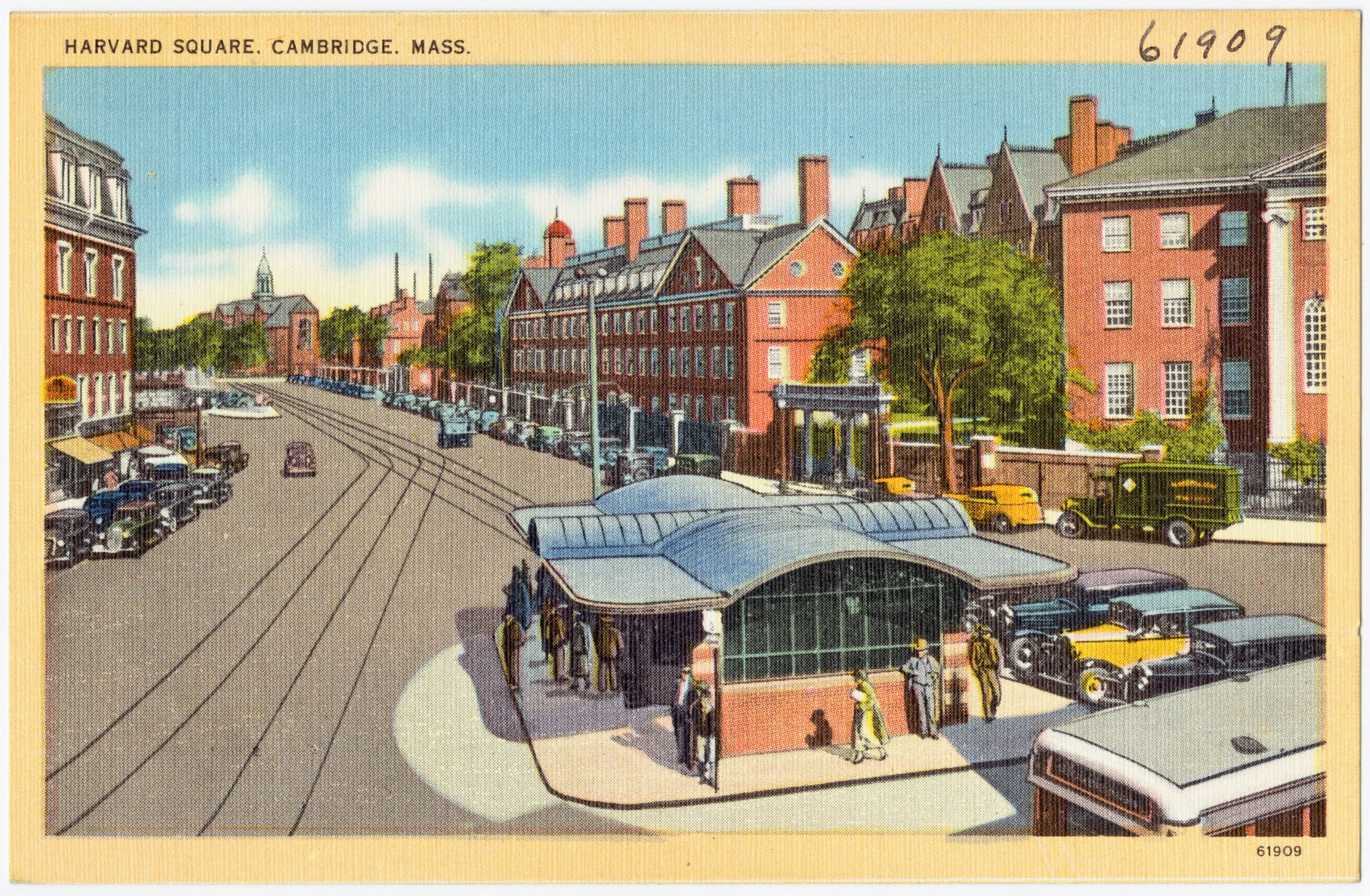
A 1930s postcard of Harvard Square with the headhouse at center foreground

After debate about running an elevated rapid transit line above business districts in Cambridge, the Boston Elevated Railway (BERy) agreed in late 1906 to build a subway line from Boston to Harvard Square. Construction began on May 24, 1909. The Cambridge subway opened from Harvard Square to Park Street Under on March 23, 1912. Early plans called for an upright stone entrance (headhouse) in the center of Harvard Square, similar to those at Scollay Square and Adams Square. The headhouse was ultimately constructed as a 40-by-60-foot (12 m × 18 m) oval-shaped brick-and-stone structure, with several smaller entrances and exits around the square.

Although originally considered a worthy addition to the Square, the headhouse attracted criticism beginning in 1919. Its size meant that motorists could not see traffic approaching on other streets, and it left no room for sidewalks where passengers could wait for streetcars. In 1921, the Massachusetts Department of Public Utilities (DPU) determined that it would not be feasible to completely replace the central headhouse with smaller headhouses located elsewhere in the Square. The DPU was not opposed to Cambridge constructing a smaller headhouse structure, but would not allow the state or the BERy to bear the costs.

MIT civil engineering professor Charles B. Breed completed a study of the headhouse in February 1925, concluding that the headhouse could be reduced to 20% of its original size at a cost of $20,000 (equivalent to $284,000 in 2024). Breed proposed to have the 17-by-25-foot (5.2 m × 7.6 m) structure cover only the exit escalator and one of the two stairwells; the remaining stairwell would be covered with a hatch and only used on high-demand days. On April 30, 1925, the state legislature authorized the DPU to modify the headhouse at a cost up to $30,000. Cambridge was to pay half the cost; the state would loan the BERy the remaining half.

That July, the DPU viewed models of Breed's proposal, as well as a larger proposal by the BERy that kept both stairwells. Public reaction to Breed's utilitarian design was "swift and overwhelmingly negative"; one state representative likened it to an outhouse. In November 1925, architect Clarence H. Blackall began advising the DPU on the headhouse design. Blackhall's design was eventually approved by the Cambridge City Council in February 1927, and the BERy began engineering work that February. The DPU awarded a $15,950 construction contraction on October 21, 1927; work began in November and was completed in January 1928. Despite his previous prominence as an architect, the contribution of Blackhall's firm (Blackall, Clapp & Whittemore) was largely ignored in the press.

The new headhouse measured 15 1/2 by 36 feet (4.7 m × 11.0 m), covered by a roof measuring about 30 by 44 feet (9.1 m × 13.4 m). It was divided into two pavilions: the 15 1/2-by-12-foot (4.7 m × 3.7 m) south section around the exit stairwell and the 15 1/2-by-15-foot (4.7 m × 4.6 m) north section around the entrance stairwell, with an exit escalator and a pedestrian passage between them. The structure was of industrial style, though it fit in with the Colonial Revival architecture of Harvard Square. The pavilions were each supported by steel pillars clad in limestone and brick salvaged from the old headhouse. Three sides of each had low walls, with wire glass above to allow visibility through the structure for motorists. The thin copper roof was shaped as intersecting barrel vaults, with flat rectangles at the corners. The "artistic appearance" of the new structure was favorably compared to the former "pillbox".

At some point within the next decade, internally-illuminated signs reading "HARVARD SQUARE" were added inside the arches. Rooftop signs reading "Rapid Transit to All Points/Eight Minutes to Park Street" were added in the 1940s. The city again considered relocating the headhouse in 1944, but found the $1 million (equivalent to $14 million in 2024) cost too high. In 1962, the MTA (successor to the BERy) proposed to relocate the station southward into Bennett Yard, with the kiosk and buses removed from the Square. However, by this time, the kiosk was beginning to be recognized as a significant symbol of the Square; in the mid-1960s, architecture critic Ian Nairn called it "an urban epigram in a tiny space... probably the most important space in Harvard."

The 1964-formed Massachusetts Bay Transportation Authority (MBTA) renamed the Harvard–Ashmont subway line as the Red Line in 1967. Among the MBTA's expansion projects was a long-proposed northwest extension of the Red Line. Several alignments near Harvard Square were considered; by 1977, the MBTA planned to reroute the line northwards through the Square itself. The wholly reconfigured station would have three smaller headhouses around the Square. That year, the Cambridge Historical Commission nominated the headhouse for the National Register of Historic Places (NRHP) - a designation which requires mitigation of any adverse effects by federally- or state-funded projects. It was added to the NRHP on January 30, 1978, as "Harvard Square Subway Kiosk".

In August 1977, the MBTA agreed to preserve the structure by dismantling it during construction, then reassembling it for reuse as a newsstand. By 1978, the MBTA planned for the restored kiosk to occupy its original location, with a single new headhouse to the south. Harvard station closed for reconstruction on January 31, 1981. The headhouse was disassembled that February; the copper roof and the brick and limestone of the pillars were placed in storage. The kiosk was included in the Harvard Square Historic District in its 1982 NRHP addition, though it also retained its separation registration. In 1983, ownership of the disassembled kiosk was passed to the City of Cambridge.

=== Out of Town News ===
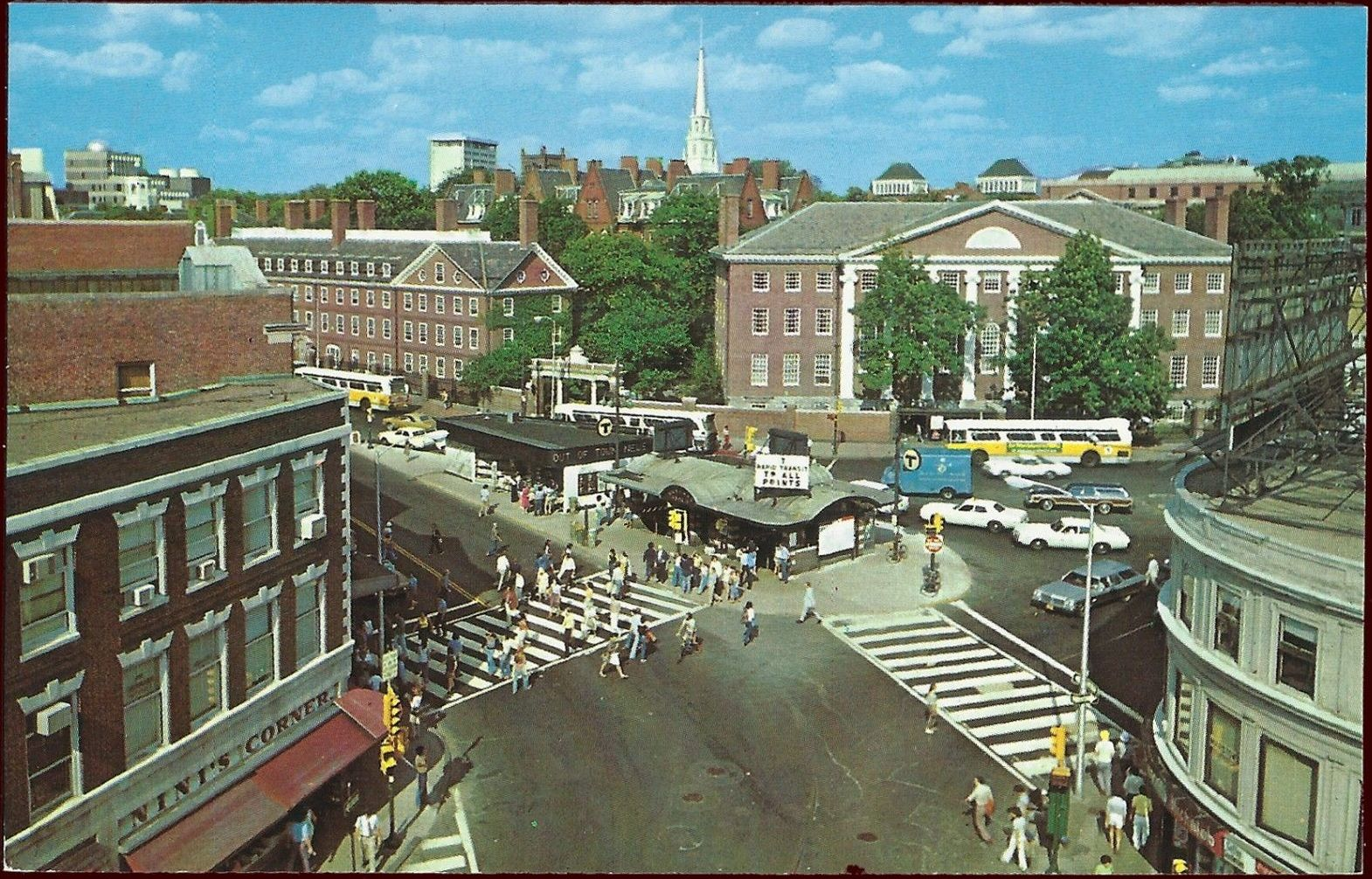
Circa-1970s postcard of Harvard Square, showing Out of Town News in its former location (dark roof) next to the subway entrance kiosk

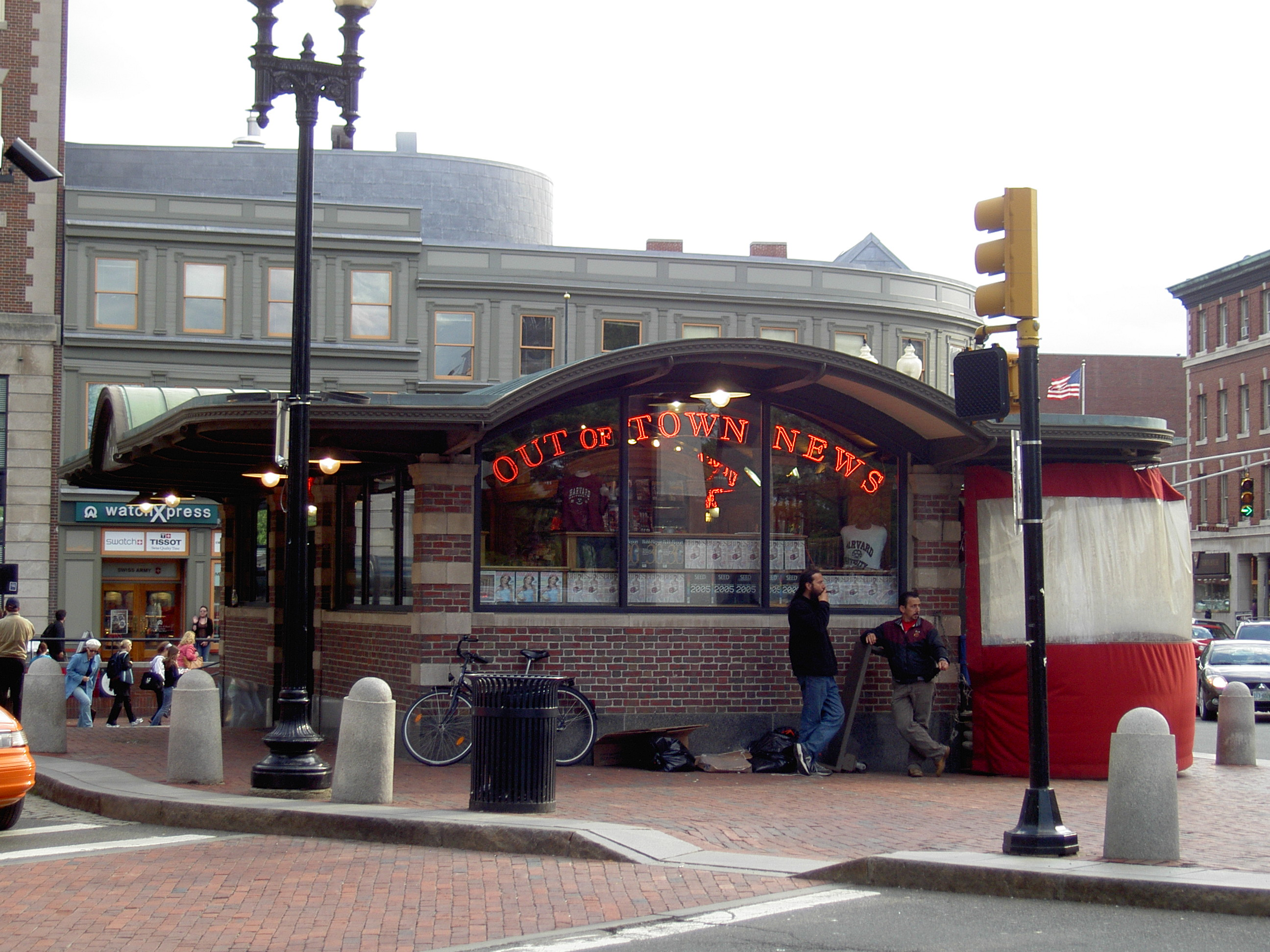
Out of Town News in 2006

Out of Town News was founded in 1955 by Sheldon Cohen. Cohen operated several other businesses around the square, and was known as the “unofficial mayor of Harvard Square". Originally located just north of the subway headhouse, the newsstand was long noted for stocking leading newspapers, magazines, and periodicals from around the nation and around the world – many of which were flown to Boston to be available just one day after printing. Customers, especially academics, came to get the most recent editions of their hometown paper or of newspapers from parts of the world where important news events were unfolding.

The newsstand also became famous for its regular clientele and visitors. John Kenneth Galbraith and Julia Child were both regular customers, and Robert Frost once asked for directions at the stand on the way to a poetry reading. Paul Allen, then a young programmer at Honeywell, bought the January 1975 issue of Popular Electronics at Out of Town News. The magazine inspired Allen and his friend Bill Gates to found Microsoft that April.

In 1984, Out of Town News moved into the former subway kiosk structure, which had been relocated a few feet north of its original location on June 8. In 1994, Cohen sold Out of Town News to Hudson News, although it kept its name and unique business model. Responding to the 1994 sale, a citizen group submitted a petition to landmark the kiosk, but the Cambridge Historical Committee decided that the lease restrictions on the kiosk were sufficient protections.

In 2008, it was announced that the newsstand might go out of business, principally because its unique function of supplying yesterday's newspapers was made obsolete by the ability to read them online. By then, the physical structure also required hundreds of thousands of dollars for repairs. In January 2009, a new owner, Muckey's Corporation, won a bidding competition and signed a lease to take over the newsstand. Muckey's diversified the stand's offering with more typical magazines and convenience store fare, but maintained the original name.

In 2013, the city began studying use and possible renovation of Harvard Square, including possibly further restoration or reworking of the kiosk. When the long-term lease expired in January 2016, the city signed a month-to-month lease ending in July 2017, while exploring its options for the space. In August 2016, the city announced plans to convert the structure to a glass-walled public space, despite the lessee's offer to contribute to the renovations if the business could stay.

In September 2016, a citizen group again petitioned the Cambridge Historical Commission to designate the kiosk as a protected landmark, which would effectively stop the proposed major renovation. In November 2016, the Cambridge Historical Commission voted in support of proceeding with a landmark study.

In January 2018, Touloukian Touloukian Inc. architects were awarded the redevelopment project for the kiosk.

Out of Town News closed on October 31, 2019. Temporary artwork was placed in the kiosk until renovation began. The kiosk reopened on May 30, 2025 as Cambridge KiOSK, operated by the local nonprofit CultureHouse.

== See also ==
- National Register of Historic Places listings in Cambridge, Massachusetts
