= Flagstaff Park =

Park in Cambridge, Massachusetts, U.S.

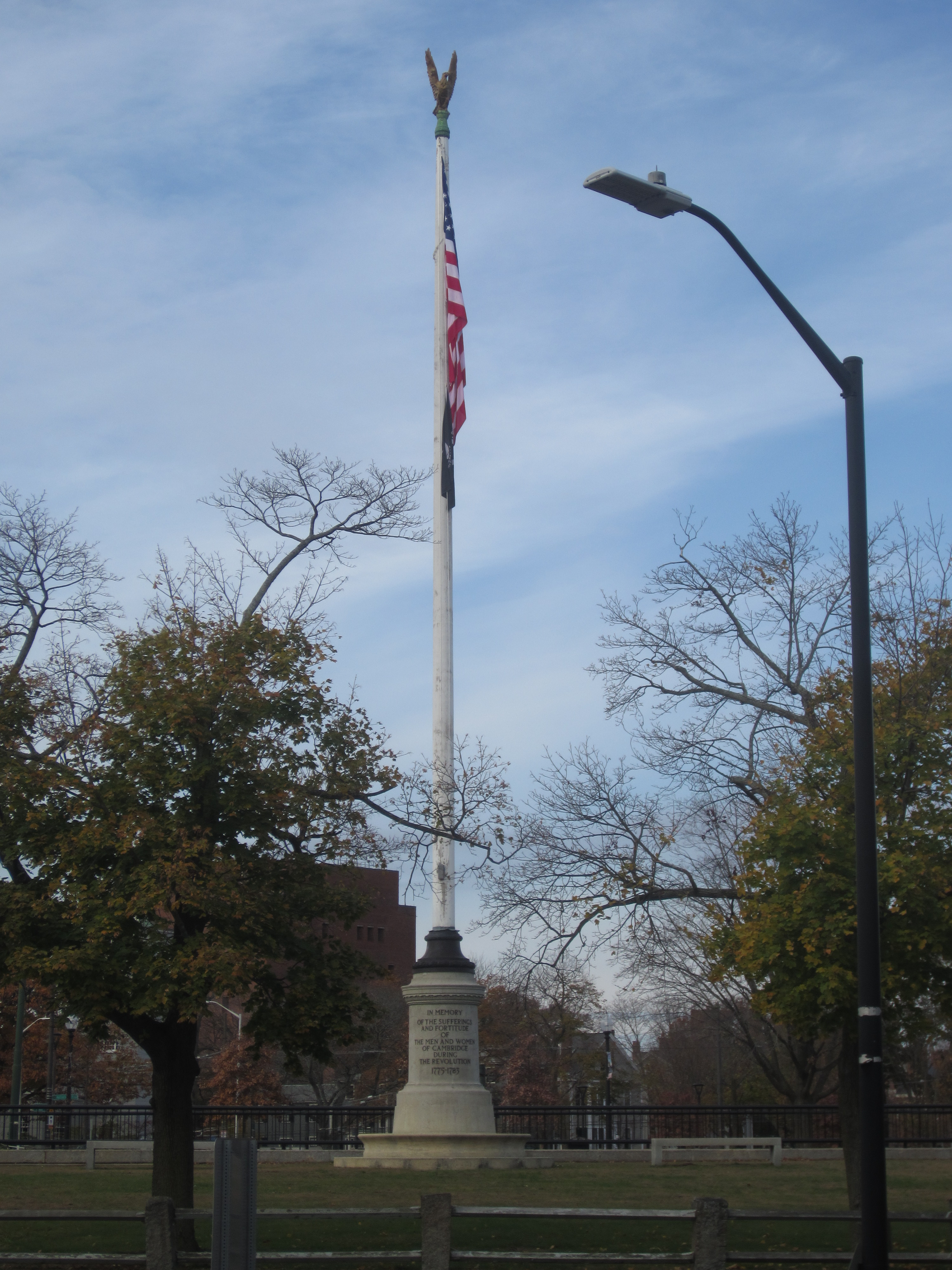
- The park's flagpole, 2019
- Interactive map of Flagstaff Park
- Type: Park
- Nearest city: Cambridge, Massachusetts, U.S.
- Coordinates: 42°22′32.5″N 71°07′08.0″W
- Designer: Peabody & Stearns (flagstaff)

Flagstaff Park is a park in Cambridge, Massachusetts, United States.

A two-way path for bicyclists and pedestrians was added in 2016.

== Flagstaff ==
The park's flagstaff was proposed by the Daughters of the American Revolution and designed by Peabody & Stearns in 1913. It was erected in memory of Cambridge men who lost their lives in the American Revolutionary War. The flagstaff consists of a circular concrete and bronze base with a pole rising to a height of more than 90 feet. A copper eagle tops the pole. The inscription reads:

IN MEMORY OF THE SUFFERINGS AND FORTITUDE OF THE MEN AND WOMEN OF CAMBRIDGE DURING THE REVOLUTION 1775–1783
