= Second Cambridge Savings Bank Building =

- U.S. National Register of Historic Places
- U.S. Historic district – Contributing property
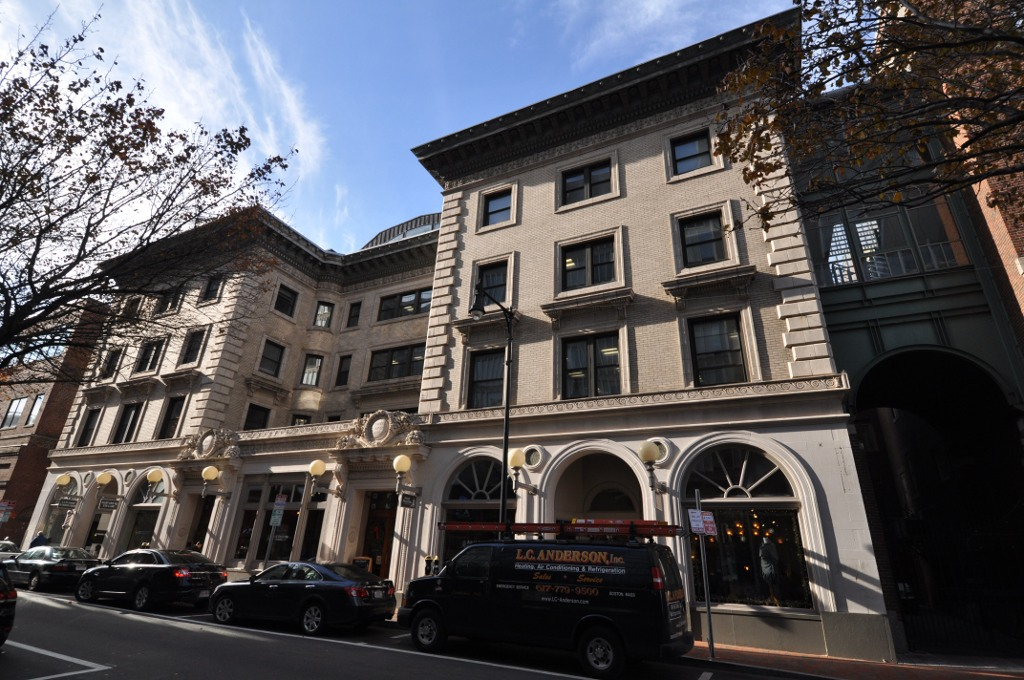

- Location within Massachusetts Location within the United States
- Location: Cambridge, Massachusetts
- Coordinates: 42°22′22.4″N 71°7′9.0″W
- Built: 1897
- Architect: Blackall, C.H.
- Architectural style: Renaissance
- Part of: Harvard Square Historic District (ID86003654)
- MPS: Cambridge MRA
- NRHP reference No.: 83000826

Significant dates
- Added to NRHP: June 30, 1983
- Designated CP: July 28, 1988

The Second Cambridge Savings Bank Building is an historic bank building at 11–21 Dunster Street in Cambridge, Massachusetts. The Italian Renaissance masonry building was built in 1897 by the Cambridge Savings Bank. It is a four-story building, with a frieze of fleur-de-lis patterning separating the first floor from the upper floors, and a metal cornice below the roof. The building corners are quoined on the upper levels, and there are a pair of matching entrances. It is one of the finest examples of pre–World War I architecture in Harvard Square.

The building was listed on the National Register of Historic Places in 1983, and included in an expansion of the Harvard Square Historic District in 1988.

== See also ==
- National Register of Historic Places listings in Cambridge, Massachusetts
