= Building at 1707–1709 Cambridge Street =

Historic house in Massachusetts, United States

- U.S. National Register of Historic Places
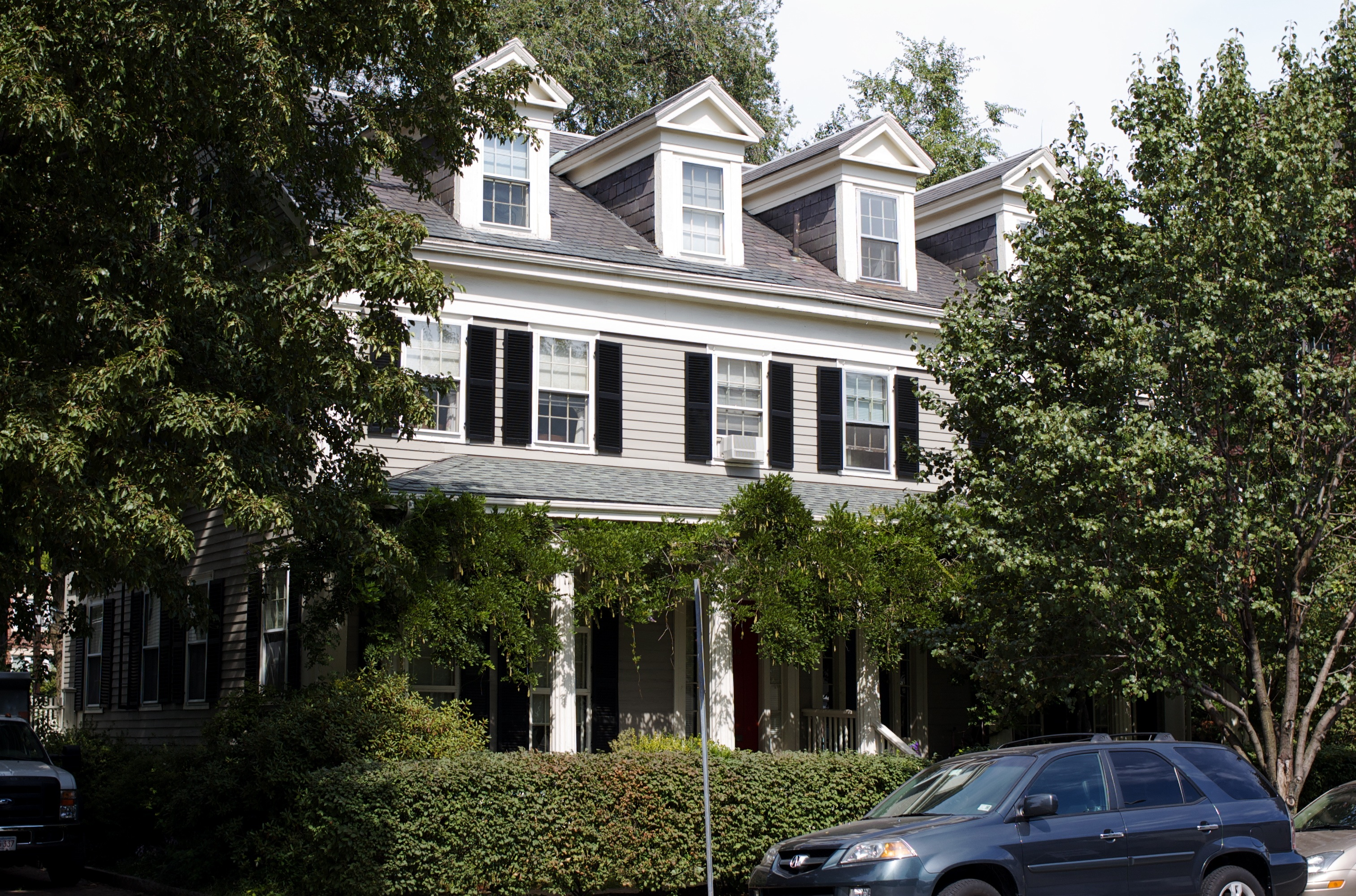

- Location within Massachusetts Location within the United States
- Location: 1707–1709 Cambridge St., Cambridge, Massachusetts
- Coordinates: 42°22′31.4″N 71°06′43.7″W
- Area: less than one acre
- Built: 1845
- Architect: Mather Hayward
- Architectural style: Greek Revival
- MPS: Cambridge MRA
- NRHP reference No.: 83000787
- Added to NRHP: June 30, 1983

The Building at 1707–1709 Cambridge Street is an historic multifamily house in Cambridge, Massachusetts. Built in 1845, it is one of two identical surviving rental properties built by a local developer (out of four originally built). The survival of their original building contracts provides an important window into the understanding of 19th-century building practices. The house was listed on the National Register of Historic Places in 1983.

== Description and history ==
1707-09 Cambridge Street is located a short way east of Harvard Square, on the north side of Cambridge Street, opposite its junction with Felton Street and just east of 1715–17 Cambridge Street, its virtual duplicate. It is a 2 1/2-story wood-frame structure, with a side-gable roof and clapboarded exterior. The roof is pierced by four dormers with fully pedimented gable fronts, their windows flanked by small pilasters rising to entablatures. The building corners are also pilastered, rising to an entablature that encircles the building. The side gables are also fully pedimented. A single-story porch extends across the front, with Doric columns supporting an entablature and hip roof. The facade is six bays wide, with entrances in the two center bays.

This house, the one next door, and two others since demolished, were all built in 1845 as speculative rental property for Royal Richardson, a prominent local real estate developer. When completed, the four identical buildings would have presented a striking appearance on the north side of Cambridge Street. The survival of the contracts for their construction adds to their importance in understanding 19th century building practices, which lacked plans but included detailed specifications that mentioned existing buildings whose features and elements were to be copied.

== See also ==
- National Register of Historic Places listings in Cambridge, Massachusetts
