= Cox Hicks House =

Historic house in Cambridge, Massachusetts

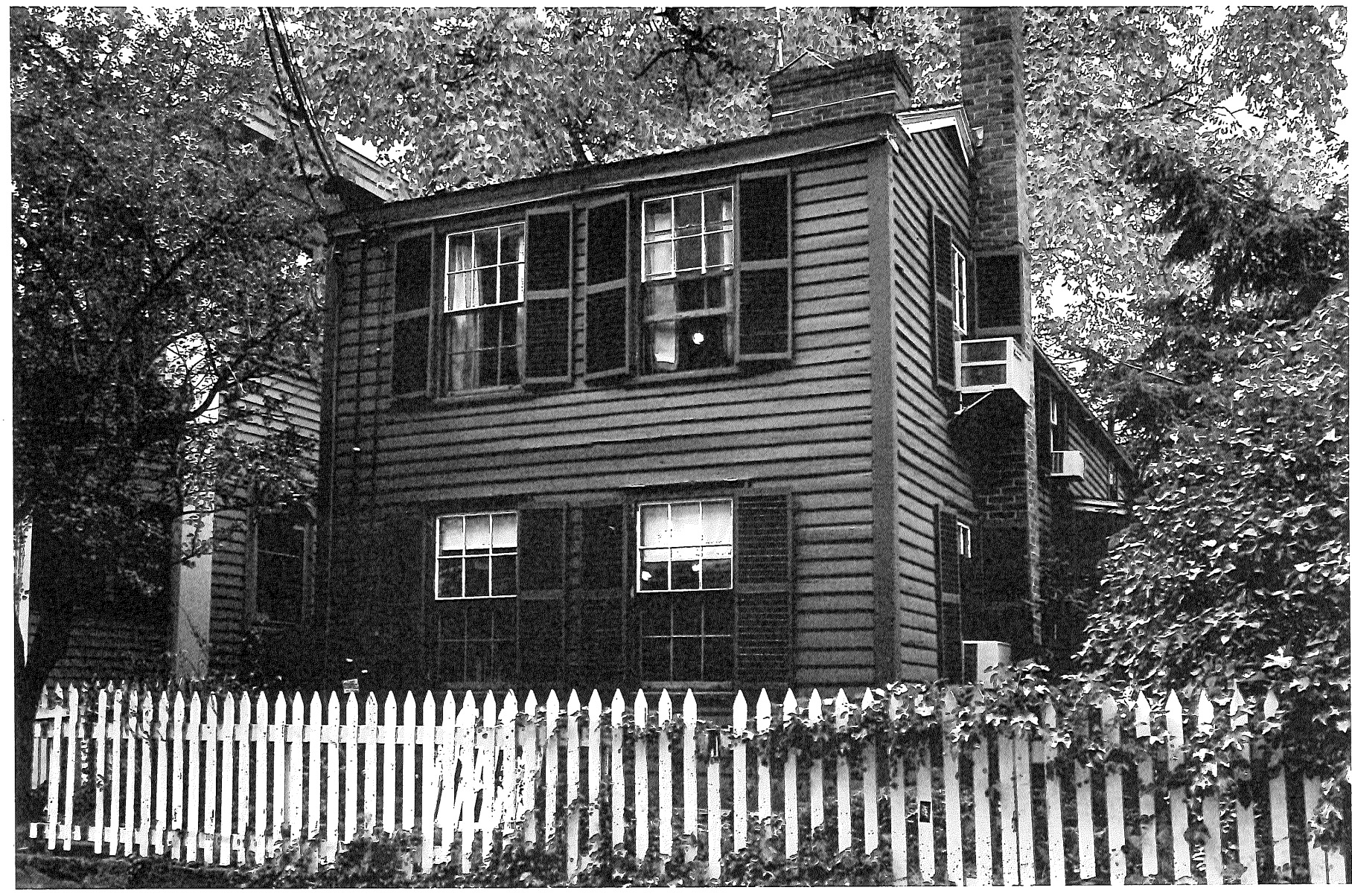

The Cox-Hicks House, located at 98 Winthrop Street in Cambridge, Massachusetts, was built around 1806. It is an example of the modest housing available to the working class in Cambridge during the late 18th and early 19th centuries. The house is located within the Winthrop Square National Register District and the Massachusetts MPS Harvard Square Historic District (NAID: 63792030).

== Historical background ==
The house was constructed by Israel Porter as a tenant residence for Susannah Cox, who later returned ownership to Porter in 1810. Soon after, the property was sold to Sarah Hicks Flagg, resulting in its combined name. Its placement on the Roxbury puddingstone retaining wall reflects historical construction techniques used in the area during that period.

== Architectural significance ==
The structure is an example of vernacular architecture, characterized by its small scale and utilitarian design. As such, the Cox-Hicks House provides insight into the simpler housing solutions available to the working class in early Cambridge. The associated retaining wall at 106 Winthrop Street, built to terrace the hillside into level residential lots, remains intact and is composed of Roxbury puddingstone, shale, and granite. The wall retains its original materials and craftsmanship, representing early urban engineering techniques in Cambridge.
