= Kerry Corner =

Coordinates: 42°22′06″N 71°06′53″W

Kerry Corner in Cambridge, Massachusetts, United States, also called the Lower Marsh, is a reclaimed, 10-block area from the Charles River during the construction of the Harvard River Dormitories. Kerry Corner is made up of Bank Street on the blocks between Flagg and Cowperthwaite Streets. In a deal with the city of Cambridge, Harvard sold much of the reclaimed land along Putnam Avenue to parishioners of St. Paul's Church in nearby Harvard Square. The new immigrants that moved to the area were almost entirely of Irish descent, and many hailed from County Kerry, one of the hardest hit in the Irish Famine, thus giving the area its name. It was claimed that not only did residents have to be Irish to live in the area, but if a resident did not come from County Kerry, the neighbours would move out their furniture.

For a long time this small quarter near Harvard housed some of the poorest people in the city, and still has several low income housing developments in around Putnam Avenue. It was described by Time Magazine in 1944 as "Cambridge's Hell's Kitchen. Although now mostly gentrified with condos taking over the former triple deckers of Irish immigrants, old residents still refer to it as the Kerry Corner.
