= Charles Schuebeler House =

Historic house in Massachusetts, United States

- U.S. National Register of Historic Places
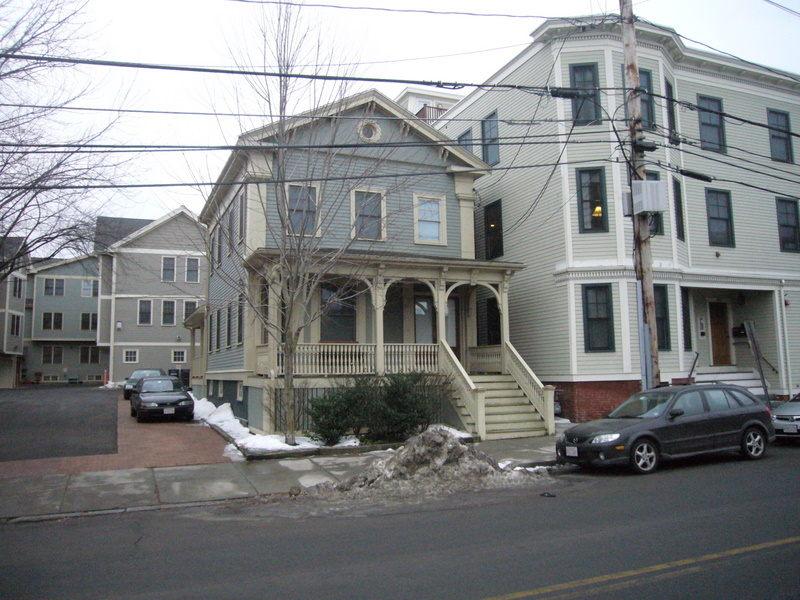

- Location within Massachusetts Location within the United States
- Location: 384 Washington Street, Somerville, Massachusetts
- Coordinates: 42°22′31″N 71°6′15″W
- Built: 1860
- Architectural style: Italianate
- MPS: Somerville MPS
- NRHP reference No.: 89001298
- Added to NRHP: September 18, 1989

The Charles Schuebeler House is a historic house in Somerville, Massachusetts. The 2 1/2-story wood frame Italianate house was built c. 1860, and is the only house of its style and period to survive on this section of Washington Street. The street, which joins Somerville's Union Square with Cambridge's Harvard Square, was once lined with similar houses. The house has retained period features, including wide corner pilasters, paired brackets in the gables, and a front porch with trusses and large brackets. Charles Schuebeler was a jeweler.

The house was listed on the National Register of Historic Places in 1989.

== See also ==
- National Register of Historic Places listings in Somerville, Massachusetts
