= S. B. Withey House =

Historic house in Massachusetts, United States

- U.S. National Register of Historic Places
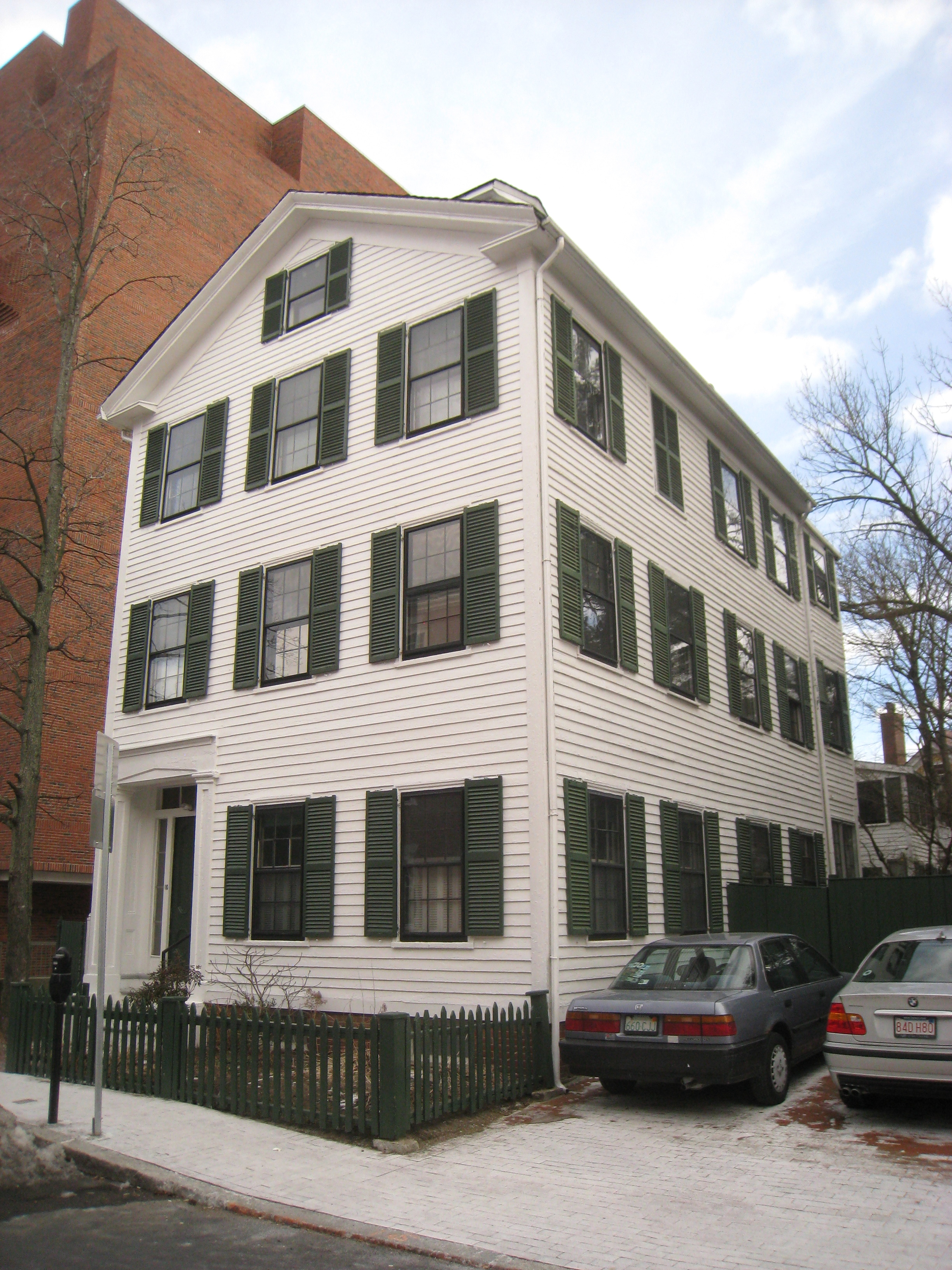

- Location within Massachusetts Location within the United States
- Location: Cambridge, Massachusetts
- Coordinates: 42°22′31.1″N 71°7′17.7″W
- Built: 1855
- Architect: Withey, S.B.
- Architectural style: Greek Revival
- MPS: Cambridge MRA
- NRHP reference No.: 86001318
- Added to NRHP: May 19, 1986

The S. B. Withey House is an historic house at 10 Appian Way in Cambridge, Massachusetts. It is a 3 1/2-story wood-frame Greek Revival house, three bays wide, with a front-facing gable roof and clapboard siding. Its entrance is recessed in the leftmost bay in an opening flanked by pilasters and topped by a Tudor arch. The house was built c. 1855–56 by S. B. Withey, and is one of a few residential houses in the Harvard Square area that still stands at its original site.

The house was listed on the National Register of Historic Places in 1986.

== See also ==
- National Register of Historic Places listings in Cambridge, Massachusetts
