= Schoenhof's Foreign Books =

Bookstore in Boston

Coordinates: 42°22′19.2″N 71°7′8.2″W

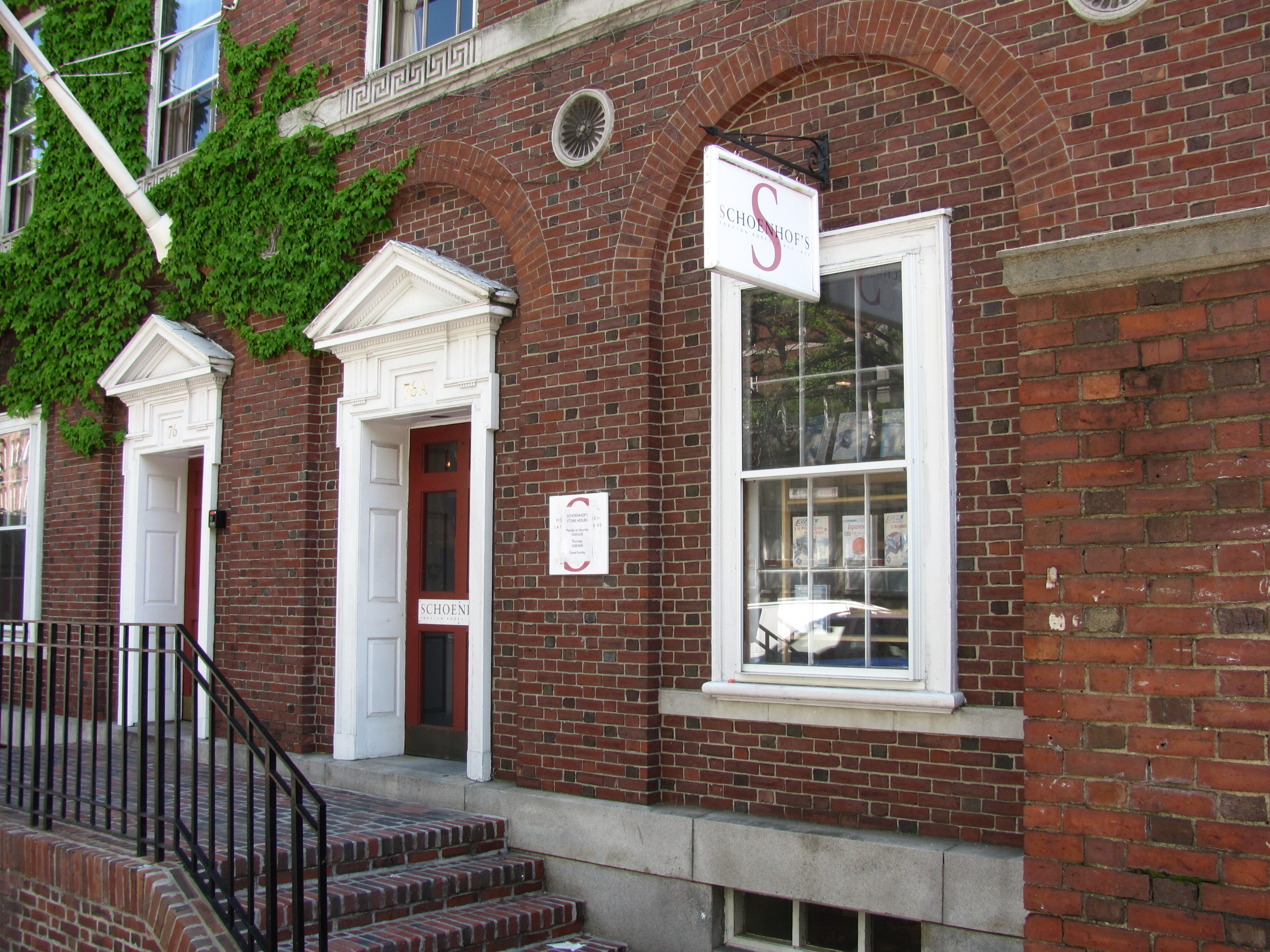
Schoenhof's Foreign Books

Schoenhof's Foreign Books was a brick and mortar specialty bookstore in Cambridge, Massachusetts, near Harvard Square. Founded in Boston in 1856, Schoenhof's claims to be the oldest foreign language book dealer in the United States and to offer the largest selection of foreign language books in North America. The bookstore is itself the fourth oldest in the country. During the 1970’s the store was owned and operated by Mr. and Mrs. Furatini, refugees of the Second World War, and at least one survivor of the holocaust in Europe, Mr. Evers. Its retail storefront closed on March 25, 2017. It continues to do business through its web site.

Schoenhof's is now owned by MEP, Inc., an importer and wholesaler of foreign language books. MEP bought Schoenhof's from Éditions Gallimard in 2005 but did not rename its existing Europa Books retail store in Chicago as Schoenhof's despite initial plans to do so.

Their selection is divided into language learning materials, literature and non-fiction books, and children's books. Over 700 different languages and dialects are represented in the learning section. Literature and non-fiction includes French, Spanish, German, Russian, Italian, Arabic, Chinese, Japanese, Greek, Latin, and biblical studies. The children's section offers works in major Romance, Germanic, Slavic, and Celtic languages.
