= Tasty Sandwich Shop =

Restaurant in Cambridge, Massachusetts

Coordinates: 42.37339°N 71.11938°W

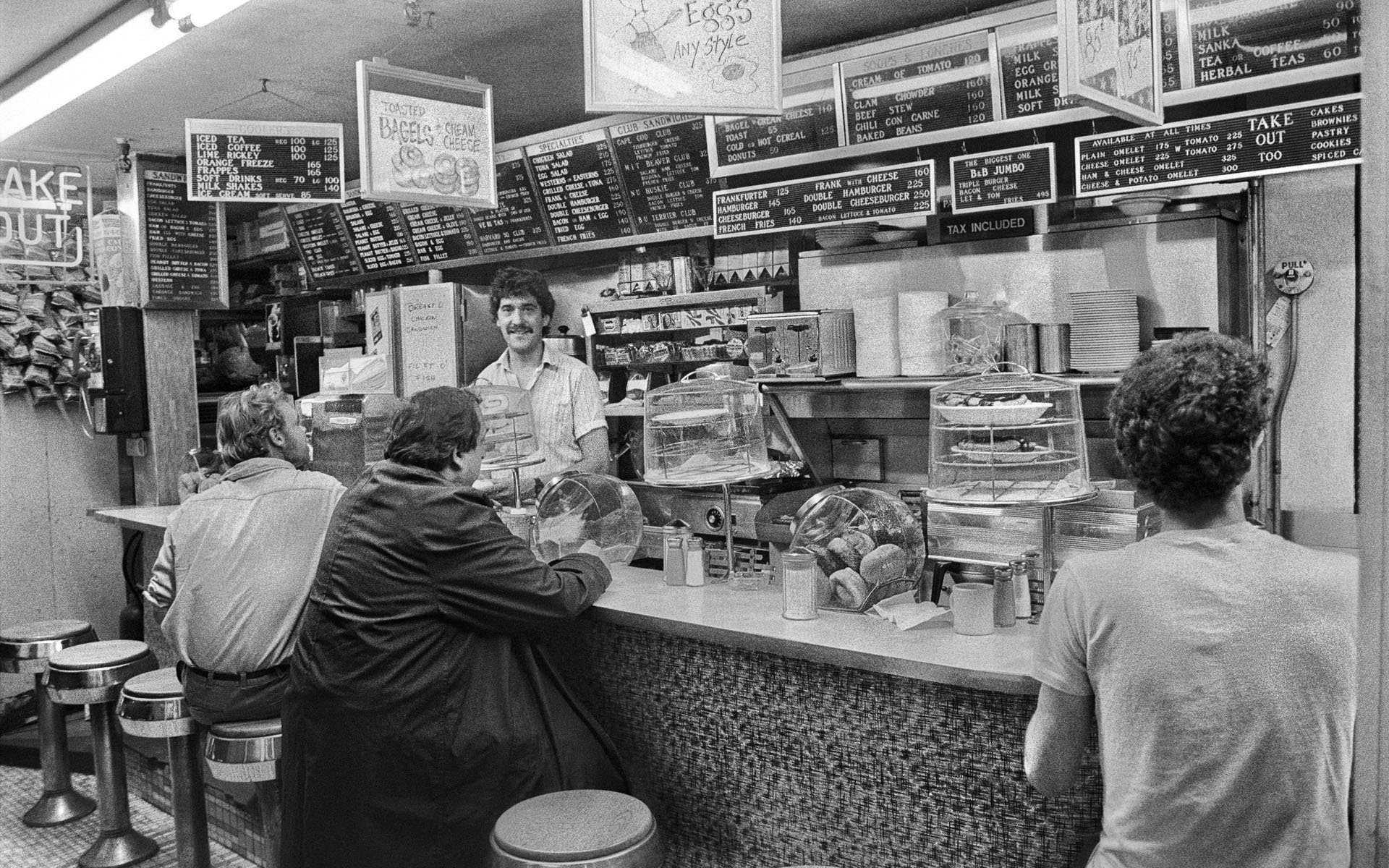
- The Tasty, 1985. Behind the counter is chef Don Valcovic; on the right is Al Nidle, publisher of Street magazine at the time
- Interactive map of Tasty Sandwich Shop

Restaurant information
- Established: 1916
- Closed: 1997
- Location: 2a JFK Street, Cambridge, Massachusetts

The Tasty Sandwich Shop, often called "The Tasty", was a restaurant that operated from 1916 to 1997 near the intersection of JFK Street and Brattle Street, at the center of Harvard Square, in Cambridge, Massachusetts. It was housed in the Read Block building, on the site of the home of colonial poet Anne Bradstreet. The Tasty closed in 1997, after 81 years in business. Its location was later used by the chain stores Abercrombie & Fitch, then Citizens Bank and, as of 2025, a CVS Pharmacy.

== Description ==
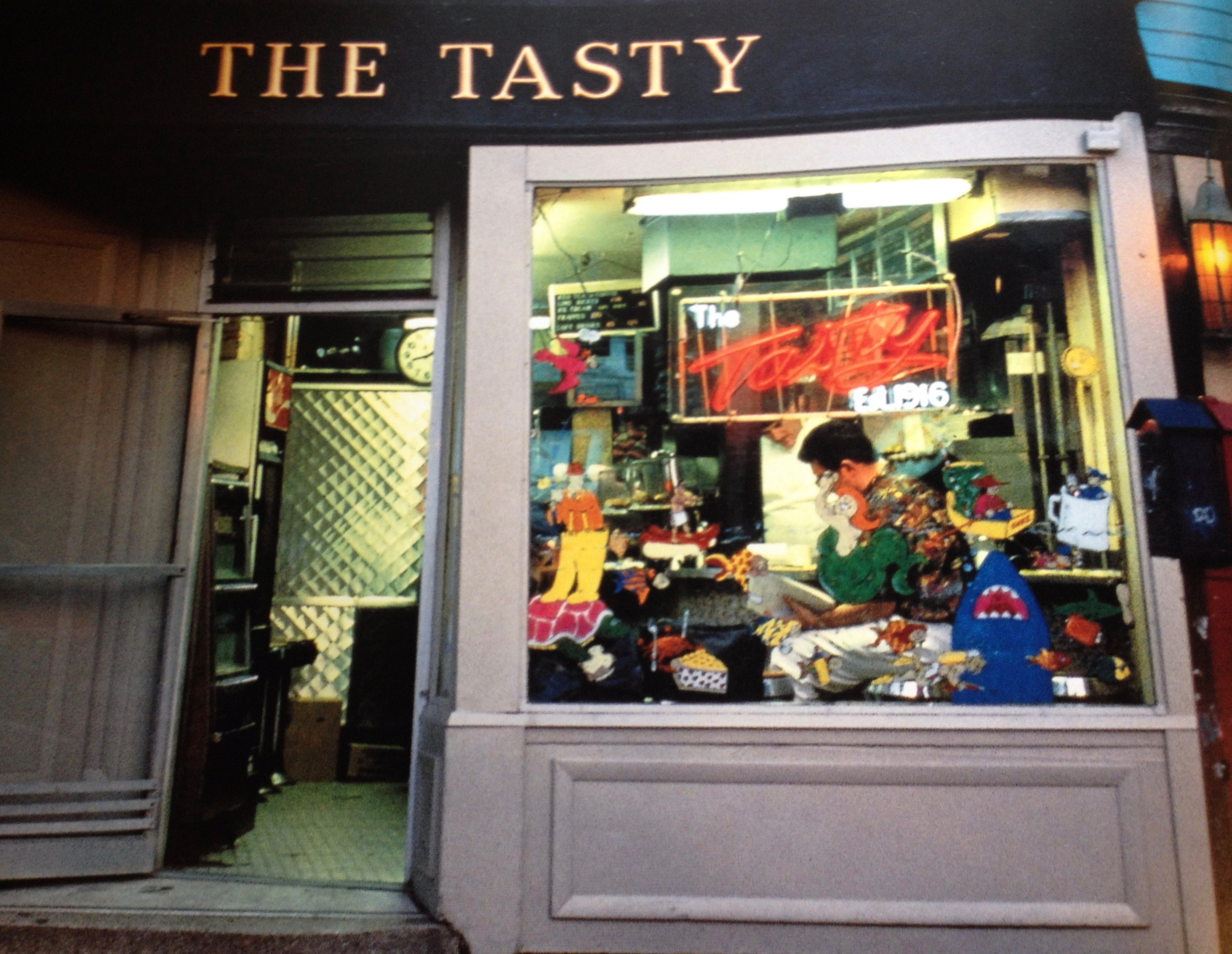
The exterior of The Tasty, 1996

The Tasty was a tiny one-room diner and lunch counter, its customer area no more than seven feet wide and thirty feet deep, with a narrow counter made of yellow linoleum. A Harvard Business School student once deemed it "the most profitable restaurant in New England per sq ft", at 210 sq ft (20 m^{2}). The Tasty had 14 stools.

A large map, studded with pins, covered the back wall of the diner and claimed to pinpoint the origins of postcards from customers over the years. In keeping with the informal atmosphere of the diner — where the cooks, including Tom Sweet, who managed The Tasty on the graveyard shift until the summer of 1976, and chef Charlie Coney — were sometimes compared to bartenders and frequently chatted with customers.

== Customers ==
By the end of its existence, The Tasty had attracted both long-time residents and, by virtue both of its proximity to Harvard Yard and its late opening hours, numerous students from Harvard University, and had become one of the few places where students and residents, and residents from different social and economic classes, mixed informally. According to one historian, "you could sit next to a professor on your left, and a homeless person on your right".

== Media references ==
The Tasty was often referred to in the press as a "local landmark" or "institution", and was immortalized in film during a scene in Good Will Hunting. The scene was shot there on May 23, 1997. It was also used in a scene during Love Story, 1970 movie from Erich Segal's story of a privileged Harvard Law School student (Ryan O'Neal) and his working-class girlfriend (Ali MacGraw). It is also the subject of Federico Muchnik's 2005 documentary, Touching History.

== Closure ==
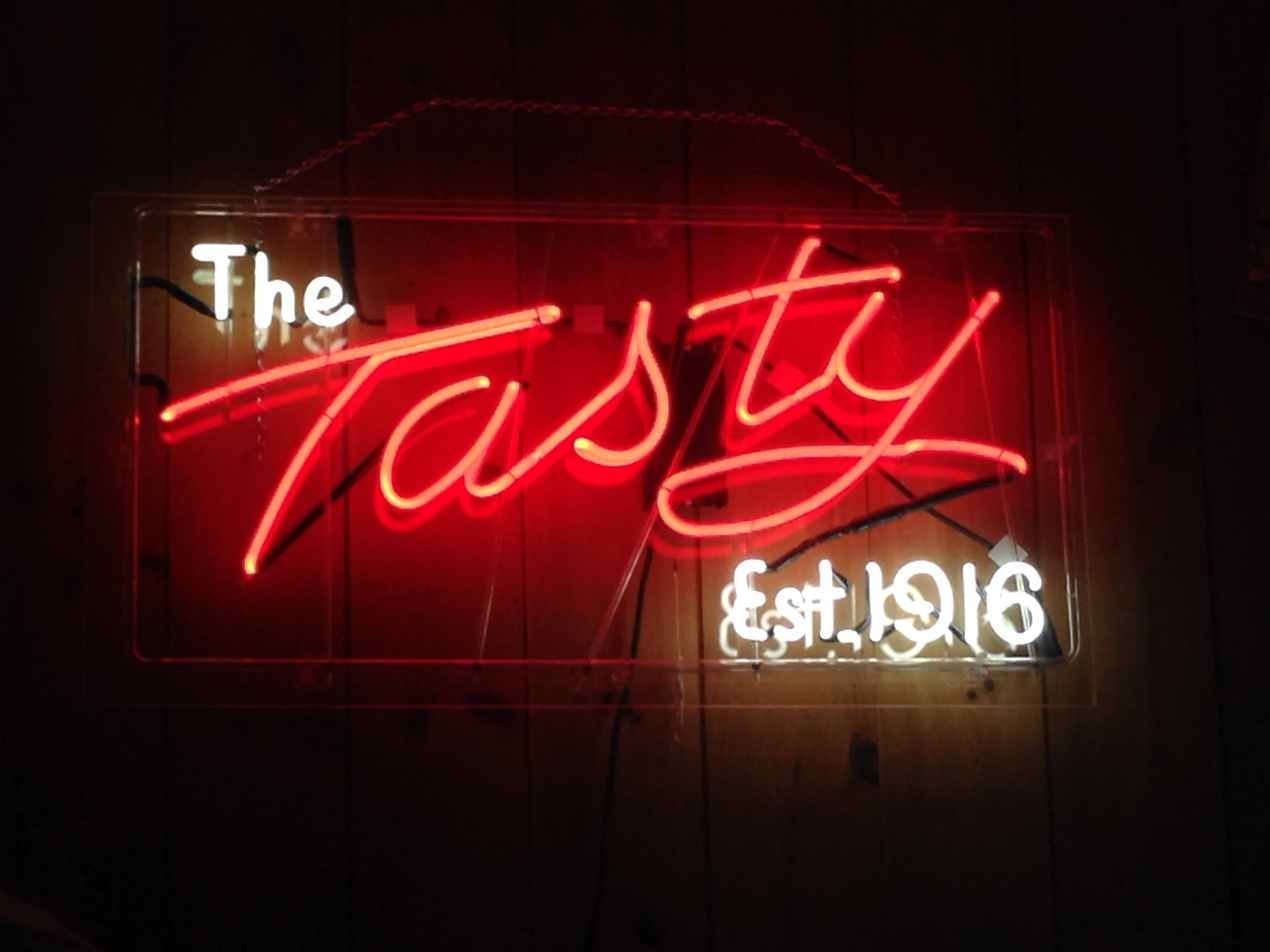
A close-up of the neon sign in the window

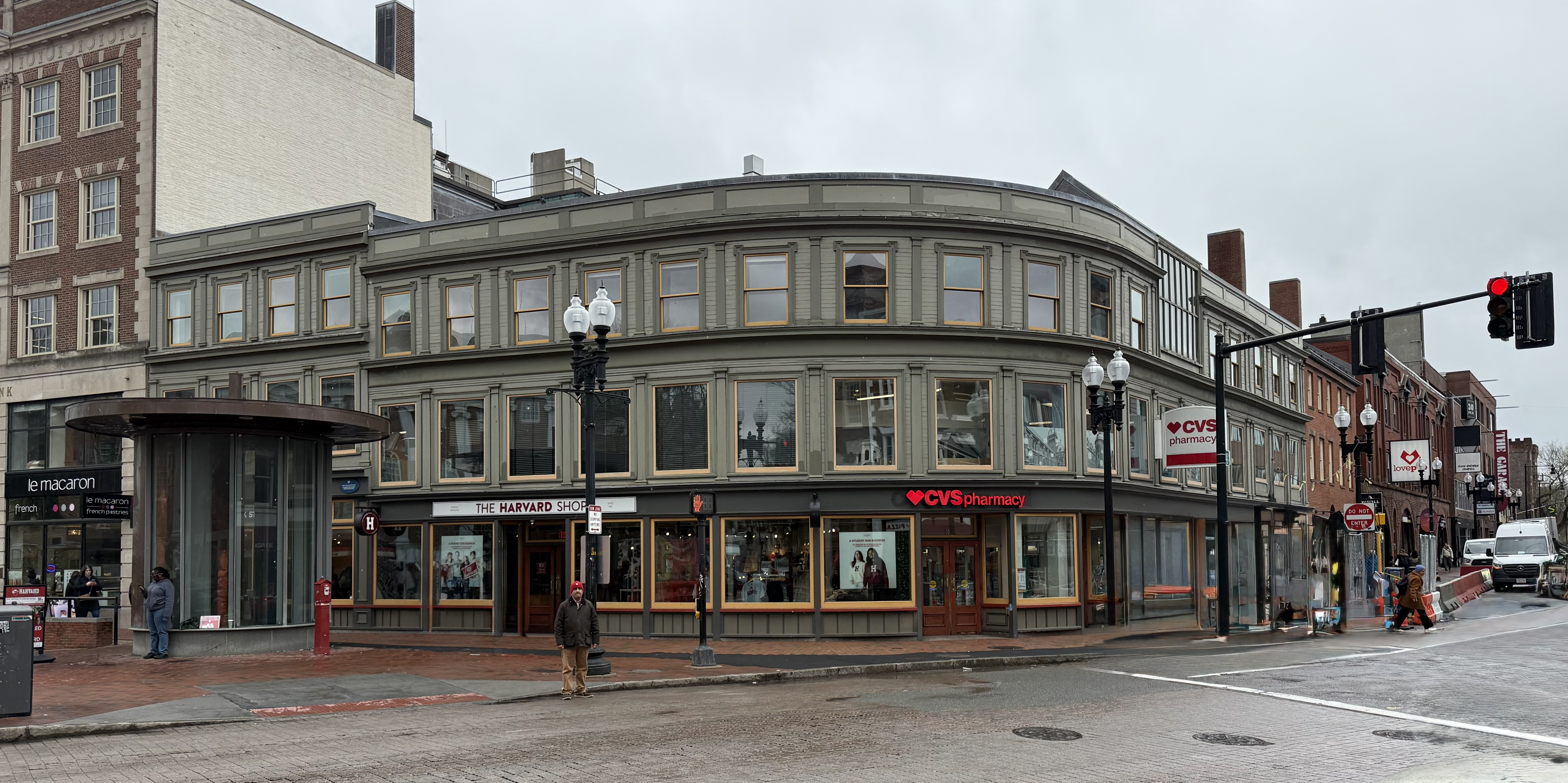
Former location of The Tasty in 2025

Despite a struggle by its owner Peter Haddad, the Tasty's tenancy ended in November 1997. A sign in its window during the move-out stated its lifespan: "81 years. 29,565 days. 5,913,000 people. 422,357 per stool." Its landlord, the Cambridge Savings Bank, took advantage of the increasing attractiveness of the Harvard Square neighborhood to chain store franchises, which enabled the bank to charge significantly higher rents to tenants who provided greater security. Opposition to the end of the Tasty's tenancy was voiced by a number of groups, including the Harvard Square Defense Fund and brothers Tom and Ray Magliozzi, 'Click and Clack, the Tappet Brothers' on their radio talk show, Car Talk. The Tasty became a cause célèbre and a symbol of the transitions the neighborhood was undergoing.

Despite having brought considerable evidence attesting to the historical value of the diner and the important social role it played in Harvard Square, the supporters of the Tasty did not prevail; however, the Cambridge City Council required that the distinctive entrance to the Tasty be preserved, giving it landmark status, and it remains unmodified today. The attention paid to the closing of the Tasty by the Cambridge City Council in the Winter of 1997 occasioned a rebuke from the Harvard Square Business Association, who criticized the council for becoming involved in a private, contractual matter.

For a time, an Abercrombie & Fitch store operated in the building on the site formerly occupied by the Tasty. This store was later succeeded by a branch office of Citizens Bank, and the actual space in which the Tasty once operated became occupied by a row of Citizens Bank ATMs. As Muchnik remarks, "if you look at the bank in the Read Block today, you have one door too many" — the extraneous door, a second entrance to the small ATM lobby, being that of the former diner. Following a relocation of Citizens Bank to Brattle Square, a CVS Pharmacy since opened in its place.

The Tasty's closure is considered a side effect of gentrification; the small, confined space of the Tasty, its prices (far lower than any other restaurant in the Square at the time of its closing) and friendly neighborhood atmosphere attracted patrons from all socio-economic strata and contrasted, in many ways, with the more upscale stores and restaurants emerging — and transforming — the Harvard Square community.

The local hamburger chain Tasty Burger opened a location on John F. Kennedy Street, not far from the Tasty's former location. Its design is "meant to invoke" the Tasty, using similar lettering for its logo.
