= Harvard/MIT Cooperative Society =

U.S. campus bookstore chain

Coordinates: 42.3737°N 71.1196°W

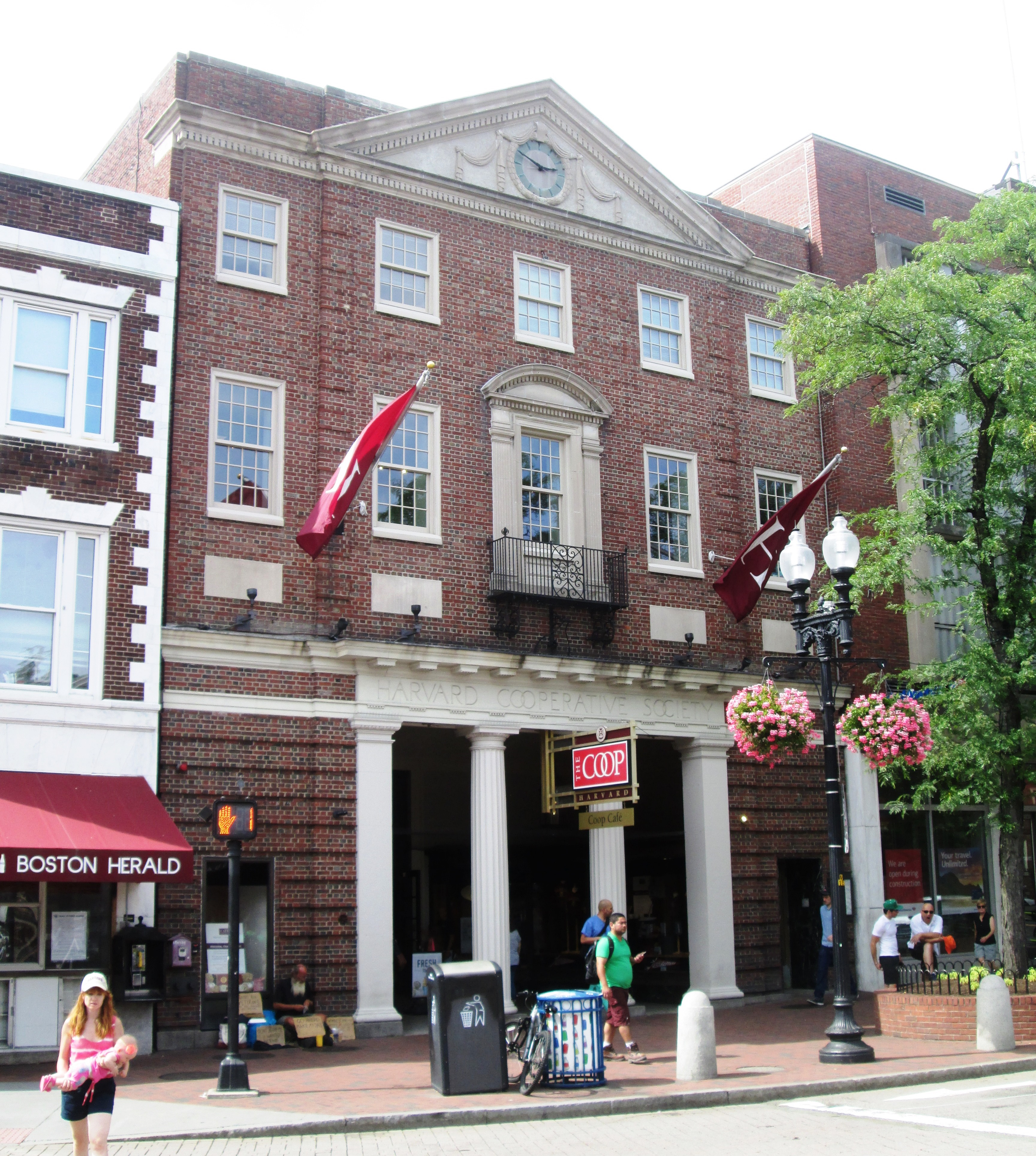
The Coop's main store in Harvard Square was built in 1924 and designed by Perry, Shaw & Hepburn in the Colonial Revival style.

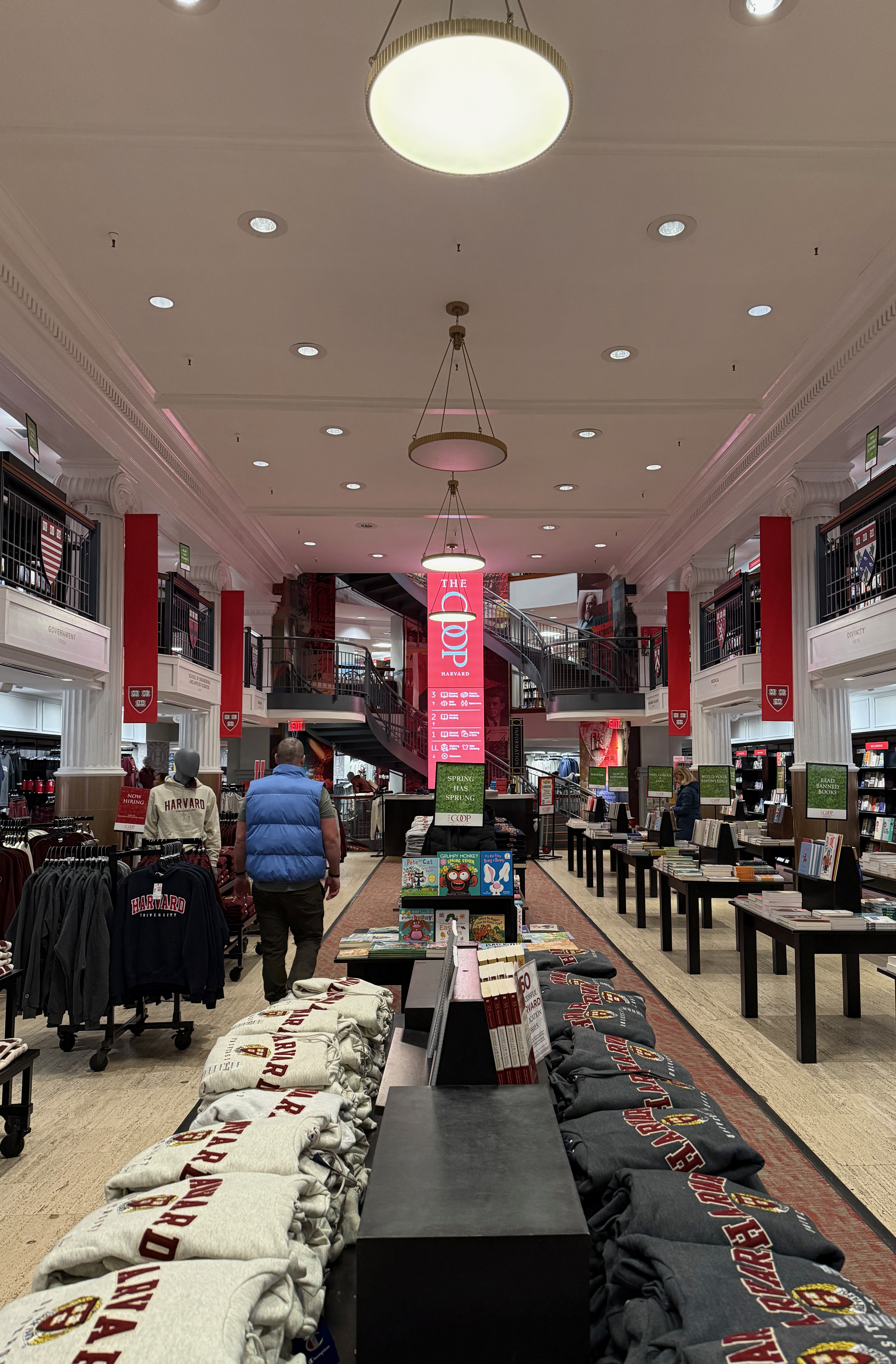
First floor of the interior (2025)

The Harvard/MIT Cooperative Society (or The Coop, pronounced as a single syllable) is a retail cooperative for the Harvard University and MIT campuses in Cambridge, Massachusetts. While the general public is able to shop, membership discounts and other benefits are restricted to Coop members. As of 2020, there are three store locations at Harvard, and two at MIT. The main store is located in the heart of Harvard Square, across the street from the headhouse of the Harvard subway station.

The Coop was founded as the Harvard Cooperative in 1882 to supply books, school supplies, and wood and coal for winter heating. MIT, following its move from Boston to Cambridge in 1916, invited the Coop to open a branch of the store at the Institute, where it has been present ever since. Today, the store is one of the largest college campus bookstores.

Only students, faculty, alumni and employees of MIT, Harvard, and the personnel of the hospitals affiliated with the Harvard Medical School are eligible to join. Membership cost $1 annually in 1882, and this fee has not been increased. Members may also purchase a Coop Diary, a black combination pocket diary, academic year calendar, and address book. The Coop traditionally had disbursed its annual profits as a rebate to members in October of each year. As of July 1, 2014, the rebate program has been replaced with an automatic additional discount of 10% at the registers, for Coop members in good standing.

The Coop stores are managed by Barnes & Noble College Booksellers, under supervision of a board of directors, including eleven students elected by the student membership. Faculty, alumni, or officers of MIT or Harvard fill another eleven seats, and the Coop's president serves ex officio.

In 2014, the MIT branch announced that it was the first campus bookstore in the U.S. to accept bitcoin payments.

The MIT branch had, for decades, operated a department store and general bookstore at 325 Main Street as Kendall Square's largest retailer. In February 2019, this store moved to smaller temporary home at 80 Broadway, to allow for demolition of the building housing its former location. A new, taller sixteen-story building has been constructed on the site, and the Coop is expected to move into a space larger than its temporary quarters, but possibly smaller than its previous space at that location.
