= Tasty Burger =

Boston hamburger chain

Tasty Burger is an American regional fast food restaurant chain based in Boston. It was founded in 2010 by David DuBois and Phil Audino of The Franklin Restaurant Group. At its peak, Tasty Burger had six locations, including one in Washington, D.C. As of 2023, there are four locations across Boston and Cambridge.

== History ==
The first Tasty Burger location opened in 2010 in Fenway, replacing a former gas station and automotive service. Its name is a reference to the Tasty Sandwich Shop in Harvard Square, which closed in 1997. Its second location opened in South Boston in 2012, quickly followed by a third location in Harvard Square. By 2016, there were six Tasty Burger locations across the East Coast.

The South Boston location closed permanently after a May 2018 fire led to $150,000 in damages.

=== Washington DC expansion ===
In August 2015, Tasty Burger announced plans to open its fifth location in Shaw, a neighborhood of Washington, D.C. In June 2016, prior to the opening of the Shaw location, Tasty Burger filed with the FTC to raise $15 million in equity for "future expansion". The Shaw location closed in October 2018.

=== COVID-19 response ===
In response to the emerging COVID-19 pandemic, Tasty Burger announced that all locations would be temporarily closed starting on March 16, 2020. By May 22, its Fenway and Harvard Square locations reopened for takeout, and its North Station and Back Bay locations reopened for delivery. By July 17, its Downtown Crossing location had also reopened.

== Chipotle trademark dispute ==
In July 2016, Chipotle Mexican Grill announced the opening of its new hamburger restaurant, Tasty Made, in Lancaster, Ohio. Chipotle had filed for trademarks for the name "Better Burger" in March 2016, but abandoned these trademarks in May. Tasty Burger issued a cease-and-desist letter to Chipotle on July 19, alleging copyright infringement based on similarities in the names and logo designs of the two restaurants, but received no response. Tasty Burger CEO David DuBois argued that Chipotle was willfully ignoring their cease-and-desist, noting that the two restaurants share a landlord at their Fenway locations. Chipotle Communications Director Chris Arnold claimed that the United States Patent and Trademark Office had refused to register a trademark for Tasty Burger upon its founding because the name is merely descriptive. In reality, Tasty Burger's trademark was on the Supplemental Register; it applied for a trademark on the Principal Register in August 2016, soon after the legal dispute began. All formal trademark disputes were terminated in December 2017.

Despite this conflict, the sole Tasty Made location opened in Lancaster in October 2016. It closed on February 28, 2018 for reasons unrelated to the trademark disputes.

== Boston Red Sox partnership ==
Tasty Burger was the official burger of the Boston Red Sox from 2014 to 2020. As part of the partnership, Tasty Burger was able to sell concessions from within Fenway Park. The affiliation was restored in 2026.
