= Leavitt & Peirce =

Leavitt & Peirce is a Harvard Square tobacconist open since 1883. The Harvard Crimson (in 1956) said it is the “last remnant of the "old Harvard."” Forbes listed the store at number eight in the list of 2019 top ten independent retail experiences.

Various issues, such as Cambridge requiring customers to be 21, a 40% excise tax and smoking being illegal in many indoor settings have forced them to rethink their business model. They now sell non tobacco related merchandise such as “top-shelf toiletry items and classic board games.”
