= Charlie's Kitchen =

Restaurant in Cambridge, Massachusetts

Coordinates: 42.37245°N 71.12150°W

- Industry: Restaurants
- Genre: Casual dining
- Founded: 1951
- Defunct: January 28, 2026
- Headquarters: Cambridge, Massachusetts, U.S.
- Products: American cuisine
- Parent: Tomolly Inc.
- Website: CharliesKitchen.com

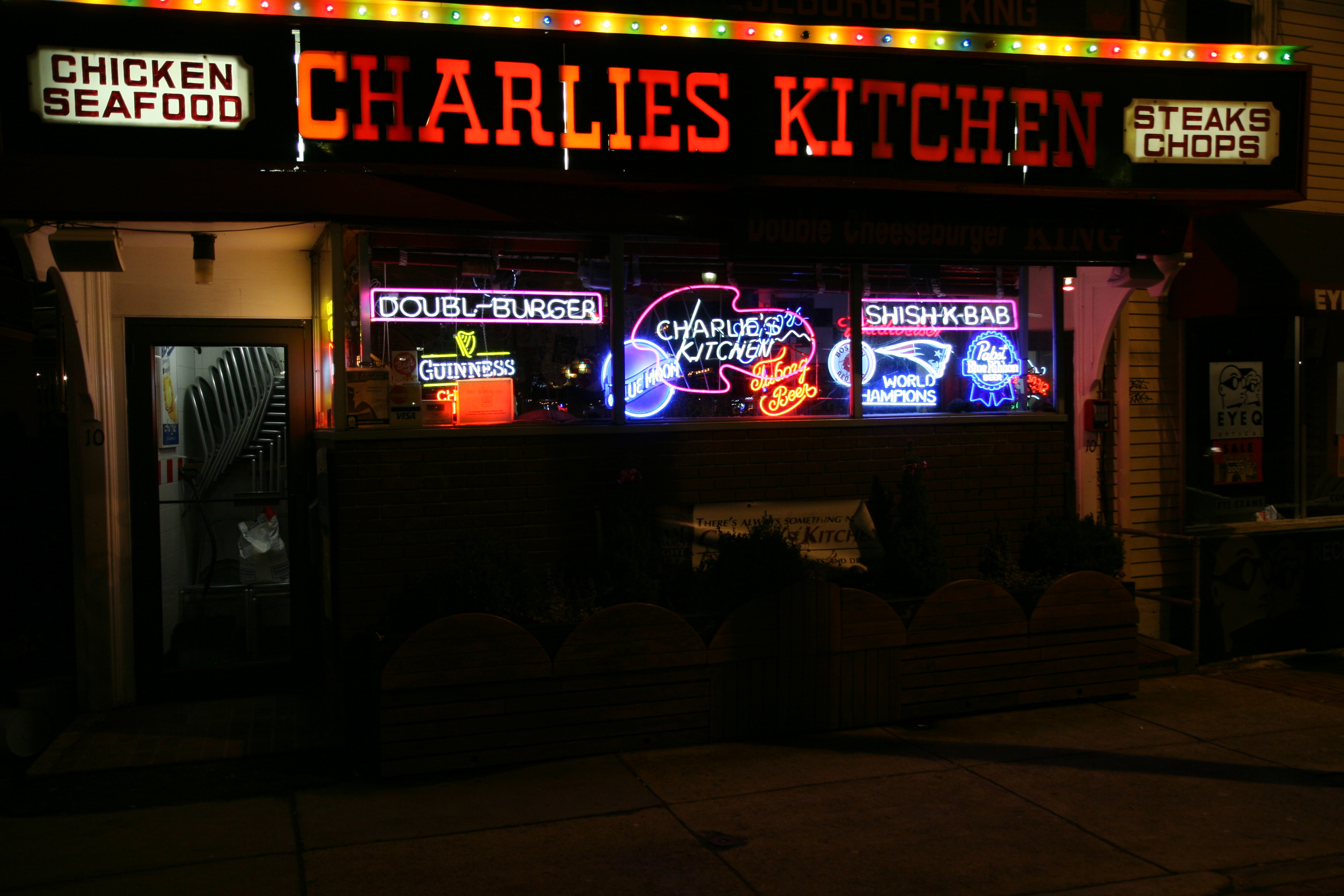
Charlie's Kitchen at night

Charlie's Kitchen ("The Double Cheeseburger King") was a restaurant serving American fare with New England specialties in the Harvard Square neighborhood of Cambridge, Massachusetts. “Charlie’s” housed bars on two separate floors; additionally, a front patio and backyard beer garden were open seasonally. The Boston Phoenix named it one of the best dive bars in Boston in 2009. As of late 2026, Charlies was closed and sold off their inventory.

== History ==
Opened by Charlie Lambrose in 1951, Charlie's Kitchen was considered to be one of the last vestiges of "old" Harvard Square. It was located at 10 Eliot Street in Cambridge, Massachusetts. Waitress Helen Metros famously waited tables at Charlie's for over 50 years.

== Green Initiatives ==
Despite the grungy exterior, Charlie's Kitchen's management undertook several eco-friendly initiatives. Solar panels on the roof heated water for kitchen-use and the restaurant composted all of its food waste and recycled. Some plastics, including the beer garden cups, were also compostable. Three vehicles ran on the restaurant's waste fry oil.

== Awards ==
Charlie's Kitchen's jukebox won the Boston Phoenix’s reader-polled "Best of Boston Award for Best Jukebox" several times, most recently in 2010. It also won The Improper Bostonian's Boston's Best Bar for the Harvard Square Neighborhood in 2010 and the Weekly Dig's Dig This Award for Best Outdoor dining in 2009.
