= Harvard Square =

Plaza in Cambridge, Massachusetts, US

- Harvard Square Historic District
- U.S. National Register of Historic Places
- U.S. Historic district
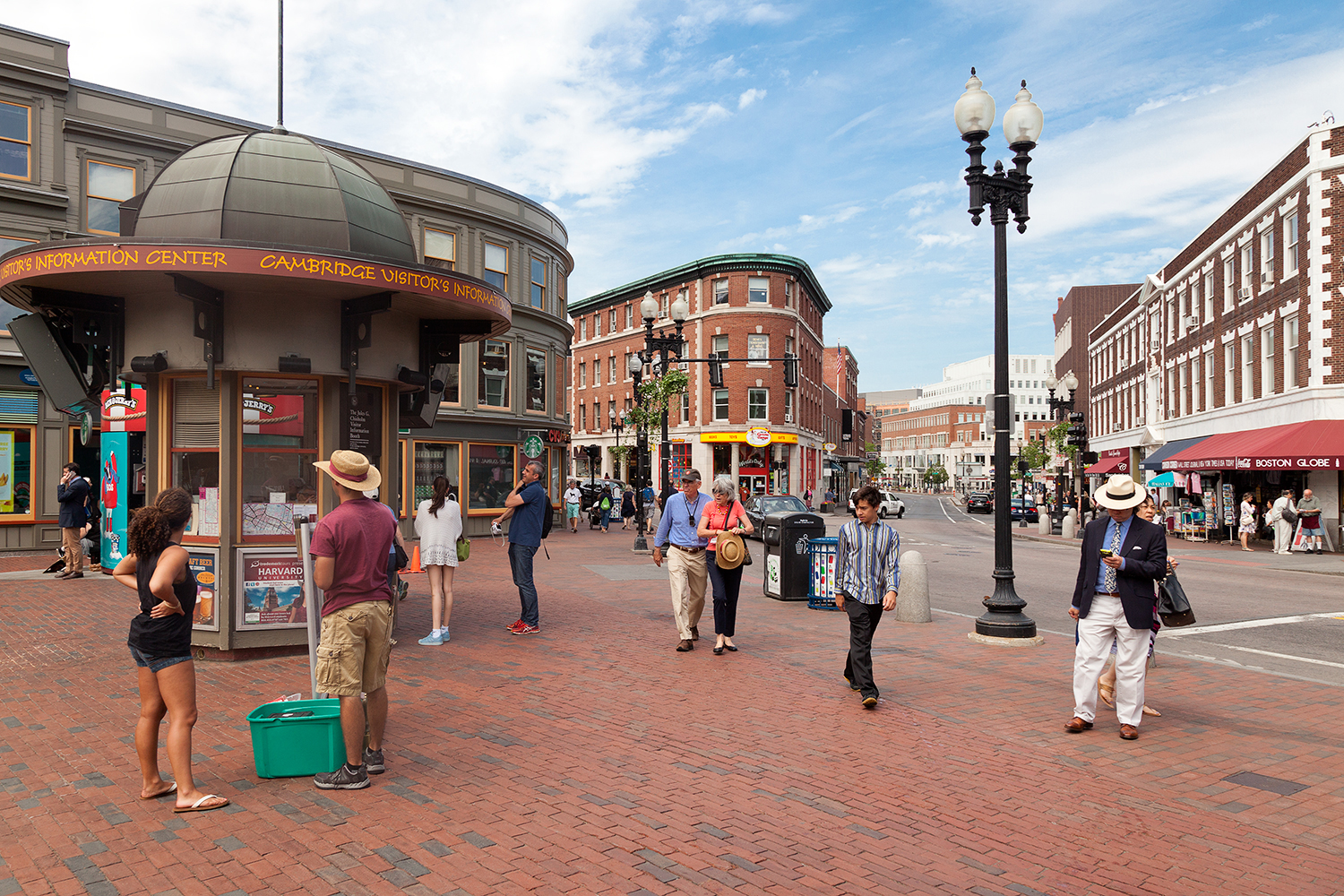
- Harvard Square in 2015, looking west toward John F. Kennedy Street (left) and Brattle Street

- Location within Massachusetts Location within the United States
- Location: Cambridge, Massachusetts, U.S.
- Coordinates: 42°22′25″N 71°7′8″W
- Architectural style: Colonial Revival and Greek Revival
- MPS: Cambridge MRA
- NRHP reference No.: 82001944 (original); 86003654 (increase)

Significant dates
- Added to NRHP: April 13, 1982
- Boundary increase: July 28, 1988

Harvard Square is a triangular plaza at the intersection of Massachusetts Avenue, Brattle Street, and John F. Kennedy Street near the center of Cambridge, Massachusetts, United States. The term "Harvard Square" is also used to delineate the business district and Harvard University surrounding that intersection, which is the historic center of Cambridge. Adjacent to Harvard Yard, the historic heart of Harvard University, the Square (as it is sometimes called, locally) functions as a commercial center for Harvard students, as well as residents of western Cambridge, the western and northern neighborhoods and the inner suburbs of Boston. The Square is served by Harvard station, a major MBTA Red Line subway station and a bus transportation hub.

The name "Harvard Square" can also refer to the entire neighborhood surrounding this intersection for several blocks in each direction, including Brattle Square, a block away, and the nearby Cambridge Common. The Common is a park area with a playground, baseball field, and a number of monuments, several relating to the Revolutionary War.

== Location ==
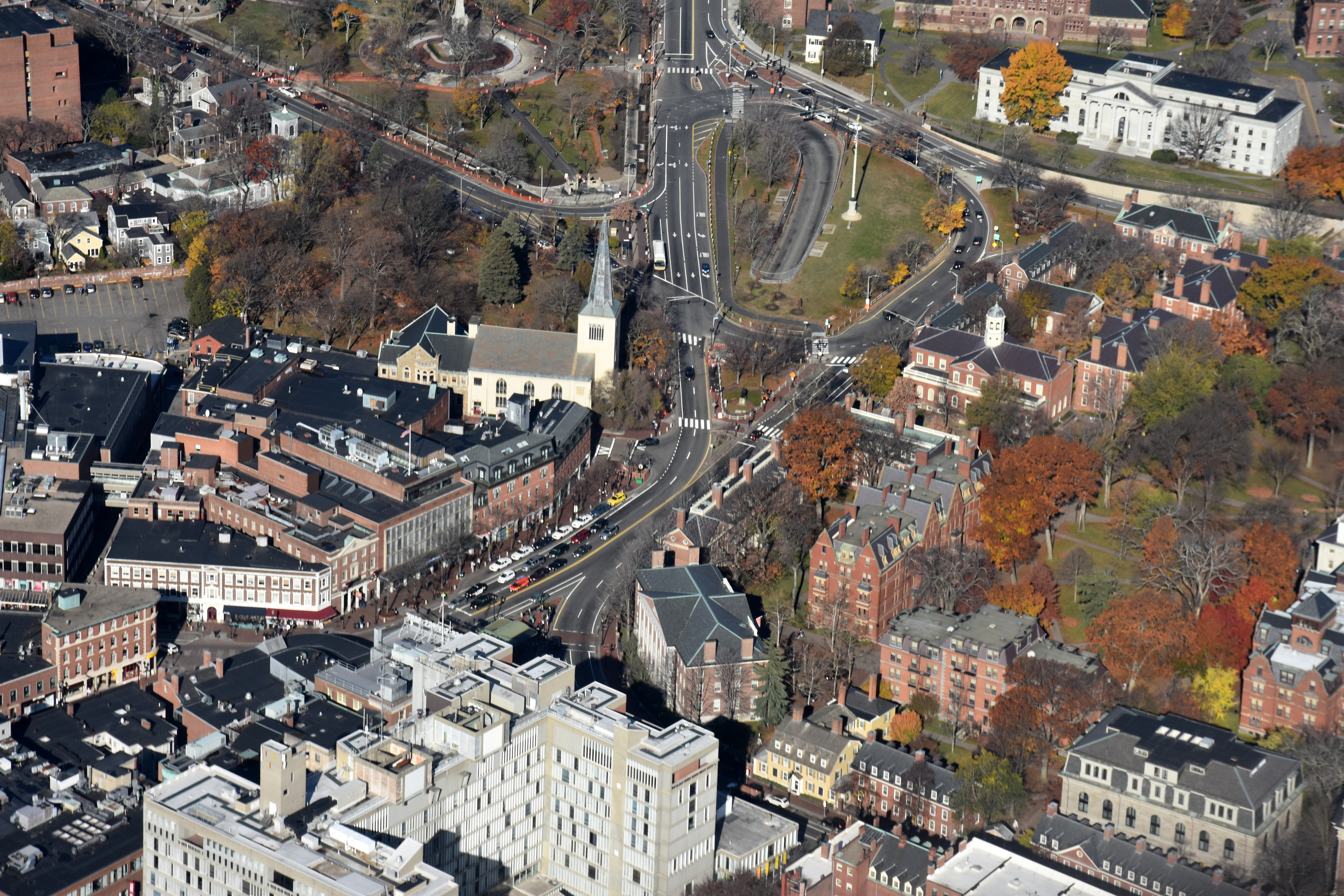
Aerial view of the Mass Ave/Brattle Street junction, with Harvard Yard at the right, looking north

The center of Harvard Square is the junction of Massachusetts Avenue and Brattle Street. Massachusetts Avenue enters from the southeast, a few miles after crossing the Charles River from Boston near the MIT campus, and turns sharply north at the intersection. Brattle Street and John F. Kennedy Street merge from the southwest and join Massachusetts Avenue at that point. The area is dominated by a large pedestrian space that includes the MBTA subway headhouse (entrance) and the historic Harvard Square Subway Kiosk, which formerly housed the Out of Town News newsstand.

The main building of the Harvard/MIT Cooperative Society forms part of the western side of the intersection, along with a bank and several retail shops; on the eastern side is the walled enclosure of Harvard Yard.

=== Nearby places ===
The core of the campus of Harvard University lies in the vicinity of Harvard Square, including Harvard Yard as well as the Harvard Extension School, the Harvard Art Museums, the Semitic Museum, the Peabody Museum of Archaeology and Ethnology, and the Harvard Museum of Natural History.

Other institutions in the surrounding area include the Cambridge Public Library, Lesley University, the Longy School of Music, the Episcopal Divinity School, the Cambridge Rindge and Latin School, the American Repertory Theater, the Cooper-Frost-Austin House, the Hooper-Lee-Nichols House, and the Longfellow House–Washington's Headquarters National Historic Site.

Due to its high pedestrian traffic, Harvard Square and nearby Brattle Square (the intersection of Brattle St. and Mt. Auburn St.) serve as gathering places for street musicians and buskers. Singer-songwriter Tracy Chapman, who attended nearby Tufts University, performed there during her college years. Amanda Palmer, a member of the Dresden Dolls, also performed in the square as a "living statue". Other performers who have appeared there include indie rock guitarist Mary Lou Lord and the juggling troupe The Flying Karamazov Brothers.

A small bronze statue of "Doo Doo," a puppet created by Igor Fokin, stands at the corner of Brattle Street and Eliot Street. The memorial honors Fokin and other street performers who have performed in the square. The statue was created by Konstantin Simun in 2001.

=== Other features ===
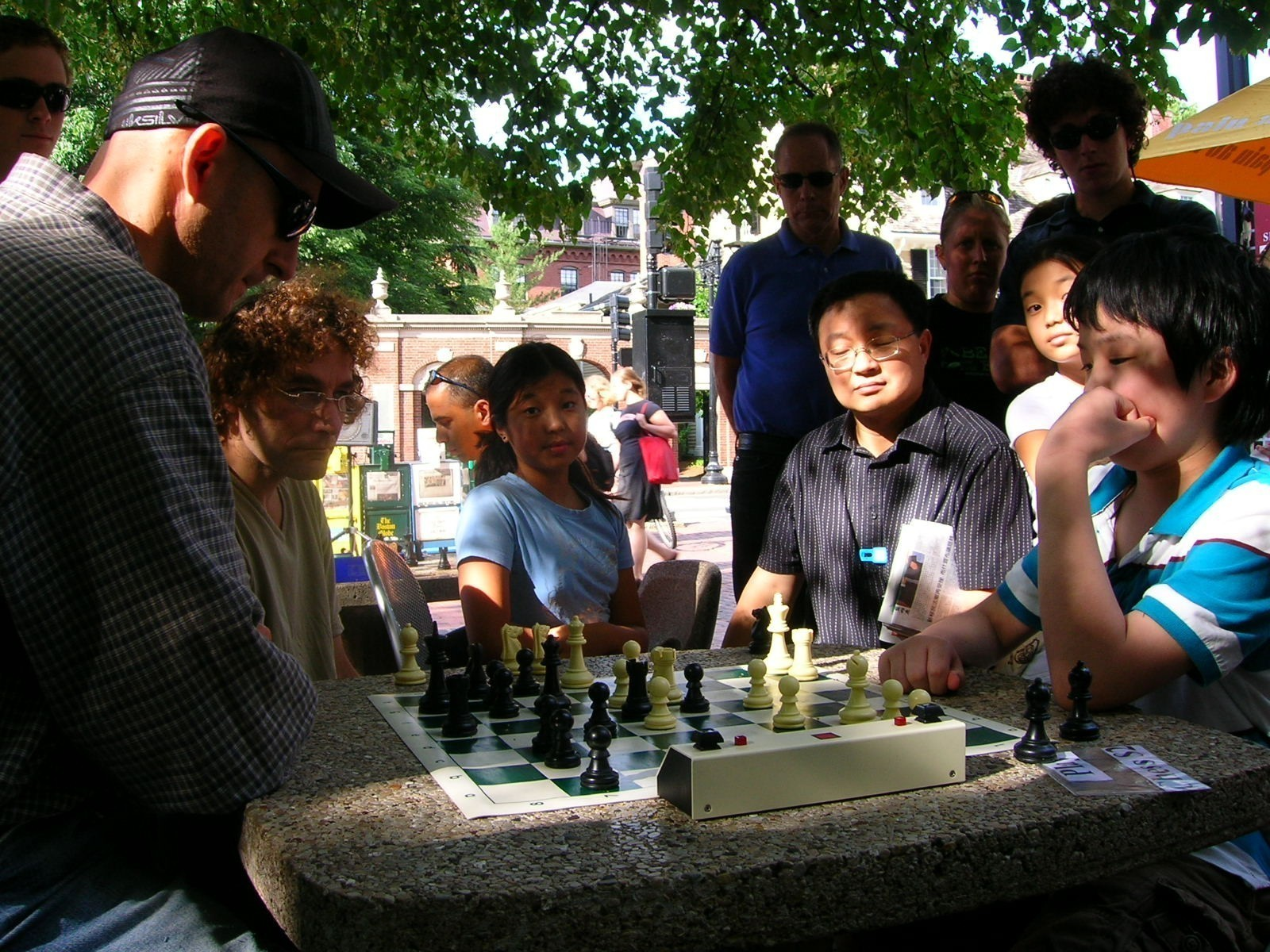
Chess players in Harvard Square

Until 1984, when the Red Line was extended to Alewife, the Harvard Square station served as the subway line's northern terminus. The station remains a major transfer point between the subway and bus routes. Many bus routes serving areas north and west of Cambridge pass through a tunnel adjacent to the subway tunnel. The trackless trolleys that used to use the tunnel were discontinued in March 2022.

The tunnel was originally constructed for streetcars, which last operated there in 1958, and is now used by buses. It helps reduce surface traffic in Harvard Square and allows buses to cross the area without encountering automobile traffic. The tunnel also provides covered access between subway and bus services.

At the center of the square is the historic Harvard Square Subway Kiosk, which housed the Out of Town News newsstand until its closure in 2020. The kiosk now hosts a public motion-art installation, Lumen Eclipse, which features rotating exhibitions by local, national, and international artists.

Several smaller public squares are located along nearby streets, including Brattle Square and Winthrop Square, (Note: Brattle Square, Harvard Square, and Winthrop Square occupy the three corners of the triangular block formed by Brattle Street, John F. Kennedy Street, and Mount Auburn Street.) and frequently host street performers throughout the year. Brattle Street is also home to the Brattle Theatre and the American Repertory Theater. John F. Kennedy Memorial Park lies one block down John F. Kennedy Street along the Charles River, while Cambridge Common is located two blocks to the north.

== History ==
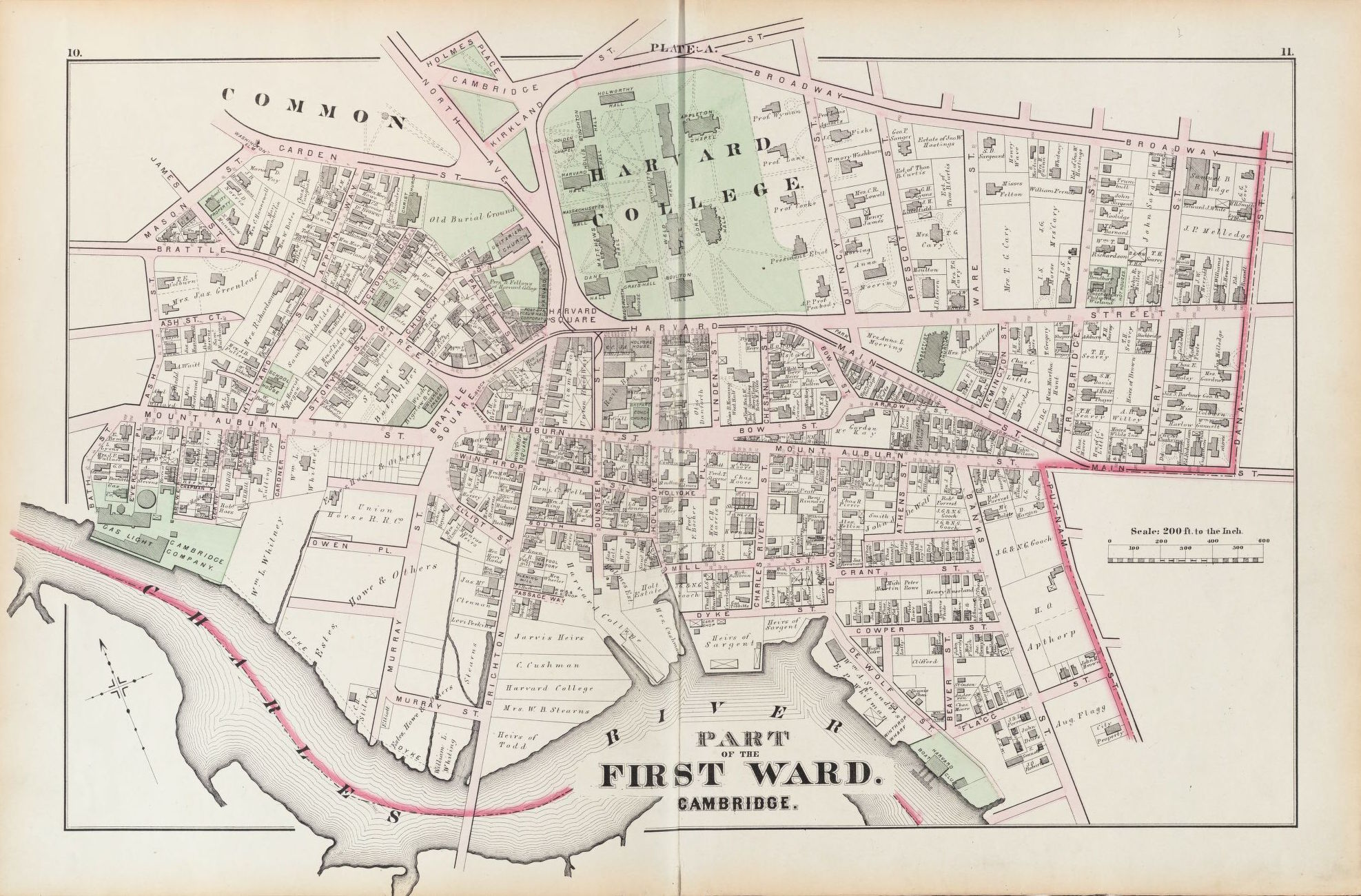
1873 Map of Harvard Square

Although today a commercial center, the Square had notable residents in earlier periods, including the colonial poet Anne Bradstreet.

A 1995 proposal to redevelop the Read Block sparked concern over the possible removal of historic buildings and local businesses, such as the Tasty lunch counter. In response, the Cambridge City Council called for a plan to preserve Harvard Square’s historic character. Following several years of review, the council voted unanimously on December 18, 2000, to create the Harvard Square Conservation District. This designation authorized the Cambridge Historical Commission to review proposed demolitions, new construction, and exterior changes visible from public areas within the district.

=== Transformation ===
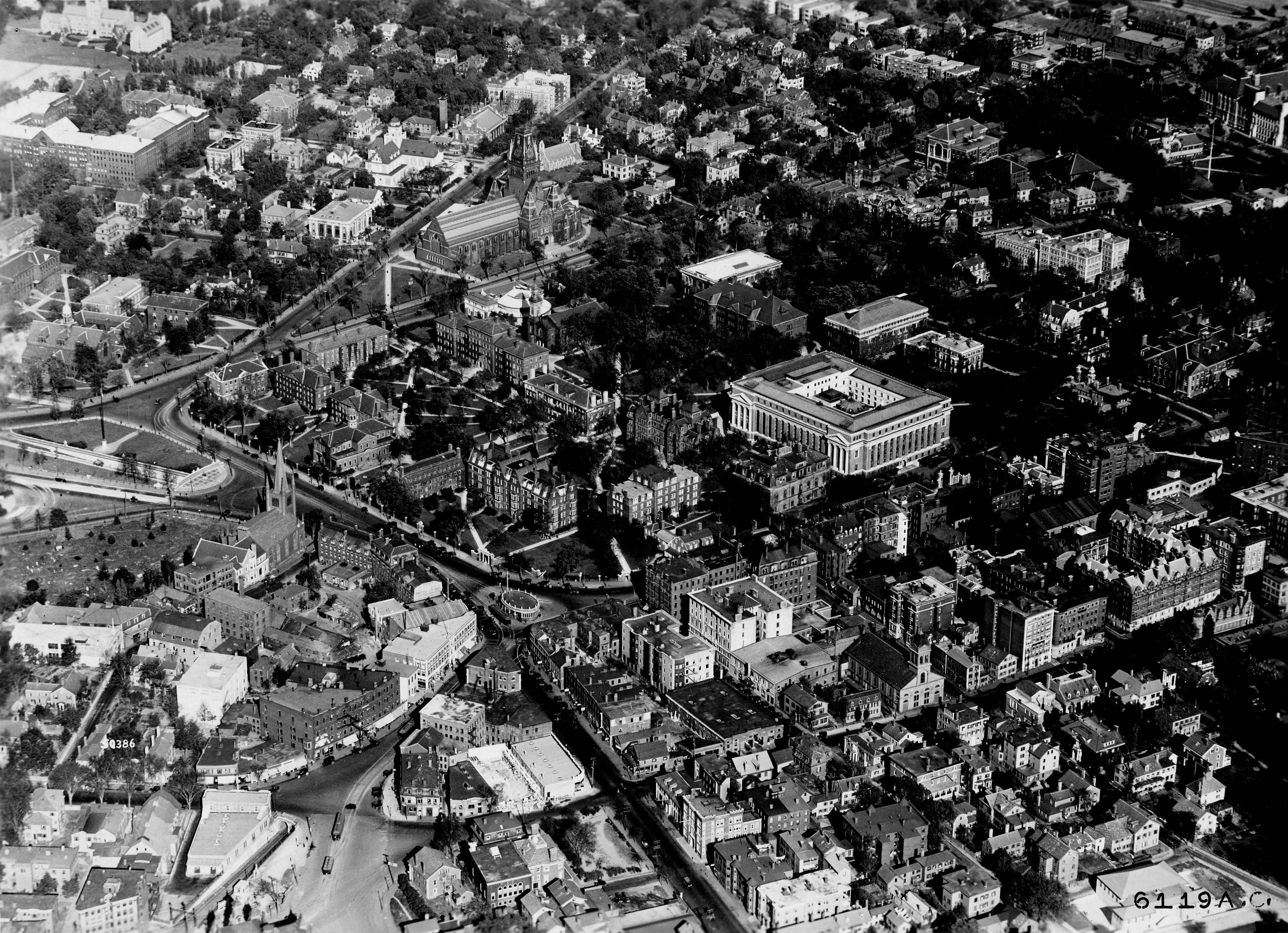
Harvard Square from above in 1921, looking west. Harvard University's Widener Library is right of center

Discussions of how the Square has changed in recent years usually center on the gentrification of the Harvard Square neighborhood and Cambridge in general. The Square also used to be a neighborhood shopping center, including a grocery store (Sages) and a Woolworth's five and ten. Although a hardware store (Dickson Hardware at 26 Brattle Street) survived until 2021 amid chain drug stores and bank branches, the Square is mainly a regional rather than neighborhood shopping destination, serving students and commuters.

In 1981 and 1987 the Harvard Square Theater was converted into a multiplex cinema; it later became part of the Loews Cineplex Entertainment chain and then closed on July 8, 2012. During the late 1990s, some locally run businesses with long-time shopfronts on the Square—including the unusual Tasty Diner, a tiny sandwich shop open long hours, and the Wursthaus, a German restaurant with an extensive beer menu—closed to make way for national chains. Elsie's Lunch, a long-popular deli, also closed; what remained of its small corner storefront space facing Lowell House on Mount Auburn Street is now occupied by an ATM. Another long-time restaurant, Leo's Place, closed in December 2013, after 64 years in business, when the landlord of the property terminated their lease.

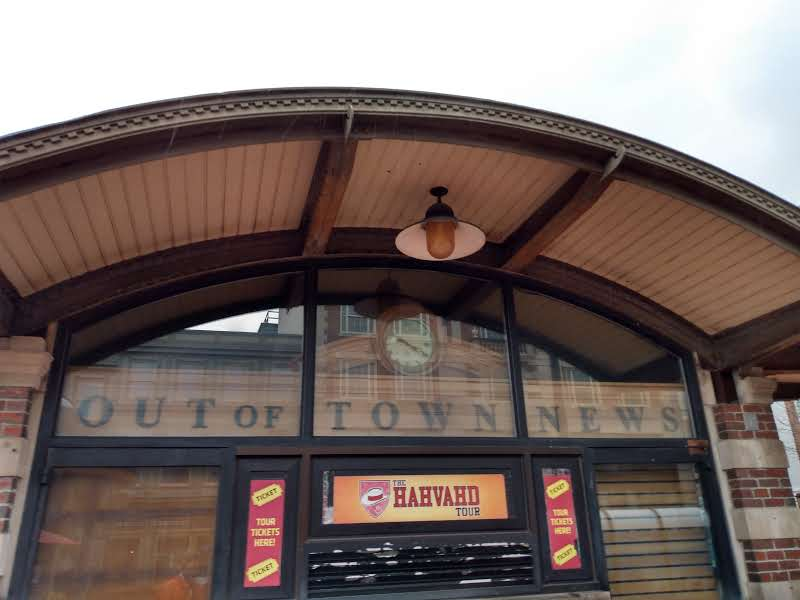
The Out of Town News newsstand, which opened in 1955, occupied the Harvard Square subway kiosk from 1984 to 2019.

The student co-op, the Harvard/MIT Cooperative Society ("The Coop"), founded in 1882, is now managed by Barnes & Noble, though it is still overseen by a board elected by its membership of Harvard and MIT students and staff. Schoenhof's Foreign Books is owned by the French Éditions Gallimard. Major bookstores Paperback Booksmith, Reading International, and Barilari Books had closed by the end of the 1990s. WordsWorth Books at 30 Brattle Street closed in 2004, after 29 years as a fixture in the Square. In the same year, the famous Grolier Poetry Bookshop announced that it would be sold (although it survived under new management). Globe Corner Bookstore converted to an exclusively online business, serving its last walk-in customer on July 4, 2011.

Following national trends, the former Harvard Trust Company has been absorbed into the national Bank of America through a series of mergers. Several establishments remain as longstanding, locally-run businesses with unique styles. Examples include Leavitt & Peirce tobacconists (est. 1883), Laflamme Barber Shop (est. 1898), Harvard Book Store (est. 1932), Cardullo's Gourmet Shoppe (est. 1950), Charlie's Kitchen (est. 1951), the Brattle Theater (est. 1953), the Hong Kong Chinese restaurant (est. 1954), Club Passim (est. 1958), Café Pamplona (est. 1959), Mr. Bartley's Burger Cottage (est. 1960), Million Year Picnic comics (est. 1970), Algiers Coffee House (est. 1970), and Grendel's Den (est. 1971).

A small sunken seating area next to the subway headhouse, known as "the Pit", became a performance space for street performers and a gathering place for punks and other alternative subcultures in the 1980s and 1990s; the area was demolished in 2025 in order to improve Harvard Square's accessibility.

== In film and other media ==
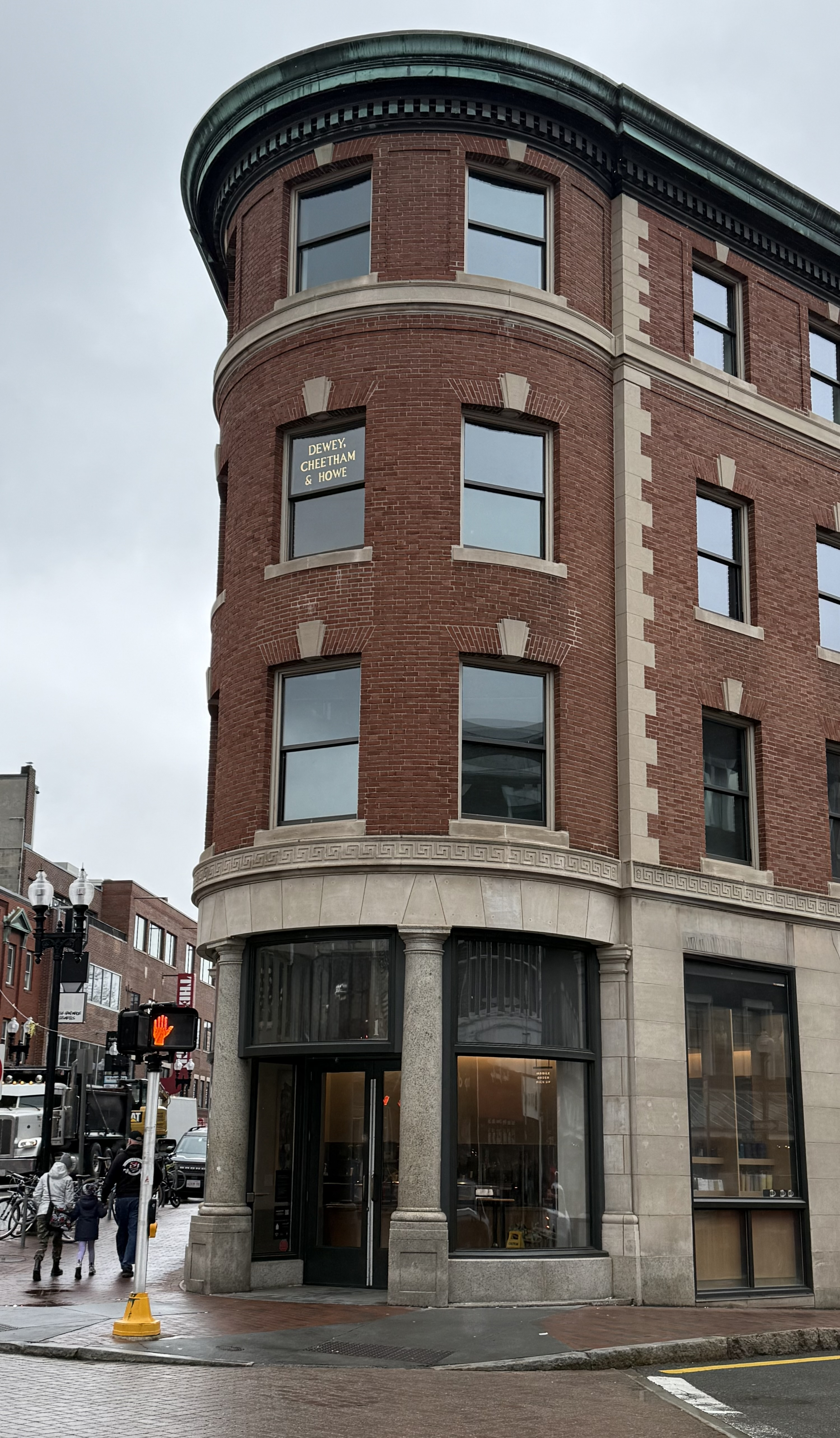
The Peabody Award-winning radio show Car Talk's offices occupied the Abbott Building from 1992 until 2014. The office window's signage, which reads "Dewey, Cheetham & Howe", has become a local landmark.

The 1969 film Goodbye, Columbus takes place in Harvard Square near the film's conclusion, after the Richard Benjamin character learns that his girlfriend, Brenda Potimkin (played by Ali MacGraw), an undergraduate at Radcliffe College, had left her diaphragm in the top drawer of her bureau at home for her mother to discover.

The 1970 film Love Story, by the late Harvard University alumnus and Yale University professor of classics Erich Segal, takes place almost entirely in and around Harvard Square during its first two-thirds, while Harvard undergraduates Oliver Barrett and Jenny Cavalieri meet; finish college; get married; and Oliver goes to Harvard Law School while Jenny teaches school, living in a second-story walk-up in Baldwin. The film continues to be screened annually to incoming freshmen at Harvard College during orientation week.

The 1997 film Good Will Hunting Will Hunting (played by Matt Damon) goes on a date with his girlfriend (played by Minnie Driver) at the now-defunct Tasty Sandwich Shop.

The 2005 documentary film Touching History; Harvard Square, the Bank, and The Tasty Diner chronicles the changing face of the Square, as a small diner (The Tasty) closes its doors to make way for a large retail space.

Ben Affleck shot portions of his film The Town (2010) in Grendel's Den on Winthrop Street, locally famous in the 1970s for its chocolate fondue.

The 2015 game Fallout 4 features Harvard Square as an in-game location. Though the layout of the surrounding area is not accurate, the subway kiosk is present.

=== "Car Talk Plaza" ===
The radio show Car Talk's offices occupied the third floor of the Abbott Building from 1992 until the show's end in 2014. At the beginning of every episode, hosts Tom and Ray Magliozzi would state they were broadcasting from "Car Talk Plaza" in Harvard (though the show itself was recorded at the WBUR Studio in Boston). Local tourism and business leaders likewise refer to the area colloquially as "Car Talk Plaza". The office's window, which faces the square, reads "Dewey Cheetham & Howe", a reference to The Three Stooges. Though the former office is now a yoga studio, the window signage has remained. In the early 2020s, while redeveloping the Abbott Building, the executive director of the Cambridge Historical Commission ensured the sign's preservation, calling it "a character-defining feature of [the Abbott] building". In 2019, a commemorative plaque for Tom Magliozzi, who died in 2014, was installed outside the Abbott Building beside the Harvard Red Line terminal. Harvard Square, called "Car Talk Plaza", is also the setting of Click and Clack's As the Wrench Turns, an animated television spin-off of Car Talk.

== See also ==
- Design Research
- National Register of Historic Places listings in Cambridge, Massachusetts
- Orson Welles Cinema
- William Brattle House
- Conductor's Building
- St. Paul Church (Cambridge, Massachusetts)
